= Richmond (Quebec provincial electoral district) =

Provincial electoral district in Quebec, Canada

Coordinates: 45.661°N 71.971°W

Quebec electoral district

Provincial electoral district
- Legislature: National Assembly of Quebec
MNA
Bernard Sévigny
Parti Québécois
- District created: 1890
- First contested: 1890
- Last contested: 2026

Demographics
- Population (2011): 74,765
- Electors (2012): 57,285
- Area (km²): 1,976.7
- Pop. density (per km²): 37.8
- Census division(s): Sherbrooke (part), Le Val-Saint-François (part)
- Census subdivision(s): Sherbrooke (part), Cleveland, Kingsbury, Melbourne, Richmond, Saint-Claude, Saint-Denis-de-Brompton, Saint-François-Xavier-de-Brompton, Stoke, Ulverton, Val-Joli, Windsor

Richmond is a provincial electoral district in the Estrie region of Quebec, Canada, which elects members to the National Assembly of Quebec. It notably includes parts of the city of Sherbrooke as well as the municipalities of Val-des-Sources, Windsor, Saint-Denis-de-Brompton, Danville, and Richmond.

It was created for the 1890 election from a part of the Richmond-Wolfe electoral district.

In the change from the 2001 to the 2011 electoral map, its territory was altered substantially. It lost most of its northern half, primarily to the new Drummond–Bois-Francs electoral district, and expanded southward to include a part of the city of Sherbrooke.

In 2026, it lost Danville, Val-des-Sources, Saint-Georges-de-Windsor, Wotton, Saint-Adrien, Saint-Camille, Ham-Sud, Maricourt, Valcourt (city), Valcourt (township) and Racine, while gaining Stoke and Brompton.

== Members of the Legislative Assembly / National Assembly ==
Legislature	Years	Member	Party
Riding created from Richmond-Wolfe
7th	1890–1892	Joseph Bédard	Conservative
8th	1892–1897	Joseph Bédard	Conservative
9th	1897–1900	Joseph Bédard	Conservative
10th	1900–1904	Peter Samuel George Mackenzie	Liberal
11th	1904–1908	Peter Samuel George Mackenzie	Liberal
12th	1908–1912	Peter Samuel George Mackenzie	Liberal
13th	1912–1914†	Peter Samuel George Mackenzie	Liberal
13th	1914–1916	Walter George Mitchell	Liberal
14th	1916–1919	Walter George Mitchell	Liberal
15th	1919–1921	Walter George Mitchell	Liberal
15th	1921–1923	Jacob Nicol	Liberal
16th	1923–1923	Georges-Ervé Denault	Liberal
16th	1923–1927	Stanislas-Edmond Desmarais	Liberal
17th	1927–1931	Stanislas-Edmond Desmarais	Liberal
18th	1931–1935	Stanislas-Edmond Desmarais	Liberal
19th	1935–1936	Albert Goudreau	Conservative
20th	1936–1939	Albert Goudreau	Union Nationale
21st	1939–1944	Stanislas-Edmond Desmarais	Liberal
22nd	1944–1948	Albert Goudreau	Union Nationale
23rd	1948–1952	Albert Goudreau	Union Nationale
24th	1952–1956	Émilien Lafrance	Liberal
25th	1956–1960	Émilien Lafrance	Liberal
26th	1960–1962	Émilien Lafrance	Liberal
27th	1962–1966	Émilien Lafrance	Liberal
28th	1966–1970	Émilien Lafrance	Liberal
29th	1970–1973	Yvon Brochu	Ralliement créditiste
30th	1973–1976	Yvon Vallières	Liberal
31st	1976–1981	Yvon Brochu	Union Nationale
32nd	1981–1985	Yvon Vallières	Liberal
33rd	1985–1989	Yvon Vallières	Liberal
34th	1989–1994	Yvon Vallières	Liberal
35th	1994–1998	Yvon Vallières	Liberal
36th	1998–2003	Yvon Vallières	Liberal
37th	2003–2007	Yvon Vallières	Liberal
38th	2007–2008	Yvon Vallières	Liberal
39th	2008–2012	Yvon Vallières	Liberal
40th	2012–2014	Karine Vallières	Liberal
41st	2014–2018	Karine Vallières	Liberal
42nd	2018–2022	André Bachand	Coalition Avenir Québec
43rd	2022–2026	André Bachand	Coalition Avenir Québec
44th	2026–Present	Bernard Sévigny	Parti Québécois

== Election results ==
2026 Quebec general election
** Preliminary results — Not yet official **
Party	Candidate	Votes	%	±%
Parti Québécois	Bernard Sévigny	12,718	29.23	
Conservative	Dominic Bouffard	9,956	22.88	
Liberal	Hugo Fontaine	9,906	22.77	
Coalition Avenir Québec	Guillaume Rousseau	5,767	13.26	
Québec solidaire	David Poulin-Latulippe	4,597	10.57	
Climat Québec	Pierre-Olivier Lassonde	243	0.56	
Independent	Christophe Duret	197	0.45	
Présence	Alexane Roy	124	0.29	
Total valid votes				
Total rejected ballots				
Turnout			74.27	
Electors on the lists			–	–
Parti Québécois gain from Coalition Avenir Québec		Swing		+
Source: Élections Québec

2022 Quebec general election redistributed results
Party	Vote	%
Coalition Avenir Québec	17,758	46.42
Québec solidaire	8,289	21.67
Conservative	5,123	13.39
Parti Québécois	4,824	12.61
Liberal	2,083	5.45
Others	174	0.45

2022 Quebec general election
Party	Candidate	Votes	%	±%
Coalition Avenir Québec	André Bachand	21,255	46.75	+7.11
Québec solidaire	Philippe Pagé	9,031	19.86	+0.96
Conservative	Marylaine Bélair	6,683	14.70	+13.40
Parti Québécois	Jacinthe Caron	5,803	12.76	-5.08
Liberal	Mona Louis-Jean	2,476	5.45	-14.36
Démocratie directe	Richard Magnan	112	0.25	–
Independent	Raymond de Martin	105	0.23	–
Total valid votes		45,465	98.64	–
Total rejected ballots		625	1.36	–
Turnout		46,090	72.10	
Electors on the lists		63,923		

2018 Quebec general election
Party	Candidate	Votes	%	±%
Coalition Avenir Québec	André Bachand	17,011	39.64	+17.60
Liberal	Annie Godbout	8,502	19.81	-21.35
Québec solidaire	Colombe Landry	8,110	18.90	+12.11
Parti Québécois	Véronique Vigneault	7,654	17.84	-9.76
Green	Yves La Madeleine	680	1.58	+0.23
Conservative	Karl Brousseau	600	1.40	+0.90
Citoyens au pouvoir	Déitane Gendron	353	0.82	
Total valid votes		42,910	98.36	
Total rejected ballots		716	1.64	
Turnout		43,626	72.11	
Eligible voters		60,502		
Coalition Avenir Québec gain from Liberal		Swing		+19.475
Source(s) "Rapport des résultats officiels du scrutin". Élections Québec.

2014 Quebec general election
Party	Candidate	Votes	%	±%
Liberal	Karine Vallières	17,178	41.16	+5.66
Parti Québécois	Etienne-Alexis Boucher	11,521	27.60	-7.31
Coalition Avenir Québec	Alain Dion	9,197	22.04	+0.35
Québec solidaire	Colombe Landry	2,833	6.79	+2.66
Green	Aurélie Dion-Fontaine	563	1.35	-0.17
Option nationale	Vincent Proulx	236	0.57	-1.23
Conservative	Dave Côté	209	0.50	–
Total valid votes		41,737	98.60	–
Total rejected ballots		594	1.40	–
Turnout		42,331	72.61	-6.65
Electors on the lists		58,296	–	–

2012 Quebec general election
Party	Candidate	Votes	%	±%
Liberal	Karine Vallières	15,962	35.50	-7.63
Parti Québécois	Etienne-Alexis Boucher	15,693	34.91	-3.21
Coalition Avenir Québec	Marie-Soleil Perron	9,751	21.69	+8.08
Québec solidaire	Colombe Landry	1,858	4.13	+1.01
Option nationale	Jean-Sébastien Lamothe	810	1.80	–
Green	Nick Fonda	684	1.52	-0.51
Coalition pour la constituante	Danielle Voisard	201	0.45	–
Total valid votes		44,959	98.78	–
Total rejected ballots		553	1.22	–
Turnout		45,512	79.26	
Electors on the lists		57,423	–	–
Liberal hold		Swing		-2.21

^ Change is from redistributed results. CAQ change is from ADQ.

2008 Quebec general election
Party	Candidate	Votes	%	±%
Liberal	Yvon Vallières	11,658	51.50	+9.18
Parti Québécois	Martyne Prévost	6,535	28.87	+8.25
Action démocratique	Jean-Philippe Hamel	3,682	16.27	-14.48
Québec solidaire	Michel Reesor	760	3.36	+0.56
Total valid votes		22,635	98.28	–
Total rejected ballots		397	1.72	–
Turnout		23,032	63.02	-11.50
Electors on the lists		36,550	–	–

2007 Quebec general election
Party	Candidate	Votes	%
Liberal	Yvon Vallières	11,257	42.32
Action démocratique	Pierre Hébert	8,179	30.75
Parti Québécois	Martyne Prévost	5,485	20.62
Green	Frédérick Clerson-Guicherd	805	3.03
Québec solidaire	Danielle Maire	746	2.80
Independent PQ	Claude Bergeron	129	0.48
Total valid votes		26,601	98.89
Total rejected ballots		298	1.11
Turnout		26,899	74.52
Electors on the lists		36,097	–

2003 Quebec general election
Party	Candidate	Votes	%
Liberal	Yvon Vallières	14,767	57.20
Parti Québécois	André Blais	6,149	23.82
Action démocratique	Pierre Hébert	4,899	18.98
Total valid votes		25,815	98.38
Total rejected ballots		426	1.62
Turnout		26,241	73.80
Electors on the lists		35,559	–

1998 Quebec general election
Party	Candidate	Votes	%
Liberal	Yvon Vallières	14,358	53.06
Parti Québécois	Joaquin Bastida	9,704	35.86
Action démocratique	Michel Grimard	2,998	11.08
Total valid votes		27,060	98.74
Total rejected ballots		346	1.26
Turnout		27,406	81.90
Electors on the lists		33,463	–

1995 Quebec referendum
Side	Votes	%
Oui	15,719	53.15
Non	13,856	46.85

1994 Quebec general election
Party	Candidate	Votes	%
Liberal	Yvon Vallières	14,106	54.28
Parti Québécois	Richard Arsenault	10,045	38.65
Action démocratique	Michael Betts	1,486	5.72
Natural Law	Jean Fréchette	197	0.76
Equality	Denis Keenan	154	0.59
Total valid votes		25,988	98.49
Total rejected ballots		399	1.51
Turnout		26,387	84.11
Electors on the lists		31,371	–

1992 Charlottetown Accord referendum
Side	Votes	%
Non	14,339	57.15
Oui	10,749	42.85

1989 Quebec general election
Party	Candidate	Votes	%
Liberal	Yvon Vallières	16,578	68.77
Parti Québécois	Richard Arsenault	6,259	25.96
Green	Jack Kugelmass	555	2.30
Unity	Thelma Westman	506	2.10
Parti 51	Michel Dostie	210	0.87
Total valid votes		24,108	98.08
Total rejected ballots		473	1.92
Turnout		24,581	79.80
Electors on the lists		30,804	–

1985 Quebec general election
Party	Candidate	Votes	%
Liberal	Yvon Vallières	12,356	63.81
Parti Québécois	Michel Vallières	6,824	35.24
Christian Socialism	Jean-Pierre Vaillancourt	184	0.95
Total valid votes		19,364	98.88
Total rejected ballots		219	1.12
Turnout		19,583	80.96
Electors on the lists		24,189	–

1981 Quebec general election
Party	Candidate	Votes	%
Liberal	Yvon Vallières	10,158	47.43
Parti Québécois	Denise Sckoropad Lemire	9,9905	46.25
Union Nationale	Benny Bell	1,354	2.36
Total valid votes		21,417	99.40
Total rejected ballots		130	0.60
Turnout		21,547	86.14
Electors on the lists		25,013	–

1980 Quebec referendum
Side	Votes	%
Non	12,371	59.58
Oui	8,393	40.42

1976 Quebec general election
Party	Candidate	Votes	%
Union Nationale	Yvon Brochu	7,778	39.15
Liberal	Yvon Vallières	5,871	29.55
Parti Québécois	Maurice Tremblay	5,294	26.65
Ralliement créditiste	Serge Lepage	925	4.65
Total valid votes		19,868	98.01
Total rejected ballots		404	1.99
Turnout		20,272	86.17
Electors on the lists		23,525	–

1973 Quebec general election
Party	Candidate	Votes	%
Liberal	Yvon Vallières	7,569	40.69
Ralliement créditiste	Yvon Brochu	7,214	38.79
Parti Québécois	Denis Morel	3,130	16.83
Union Nationale	Jacqueline Drouin Pelletier	686	3.69
Total valid votes		18,599	98.01
Total rejected ballots		182	0.97
Turnout		18,781	82.28
Electors on the lists		22,827	–

1970 Quebec general election
Party	Candidate	Votes	%
Ralliement créditiste	Yvon Brochu	7,485	36.02
Liberal	Raymond Allaire	6,348	30.55
Parti Québécois	Maurice Tremblay	3,655	17.59
Union Nationale	Marc-André Gosselin	3,290	15.83
Total valid votes		20,778	98.55
Total rejected ballots		305	1.45
Turnout		21,083	86.70
Electors on the lists		24,316	–

1966 Quebec general election
Party	Candidate	Votes	%
Liberal	Émilien Lafrance	8,258	47.56
Union Nationale	Lucien Bachand	7,995	46.04
Ralliement national	André Bergeron	1,112	6.40
Total valid votes		17,365	97.03
Total rejected ballots		531	2.97
Turnout		17,896	77.79
Electors on the lists		23,007	–

1962 Quebec general election
Party	Candidate	Votes	%
Liberal	Émilien Lafrance	9,932	57.88
Union Nationale	Raynald Fréchette	7,229	42.12
Total valid votes		17,161	99.00
Total rejected ballots		174	1.00
Turnout		17,335	85.16
Electors on the lists		20,356	–

1960 Quebec general election
Party	Candidate	Votes	%
Liberal	Émilien Lafrance	9,691	53.50
Union Nationale	Charles-Émile Gosselin	8,422	46.50
Total valid votes		18,113	98.79
Total rejected ballots		222	1.21
Turnout		18,335	90.57
Electors on the lists		20,244	–

1956 Quebec general election
Party	Candidate	Votes	%
Liberal	Émilien Lafrance	9,470	51.49
Union Nationale	Éphrem Jacques	8,278	47.46
Labor–Progressive	Jacques Messier	194	1.05
Total valid votes		18,392	99.28
Total rejected ballots		134	0.72
Turnout		18,526	90.47
Electors on the lists		20,477	–

1952 Quebec general election
Party	Candidate	Votes	%
Liberal	Émilien Lafrance	8,156	51.07
Union Nationale	Albert Goudreau	7,815	48.93
Total valid votes		15,971	99.20
Total rejected ballots		129	0.80
Turnout		16,100	87.33
Electors on the lists		18,435	–

1948 Quebec general election
Party	Candidate	Votes	%
Union Nationale	Albert Goudreau	7,135	50.00
Liberal	Albert Paquette	4,351	30.49
Union des électeurs	Roland Pelletier	2,783	19.50
Total valid votes		14,269	99.23
Total rejected ballots		111	0.77
Turnout		14,380	84.70
Electors on the lists		16,978	–

1944 Quebec general election
Party	Candidate	Votes	%
Union Nationale	Albert Goudreau	5,626	45.03
Liberal	Stanislas-Edmond Desmarais	5,344	42.77
Bloc populaire	Joseph-Fidèle Lavigne	1,525	12.20
Total valid votes		12,495	99.19
Total rejected ballots		102	0.81
Turnout		12,597	81.48
Electors on the lists		15,461	–

1939 Quebec general election
Party	Candidate	Votes	%
Liberal	Stanislas-Edmond Desmarais	2,998	52.55
Union Nationale	Albert Goudreau	2,314	40.56
Action libérale nationale	Alfred Laflamme	393	6.89
Total valid votes		5,705	99.06
Total rejected ballots		54	0.94
Turnout		5,759	82.92
Electors on the lists		6,945	–

1935 Quebec general election
Party	Candidate	Votes	%
Conservative	Albert Goudreau	3,170	55.58
Liberal	Stanislas-Edmond Desmarais	2,533	44.42
Total valid votes		5,703	99.74
Total rejected ballots		15	0.26
Turnout		5,718	83.23
Electors on the lists		6,870	–

1931 Quebec general election
Party	Candidate	Votes	%
Liberal	Stanislas-Edmond Desmarais	2,915	59.81
Conservative	Albert Goudreau	1,959	40.19
Total valid votes		4,874	99.49
Total rejected ballots		25	0.51
Turnout		4,899	79.93
Electors on the lists		6,129	–

1927 Quebec general election
Party	Candidate	Votes	%
Liberal	Stanislas-Edmond Desmarais	2,505	58.64
Conservative	Joseph-Noé Ponton	1,767	41.36
Total valid votes		4,272	99.37
Total rejected ballots		27	0.63
Turnout		4,299	74.65
Electors on the lists		5,766	–

Quebec provincial by-election, 1923
Party	Candidate	Votes	%
Liberal	Stanislas-Edmond Desmarais	2,165	55.71
Conservative	Joseph-Hilaire Côté	1,721	44.29
Total valid votes		3,886	98.21
Total rejected ballots		71	1.79
Turnout		3,957	73.58
Electors on the lists		5,378	–

1923 Quebec general election
Party	Candidate	Votes	%
Liberal	Georges-Ervé Denault	1,571	41.47
Conservative	John Hayes	1,268	44.29
Farmer	Alcide Roy	949	25.05
Total valid votes		3,788	99.01
Total rejected ballots		38	0.99
Turnout		3,826	71.14
Electors on the lists		5,378	–

Quebec provincial by-election, 1921
Party	Candidate	Votes
Liberal	Jacob Nicol	Acclaimed

1919 Quebec general election
Party	Candidate	Votes
Liberal	Walter George Mitchell	Acclaimed
Electors on the lists		5,009

1916 Quebec general election
Party	Candidate	Votes
Liberal	Walter George Mitchell	Acclaimed
Electors on the lists		5,065

Quebec provincial by-election, 1914
Party	Candidate	Votes
Liberal	Walter George Mitchell	Acclaimed

1912 Quebec general election
Party	Candidate	Votes	%
Liberal	Peter Samuel George Mackenzie	2,605	69.56
Conservative	William Evander McIver	1,140	30.44
Total valid votes		3,745	99.21
Total rejected ballots		30	0.79
Turnout		3,775	68.36
Electors on the lists		5,522	–

Quebec provincial by-election, 1910
Party	Candidate	Votes
Liberal	Peter Samuel George Mackenzie	Acclaimed

1908 Quebec general election
Party	Candidate	Votes
Liberal	Peter Samuel George Mackenzie	Acclaimed
Electors on the lists		5,031

1904 Quebec general election
Party	Candidate	Votes
Liberal	Peter Samuel George Mackenzie	Acclaimed
Electors on the lists		4,700

1900 Quebec general election
Party	Candidate	Votes	%
Liberal	Peter Samuel George Mackenzie	1,561	51.08
Conservative	Joseph Bédard	1,495	48.92
Total valid votes		3,056	98.64
Total rejected ballots		42	1.36
Turnout		3,098	67.95
Electors on the lists		4,559	–

1897 Quebec general election
Party	Candidate	Votes	%
Conservative	Joseph Bédard	1,748	52.97
Liberal	Charles A. Miller	1,552	47.03
Total valid votes		3,300	98.92
Total rejected ballots		36	1.08
Turnout		3,336	71.13
Electors on the lists		4,690	–

1892 Quebec general election
Party	Candidate	Votes	%
Conservative	Joseph Bédard	1,370	53.49
Liberal	Joseph R. Denison	1,191	46.51
Total valid votes		2,561	99.11
Total rejected ballots		23	0.89
Turnout		2,584	65.70
Electors on the lists		3,933	–

1892 Quebec general election
Party	Candidate	Votes	%
Conservative	Joseph Bédard	1,276	54.67
Liberal	Henry Aylmer	1,058	45.33
Total valid votes		2,334	99.07
Total rejected ballots		22	0.93
Turnout		2,356	64.06
Electors on the lists		3,678	–

== See also ==
- List of Quebec provincial electoral districts
- Canadian provincial electoral districts
