= 2000 Richmond, Quebec, municipal election =

The 2002 Richmond municipal election took place on April 30, 2000, to elect a mayor and councillors in Richmond, Quebec. The election was called after the municipality of Melbourne was merged with Richmond.

== Results ==
2000 Richmond election, Mayor of Bromont
Candidate	Total votes	% of total votes
(incumbent)Marc-André Martel	accl.	.

2000 Richmond election, Councillor, District One
Candidate	Total votes	% of total votes
Charles Mallette	accl.	.

2000 Richmond election, Councillor, District Two
Candidate	Total votes	% of total votes
Paul Gifford	67	67.78
Jacques Champagne	32	32.32
Total valid votes	99	100.00

2000 Richmond election, Councillor, District Three
Candidate	Total votes	% of total votes
(incumbent)Réal Veilleux	170	72.65
Yvan Tremblay	64	27.35
Total valid votes	234	100.00

2000 Richmond election, Councillor, District Four
Candidate	Total votes	% of total votes
(incumbent)Ghyslaine Bilodeau	accl.	.

2000 Richmond election, Councillor, District Five
Candidate	Total votes	% of total votes
(incumbent)Daniel Ménard	accl.	.

2000 Richmond election, Councillor, District Six
Candidate	Total votes	% of total votes
(incumbent)Jean-Guy Berthiaume	131	71.98
André Charest	51	18.02
Total valid votes	182	100.00

2000 Richmond election, Councillor, District Seven
Candidate	Total votes	% of total votes
(incumbent)Georges-Henri Poulin	89	70.08
Jocelyn Bastien	38	29.92
Total valid votes	127	100.00

Source: Stephen McDougall, "Richmond elects 22-year-old student: Re-elects three incumbents to town council," Sherbrooke Record, 2 May 2000, p. 7.
