= Joseph-Adéodat Blanchette =

Canadian politician (1893–1968)

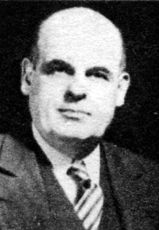

Member of the Canadian Parliament for Compton (1935-1949) Compton—Frontenac (1949-1958)
- In office 1935–1958
- Preceded by: Samuel Gobeil
- Succeeded by: George Stearns

Personal details
- Born: August 7, 1893 Acton Vale, Quebec, Canada
- Died: November 14, 1968 (aged 75) Quebec, Canada
- Party: Liberal
- Occupation: merchant

Joseph-Adéodat Blanchette (August 7, 1893 – November 14, 1968) was a Canadian politician and merchant. He was elected to the House of Commons of Canada as a Member of the Liberal Party to represent the riding of Compton. During his time in parliament, he was the Chief Government Whip's assistant and Deputy Whip of the Liberal Party. He later became the Parliamentary Assistant to the Minister of National Defence followed by Parliamentary Assistant to the Minister of Labour.

1935 Canadian federal election: Compton
Party	Candidate	Votes
Liberal	Joseph-Adéodat Blanchette	7,388
Conservative	Samuel Gobeil	6,374

1940 Canadian federal election: Compton
Party	Candidate	Votes
Liberal	Joseph-Adéodat Blanchette	8,012
National Government	Joseph-Alfred Laforest	1,623

1945 Canadian federal election: Compton
Party	Candidate	Votes
Liberal	Joseph-Adéodat Blanchette	8,007
Progressive Conservative	Samuel Gobeil	3,506
Bloc populaire	Aurélien Quintin	1,622
Social Credit	Gérard Houle	1,065
Co-operative Commonwealth	R. Barton Carr	486
