= Karine Vallières =

Canadian politician

Member of the National Assembly of Quebec for Richmond
- In office September 4, 2012 – October 1, 2018
- Preceded by: Yvon Vallières
- Succeeded by: André Bachand

Personal details
- Born: March 19, 1978 (age 47); Danville, Quebec, Canada
- Political party: Quebec Liberal
- Parent: Yvon Vallieres (father)

Karine Vallières (born March 19, 1978) is a Canadian politician who served as a member of the National Assembly of Quebec for the riding of Richmond, first elected in the 2012 election. She served until 2018.

She is the daughter of Yvon Vallières, who previously served as MNA for Richmond.
