= Joseph Bédard =

Canadian politician

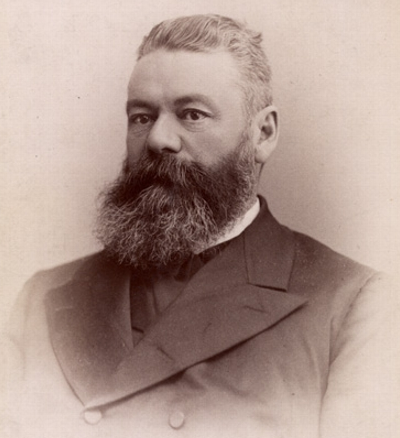

Member of the Legislative Assembly of Quebec for Richmond
- In office 1890–1900
- Preceded by: District created
- Succeeded by: Peter Mackenzie

Personal details
- Born: October 23, 1835 Saint-Roch, Quebec City, Lower Canada
- Died: May 4, 1912 (aged 76) Richmond, Quebec
- Party: Conservative

Joseph Bédard (October 23, 1835 – May 4, 1912) was a merchant and political figure in Quebec. He represented Richmond in the Legislative Assembly of Quebec from 1890 to 1900 as a Conservative.

He was born in Saint-Roch, Lower Canada, the son of Joseph Bédard and Louise L'Heureux. Bédard was a lumber merchant, mill owner and general merchant. He was a founder and president of the Richmond Saint-Jean-Baptiste Society. In 1860, he married Mary McGovern. He served 40 years on the municipal council for Richmond and was mayor from 1888 to 1890. Carrier also served on the school board. His election in 1890 was overturned in 1892 after an appeal but he was elected again in 1892. Bédard was defeated when he ran for reelection in 1900. He died in Richmond at the age of 76.
