= Compton (federal electoral district) =

Former federal electoral district in Quebec, Canada

Quebec electoral district

Defunct federal electoral district
- Legislature: House of Commons
- District created: 1966
- District abolished: 1996
- First contested: 1968
- Last contested: 1993

Compton (also known as Mégantic—Compton—Stanstead) was a federal electoral district in Quebec, Canada, that was represented in the House of Commons of Canada from 1867 to 1949, and again from 1968 to 1997.

== History ==
Compton was created by the British North America Act 1867. It consisted of the Townships of Compton, Westbury, Eaton, Clifton, Hereford, and Augmentation, Bury, Newport, Auckland, Lingwick, Hampden, Ditton, Winslow, Whitton, Marston, Chesham and part of the Township of Clinton.

In 1924, it was re-defined to consist of:

- the County of Compton;
- in the County of Stanstead: the township of Hereford;
- in the County of Sherbrooke: the municipalities of Compton (township and village) and Waterville; and
- in the County of Frontenac: the municipalities of Marston South, Ste. Cécile de Whitton, Chesham, Winslow South, Clinton, St. Léon de Marston, Winslow North and the town of Mégantic.

In 1933, it was expanded to include the townships of Eaton and Westbury in the village of Ascot Corner.

It was abolished in 1947 when it was redistributed into the Compton—Frontenac and Sherbrooke electoral districts.

It was re-created in 1966 from parts of Compton—Frontenac, Mégantic and Stanstead ridings. The new riding was defined to consist of:

- the Towns of Coaticook, Cookshire, East Angus, Lac-Mégantic, Rock Island, Scotstown and Waterville;
- the County of Compton;
- parts of the County of Frontenac;
- the county of Stanstead (except the village municipality of Omerville and the township municipality of Magog); and
- in the County of Sherbrooke: the village municipality of Compton; the township municipality of Compton; and the municipalities of Ascot Corner and Compton Station.

In 1976, it was expanded to include in the County of Stanstead: the village municipalities of Ayer's Cliff, Beebe Plain, Dixville, Hatley, North Hatley, Saint-Herménégilde and Stanstead Plain; the township municipalities of Barford, Barnston, Hatley, Hatley (West part) and Stanstead; the municipalities of Barnston West, Ogden, Sainte-Catherine-de-Hatley, Saint-Herménégilde, Saint-Mathieu-de-Dixville and Stanstead East.

It was renamed "Mégantic—Compton—Stanstead" in 1978.

In 1987, it was redefined to consist of:

- the Towns of Coaticook, Cookshire, East Angus, Lac-Mégantic, Rock Island, Scotstown and Waterville;
- the County of Compton;
- in the County of Frontenac: the parish municipalities of Courcelles, Saint-Augustin-de-Woburn and Val-Racine; the Township municipality of Marston; the municipalities of Audet, Frontenac, Lac-Drolet, Milan, Nantes, Notre-Dames-des-Bois, Piopolis, Sainte-Cécile-de-Whitton, Saint-Romain, Saint-Sébastien and Stornoway;
- in the County of Sherbrooke: the Township Municipality of Ascot; the Municipality of Ascot Corner;
- in the County of Stanstead excluding the following: the Town of Magog; the Village Municipality of Omerville; the Township Municipality of Magog;
- in the County of Wolfe: the village municipalities of Bishopton, Marbleton, Saint-Gérard and Weedon-Centre; the township municipalities of Dudswell, Stratford and Weedon; the municipality of Fontainebleau.

It was abolished in 1996 when it was merged into Compton—Stanstead riding.

== Members of Parliament ==
This riding elected the following members of Parliament:

Parliament	Years	Member	Party
Compton
1st	1867–1871	John Henry Pope	Liberal–Conservative
1st	1871–1872	John Henry Pope	Liberal–Conservative
2nd	1872–1874	John Henry Pope	Liberal–Conservative
3rd	1874–1878	John Henry Pope	Liberal–Conservative
4th	1878–1878	John Henry Pope	Liberal–Conservative
4th	1878–1882	John Henry Pope	Liberal–Conservative
5th	1882–1887	John Henry Pope	Liberal–Conservative
6th	1887–1889	John Henry Pope	Liberal–Conservative
6th	1889–1891	Rufus Henry Pope	Conservative
7th	1891–1896	Rufus Henry Pope	Conservative
8th	1896–1900	Rufus Henry Pope	Conservative
9th	1900–1904	Rufus Henry Pope	Conservative
10th	1904–1905	Aylmer Byron Hunt	Liberal
10th	1906–1908	Aylmer Byron Hunt	Liberal
11th	1908–1911	Aylmer Byron Hunt	Liberal
12th	1911–1917	Frederick Robert Cromwell	Conservative
13th	1917–1921	Aylmer Byron Hunt	Liberal
14th	1921–1925	Aylmer Byron Hunt	Liberal
15th	1925–1926	Joseph-Étienne Letellier de Saint-Just	Liberal
16th	1926–1930	Joseph-Étienne Letellier de Saint-Just	Liberal
17th	1930–1935	Samuel Gobeil	Conservative
18th	1935–1940	Joseph-Adéodat Blanchette	Liberal
19th	1940–1945	Joseph-Adéodat Blanchette	Liberal
20th	1945–1949	Joseph-Adéodat Blanchette	Liberal
Riding dissolved into Compton—Frontenac and Sherbrooke
Riding re-created from Compton—Frontenac, Mégantic and Stanstead
28th	1968–1971	Henry Latulippe	Ralliement créditiste
28th	1971–1972	Henry Latulippe	Social Credit
29th	1972–1974	Henry Latulippe	Social Credit
30th	1974–1979	Claude Tessier	Liberal
Mégantic—Compton—Stanstead
31st	1979–1980	Claude Tessier	Liberal
32nd	1980–1984	Claude Tessier	Liberal
33rd	1984–1988	François Gérin	Progressive Conservative
34th	1988–1993	François Gérin	Progressive Conservative
35th	1993–1997	Maurice Bernier	Bloc Québécois
Riding dissolved into Compton—Stanstead

== Election results ==
=== Compton, 1867–1949 ===
1867 Canadian federal election
Party	Candidate	Votes
Liberal–Conservative	John Henry Pope	acclaimed
Source: Canadian Elections Database

By-election: On Mr. Pope's appointment as Minister of Agriculture, 25 October 1871

By-election on 11 November 1871
Party	Candidate	Votes
Liberal–Conservative	John Henry Pope	acclaimed

1872 Canadian federal election
Party	Candidate	Votes
Liberal–Conservative	John Henry Pope	acclaimed
Source: Canadian Elections Database

1874 Canadian federal election
Party	Candidate	Votes
Liberal–Conservative	John Henry Pope	1,387
Unknown	H. E. Cairns	535
Source: Canadian Elections Database

1878 Canadian federal election
Party	Candidate	Votes
Liberal–Conservative	John Henry Pope	1,464
Unknown	H. Leonard	796

By-election: On Mr. Pope's appointment as Minister of Agriculture, 17 October 1878

By-election on 4 November 1878
Party	Candidate	Votes
Liberal–Conservative	John Henry Pope	acclaimed

1882 Canadian federal election
Party	Candidate	Votes
Liberal–Conservative	John Henry Pope	1,612
Unknown	H. E. Cairns	823

1887 Canadian federal election
Party	Candidate	Votes
Liberal–Conservative	John Henry Pope	2,157
Unknown	T. B. Munro	1,333

By-election: On Mr. Pope's death, 1 April 1889

By-election on 16 May 1889
Party	Candidate	Votes
Conservative	Rufus Henry Pope	acclaimed

1891 Canadian federal election
Party	Candidate	Votes
Conservative	Rufus Henry Pope	2,004
Liberal	S. P. Leet	938

1896 Canadian federal election
Party	Candidate	Votes
Conservative	Rufus Henry Pope	1,948
Patrons of Industry	Francis F. Wellard	1,485

1900 Canadian federal election
Party	Candidate	Votes
Conservative	Rufus Henry Pope	2,438
Liberal	Geo. B. Cleveland	2,190

1904 Canadian federal election
Party	Candidate	Votes
Liberal	Aylmer Byron Hunt	2,735
Conservative	Rufus Henry Pope	2,440

By-election: On election being declared void, Nov. 22, 1905

By-election on 4 January 1906
Party	Candidate	Votes
Liberal	Aylmer Byron Hunt	2,935
Conservative	Rufus Henry Pope	2,585

1908 Canadian federal election
Party	Candidate	Votes
Liberal	Aylmer Byron Hunt	3,175
Conservative	Rufus Henry Pope	2,781

1911 Canadian federal election
Party	Candidate	Votes
Conservative	Frederick Robert Cromwell	2,953
Liberal	Aylmer Byron Hunt	2,877

1917 Canadian federal election
Party	Candidate	Votes
Opposition (Laurier Liberals)	Aylmer Byron Hunt	4,418
Government (Unionist)	Kenneth Nicholson McIver	2,515

1921 Canadian federal election
Party	Candidate	Votes
Liberal	Aylmer Byron Hunt	7,866
Conservative	Frederick Robert Cromwell	3,961

1925 Canadian federal election
Party	Candidate	Votes
Liberal	Joseph-Étienne Letellier de Saint-Just	6,497
Conservative	Samuel Gobeil	4,262

1926 Canadian federal election
Party	Candidate	Votes
Liberal	Joseph-Étienne Letellier de Saint-Just	7,125
Conservative	Samuel Gobeil	4,979

1930 Canadian federal election
Party	Candidate	Votes
Conservative	Samuel Gobeil	6,701
Liberal	Joseph-Étienne Letellier de Saint-Just	6,393
Source: lop.parl.ca

1935 Canadian federal election
Party	Candidate	Votes
Liberal	Joseph-Adéodat Blanchette	7,388
Conservative	Samuel Gobeil	6,374

1940 Canadian federal election
Party	Candidate	Votes
Liberal	Joseph-Adéodat Blanchette	8,012
National Government	Joseph-Alfred Laforest	1,623

1945 Canadian federal election
Party	Candidate	Votes
Liberal	Joseph-Adéodat Blanchette	8,007
Progressive Conservative	Samuel Gobeil	3,506
Bloc populaire	Aurélien Quintin	1,622
Social Credit	Gérard Houle	1,065
Co-operative Commonwealth	R. Barton Carr	486

=== Compton, 1968–1979 ===
1968 Canadian federal election
Party	Candidate	Votes
Ralliement créditiste	Henry Latulippe	11,961
Liberal	Léger Cameron	8,615
Progressive Conservative	Luc Bourque	3,987
New Democratic	Curtis Lowry	851

1972 Canadian federal election
Party	Candidate	Votes
Social Credit	Henry Latulippe	11,636
New Democratic	Duncan J. M. Graham	10,982
Liberal	Claude Tessier	10,656
Progressive Conservative	Guy-C. Gauvin	4,142
Independent	Conrad Descoteaux	182

1974 Canadian federal election
Party	Candidate	Votes
Liberal	Claude Tessier	11,474
Social Credit	Henry Latulippe	9,917
Progressive Conservative	Guy Lapointe	4,407
New Democratic	Duncan J. M. Graham	858
lop.parl.ca

=== Mégantic—Compton—Stanstead, 1979–1997 ===
1979 Canadian federal election
Party	Candidate	Votes
Liberal	Claude Tessier	19,309
Social Credit	Henry Latulippe	9,047
Progressive Conservative	Claude G. Gosselin	7,463
New Democratic	Murray Dale Powell	1,316
Union populaire	Robert Huberdeau	281

1980 Canadian federal election
Party	Candidate	Votes
Liberal	Claude Tessier	21,562
Progressive Conservative	Fernand Grenier	10,336
Social Credit	Léonel Drouin	3,023
New Democratic	Keith Taylor	1,769
Rhinoceros	D. Gavroche Gosselin	1,002
lop.parl.ca

1984 Canadian federal election
Party	Candidate	Votes
Progressive Conservative	François Gérin	25,679
Liberal	Claude Tessier	13,123
New Democratic	Jean-Pierre Walsh	2,690
Green	Andrew McCammon	454
Parti nationaliste	Michel Houde	427
Social Credit	Robert Bélanger	399
Commonwealth of Canada	Ronald A. Javitch	51

1988 Canadian federal election
Party	Candidate	Votes
Progressive Conservative	François Gérin	23,246
Liberal	Jean-Guy Landry	11,566
New Democratic	Jean-Pierre Walsh	3,195
Social Credit	Yvan Lanctot	550

1993 Canadian federal election
Party	Candidate	Votes
Bloc Québécois	Maurice Bernier	17,317
Liberal	Eugene Naylor	13,538
Progressive Conservative	Gilles Goddard	6,042
Natural Law	Jacqueline Benoît	767
New Democratic	Martine Simard	495
Abolitionist	Marco Bissonnette	215
National	James Stewart	198

== See also ==
- List of Canadian electoral districts
- Historical federal electoral districts of Canada
