= John Sewell Sanborn =

Canadian politician

The Hon. John Sewell Sanborn
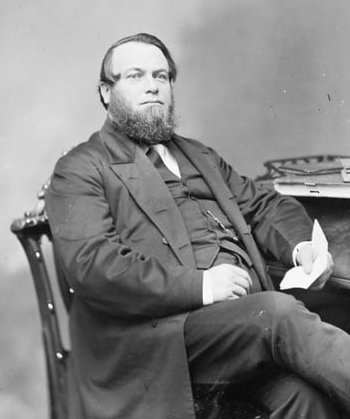

Senator for Wellington, Quebec
- In office October 23, 1867 – October 1872
- Appointed by: Royal Proclamation
- Succeeded by: Matthew Henry Cochrane

Personal details
- Born: January 1, 1819 Gilmanton, New Hampshire
- Died: July 17, 1877 (aged 58) Asbury Park, New Jersey
- Party: Liberal
- Education: Dartmouth College; University of Bishop’s College

John Sewell Sanborn (January 1, 1819 – July 17, 1877) was a Canadian educator, lawyer, judge and political figure. Some sources give his middle name as Sewall.

He was born in Gilmanton, New Hampshire and graduated from Dartmouth College, later studying at the University of Bishop's College in Lennoxville, Quebec. He was the principal at a secondary school in Sherbrooke. He later articled in law and was called to the bar in 1847.

He was elected to the 3rd Parliament of the Province of Canada representing Sherbrooke County in a by-election in March 1850. At the time, he supported annexation of the Eastern Townships with the United States. He was re-elected in 1851, no longer supporting annexation. The annexation issue had played an important role in establishing a rail link connecting the region to Maine. In 1854, he was elected in Compton. In 1863, he was acclaimed to the Legislative Council for Wellington division and he was re-elected in 1864. He supported an elected Senate in the discussions leading up to Confederation. In 1867, he was appointed to the new Senate of Canada. In 1872, he was appointed to the Quebec Superior Court for Saint-François district and he was appointed to the Court of Queen's Bench at Montreal in 1874.

He died at Asbury Park, New Jersey in 1877.
