= John Henry Pope =

Canadian politician

The Honourable John Henry Pope PC
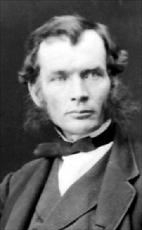

Member of the Canadian Parliament for Compton
- In office 1867–1889
- Succeeded by: Rufus Henry Pope

Personal details
- Born: 19 December 1819 Eaton Township, Lower Canada
- Died: 1 April 1889 (aged 69) Ottawa, Ontario, Canada
- Party: Liberal-Conservative
- Children: Rufus Henry Pope
- Cabinet: Minister of Agriculture; Minister of Railways and Canals

John Henry Pope, PC (19 December 1819 – 1 April 1889) was a Canadian farmer, lumberman, railway entrepreneur, and politician.

Born in Eaton Township, Lower Canada (now Quebec), the son of John Pope and Sophia Laberee, he served with the local militia during the Lower Canada Rebellion of 1837 and opposed those who supported annexation of Eastern Townships to the United States.

He represented Compton County in the Legislative Assembly of the Province of Canada from 1857 to 1867 and was elected to the 1st Canadian Parliament in 1867 representing the riding of Compton as a member of the Liberal-Conservative Party. He was the Minister of Agriculture and the Minister of Railways and Canals. He served until his death in 1889. His son, Rufus Henry, took his seat after his death.

== Electoral history ==
1867 Canadian federal election: Compton
Party	Candidate	Votes
Liberal–Conservative	John Henry Pope	acclaimed
Source: Canadian Elections Database

By-election: On Mr. Pope's appointment as Minister of Agriculture, 25 October 1871

By-election on 11 November 1871
Party	Candidate	Votes
Liberal–Conservative	John Henry Pope	acclaimed

1872 Canadian federal election: Compton
Party	Candidate	Votes
Liberal–Conservative	John Henry Pope	acclaimed
Source: Canadian Elections Database

1874 Canadian federal election: Compton
Party	Candidate	Votes
Liberal–Conservative	John Henry Pope	1,387
Unknown	H. E. Cairns	535
Source: Canadian Elections Database

1878 Canadian federal election: Compton
Party	Candidate	Votes
Liberal–Conservative	John Henry Pope	1,464
Unknown	H. Leonard	796
Source: Canadian Elections Database

By-election: On Mr. Pope's appointment as Minister of Agriculture, 17 October 1878

By-election on 4 November 1878
Party	Candidate	Votes
Liberal–Conservative	John Henry Pope	acclaimed

1882 Canadian federal election: Compton
Party	Candidate	Votes
Liberal–Conservative	John Henry Pope	1,612
Unknown	H. E. Cairns	823

1887 Canadian federal election: Compton
Party	Candidate	Votes
Liberal–Conservative	John Henry Pope	2,157
Unknown	T. B. Munro	1,333
