= Yvon Brochu =

Canadian politician

Member of the Quebec National Assembly for Richmond
- In office 1970–1973
- Preceded by: Émilien Lafrance
- Succeeded by: Yvon Vallières

Member of the Quebec National Assembly for Richmond
- In office 1976–1981
- Preceded by: Yvon Vallières
- Succeeded by: Yvon Vallières

Personal details
- Born: April 25, 1944 (age 82) Asbestos, Quebec
- Party: Ralliement créditiste du Québec
- Other political affiliations: Union Nationale
- Occupation: psychologist, translator, minister

Yvon Brochu (French pronunciation: [ivɔ̃ bʁɔʃy]; born April 25, 1944) was a politician in Quebec, Canada, and a Member of the National Assembly of Quebec (MNA).

== Background ==
He was born in Asbestos, Quebec, on April 25, 1944, and was a psychologist.

== First term ==
Brochu ran as a candidate of the newly formed provincial wing of the Ralliement créditiste in 1970 and won, becoming the Member of the National Assembly for the district of Richmond.

His party was plagued by internal divisions. While three MNAs remained loyal to the leader, Camil Samson, the rest of the caucus, including Brochu, withdrew their support and appointed Armand Bois as temporary leader, until a leadership convention could determine a new leader.

A year later, Yvon Dupuis was chosen as leader. Nonetheless, Brochu and most of his colleagues lost their bid for re-election in 1973. Brochu lost his against the Liberal Yvon Vallières.

== Second term ==
Brochu joined a group of Créditiste dissidents called Parti présidentiel in 1974 and became its leader in 1975. Subsequently, the Parti présidentiel merged with the Union Nationale.

Brochu won back his seat to the legislature as a Union Nationale candidate. He also served as his party's House Leader from 1979 to 1980.

He did not run for re-election in 1981. Vallières succeeded him again.

== Retirement from politics ==
After he retired from politics, Brochu worked as a translator and as an ordained minister.
