= Bernard Sévigny =

Canadian mayor

Bernard Sévigny MNA
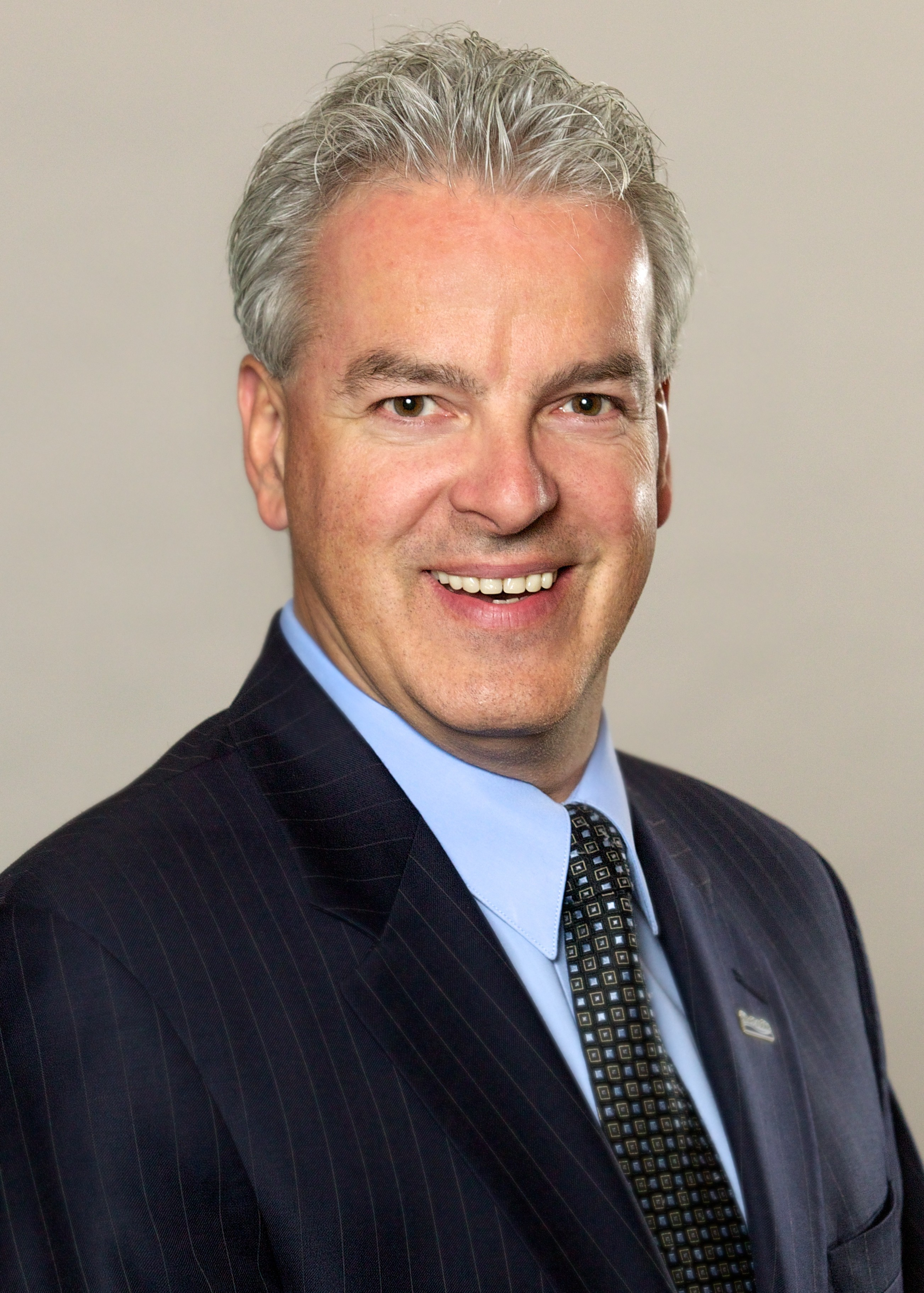
- Bernard Sevigny

Member of the National Assembly for Richmond
- Incumbent
- Assumed office October 5, 2026
- Preceded by: André Bachand

Mayor of Sherbrooke
- In office November 12, 2009 – November 5, 2017
- Preceded by: Jean Perrault
- Succeeded by: Steve Lussier

Personal details
- Born: December 18, 1961 (age 64) Montreal, Quebec
- Party: Parti Québécois
- Other political affiliations: Renouveau sherbrookois
- Spouse: Marie-Claude Bibeau

Bernard Sévigny (born 18 December 1961) is a Canadian politician, who was mayor of Sherbrooke, Quebec from 2009 to 2017. He is the current Member of the National Assembly (Quebec) in Richmond for the Parti Québécois. He is also Minister of Agriculture, Fisheries and Food, and Minister Responsible for the Estrie Region.

== Education ==
Sévigny has a Bachelor of Arts in Political Science and French from the University of Alberta. He has a certificate in information and journalism from the Université de Montréal. He also holds a Bachelor's degree in Economics, as well as a Master's degree in the management and development of co-operatives, and a doctor of business administration from the Université de Sherbrooke.

== Career ==
Sévigny was a journalist for TVA from 1989 to 1999. He was a professor in the faculty of administration at the Université de Sherbrooke from 2007 to 2009.

== Political career ==
Sévigny was elected as a city councillor to Sherbrooke City Council in the 2001 Sherbrooke municipal election. He was re-elected in the 2005 municipal election and served until the 2009 municipal election.

He was elected mayor of Sherbrooke on November 12, 2009, following the 2009 municipal election. Sévigny won by just 122 votes over challenger Hélène Gravel on election day. Gravel requested a recount, but was denied by a court ruling.

In May 2026, he announced his candidacy for the Parti Québécois in the 2026 Quebec general election. On October 5, Sevigny was elected as Member of the National Assembly for Richmond.

== Personal life ==
Sévigny is married to current Sherbrooke mayor Marie-Claude Bibeau.

== Electoral record ==
2026 Quebec general election: Richmond
** Preliminary results — Not yet official **
Party	Candidate	Votes	%	±%
Parti Québécois	Bernard Sévigny	12,718	29.23	
Conservative	Dominic Bouffard	9,956	22.88	
Liberal	Hugo Fontaine	9,906	22.77	
Coalition Avenir Québec	Guillaume Rousseau	5,767	13.26	
Québec solidaire	David Poulin-Latulippe	4,597	10.57	
Climat Québec	Pierre-Olivier Lassonde	243	0.56	
Independent	Christophe Duret	197	0.45	
Présence	Alexane Roy	124	0.29	
Total valid votes				
Total rejected ballots				
Turnout			74.27	
Electors on the lists			–	–
Parti Québécois gain from Coalition Avenir Québec		Swing		+
Source: Élections Québec

== See also ==
- Sherbrooke
- Parti Québécois
