= Walter George Mitchell =

Canadian lawyer and politician

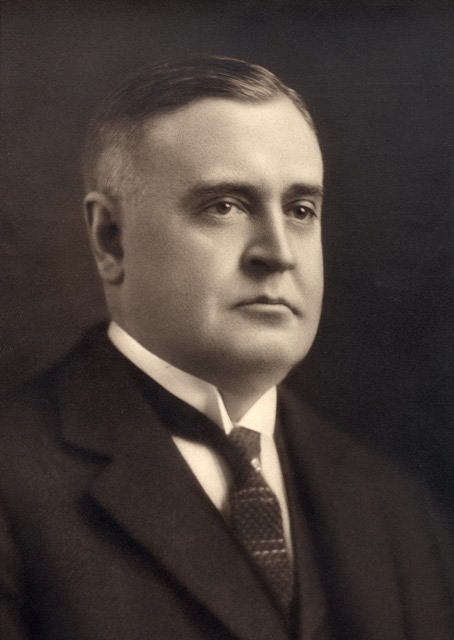

Member of the Canadian Parliament for St. Antoine
- In office 1921–1924
- Preceded by: Herbert Brown Ames
- Succeeded by: William James Hushion

Member of the Legislative Assembly of Quebec for Richmond
- In office 1914–1921
- Preceded by: Peter Samuel George Mackenzie
- Succeeded by: Jacob Nicol

Personal details
- Born: May 30, 1877 Danby (Lefebvre), Quebec, Canada
- Died: April 3, 1935 (aged 57) Montreal, Quebec, Canada
- Party: Liberal
- Other political affiliations: Quebec Liberal Party
- Relations: William Mitchell, father
- Cabinet: Quebec: Treasurer (1914-1921); Minister of Municipal Affairs (1918-1921)

Walter George Mitchell, KC (May 30, 1877 – April 3, 1935) was a Canadian lawyer and politician.

== Early life ==
Born in Danby, Quebec, the son of William Mitchell, a Canadian senator, and Dora Godard, Mitchell was educated at the Montreal High School, Bishop's College, and McGill University where he received a Bachelor of Civil Law degree in 1901 and was a charter member of Kappa Alpha Society.

== Career ==
After being called to the Quebec Bar in 1901, he practiced law with the law firm of Greenshields, Greenshields & Heneker. He soon was part of the firm Laflamme, Mitchell and Callaghan and was created a King's Counsel in 1912.

He was acclaimed to the Legislative Assembly of Quebec for the electoral district of Richmond in a 1914 by-election called after the death of Peter Samuel George Mackenzie. A Liberal, he was re-elected by acclamation in 1916 and in 1919. He was Treasurer of the Province of Quebec from 1914 to 1921 in the cabinet of Lomer Gouin and Louis-Alexandre Taschereau.

From 1918 to 1921, he was Minister of Municipal Affairs. He resigned in 1921 and was elected to the House of Commons of Canada for the electoral district of St. Antoine. A Liberal, he resigned in May 1924. He ran again in the 1930 election for the electoral district of Richmond—Wolfe but was defeated.

== See also ==
- List of Bishop's College School alumni
