= Joseph-Étienne Letellier de Saint-Just =

Canadian politician

Member of Parliament for Compton
- In office October 1925 – May 1930
- Preceded by: Aylmer Byron Hunt
- Succeeded by: Samuel Gobeil

Personal details
- Born: Joseph-Étienne Letellier de Saint-Just; 25 February 1880 Saint-David-de-Lévis, Quebec, Canada
- Died: 7 July 1939 (aged 59)
- Party: Liberal
- Spouse(s): Alexina Moussette m. 26 August 1901
- Profession: jeweller

Joseph-Étienne Letellier de Saint-Just (25 February 1880 – 7 July 1939) was a Liberal party member of the House of Commons of Canada. He was born in Saint-David-de-Lévis, Quebec and became a jeweller and an alderman and mayor of Lac-Mégantic, Quebec.

Letellier de Saint-Just attended Saint Jean Baptiste Academy at Lac-Mégantic, Quebec. Beginning in 1901, he was an official time inspector for the Quebec Central Railway and the Canadian Pacific Railway. He served as alderman and mayor of Lac Mégantic for nine years and was a director of the Board of Trade in that community.

He was first elected to Parliament at the Compton riding in the 1925 general election then re-elected in 1926. He was defeated by Samuel Gobeil of the Conservatives in the 1930 federal election.

== Electoral record ==
1925 Canadian federal election: Compton
Party	Candidate	Votes
Liberal	Joseph-Étienne Letellier de Saint-Just	6,497
Conservative	Samuel Gobeil	4,262

1926 Canadian federal election: Compton
Party	Candidate	Votes
Liberal	Joseph-Étienne Letellier de Saint-Just	7,125
Conservative	Samuel Gobeil	4,979
