= Rufus Henry Pope =

Canadian politician

The Hon. Rufus Henry Pope
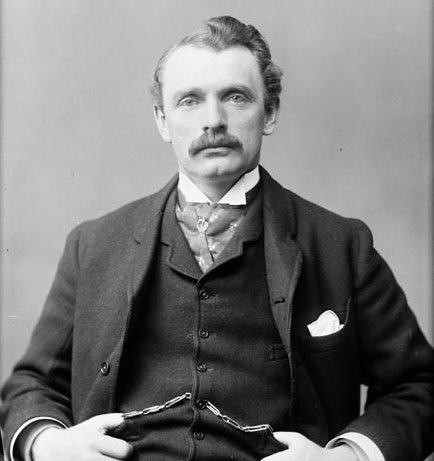

Senator for Bedford, Quebec
- In office November 14, 1911 – May 16, 1944
- Appointed by: Robert Borden
- Preceded by: George Barnard Baker
- Succeeded by: Jacob Nicol

Member of the Canadian Parliament for Compton
- In office 1889–1904
- Preceded by: John Henry Pope
- Succeeded by: Aylmer Byron Hunt

Personal details
- Born: September 13, 1857 Cookshire, Canada East
- Died: May 16, 1944 (aged 86) Cookshire, Quebec
- Party: Conservative
- Relations: John Henry Pope, father

Rufus Henry Pope (September 13, 1857 – May 16, 1944) was a Canadian politician.

Born in Cookshire, Canada East, the son of John Henry Pope, Pope was educated at the Cookshire Academy, Sherbrooke High School and McGill College Law School. He was a farmer and breeder of thoroughbred cattle. He was first elected to the House of Commons of Canada for the electoral district of Compton in an 1889 by-election called to fill the vacancy caused by the death of his father. A Conservative, he was re-elected in 1891, 1896, and 1900. He was defeated in 1904, in a 1906 by-election, and in 1908. He was called to the Senate of Canada representing the senatorial division of Bedford, Quebec on the advice of Robert Borden in 1911. He served until his death in 1944 at his home in Cookshire.

== Electoral record ==
By-election: On Mr. Pope's death, 1 April 1889

By-election on 16 May 1889
Party	Candidate	Votes
Conservative	Rufus Henry Pope	acclaimed

1891 Canadian federal election: Compton
Party	Candidate	Votes
Conservative	Rufus Henry Pope	2,004
Liberal	S. P. Leet	938

1896 Canadian federal election: Compton
Party	Candidate	Votes
Conservative	Rufus Henry Pope	1,948
Patrons of Industry	Francis F. Wellard	1,485

1900 Canadian federal election: Compton
Party	Candidate	Votes
Conservative	Rufus Henry Pope	2,438
Liberal	Geo. B. Cleveland	2,190

1904 Canadian federal election: Compton
Party	Candidate	Votes
Liberal	Aylmer Byron Hunt	2,735
Conservative	Rufus Henry Pope	2,440

By-election: On election being declared void, Nov. 22, 1905

By-election on 4 January 1906
Party	Candidate	Votes
Liberal	Aylmer Byron Hunt	2,935
Conservative	Rufus Henry Pope	2,585

1908 Canadian federal election: Compton
Party	Candidate	Votes
Liberal	Aylmer Byron Hunt	3,175
Conservative	Rufus Henry Pope	2,781
