= Samuel Gobeil =

Canadian politician

The Hon. Samuel Gobeil

Member of the Canadian Parliament for Compton
- In office 1930–1935
- Preceded by: Joseph Étienne Letellier de Saint-Just
- Succeeded by: Joseph-Adéodat Blanchette

Personal details
- Born: 17 August 1875 La Patrie, Quebec, Canada
- Died: 1 January 1961 (aged 85)
- Party: Conservative
- Cabinet: Postmaster General (1935)

Samuel Gobeil, PC (17 August 1875 – 1 January 1961) was a Canadian politician.

Born in La Patrie, Quebec, he was defeated twice (in 1925 and 1926) before being elected to the House of Commons of Canada representing the Quebec riding of Compton in the 1930 federal election. A Conservative, he was defeated in 1935 and 1940. In 1935, he was briefly the Postmaster General.

1925 Canadian federal election: Compton
Party	Candidate	Votes
Liberal	Joseph-Étienne Letellier de Saint-Just	6,497
Conservative	Samuel Gobeil	4,262

1926 Canadian federal election: Compton
Party	Candidate	Votes
Liberal	Joseph-Étienne Letellier de Saint-Just	7,125
Conservative	Samuel Gobeil	4,979

1930 Canadian federal election: Compton
Party	Candidate	Votes
Conservative	Samuel Gobeil	6,701
Liberal	Joseph-Étienne Letellier de Saint-Just	6,393
Source: lop.parl.ca
