= Émilien Lafrance =

Canadian politician

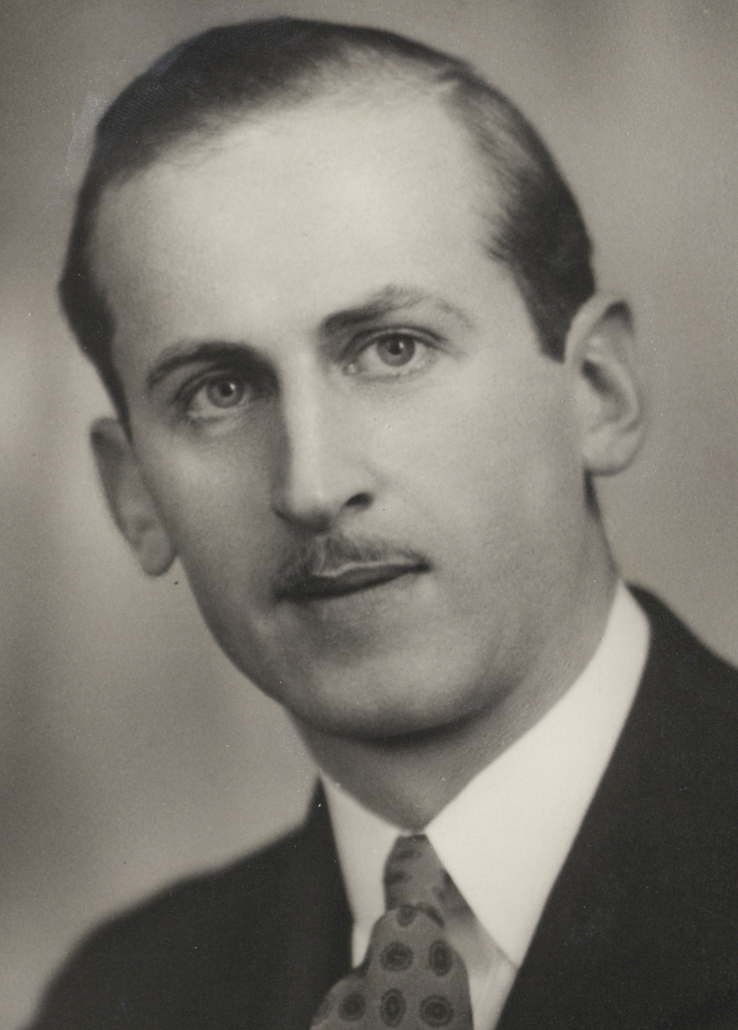

Member of the Quebec National Assembly for Richmond
- In office 1952–1970
- Preceded by: Albert Goudreau
- Succeeded by: Yvon Brochu

Personal details
- Born: September 6, 1911 Danville, Quebec
- Died: October 21, 1977 (aged 66) Lac Memphrémagog, Quebec
- Resting place: Danville, Quebec
- Party: Quebec Liberal Party
- Occupation: Traveling salesman, realtor

Émilien Lafrance (September 6, 1911 – October 21, 1977) was a Canadian politician, cabinet minister and a five-term Member of the National Assembly of Quebec.

== Background ==
Lafrance was born in 1911 in the Quebec town of Danville. He studied at Séminaire Saint-Charles-Borromée in Sherbrooke and Collège Sacré-Cœur in Victoriaville.

He married his wife Géraldine Langlois in Magog in 1942. Together, he and Langlois had five children. In a 2010 interview with Le Devoir, Madame Langlois said that her husband tried to avoid talking politics at home, especially due to their disagreements on Quebec sovereignty.

== Early politics ==
Lafrance was politically involved long before his first election to the National Assembly. He served as a local organizer for Action libérale nationale in the 1935 election and ran as a member of the Bloc populaire in the riding of Richmond—Wolfe in the 1945 federal election, coming in a distant second to the local Liberal candidate. Between his federal loss in 1945 and his provincial victory in 1952, he served on the school-board in his hometown of Danville, later becoming the chairman.

== Member of the National Assembly ==
Lafrance was elected to the National Assembly in the 1952 Quebec election as a member for Richmond. As a member of the opposition during Maurice Duplessis' time as Premier, he served as the party's deputy whip, and later its chief whip.

When Jean Lesage led the Liberal Party to victory in the 1960 election, Lafrance became Minister of Social Welfare, and later Minister of Family and Welfare in the Lesage Government.

Lafrance played an interesting role in the politics of marijuana and other drugs in Quebec. During debate on the creation of OPTAT (the Office of Prevention and Treatment of Alcoholism and the other Toxicomanias), Lafrance relied on research of the day to suggest that alcoholism was a disease, rather than a vice, like some of his other colleagues suggested. Additionally, Lafrance suggested that not only was drug use and alcoholism not specifically a problem with school-age children, but was instead indicative of larger social problems within the community.

Lafrance did not run in the 1970 election, and was replaced by Yvon Brochu.

== Later life ==
After his retirement from the National Assembly, Lafrance continued to be involved in the community, serving on the Asbestos Regional School Board (Commission scolaire de l'Asbesterie) until 1976, and was an active member in the Knights of Columbus, the local chamber of commerce, and the Société Saint-Jean-Baptiste.

Lafrance received an honorary doctorate in social sciences from Université de Sherbrooke in 1962.

Émilien Lafrance died on October 21, 1977, near Lac Memphrémagog. He was buried in Danville, in the cemetery of Saint-Anne's Parish.

== Post life Merits and honours ==
He was inducted into the Danville select club, 3rd edit, on October 20, 2016.
