= Compton—Frontenac =

Former federal electoral district in Quebec, Canada

Quebec electoral district

Defunct federal electoral district
- Legislature: House of Commons
- District created: 1947; 78 years ago
- District abolished: 1966; 59 years ago
- First contested: 1949
- Last contested: 1965

Compton—Frontenac was a federal electoral district in Quebec, Canada, that was represented in the House of Commons of Canada from 1949 to 1968.

== History ==
This riding was created in 1947 from parts of Compton, Mégantic—Frontenac and Stanstead ridings.

It consisted of:

- the county of Compton and the towns of Cookshire, East Angus and Scotstown;
- in the county of Sherbrooke, the municipality of Compton and the villages of Compton and Waterville;
- in the county of Frontenac, the municipalities of Chesham, Ditchfield and Spaulding, Gayhurst, Gayhurst South-East, Marston South, St-Augustin-de-Woburn, Ste. Cécile-de-Whitton, St-Hubert-de-Spaulding, St. Léon-de-Marston, St. Sébastien, Winslow North, Winslow South, the village of St. Sébastien and the town of Mégantic; and
- in the county of Stanstead, the municipality and the village of St. Herménégilde.

It was abolished in 1966 when it was redistributed into Compton and Beauce ridings.

== Members of Parliament ==
This riding elected the following members of Parliament:

Parliament	Years	Member	Party
Compton—Frontenac; Riding created from Compton, Mégantic—Frontenac and Stanstead
21st	1949–1953	Joseph-Adéodat Blanchette	Liberal
22nd	1953–1957	Joseph-Adéodat Blanchette	Liberal
23rd	1957–1958	Joseph-Adéodat Blanchette	Liberal
24th	1958–1962	George Stearns	Progressive Conservative
25th	1962–1963	Henry Latulippe	Social Credit
26th	1963–1963	Henry Latulippe	Social Credit
26th	1963–1965	Henry Latulippe	Ralliement créditiste
27th	1965–1968	Henry Latulippe	Ralliement créditiste
Riding dissolved into Compton and Beauce

== Election results ==
1949 Canadian federal election
Party	Candidate	Votes
Liberal	Joseph-Adéodat Blanchette	10,764
Progressive Conservative	Alden-Raymond Rousseau	5,327
Union des électeurs	Rosaire Lafrenière	1,555

1953 Canadian federal election
Party	Candidate	Votes
Liberal	Joseph-Adéodat Blanchette	10,365
Progressive Conservative	Philippe A., Brulotte	6,530
Co-operative Commonwealth	J.E., Jamieson	261

1957 Canadian federal election
Party	Candidate	Votes
Liberal	Joseph-Adéodat Blanchette	9,328
Progressive Conservative	George Mac Stearns	8,270
Co-operative Commonwealth	Curtis Henry, Lowry	340

1958 Canadian federal election
Party	Candidate	Votes
Progressive Conservative	George Mac Stearns	9,383
Liberal	J.-A. Blanchette	8,349
Co-operative Commonwealth	Curtis Henry Lowry	331

1962 Canadian federal election
Party	Candidate	Votes
Social Credit	Henry Latulippe	8,184
Progressive Conservative	Bill Clifford	4,657
Liberal	Gérard Lacourciere	4,379

1963 Canadian federal election
Party	Candidate	Votes
Social Credit	Henry Latulippe	6,234
Liberal	Cecil W. Dougherty	5,673
Progressive Conservative	Estelle Gobeil	3,471
New Democratic	Curtis Lowry	445

1965 Canadian federal election
Party	Candidate	Votes
Ralliement créditiste	Henry Latulippe	7,240
Liberal	Cecil Dougherty	4,464
Progressive Conservative	Robert Fournier	2,128
New Democratic	Curtis Lowry	1,196

== See also ==
- List of Canadian electoral districts
- Historical federal electoral districts of Canada
