= Matthew Henry Cochrane =

Canadian politician (1823–1903)

The Hon. Matthew Henry Cochrane
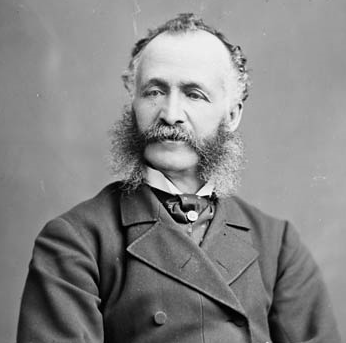

Senator for Wellington, Quebec
- In office October 17, 1872 – August 12, 1903
- Appointed by: John A. Macdonald
- Preceded by: John Sewell Sanborn
- Succeeded by: William Mitchell

Personal details
- Born: November 11, 1823 Compton, Lower Canada
- Died: August 12, 1903 (aged 79) Compton, Quebec
- Party: Conservative

Matthew Henry Cochrane (November 11, 1823 – August 12, 1903) was a Canadian industrialist, livestock breeder, and politician.

Born in Compton, Lower Canada, the eldest son of an Irish Anglican immigrant, James Cochrane, Cochrane was a cattle importer and breeder. He was appointed to the Senate on the advice of John Alexander Macdonald in October 1872 representing the senatorial division of Wellington, Quebec. A Conservative, he served almost 31 years until his death in 1903. His 1,100-acre (4.5 km^{2}) ranch in Compton was one of the most well known in Canada and his annual auctions attracted ranches from all across North America and England. He was one of the founders of the Eastern Townships Bank and Cochrane Ranch in Alberta was one of the largest in the British Empire.

Cochrane, Alberta is named in his honour.

== See also ==
- List of Bishop's College School alumni
