= Jacob Nicol =

Canadian politician (1876-1958)

The Hon. Jacob Nicol
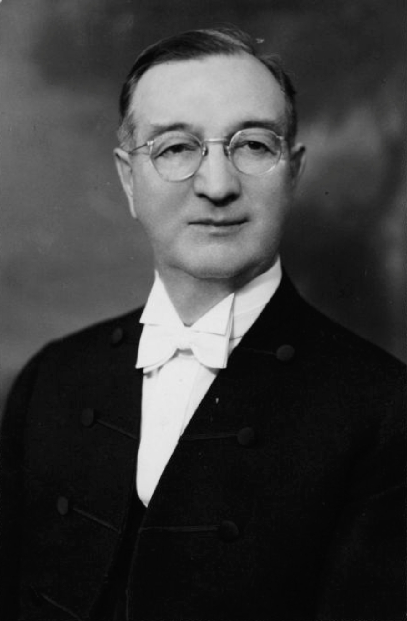

Senator for Bedford, Quebec
- In office July 14, 1944 – September 23, 1958
- Appointed by: William Lyon Mackenzie King
- Preceded by: Rufus Henry Pope
- Succeeded by: Louis-Philippe Beaubien

Member of the Legislative Council of Quebec for Bedford
- In office September 16, 1929 – September 23, 1958
- Appointed by: Louis-Alexandre Taschereau
- Preceded by: Joseph-Jean-Baptiste Gosselin
- Succeeded by: Joseph-Oscar Gilbert

MLA for Compton
- In office 1923–1929
- Preceded by: Camille-Émile Desjarlais
- Succeeded by: Andrew Ross McMaster

MLA for Richmond
- In office 1921–1923
- Preceded by: Walter George Mitchell
- Succeeded by: Georges-Ervé Denault

Personal details
- Born: April 25, 1876 Roxton Pond, Quebec
- Died: September 23, 1958 (aged 82) Sherbrooke, Quebec
- Party: Liberal
- Other political affiliations: Quebec Liberal Party
- Relations: Michel Auger, uncle
- Cabinet: Minister Without Portfolio (1934-1936); Minister of Municipal Affairs (1921-1924); Provincial Treasurer (1921-1929)

Jacob Nicol, QC (April 25, 1876 – September 23, 1958) was a Canadian lawyer, newspaper publisher, and politician. He became Senator under Prime Minister of Canada, William Lyon Mackenzie King.

== Early life ==
Born in Roxton Pond, Quebec, the son of Philip Nicol, farmer and tool manufacturer, and Sophie Cloutier, Nicol was educated at Feller College, McMaster University, and Université Laval à Québec. He studied law with Henry Thomas Duffy and Louis-Alexandre Taschereau. He was called to the Quebec Bar in 1904 and was created a King's Counsel in 1912.

== Law career ==
He practiced law in Sherbrooke, Quebec with Wilfrid Lazure and Silfrid Couture until 1935. From 1906 to 1921, he was a crown attorney for the District of St. Francis. From 1921 to 1931, he was a member the Board of Education of the Province of Quebec.

== Newspaper owner ==
In 1910, he was one of the founders of the newspaper La Tribune in Sherbrooke, where he remained an owner until 1955. He was also an owner of the Le Soleil in Quebec City from 1927 to 1948, L'Événement in 1936, L'Événement-Journal from 1938 to 1948, and Le Nouvelliste de Trois-Rivières until 1951. He also an owner of radio stations CHLN and CHLT. From 1945 to 1955, he was a director and vice-president at the National Bank of Canada.

== Political career ==
He was acclaimed to the Legislative Assembly of Quebec for the district of Richmond in a 1921 by-election. A Quebec Liberal, he was re-elected in Compton in 1923 and 1927. He was a Minister of Municipal Affairs in the cabinet of Louis-Alexandre Taschereau from 1921 to 1924. He was the Provincial Treasurer from 1921 to 1929. In 1929, he was appointed to the Legislative Council of Quebec for the division of Bedford. He was speaker from 1930 to 1934 and leader of the government from 1934 to 1936. In 1934, he was a minister without portfolio in the cabinet of Taschereau. In 1944, he was summoned to the Senate of Canada for the division of Bedford on the advice of William Lyon Mackenzie King. He held both posts until his death.

== Honours ==
He received honorary Doctor of Laws degrees from Bishop's College in 1927, McMaster University in 1928, and Laval University in 1952. He was made a Knight of the Légion d'honneur in 1948.

He died in Sherbrooke in 1958.
