= André Bachand (Progressive Conservative MP) =

Canadian politician (born 1961)

Member of the National Assembly of Quebec for Richmond
- In office October 1, 2018 – August 27, 2026
- Preceded by: Karine Vallières
- Succeeded by: Bernard Sévigny

Member of the Canadian Parliament for Richmond—Arthabaska
- In office June 2, 1997 – June 28, 2004
- Preceded by: Riding established
- Succeeded by: André Bellavance

Mayor of Asbestos
- In office 1986–1997

Personal details
- Born: December 8, 1961 (age 64) Quebec City, Quebec, Canada
- Party: CAQ
- Other political affiliations: Conservative; Progressive Conservative (1997–2003)
- Occupation: Administrator; business executive

André Bachand (born December 8, 1961) is a Canadian politician who represented the riding of Richmond—Arthabaska as member of the Progressive Conservatives from 1997 to 2003. In 2018, he was elected as a member of the National Assembly of Quebec for Richmond as a member of the Coalition Avenir Québec.

When the PC Party was merged with the Canadian Alliance into the Conservative Party in December 2003, Bachand declined to join the CPC and sat as an "Independent Progressive Conservative" until the 2004 election, when he retired from the House of Commons.

== Early life and career ==
Born in Quebec City, Quebec, Bachand has been an administrator, and a business executive. He was the mayor of Asbestos, Quebec, from 1986 to 1997, and was the Préfet of the MRC d'Asbestos from 1987 to 1997.

== Federal politics ==
=== Young Turk ===
Bachand was first elected as a member of the Progressive Conservative Party in 1997, one of five PC MPs elected that year in Quebec. Bachand was one of a handful of new "Young Turk" PC MPs (along with Scott Brison, John Herron and Peter MacKay) who were considered the future youthful leadership material that would restore the ailing Tories to their glory days. In 1998, Jean Charest stepped down as federal Progressive Conservative leader to move to Quebec provincial politics, becoming leader of the federalist Quebec Liberal Party (unaffiliated with the Liberal Party of Canada). Bachand was one of many who unsuccessfully tried to convince Charest to remain in federal politics for at least one more election. Former Prime Minister Joe Clark succeeded Charest as leader of the PC Party and Bachand was supportive of Clark's candidacy.

=== Difficult times ===
The Quebec-wing of the federal PC parliamentary caucus wrestled with several internal policy issues in the late 1990s after Charest's departure, including with respect to bilingualism policies and the autonomy of provinces relative to the federal government. Shortly after Joe Clark was elected leader of the federal Tory Party, Minister of Intergovernmental Affairs Stéphane Dion brought forward the Clarity Act on behalf of the government. The Clarity Act detailed specifically how the province of Quebec could separate and under what conditions a separation could be legal. Clark and seven other PC MPs chose to support Bachand and the Quebec PC MPs in opposing the Clarity Act, while the remaining PC MPs voted in favour of the Bill regardless of Clark's stance.

=== Quebec lieutenant ===
By 1999, Bachand had emerged as the nominal Quebec lieutenant of the Conservatives, attending most PC events in the province with Clark and acting as the party's chief spokesman for Quebec issues. Bachand was also the chief responder to the multiple defections of Quebec Tory party officials, MPs, and senators to the Liberal Party and Canadian Alliance during this period. In September 2000, three Quebec PC MPs, fearful of their re-election prospects under Clark's leadership, crossed the floor shortly before the federal election to sit as Liberal MPs, leaving Bachand as the only remaining PC MP in Quebec. He was subsequently re-elected in the 2000 election, as were all three of the MPs who crossed the floor. Twelve Tory MPs won election in 2000, just enough for the party to retain official party status.

=== Deputy leader ===
In February 2003, Bachand announced his candidacy for the leadership of the Progressive Conservatives. However, on May 12, he announced that he was dropping out of the race and supporting Peter MacKay. Bachand had been running fifth in the race, and had failed to gather support among party delegates and to raise enough money for his campaign. After MacKay's victory, Bachand briefly served as Deputy Leader of the Progressive Conservatives until early December 2003. Before becoming deputy leader, Bachand served as the deputy house leader of the Progressive Conservative Party, as well as its critic for the Intergovernmental Affairs, Industry, Science Research and Development, and the Deputy Prime Minister portfolios.

=== Lone independent ===
When the party merged with the Canadian Alliance at the end of 2003, Bachand announced that he would retire from politics. Bachand did not sit with the new Conservative Party of Canada Caucus, and became an independent MP until the June 2004 election. During the June 2004 election, Bachand endorsed the Liberal candidate in the Richmond—Arthabaska race over the Conservative and Bloc Québécois challengers. In the event, the BQ won fifty-four of Quebec's seventy-five seats, including Richmond—Arthabaska, where André Bellavance won.

Bachand's departure from federal politics has been lamented by many Tories hailing from Quebec. In a Maclean's article covering the March 2005 founding policy convention of the new Conservative Party, Senator Pierre Claude Nolin mused that if Bachand had remained elected and participatory in the new party, he may served as the new Conservative Party's chief Quebec lieutenant as part of Stephen Harper's attempts to woo Quebec voters.

=== Return to politics ===
In September 2008, Bachand announced that he would be the Conservative Party candidate for the district of Sherbrooke in the 40th Canadian feneral election. On election night, Bachand's comeback attempt was unsuccessful. He lost to Bloc Québécois incumbent Serge Cardin, finishing third with 16.4% of the vote.

Shortly after his election defeat, Bachand accepted an appointment from Harper as Canada's ambassador to UNESCO in Paris. As ambassador, Bachand's most high-profile activity was to oppose, on the Canadian government's behalf, the entry of the Palestinian Authority to membership in the organization.

In October 2011, Harper appointed Bachand as his senior advisor on Quebec issues. The post, which previously had been combined with responsibility for being Harper's communications advisor, was reportedly separated from other responsibilities in order to make space for Bachand.

In 2013, Maclean's included Bachand as one of the thirteen members of Harper's "inner circle," of most-trusted advisors, tasked "to try to improve Conservative fortunes in Quebec."

In September 2013, Bachand was hired by the Earnscliffe Strategy Group, an Ottawa public-affairs firm.

== Provincial politics ==
Bachand ran for the Coalition Avenir Québec in the riding of Richmond, going on to win in the 2018 provincial election. On February 2, 2026, he announced that he would not be running for re-election in the 2026 provincial election.

== Electoral record ==
=== Provincial ===
2022 Quebec general election: Richmond
Party	Candidate	Votes	%	±%
Coalition Avenir Québec	André Bachand	21,255	46.75	+7.11
Québec solidaire	Philippe Pagé	9,031	19.86	+0.96
Conservative	Marylaine Bélair	6,683	14.70	+13.40
Parti Québécois	Jacinthe Caron	5,803	12.76	-5.08
Liberal	Mona Louis-Jean	2,476	5.45	-14.36
Démocratie directe	Richard Magnan	112	0.25	–
Independent	Raymond de Martin	105	0.23	–
Total valid votes		45,465	98.64	–
Total rejected ballots		625	1.36	–
Turnout		46,090	72.10	
Electors on the lists		63,923		

2018 Quebec general election: Richmond
Party	Candidate	Votes	%	±%
Coalition Avenir Québec	André Bachand	17,011	39.64	+17.60
Liberal	Annie Godbout	8,502	19.81	-21.35
Québec solidaire	Colombe Landry	8,110	18.90	+12.11
Parti Québécois	Véronique Vigneault	7,654	17.84	-9.76
Green	Yves La Madeleine	680	1.58	+0.23
Conservative	Karl Brousseau	600	1.40	+0.90
Citoyens au pouvoir	Déitane Gendron	353	0.82	
Total valid votes		42,910	98.36	
Total rejected ballots		716	1.64	
Turnout		43,626	72.11	
Eligible voters		60,502		
Coalition Avenir Québec gain from Liberal		Swing		+19.475
Source(s) "Rapport des résultats officiels du scrutin". Élections Québec.

=== Federal ===
==== Sherbrooke ====
2008 Canadian federal election
Party	Candidate	Votes	%	±%	Expenditures
Bloc Québécois	Serge Cardin	25,502	50.1%	-2.2%	$63,527
Liberal	Nathalie Goguen	9,947	19.5%	+6.4%	$12,688
Conservative	André Bachand	8,331	16.4%	-4.3%	$46,261
New Democratic	Yves Mondoux	6,676	13.1%	+4.2%	$11,460
Rhinoceros	Sébastien Côrriveau	467	0.9%	–	$180
Total valid votes/Expense limit		50,923	100.0%	$86,493	
Total rejected ballots		607	1.2%		
Turnout		51,530	62.9%		

==== Richmond—Arthabaska ====
2000 Canadian federal election
Party	Candidate	Votes	%	±%
Progressive Conservative	André Bachand	18,430	37.2	-4.3
Bloc Québécois	André Bellavance	18,067	36.5	-0.5
Liberal	Aldéi Beaudoin	10,416	21.0	+0.7
Alliance	Philippe Ardilliez	1,930	3.9	
Natural Law	Christian Simard	375	0.8	
New Democratic	Vincent Bernier	319	0.6	-0.6
Total valid votes		49,537	100.0	

1997 Canadian federal election
Party	Candidate	Votes	%
Progressive Conservative	André Bachand	21,687	41.5
Bloc Québécois	Gaston Leroux	19,319	37.0
Liberal	Aldéi Beaudoin	10,613	20.3
New Democratic	Martin Bergeron	641	1.2
Total valid votes		52,260	100.0
