= Aylmer Byron Hunt =

Canadian politician

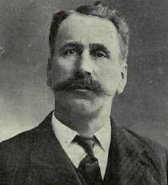

Member of the Canadian Parliament for Compton
- In office 1904–1911
- Preceded by: Rufus Henry Pope
- Succeeded by: Frederick Robert Cromwell
- In office 1917–1925
- Preceded by: Frederick Robert Cromwell
- Succeeded by: Joseph Étienne Letellier de Saint-Just

Personal details
- Born: April 26, 1864 Bury, Canada East
- Died: May 4, 1925 (aged 61)
- Party: Liberal

Aylmer Byron Hunt (April 26, 1864 – May 4, 1925) was a Canadian politician.

Born in Bury, Canada East, the son of James Hunt and Jane Stokes, Hunt was educated at the Bury Model School. He was by occupation a trader and lumber merchant. He unsuccessfully contested Compton as the Liberal Party of Quebec candidate for the Legislative Assembly of Quebec in the general elections of 1900. He was first elected to the House of Commons of Canada for Compton in the general elections of 1904. He was unseated on petition but elected again in the by-election that followed. He was re-elected in 1908 but was defeated in 1911. A Liberal, he was elected again in 1917 and 1921.

1908 Canadian federal election: Compton
Party	Candidate	Votes
Liberal	Aylmer Byron Hunt	3,175
Conservative	Rufus Henry Pope	2,781

1911 Canadian federal election: Compton
Party	Candidate	Votes
Conservative	Frederick Robert Cromwell	2,953
Liberal	Aylmer Byron Hunt	2,877

1917 Canadian federal election: Compton
Party	Candidate	Votes
Opposition (Laurier Liberals)	Aylmer Byron Hunt	4,418
Government (Unionist)	Kenneth Nicholson McIver	2,515

1921 Canadian federal election: Compton
Party	Candidate	Votes
Liberal	Aylmer Byron Hunt	7,866
Conservative	Frederick Robert Cromwell	3,961
