= Claude Tessier =

Canadian politician

Member of the Canadian Parliament for Compton (renamed to Mégantic—Compton—Stanstead in 1978)
- In office 1974–1979
- Preceded by: Henry Latulippe
- Succeeded by: François Gérin

Personal details
- Born: 8 February 1943 Sainte-Thècle, Quebec
- Died: 8 November 2010 (aged 67)
- Party: Liberal

Claude Tessier (8 February 1943 – 8 November 2010) was a Liberal party member of the House of Commons of Canada. He was a professor and administrator by career.

Born in Sainte-Thècle, Quebec, Tessier represented the Quebec riding of Compton, later known as Mégantic—Compton—Stanstead. Following an unsuccessful attempt to gain the riding in the 1972 federal election, he defeated the Social Credit incumbent Henry Latulippe in the 1974 election. Tessier was re-elected in 1979 and 1980, but lost to François Gérin of the Progressive Conservative party in the 1984 election. Tessier served three successive terms from the 30th to 32nd Canadian Parliaments.

== electoral record ==
1979 Canadian federal election: Mégantic—Compton—Stanstead
Party	Candidate	Votes
Liberal	Claude Tessier	19,309
Social Credit	Henry Latulippe	9,047
Progressive Conservative	Claude G. Gosselin	7,463
New Democratic	Murray Dale Powell	1,316
Union populaire	Robert Huberdeau	281

1980 Canadian federal election: Mégantic—Compton—Stanstead
Party	Candidate	Votes
Liberal	Claude Tessier	21,562
Progressive Conservative	Fernand Grenier	10,336
Social Credit	Léonel Drouin	3,023
New Democratic	Keith Taylor	1,769
Rhinoceros	D. Gavroche Gosselin	1,002
lop.parl.ca

1984 Canadian federal election: Mégantic—Compton—Stanstead
Party	Candidate	Votes
Progressive Conservative	François Gérin	25,679
Liberal	Claude Tessier	13,123
New Democratic	Jean-Pierre Walsh	2,690
Green	Andrew McCammon	454
Parti nationaliste	Michel Houde	427
Social Credit	Robert Bélanger	399
Commonwealth of Canada	Ronald A. Javitch	51
