= L'Événement-Journal =

L'Événement-Journal was a daily Canadian newspaper in Quebec City, Quebec. It was founded by Hector Fabre in 1867 with the name L'Événement. Fabre sold the paper in 1883. In 1936 it was purchased by Jacob Nicol, the owner of Le Soleil. In 1938 the paper merged with Le Journal to become L'Événement-Journal. The paper's last publication was on 3 March 1967.
