= Henry Latulippe =

Canadian politician (1913–1995)

Henry P. Latulippe
- Official 1973 portrait

Member of Parliament for Compton—Frontenac
- In office June 1962 – June 1968

Member of Parliament for Compton
- In office June 1968 – May 1974

Personal details
- Born: 23 April 1913 Saint-Victor, Quebec, Canada
- Died: 26 October 1995 (aged 82) Sherbrooke, Quebec, Canada
- Party: Social Credit; Social Credit
- Profession: industrialist, merchant

Henry P. Latulippe (23 April 1913 – 26 October 1995) was a Canadian businessmane and politician. Latulippe served as a Social Credit party and Ralliement créditiste member of the House of Commons of Canada. He was an industrialist and merchant by career.

He was first elected at the Compton—Frontenac riding in the 1962 general election and was re-elected there in the 1963 and 1965 federal elections. From 1963 to 1971, he was a member under the Ralliement créditiste.

Electoral district restructuring in 1966 restored the Compton riding where Latulippe was re-elected for further terms in Parliament in 1968 and 1972. He was defeated there in the 1974 federal election by Claude Tessier of the Liberal party. Latulippe was unsuccessful in unseating Tessier in the 1979 election, when the riding became known as Mégantic—Compton—Stanstead.

== Electoral history ==
1968 Canadian federal election: Compton
Party	Candidate	Votes
Ralliement créditiste	Henry Latulippe	11,961
Liberal	Léger Cameron	8,615
Progressive Conservative	Luc Bourque	3,987
New Democratic	Curtis Lowry	851

1972 Canadian federal election: Compton
Party	Candidate	Votes
Social Credit	Henry Latulippe	11,636
Liberal	Claude Tessier	10,656
Progressive Conservative	Guy-C. Gauvin	4,142
New Democratic	Duncan J. M. Graham	612
Independent	Conrad Descoteaux	182

1974 Canadian federal election: Compton
Party	Candidate	Votes
Liberal	Claude Tessier	11,474
Social Credit	Henry Latulippe	9,917
Progressive Conservative	Guy Lapointe	4,407
New Democratic	Duncan J. M. Graham	858
lop.parl.ca

1979 Canadian federal election: Mégantic—Compton—Stanstead
Party	Candidate	Votes
Liberal	Claude Tessier	19,309
Social Credit	Henry Latulippe	9,047
Progressive Conservative	Claude G. Gosselin	7,463
New Democratic	Murray Dale Powell	1,316
Union populaire	Robert Huberdeau	281
