= Yvon Vallières =

Canadian politician and teacher (born 1949)

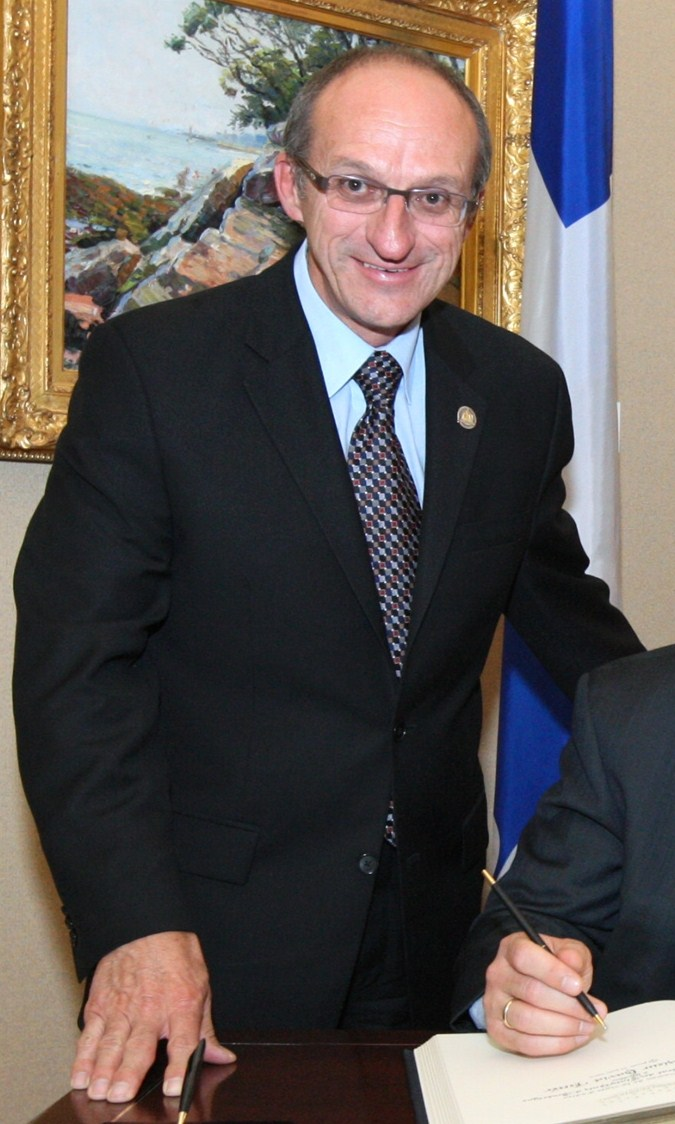
- Vallières in 2010

44th President of the National Assembly
- In office January 13, 2009 – April 5, 2011
- Preceded by: François Gendron
- Succeeded by: Jacques Chagnon

Member of the National Assembly of Quebec for Richmond
- In office April 13, 1981 – September 4, 2012
- Preceded by: Yvon Brochu
- Succeeded by: Karine Vallières
- In office October 29, 1973 – November 15, 1976
- Preceded by: Yvon Brochu
- Succeeded by: Yvon Brochu

Personal details
- Born: February 5, 1949 (age 76) Richmond, Quebec, Canada
- Political party: Quebec Liberal
- Children: Karine Vallières
- Profession: Teacher

Yvon Vallières (French pronunciation: [ivɔ̃ valjɛʁ]; born February 5, 1949) is a retired Canadian politician and teacher. He was a member of National Assembly of Quebec for the riding of Richmond in the Estrie region from 1973 to 1976 and from 1981 to 2012. Formerly the Minister of Agriculture, Fisheries and Food from 2003 to 2007, he is the current chair of the Government Caucus. He was a member of the Quebec Liberal Party.

== Education ==
Vallières went to the Université de Sherbrooke and obtained a bachelor's degree in pedagogy and would teach at several schools from 1970 to 1972 and from 1976 to 1981 while being a councilor at the Commission Scolaire de Taillon in 1972. He also obtained a certificate in psychology human relations.

== Professional and political career ==
Vallières would become the MNA for Richmond in 1973 when Robert Bourassa won a second majority term. Vaillieres was however defeated by the Parti Québécois in 1976 when they gain power for the first time ever under the leadership of René Lévesque. After returning to his teaching duties from 1976 to 1981, Vallières was a candidate again in Richmond for the 1981 elections and was re-elected. He was then named the President of the Agriculture, Fisheries and Food Parliamentary Commission. He was re-elected again in 1985 as the Liberals returned to power when Robert Bourassa returned to politics and became once again the party leader. Vallières would be named the Chief Whip of the government for the full mandate.

During his next mandate from 1989 to 1994, he was the Minister responsible or the delegate minister for several portfolios. He was named the Delegate Minister of Transport in 1989 and Delegate Minister of Regional development, Agriculture, Fisheries and Food from 1990 to 1992. He was also the Minister responsible of Fisheries from 1990 to 1994. When Daniel Johnson, Jr. replaced Bourassa during the final months of the Liberal Mandate, Vallieres was named once again the chief Whip of the government.

While the Liberals lost power in 1994, Vallières was re-elected for a fifth mandate and was named the opposition's critic in agriculture and regional development and was for the second time the President of the Agriculture, Fisheries and Food Parliamentary Commission. In 1998, he was re-elected for a sixth mandate and was again the opposition critic in agriculture until 2000. He was also the President of the Territorial Planning Parliamentary Commission.

When the Liberals regained power in 2003, Vallières, who won a seventh mandate was named for the third time the Chief Government Whip. After a Cabinet shuffle in 2005, he was named the Minister of Agriculture, Fisheries and Food until the 2007 elections. However, during his mandate, health issues forced him to take some time off and Laurent Lessard took over temporarily his duties. He was also briefly the Minister responsible of the Centre-du-Québec region after a minor Cabinet shuffle in 2006. Vallières won an eighth mandate but was removed from the Cabinet and named the Chair of the government Caucus.

On January 13, 2009, to April 2011, he was the president of the National Assembly of Quebec.

== Electoral record (incomplete) ==
1989 Quebec general election: Richmond
Party	Candidate	Votes	%
Liberal	Yvon Vallières (incumbent)	16,578	68.77
Parti Québécois	Richard Arsenault	6,259	25.96
Green	Jack Kugelmass	555	2.30
Unity	Thelma Westman	506	2.10
Parti 51	Michel Dostie	210	0.87
Total valid votes		24,108	-
Rejected and declined votes		473	-
Turnout		24,581	79.80
Electors on the lists		30,804	-
Source: Official Results, Le Directeur général des élections du Québec.

National Assembly of Quebec
Preceded by Francois Gendron	President of the National Assembly of Quebec; 2009-2011	Succeeded by Jacques Chagnon
Political offices
Preceded by Françoise Gauthier (Liberal)	Minister of Agriculture, Fisheries and Food; 2005–2007	Succeeded by Laurent Lessard (Liberal)
Preceded by Hugette Lachapelle	Chief Whip of the Quebec Liberal Party (1st time); 1985–1989	Succeeded by William Cusano
Preceded by William Cusano	Chief Whip of the Quebec Liberal Party (2nd time); 1994	Succeeded by
Preceded by	Chief Whip of the Quebec Liberal Party (3rd time); 2003–2005	Succeeded by Norman Macmillan
