= Albert Goudreau =

Canadian politician

Member of the Legislative Assembly of Quebec for Richmond
- In office 1935–1939
- Preceded by: Stanislas-Edmond Desmarais
- Succeeded by: Stanislas-Edmond Desmarais
- In office 1944–1952
- Preceded by: Stanislas-Edmond Desmarais
- Succeeded by: Émilien Lafrance

Personal details
- Born: February 4, 1887 Wotton, Quebec
- Died: October 12, 1962 (aged 75) Sherbrooke, Quebec
- Party: Union Nationale

Albert Goudreau (February 4, 1887 – October 12, 1962) was a Canadian politician and a four-term Member of the Legislative Assembly of Quebec.

== Background ==
He was born in Wotton, Eastern Townships on February 4, 1887.

== City Councillor ==
Goudreau served as a city councillor in the township of Windsor from 1916 to 1918 and in the city of Asbestos from 1933 to 1944.

== Member of the legislature ==
Goudreau ran as a Conservative candidate in the provincial district of Richmond in the 1935 election and won against Liberal incumbent Stanislas-Edmond Desmarais.

He joined Maurice Duplessis's Union Nationale and was re-elected in the 1936 election, but was defeated in the 1939 election.

He was re-elected in the 1944 and the 1948 elections, but was defeated by Liberal candidate Émilien Lafrance in the 1952 election.

== Mayor ==
He served as Mayor of Asbestos from 1945 to 1950.

== Death ==
He died on October 12, 1962, in Sherbrooke.
