= François Gérin =

Canadian politician

Member of Parliament for Mégantic—Compton—Stanstead
- In office September 4, 1984 – October 24, 1993
- Preceded by: Claude Tessier
- Succeeded by: Maurice Bernier

Personal details
- Born: 3 August 1944 Coaticook, Quebec, Canada
- Died: 3 April 2005 (aged 60)
- Party: Progressive Conservative (1984–1990); Independent (1990–1991); Bloc Québécois (1991–1993)
- Profession: Lawyer

François Gérin (3 August 1944 – 3 April 2005) was a member of the House of Commons of Canada. He was a lawyer by career.

Gérin was born in Coaticook, Quebec.

He represented the Quebec riding of Mégantic—Compton—Stanstead where he was first elected in the 1984 federal election under the Progressive Conservative party. He was re-elected in 1988, therefore becoming a member in the 33rd and 34th Canadian Parliaments.

However, he left the Progressive Conservative party on 5 May 1990 and became independent until he formally became a founding member of the Bloc Québécois in September 1991. In 1993, Gérin left federal politics and did not seek a third term in the House of Commons.

== Electoral record ==
1984 Canadian federal election: Mégantic—Compton—Stanstead
Party	Candidate	Votes
Progressive Conservative	François Gérin	25,679
Liberal	Claude Tessier	13,123
New Democratic	Jean-Pierre Walsh	2,690
Green	Andrew McCammon	454
Parti nationaliste	Michel Houde	427
Social Credit	Robert Bélanger	399
Commonwealth of Canada	Ronald A. Javitch	51

1988 Canadian federal election: Mégantic—Compton—Stanstead
Party	Candidate	Votes
Progressive Conservative	François Gérin	23,246
Liberal	Jean-Guy Landry	11,566
New Democratic	Jean-Pierre Walsh	3,195
Social Credit	Yvan Lanctot	550
