= William Mitchell (Canadian politician) =

Canadian politician

The Hon. William Mitchell
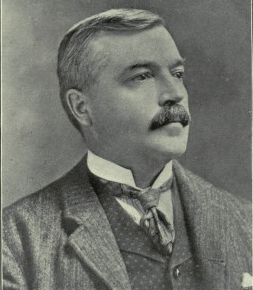

Senator for Wellington, Quebec
- In office March 5, 1904 – May 10, 1926
- Appointed by: Wilfrid Laurier
- Preceded by: Matthew Henry Cochrane
- Succeeded by: Wilfrid Laurier McDougald

Personal details
- Born: March 14, 1851 Durham Township, Canada West
- Died: May 10, 1926 (aged 75)
- Party: Liberal
- Children: Walter George Mitchell

William Mitchell (March 14, 1851 – May 10, 1926) was a Canadian politician.

Born in Durham Township, Canada West, the son of Thomas Mitchell and Margaret Patrick, both from the north of Ireland, Mitchell started working for a railway company in Maine. He moved back to Durham where he worked in the lumber business. He later moved to Drummondville, Quebec, where he also worked in the lumber business. He was appointed to the Senate of Canada in 1904 by Wilfrid Laurier. He sat as a Liberal and served until his death in 1926.

His son, Walter George Mitchell, was also a politician.
