= Maurice Bernier =

Canadian politician (born 1947)

Member of the Canadian Parliament for Mégantic—Compton—Stanstead
- In office 1993–1997
- Preceded by: François Gérin
- Succeeded by: District was abolished in 1996

Personal details
- Born: 11 March 1947 (age 79) Lac-Mégantic, Quebec, Canada
- Party: Bloc Québécois

Maurice Bernier (born 11 March 1947) was a member of the House of Commons of Canada from 1993 to 1997. His career has been in government and administration.

Born in Lac-Mégantic, Quebec, Bernier was elected in the Mégantic—Compton—Stanstead electoral district under the Bloc Québécois party in the 1993 federal election, thus he served in the 35th Canadian Parliament.

He left Canadian politics after losing to Liberal David Price at the restructured Compton—Stanstead riding in the 1997 federal election.

1993 Canadian federal election: Mégantic—Compton—Stanstead
Party	Candidate	Votes
Bloc Québécois	Maurice Bernier	17,317
Liberal	Eugene Naylor	13,538
Progressive Conservative	Gilles Goddard	6,042
Natural Law	Jacqueline Benoît	767
New Democratic	Martine Simard	495
Abolitionist	Marco Bissonnette	215
National	James Stewart	198
