= Frederick Robert Cromwell =

Canadian politician

Member of the Canadian Parliament for Compton
- In office 1911–1917
- Preceded by: Aylmer Byron Hunt
- Succeeded by: Aylmer Byron Hunt

Personal details
- Born: May 13, 1872 Leeds, Megantic County, Quebec
- Died: October 16, 1950 (aged 78)
- Party: Conservative

Frederick Robert Cromwell (May 13, 1872 – October 16, 1950) was a Canadian politician in the province of Quebec.

Born in Leeds, Megantic County, Quebec, the son of Thomas and Elizabeth (Kinnear) Cromwell, Cromwell was educated at public schools. He was mayor of Clinton, Quebec in 1902, a councilor in Eaton, Quebec in 1907, and a councilor in Cooksville, Quebec from 1909 to 1912. A farmer and manager, he was elected to the House of Commons of Canada for the electoral district of Compton in the 1911 federal election. A Conservative, he did not run in 1917 but was defeated when he ran again in 1921.

1911 Canadian federal election: Compton
Party	Candidate	Votes
Conservative	Frederick Robert Cromwell	2,953
Liberal	Aylmer Byron Hunt	2,877

1921 Canadian federal election: Compton
Party	Candidate	Votes
Liberal	Aylmer Byron Hunt	7,866
Conservative	Frederick Robert Cromwell	3,961
