= Ulverton, Quebec =

Ulverton
- Municipality
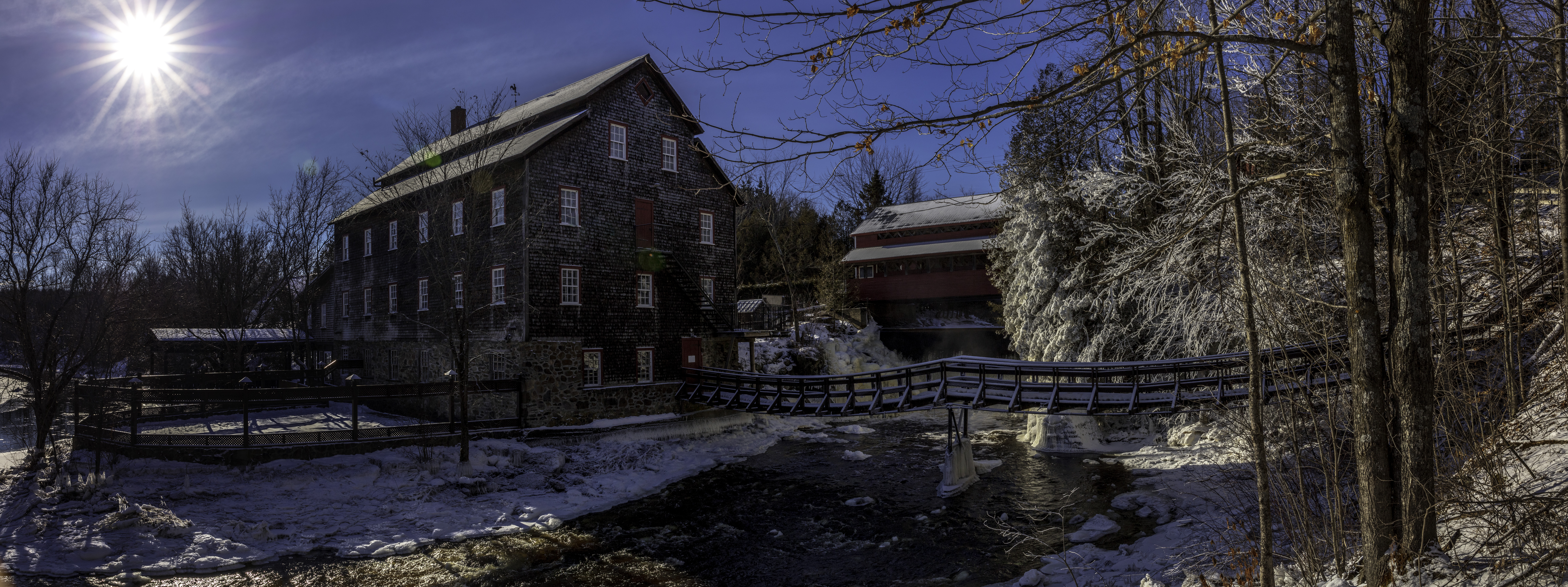

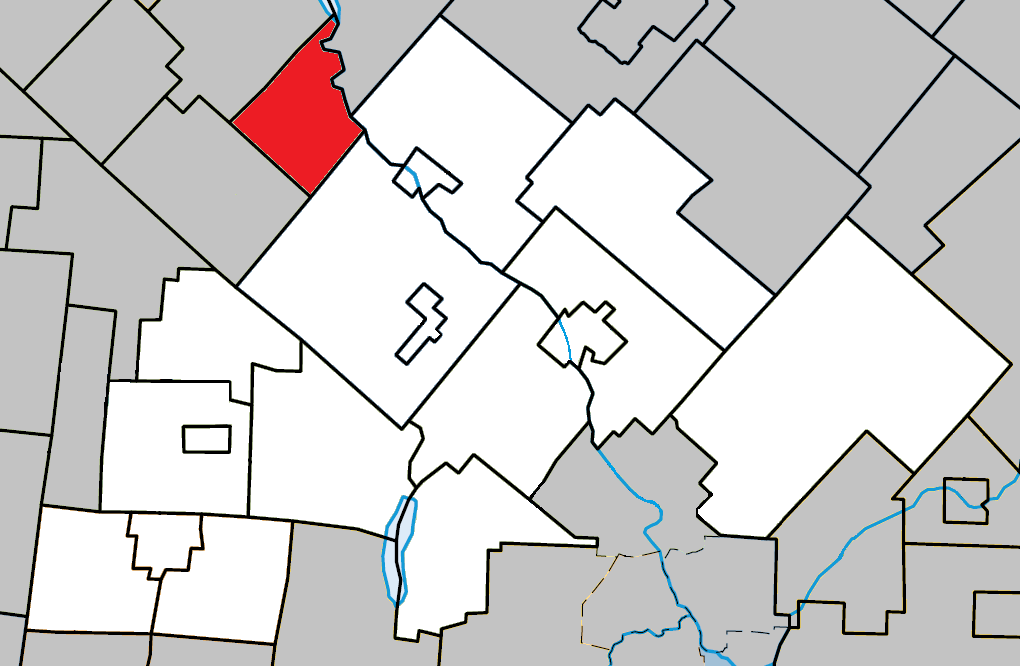
- Location within Le Val-Saint-François RCM

- Location in southern Quebec
- Coordinates: 45°43′N 72°14′W
- Country: Canada
- Province: Quebec
- Region: Estrie
- RCM: Le Val-Saint-François
- Constituted: July 1, 1855

Government
  - Mayor: Lynda Tétreault
  - Federal riding: Richmond—Arthabaska—des-Sources
  - Prov. riding: Richmond

Area
  - Total: 52.40 km^{2} (20.23 sq mi)
  - Land: 51.01 km^{2} (19.70 sq mi)

Population (2011)
  - Total: 416
  - Density: 8.2/km^{2} (21/sq mi)
  - Pop 2006-2011: ▲14.6%
  - Dwellings: 210
- Time zone: UTC−5 (EST)
  - Summer (DST): UTC−4 (EDT)
- Postal code(s): J0B 2B0
- Area code: 819
- Highways A-55: R-116; R-143
- Website: www.municipaliteulverton.com

Ulverton is a municipality in Le Val-Saint-François Regional County Municipality in the Estrie region of Quebec, Canada.

Prior to December 15, 1999, it was in Drummond Regional County Municipality in the Centre-du-Québec region.

== Demographics ==
=== Population ===
Historical Census Data - Ulverton, Quebec
Year	Pop.	±%
1991	299	—
1996	304	+1.7%
2001	357	+17.4%
2006	363	+1.7%
2011	416	+14.6%

=== Language ===
Mother tongue (2011)

Language	Population	Pct (%)
French only	330	79.5%
English only	70	16.9%
English and French	5	1.2%
Non-official languages	10	2.4%

== See also ==
- List of anglophone communities in Quebec
- List of municipalities in Quebec
