= Richmond, Quebec =

Richmond
- Town
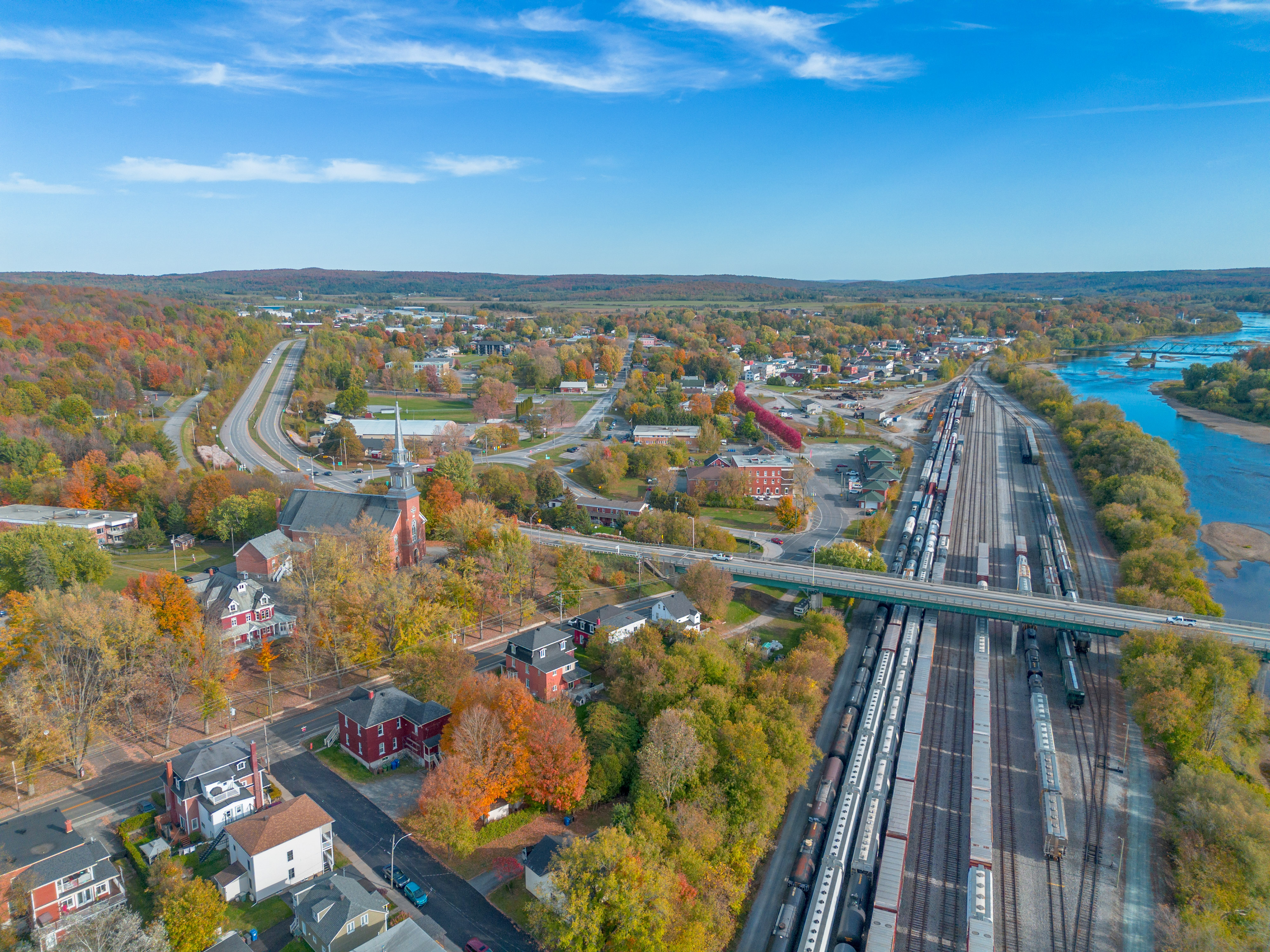
- Richmond in 2025

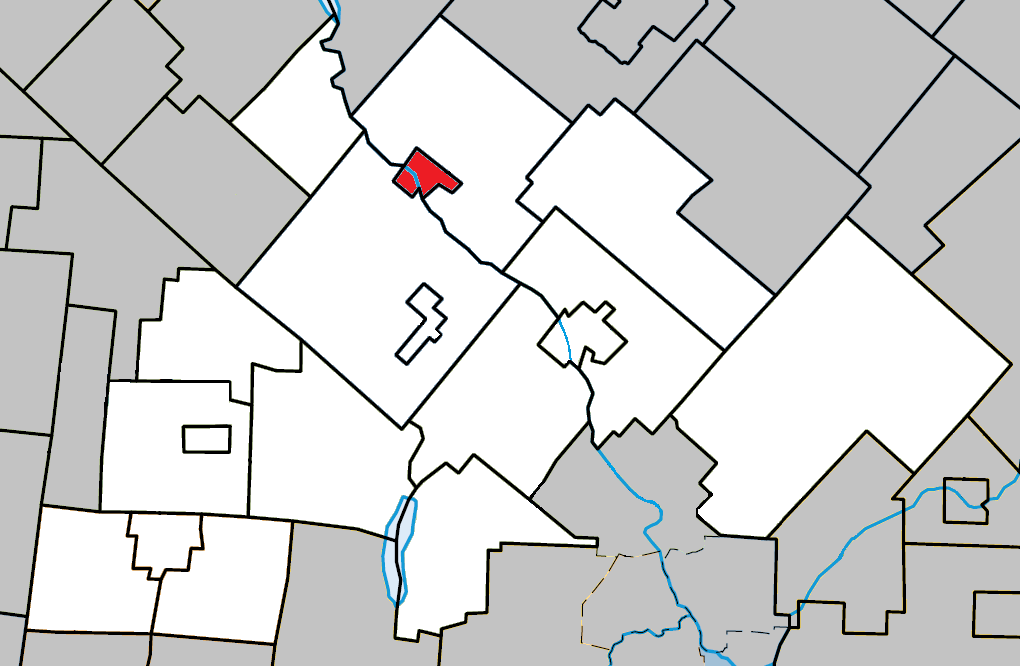
- Location within Le Val-Saint-François RCM.

- Location in southern Quebec.
- Coordinates: 45°40′N 72°09′W
- Country: Canada
- Province: Quebec
- Region: Estrie
- RCM: Le Val-Saint-François
- Constituted: December 29, 1999

Government
  - Mayor: Kevin Stoddard
  - Federal riding: Richmond—Arthabaska—des-Sources
  - Prov. riding: Richmond

Area
  - Total: 6.90 km^{2} (2.66 sq mi)
  - Land: 7.12 km^{2} (2.75 sq mi)
- There is an apparent contradiction between two authoritative sources

Population (2016)
  - Total: 3,232
  - Density: 460.2/km^{2} (1,192/sq mi)
  - Pop 2006-2011: ▼1.8%
  - Dwellings: 1,616
- Time zone: UTC−5 (EST)
  - Summer (DST): UTC−4 (EDT)
- Postal code(s): J0B 2H0
- Area code: 819
- Highways: R-116; R-143; R-243
- Website: www.ville.richmond.qc.ca

Richmond, population 3,232 (2016) [citation needed], is a town nestled amidst rolling farmlands on the Saint-François River between Sherbrooke and Drummondville, in the heart of Estrie in Quebec, Canada.

== History ==
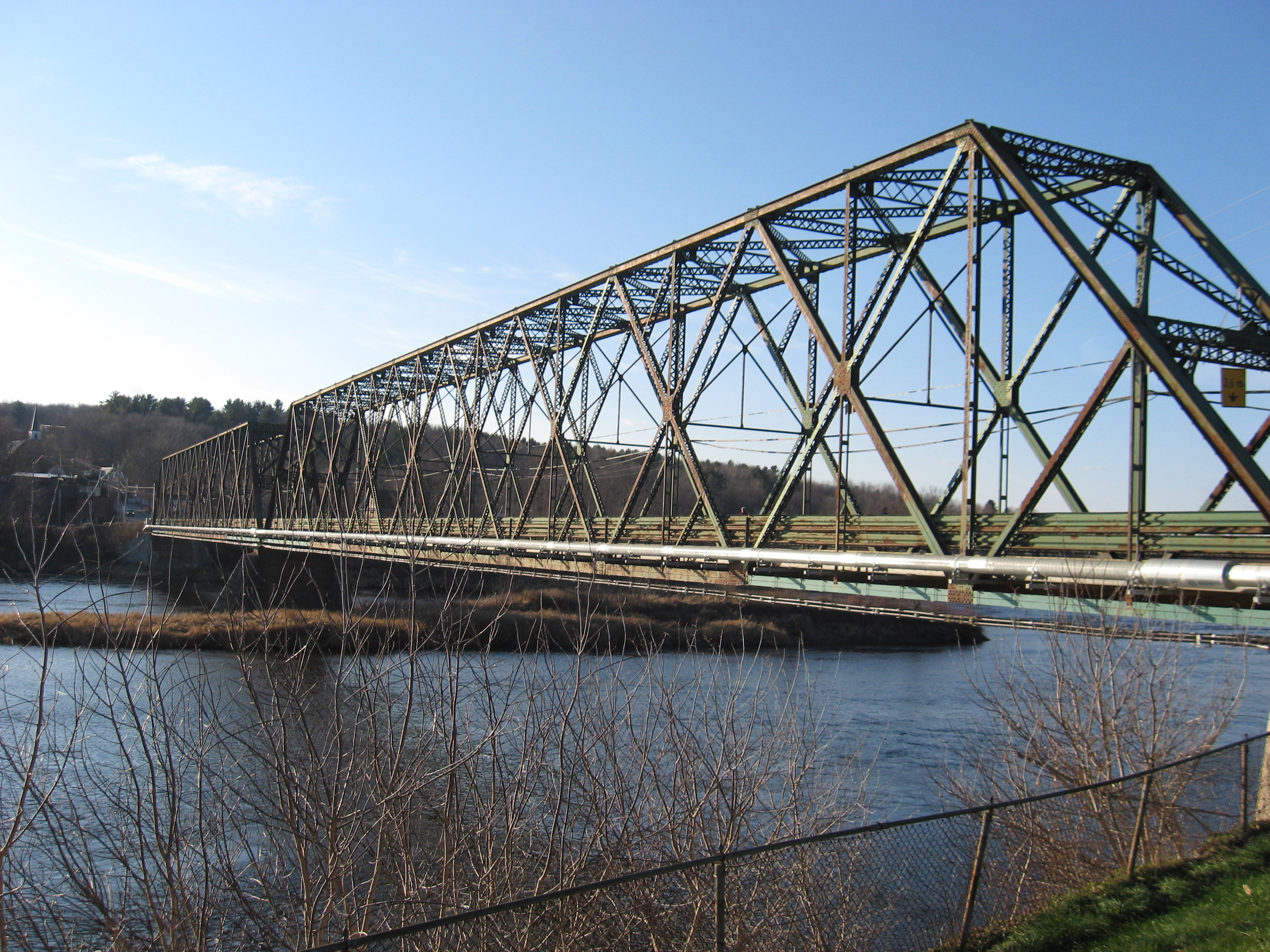
The Mackenzie Bridge linking Richmond and Melbourne.

Originally settled by colonists from New England, Montreal and the Richelieu River valley circa 1798, Richmond is one of the oldest settlements in the former region of the Eastern Townships. The clay loam soils of the town and its surrounding area were found to be suitable for agriculture, especially dairying.

Richmond grew in importance during the 1800s when it became a key railway junction. The St. Lawrence and Atlantic Railroad opened between Montreal and Portland, Maine, on April 4, 1853 and was purchased four months later and absorbed into the Grand Trunk Railway (GTR)'s system. Two years later, the GTR opened a line from the mainline in Richmond northeast to Lévis to connect Montreal with Quebec City. The line was eventually extended further east to Rivière-du-Loup and a connection with the Intercolonial Railway, which operated trains on the GTR through Richmond to Montreal until 1897.

The town itself was first called Richmond in 1820, when a post office was inaugurated. By the 1860s Richmond was an important centre, with a college, literary institute and a public library.

Richmond's importance has waned since the 1930s, however, as the railways have also come to play a lesser role in the economy. The GTR was absorbed into the Canadian National Railways (CNR) and the line to Levis was abandoned in favour of more direct lines from Montreal to Quebec City. In 1989, CNR sold the entire railway line from Montreal to Portland, via Richmond, to a short line operator.

=== Richmond today ===
Richmond as it exists today was created on December 29, 1999 following the merger of the "old" town of Richmond on the right bank of the Saint-François and the village of Melbourne, located on the other side.

=== Origin of the name Richmond ===
The name Richmond is in memory of Charles Lennox, 4th Duke of Richmond and Lennox (1764–1819), Governor General of Upper Canada from 1818 to 1819.

=== Origin of the name Melbourne ===
The origin of the name Melbourne is uncertain, but the village is believed to have been named for Melbourne, Derbyshire or Melbourne, Hampshire.

== Climate ==
Richmond has a humid continental climate typical of southern Quebec. Precipitation is high year-round, resulting in warm to hot, humid summers and cold, snowy winters. There is a significant temperature difference between seasons as typical of the North American interior, with 25.8 °C (78.4 °F) as July high and −4.9 °C (23.2 °F) as the high for January.

Climate data for Richmond
Month	Jan	Feb	Mar	Apr	May	Jun	Jul	Aug	Sep	Oct	Nov	Dec	Year
Record high °C (°F)	17.0 (62.6)	17.5 (63.5)	25.0 (77.0)	30.6 (87.1)	32.2 (90.0)	35.0 (95.0)	37.2 (99.0)	36.1 (97.0)	33.9 (93.0)	29.4 (84.9)	23.9 (75.0)	18.9 (66.0)	37.2 (99.0)
Mean daily maximum °C (°F)	−4.9 (23.2)	−2.7 (27.1)	2.9 (37.2)	11.4 (52.5)	18.6 (65.5)	23.2 (73.8)	25.8 (78.4)	24.4 (75.9)	19.4 (66.9)	12.6 (54.7)	5.3 (41.5)	−1.7 (28.9)	11.2 (52.2)
Daily mean °C (°F)	−10.3 (13.5)	−8.7 (16.3)	−2.8 (27.0)	5.7 (42.3)	12.2 (54.0)	16.9 (62.4)	19.7 (67.5)	18.4 (65.1)	13.6 (56.5)	7.4 (45.3)	1.3 (34.3)	−6.4 (20.5)	5.6 (42.1)
Mean daily minimum °C (°F)	−15.8 (3.6)	−14.6 (5.7)	−8.5 (16.7)	0.0 (32.0)	5.7 (42.3)	10.6 (51.1)	13.5 (56.3)	12.4 (54.3)	7.8 (46.0)	2.2 (36.0)	−2.8 (27.0)	−11.0 (12.2)	−0.1 (31.8)
Record low °C (°F)	−44.4 (−47.9)	−43.9 (−47.0)	−40.0 (−40.0)	−20.6 (−5.1)	−6.7 (19.9)	−3.9 (25.0)	0.6 (33.1)	−1.1 (30.0)	−8.9 (16.0)	−11.1 (12.0)	−26.7 (−16.1)	−44.4 (−47.9)	−44.4 (−47.9)
Average precipitation mm (inches)	60.8 (2.39)	54.4 (2.14)	62.2 (2.45)	74.6 (2.94)	93.2 (3.67)	96.8 (3.81)	107.4 (4.23)	120.7 (4.75)	84.2 (3.31)	86.2 (3.39)	80.6 (3.17)	71.5 (2.81)	992.6 (39.08)
Average snowfall cm (inches)	45 (18)	39.5 (15.6)	29.7 (11.7)	10 (3.9)	0 (0)	0 (0)	0 (0)	0 (0)	0 (0)	1.1 (0.4)	15.5 (6.1)	43.1 (17.0)	184 (72)

== Demographics ==
Historical Census Data - Richmond, Quebec
Year	Pop.	±%
1991	3,123	—
1996	3,053	−2.2%
1999A	3,584	+17.4%
2001	3,424	−4.5%
2006	3,336	−2.6%
2011	3,275	−1.8%
(A) adjusted figure due to amalgamation of the village of Melbourne and the town of Richmond on December 29, 1999.

In the 2021 Census of Population conducted by Statistics Canada, Richmond had a population of 3,259 living in 1,609 of its 1,720 total private dwellings, a change of 0.8% from its 2016 population of 3,232. With a land area of 6.98 km^{2} (2.69 sq mi), it had a population density of 466.9/km^{2} (1,209.3/sq mi) in 2021.

Mother tongue (2011)

Language	Population	Pct (%)
French only	2,370	73.7%
English only	745	23.2%
English and French	60	1.7%
Non-official languages	35	1.1%
English and non-official language	5	0.2%

== Notable residents ==
- Joseph Bédard (October 23, 1835 – May 4, 1912), merchant and political figure in Quebec.
- William Henry Jeffrey, named after the Jeffrey Mine in Asbestos.
- Sylvain Lefebvre (born October 14, 1967), former ice hockey defenceman who played on five National Hockey League teams from 1989 to 2003
- Walter George Mitchell (May 30, 1877 – April 3, 1935), Canadian lawyer and politician.
- Peter Samuel George Mackenzie (1862–1914), lawyer and politician, Minister of Finance in the government of Quebec
- Mack Sennett, Hollywood director/pioneer
- Yvon Vallières, politician and teacher
- Paul Ignatieff June 30/July 12, 1870 – August 12, 1945) was an Imperial Russian politician who served as Education Minister for Tsar Nicholas II.

== Particularities ==
- The reverse side of the 1954-series Canadian $2 bill featured a view of the village of Melbourne.
- Richmond plays host to the second largest St. Patrick's Day Parade in the province of Quebec, behind only Montreal.

== See also ==
- List of anglophone communities in Quebec
- List of cities in Quebec
