= Fernand Grenier =

Fernand Grenier may refer to:

- Fernand Grenier (Canadian politician) (1927–1988)
- Fernand Grenier (French politician) (1901–1992)
