= George Stearns (politician) =

Canadian politician

George McClellan (Mac) Stearns

Member of Parliament for Compton—Frontenac
- In office March 1958 – June 1962

Personal details
- Born: 17 December 1901 Lac-Mégantic, Quebec, Canada
- Died: 9 January 1979 (aged 77) Lac-Mégantic, Quebec, Canada
- Party: Progressive Conservative
- Profession: Industrialist

George McClellan (Mac) Stearns (17 December 1901 – 9 January 1979) was a Progressive Conservative party member of the House of Commons of Canada. He was an industrialist by profession, having founded and operated the Mégantic Pulp & Paper Company.

Stearns was born in the small rural town of Lac-Mégantic, Quebec. He and his wife had three children. After his death, ownership of his Mégantic-area pulp and paper company was passed down to them. After an unsuccessful attempt to win the Compton—Frontenac riding in the 1957 federal election, he was elected in the 1958 election. He served one term in the 24th Canadian Parliament before leaving federal office and did not campaign for re-election in 1962.

Stearns died in 1979 at the age of 77 in Lac Megantic.
