= Danville, Quebec =

Danville
- City
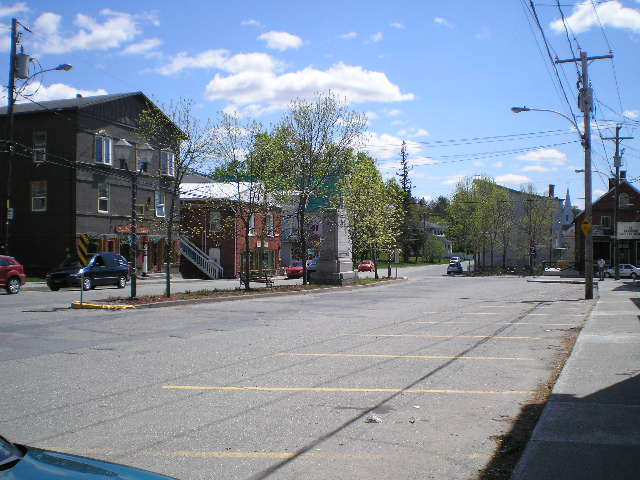
- Downtown Danville

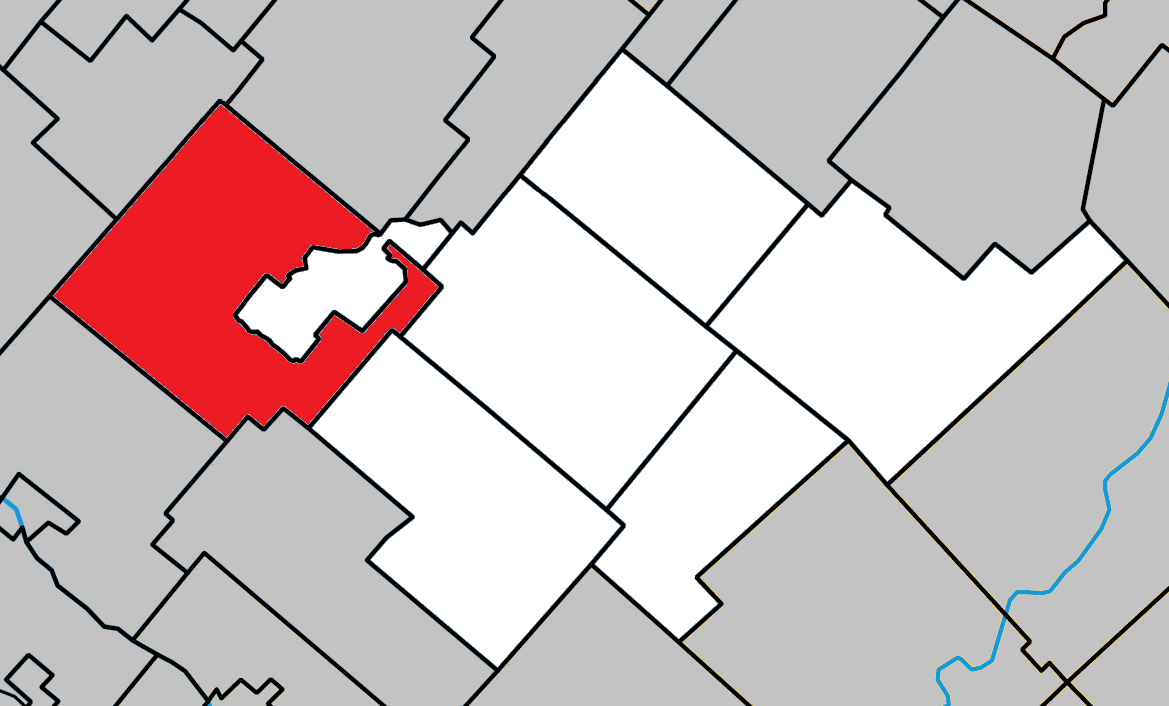
- Location within Les Sources RCM.

- Location in southern Quebec.
- Coordinates: 45°47′N 72°01′W
- Country: Canada
- Province: Quebec
- Region: Estrie
- RCM: Les Sources
- Settled: 1783
- Constituted: January 1, 1860

Government
  - Mayor: Martine Satre
  - Federal riding: Richmond—Arthabaska—des-Sources
  - Prov. riding: Mégantic

Area
  - City: 153.60 km^{2} (59.31 sq mi)
  - Land: 151.73 km^{2} (58.58 sq mi)

Population (2021)
  - City: 3,888
  - Density: 25.2/km^{2} (65/sq mi)
  - Urban: 1,652
  - Pop 2016-2021: ▲1.6%
  - Dwellings: 1,878
- Time zone: UTC−5 (EST)
  - Summer (DST): UTC−4 (EDT)
- Postal code(s): J0A 1A0
- Area code: 819
- Highways: R-116; R-249; R-255
- Website: www.villededanville.com

Danville is a city in the administrative region of Estrie, in the Canadian province of Quebec. As of the 2021 Canadian Census, the population was 3,888.

== History ==
Danville is on a stretch of Chemin Craig, a road built in the 19th century connecting Quebec to New England. The town is about 70 miles (110 km) north of the Vermont border. Loyalists from New England began arriving in 1783 and gave the town its name in memory of their hometown in Vermont of the same name: Danville, Vermont. The founder of Danville was Simeon Flint, a resident from Danville, Vermont.

Until about 1971, the population of Danville was mostly anglophone. However, in the mid-1970s, many of the younger generation migrated to English Canada, Greater Montreal, or New England.

There are many heritage buildings, including three Protestant churches (Christian Adventist, Presbyterian, and United Church of Canada), two Anglican churches, an Evangelical Baptist church and a Roman Catholic church. The Presbyterian church has been retrofitted into a four-star restaurant, and the Christian Advent church has been a private residence since 2007, following its closing in 2006. The Catholic church was erected in 2003, following the 2001 loss by fire of the earlier church erected in 1891. The current United church was completed in 1875 for a Congregational parish and is the oldest church in the town. One of the two Anglican Church of England churches is located on a historic site on the countryside, near the border of the Shipton Township, Denison Mills.

Danville has two primary schools: a French language school, École Masson, and an English-speaking school, known as ADS (Asbestos-Shipton-Danville).

In the centre is a square formed by the enlargement of an intersection. A memorial for soldiers killed in the First World War, the Second World War, and the Korea War is in the centre of the square. Another memorial, to Private Timothy O'Hea, a recipient of the Victoria Cross, is erected in front of the former City Hall.

Once a busy town inhabited by workers of the nearby Johns Manville asbestos mine, the town has calmed down considerably since the mine's closing. A magnesium smelter, Magnola, part of Noranda, using mine tailings from local asbestos mine, was set up in the town for a short time, but it ended up closing because of increasing foreign competition. The bucolic rolling fields in the area are good for farming, with many farms having been around for over a century. Both dairy and beef cattle are raised in the area although other livestock are also common.

Each year, the town has an art symposium in which artists from the area gather in the town's many churches and display their artwork.

== Demographics ==
In the 2021 Census of Population conducted by Statistics Canada, Danville had a population of 3,888 living in 1,778 of its 1,878 total private dwellings, a change of 1.6% from its 2016 population of 3,826. With a land area of 151.73 km^{2} (58.58 sq mi), it had a population density of 25.6/km^{2} (66.4/sq mi) in 2021.

== Notable people ==
- Kate Campbell Hurd-Mead - born here. Feminist, suffragist, and obstetrician.
- Daniel Johnson, Sr - Premier of Quebec from 1966 until his death in 1968
- Mack Sennett - born here. Hollywood filmmaker. First to give a film job to Charlie Chaplin.
- Émilien Lafrance (September 6, 1911 – October 21, 1977) was a local politician
- Rev.Joseph Homer Parker (1848-1915), Congregational minister and founder of Fairmount College (now Wichita State University) and Kingfisher College, now memorialized as the Kingfisher College Chair of the Philosophy of Ethics and Religion at the University of Oklahoma.
