= Peter Samuel George Mackenzie =

Canadian politician (1862–1914)

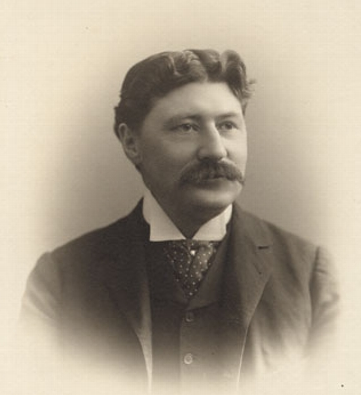

Peter Samuel George Mackenzie (19 December 1862 – 1 November 1914) was a Canadian lawyer and politician.

Born at Cumberland House, in the Hudson's Bay Company territories, Mackenzie was the son of Jane and Roderick Mackenzie. His father, a cousin of the explorer Sir Alexander Mackenzie, was an agent of the company. He was educated at Upper Canada College, Toronto, the High School of Montreal, the St. Francis College at Richmond, and McGill University Faculty of Law at Montreal graduating with a BCL, then articled in Montreal to Melbourne Tait and John Joseph Caldwell Abbott, the second of whom later became Prime Minister of Canada.

On 4 February 1884 Mackenzie was called to the bar of Quebec and opened his own office at Richmond, later going into partnership with Henry Aylmer, who had been a member of the House of Commons from 1874 to 1878, and with Auguste-Maurice Tessier. Later he practised alone again, and was appointed King's Counsel on 30 June 1903.

At the 1900 Quebec general election, Mackenzie was elected to the Legislative Assembly of Quebec as a Liberal member for Richmond and was re-elected unopposed in 1904 and 1908. In January 1910 his seat fell vacant when he was appointed as Treasurer in the Lomer Gouin cabinet, but he was again elected unopposed at the by-election of January 1910 and in the general election of 1912.

He was a member of the governing body of Bishop's College and in 1906 joined the Protestant Committee of the Council of Public Instruction.

Mackenzie died in office at Melbourne, Richmond, on 1 November 1914, aged 51, and was buried in St Ann's Cemetery, Richmond, three days later. He left a widow, who had previously been Mrs Penfold.

== Honours ==
- Honorary degree of Doctor of Civil Laws from Bishop's College, 1910
