= List of people from Sherbrooke =

The following is a list of people from Sherbrooke, Quebec.

== A ==
- Douglas Abbott
- George Oscar Alcorn
- Maurice Allard
- Edmund Tobin Asselin
- Patrick Tobin Asselin
- Josée Auclair

== B ==
- John W. H. Bassett, started his career as media baron as co-owner of the Sherbrooke Record
- Matt Beaudoin
- Philippe Beaudry
- Éric Bélanger, NHL hockey player for the Edmonton Oilers
- Claude Bertrand
- Conrad Black, started his career as media baron as co-owner of the Sherbrooke Record
- Steven Blaney
- Pierre-Hugues Boisvenu
- Joseph-Armand Bombardier, hailed from the Sherbrooke area
- Louise Bombardier, actress and writer
- François Bouchard
- Pierre-Marc Bouchard, NHL hockey player for the Minnesota Wild
- John Samuel Bourque
- Kim Boutin
- Robert A. Boyd
- Stéphane Brochu
- Edward Towle Brooks
- Samuel Brooks
- Alexis Bwenge

== C ==
- Serge Cardin, former Bloc Québécois MP for Sherbrooke
- Jacques Chapdelaine
- Jean Charest, federal cabinet minister, Deputy Prime Minister and Progressive Conservative Party leader; Quebec Liberal Party leader and Premier of Quebec
- Dan Chicoine
- Joseph-Armand Choquette
- Jim Corcoran, singer-songwriter
- Marc-André Craig

== D ==
- Sylvie Daigle
- Éric Dandenault
- Mathieu Dandenault, former NHL ice hockey player for the Montreal Canadiens and Detroit Red Wings
- Robert Davidson
- Delaf
- Jayson Dénommée
- Sonia Denoncourt
- Paul Desruisseaux
- Pierre DesRuisseaux
- Rita Dionne-Marsolais
- Christian Dubé, ice hockey player for SC Bern
- Gilles Dubé
- Norm Dubé
- Pierre-Luc Dusseault, former NDP MP for Sherbrooke (2011-2019); youngest MP in Canadian history

== E ==
- William Henry Pferinger Elkins, commandant of the Royal Military College of Canada (1930-1935); commander of Atlantic Command (1940-1943)

== F ==
- Carole Facal
- Reginald Fessenden
- Yves Forest
- Northrop Frye, literary critic

== G ==
- Garou, singer
- André Gaudette
- Antoine Gélinas-Beaulieu
- Marc Gervais, Jesuit and film professor
- Paul Mullins Gervais
- Sam Giguère
- Maurice Gingues
- Susan Goyette

== H ==
- Archibald C. Hart
- Bill Heindl Jr.
- I. F. Hellmuth
- William Heneker, commander of the 8th Infantry Division in the First World War

== J ==
- Guy Jodoin

== K ==
- Yousuf Karsh, photographer

== L ==
- Jean-François Labbé
- Sarah Lassez
- Diane Lemieux
- Francis Lemieux
- André Lussier

== M ==
- Olivier Magnan
- Serge Malenfant
- Sean Patrick Maloney
- Annie Martin
- Allan McIver
- Gord McRae
- Jean-Luc Mongrain

== N ==
- Frédéric Niemeyer

== O ==
- Joseph Gilles Napoléon Ouellet
- Guy Ouellette

== P ==
- Pascal-Pierre Paillé
- Marc Parenteau
- Donald Patriquin
- Yanic Perreault, former NHL ice hockey player
- David Perron, NHL hockey player for the Detroit Red Wings
- Jacinthe Pineau
- Gerry Plamondon
- Arch Presby
- David Price

== R ==
- Bobby Rivard
- Stéphane Robidas, NHL hockey player for the Dallas Stars
- Alfred Rouleau
- Claude Ruel

== S ==
- Harry Saltzman, film producer
- Eric Saucke-Lacelle
- Christian Savoie, winner of Canada's Strongest Man; entrant to the World's Strongest Man competition
- Reed Scowen
- Hollis Smith
- Ralph M. Steinman, immunologist, 2011 Nobel Prize in Medicine

== T ==
- Marion Thénault
- Guy Tousignant
- Maryse Turcotte
- Mathieu Turcotte

== V ==
- Sarah Vaillancourt
- Magdeleine Vallieres, 2001, racing cycliste
- Vincent Vallières

== W ==
- Jimmy Waite
- Stéphane Waite
- Edson Warner
- Norman Webster
