= James Patrick Mullins =

Canadian politician

Member of Parliament for Richmond—Wolfe
- In office October 1935 – April 1949
- Preceded by: François-Joseph Laflèche
- Succeeded by: Ernest-Omer Gingras

Personal details
- Born: James Patrick Mullins; 5 January 1874 Saint-Mathias, Quebec, Canada
- Died: 26 November 1965 (aged 91)
- Party: Liberal
- Spouse(s): Lillian Flynn m. 26 May 1903
- Profession: insurance agent

James Patrick Mullins (5 January 1874 – 26 November 1965) was a Liberal party member of the House of Commons of Canada and served as mayor of Bromptonville at one time. He was born in Saint-Mathias, Quebec and became an insurance agent by career.

He was first elected to Parliament at the Richmond—Wolfe riding in the 1935 general election and re-elected in 1940 and 1945. He did not stand for re-election in 1949.
