= Sherbrooke County (Province of Canada electoral district) =

Electoral district in former Province of Canada

Sherbrooke County Canada East
Province of Canada electoral district

Defunct pre-Confederation electoral district
- Legislature: Legislative Assembly of the Province of Canada
- District created: 1841
- District abolished: 1867
- First contested: 1841
- Last contested: 1863

Sherbrooke County was an electoral district of the Legislative Assembly of the Parliament of the Province of Canada, in Canada East. It was located in the Eastern Townships, based on the rural areas around the town of Sherbrooke. The town was a separate electoral district, also named Sherbrooke.

Sherbrooke County electoral district was created in 1841, based on the previous electoral district of the same name for the Legislative Assembly of Lower Canada, and was represented by one member in the Legislative Assembly. It was abolished in 1853, and replaced by two new districts, a new Sherbrooke County and a new Wolfe County, which jointly sent one member to the Assembly. The new district was re-named Richmond and Wolfe in 1855.

== Boundaries ==
Sherbrooke County electoral district was located in the Eastern Townships (now the Estrie administrative region). The town of Sherbrooke was the major centre, but was not part of the Sherbrooke County electoral district. The town was a separate electoral district, also named Sherbrooke. Sherbrooke County was largely rural, and extended from the town of Sherbrooke south to the border with the United States.

The Union Act, 1840 merged the two provinces of Upper Canada and Lower Canada into the Province of Canada, with a single Parliament. The separate parliaments of Lower Canada and Upper Canada were abolished. The Union Act provided that the pre-existing electoral boundaries of Lower Canada and Upper Canada would continue to be used in the new Parliament, unless altered by the Union Act itself.

The Lower Canada electoral district of Sherbrooke County was not altered by the Act. It was therefore continued with the same boundaries in the new Parliament. Those boundaries had been set by a statute of Lower Canada in 1829:

The County of Sherbrooke shall contain the Townships of Garthby, Hatford, Whitton, Marston, Clinton, Woburn, Stanhope, Croydon, Chesham, Adstock, Lingwick, Weedon, Dudswell, Bury, Hampden, Ditton, Emberton, Drayton, Auckland, Newport, Westbury, Stoke, Ascot, Eaton, Hereford, Compton, Clifton, Windsor, Brompton, Shipton, Melbourne and Orford, together with all gores or augmentations of the said Townships.

== Members of the Legislative Assembly (1841–1854) ==
Sherbrooke County was a single-member constituency, which was in existence from 1841 to 1854.

The following were the members of the Legislative Assembly for Sherbrooke County. The party affiliations are based on the biographies of individual members given by the National Assembly of Quebec, as well as votes in the Legislative Assembly. "Party" was a fluid concept, especially during the early years of the Province of Canada.

Parliament	Members	Years in Office	Party
1st Parliament; 1841–1844	John Moore	1841–1844	Unionist; Tory (1841–1842) "British" Tory (1843)
2nd Parliament; 1844–1847	Samuel Brooks	1844–1847	"British" Tory
3rd Parliament; 1848–1851	Samuel Brooks (Note: Died in office, March 22, 1849: Côté, Political Appointments and Elections in the Province of Canada, 1841 to 1860, p. 61, note (117).)	1848–1849	"British" Tory
3rd Parliament; 1848–1851	Alexander Tilloch Galt (Note: Elected in by-election, April 17, 1849: Côté, Political Appointments and Elections in the Province of Canada, 1841 to 1860, p. 61, note (118).) (Note: Resigned seat, January 10, 1850: "Biography of Alexander Tilloch Galt". Dictionnaire des parlementaires du Québec de 1792 à nos jours (in French). National Assembly of Quebec.)	1849–1850	Moderate Independent
3rd Parliament; 1848–1851	John Sewell Sanborn (Note: Elected in by-election, March 9, 1850: Côté, Political Appointments and Elections in the Province of Canada, 1841 to 1860, p. 61, note (119).)	1850–1851	Liberal Independent
4th Parliament; 1851–1854	John Sewell Sanborn	1851–1854	Liberal Independent

== Abolition ==
The district was abolished in 1853, to take effect at the next general elections in 1854. It was replaced by a new Sherbrooke County and a new Wolfe County, which jointly elected one member. Sherbrooke County was re-named Richmond County in 1855. The united counties of Richmond and Wolfe continued in existence until Confederation in 1867.

== See also ==
- List of elections in the Province of Canada
