= André Bernier =

André Bernier may refer to:

- André Bernier (meteorologist) (born 1959), American meteorologist
- André Bernier (politician) (1930–2012), former Canadian politician and accountant
