= William Hoste Webb =

Canadian politician

Member of the Canadian Parliament for Richmond—Wolfe
- In office 1867–1874
- Succeeded by: Henry Aylmer

Member of the Legislative Council of Quebec for Wellington
- In office 1875–1887
- Preceded by: Edward Hale
- Succeeded by: Francis Edward Gilman

Personal details
- Born: 24 November 1820 Hampshire, England
- Died: 19 December 1890 (aged 70) Sherbrooke, Quebec, Canada

William Hoste Webb, QC (24 November 1820 – 19 December 1890) was a Quebec lawyer and political figure. He represented Richmond—Wolfe in the House of Commons of Canada as a Conservative member from 1867 to 1874.

He was born in Hampshire, England in 1820. He studied at the Royal Naval School in London and came to Brompton Township in Lower Canada with his family in 1836. Webb articled in law in Montreal and was called to the bar in 1850. He served as warden for Melbourne and Richmond townships from 1855 to 1857 and from 1879 to 1883. He also served as mayor of Melbourne, was president of the Richmond Agricultural Society and served as a trustee for Saint Francis College in Richmond. In 1857, Webb was elected to the Legislative Assembly of the Province of Canada for Richmond & Wolfe. He was defeated in 1861 but reelected in 1863. Webb was named Queen's Counsel in 1867. He was elected to the federal parliament after Confederation and served until 1874. In 1875, he was named to the Legislative Council of Quebec for Wellington division and served until 1887, when he was appointed sheriff for Saint-François district. He died at Sherbrooke in 1890 from an apoplectic fit.

== Electoral record ==
1867 Canadian federal election: Richmond—Wolfe
Party	Candidate	Votes
Conservative	William Hoste Webb	1,137
Unknown	Mr. Beique	903
Source: Canadian Elections Database

1872 Canadian federal election: Richmond—Wolfe
Party	Candidate	Votes
Conservative	William Hoste Webb	893
Unknown	J. Graham	483
Unknown	O. Gaudet	389
Unknown	W. Jones	290
Source: Canadian Elections Database

1874 Canadian federal election: Richmond—Wolfe
Party	Candidate	Votes
Liberal	Henry Aylmer	1,111
Unknown	William Hoste Webb	949
Unknown	O. Gaudet	10
Source: lop.parl.ca
