= John Moore (Lower Canada politician) =

Lower Canada contractor and politician

Member of the Legislative Assembly of Lower Canada
- In office 1835 – March 27, 1838 Serving with Colonel Bartholomew Gugy
- Preceded by: Charles Frederick Henry Goodhue
- Succeeded by: None; constitution suspended

Member of the Legislative Assembly of the Province of Canada for Sherbrooke County
- In office 1841–1844
- Preceded by: New position
- Succeeded by: Samuel Brooks

Personal details
- Born: before 1814 England
- Died: after 1858
- Party: Lower Canada: Bureaucrats Party; Province of Canada: Government Tory (1841–1842) "British" Tory (1843–1844)
- Spouse: Lois Caswell
- Occupation: Contractor

John Moore (born before 1814 – died 1858 or later) was a contractor and political figure in Lower Canada (now Quebec), first serving in the Legislative Assembly of Lower Canada and then the Legislative Assembly of the Province of Canada. He initially was a strong supporter of the Governor General, appointed by the British government, but gradually shifted towards a Reform viewpoint, where the elected Legislative Assembly would have greater powers. Little is known of his life.

Moore was probably born in England and emigrated at some point to Lower Canada, settling in the Eastern Townships. In 1824 he married Lois Caswell in a Protestant church at Shipton (now part of Danville, Quebec). In 1825, Moore was colonization agent for Newport township. He was engaged in railway construction between 1843 and 1853.

Moore was elected in 1834 to the Legislative Assembly of Lower Canada (the lower house of the Parliament of Lower Canada), representing Sherbrooke, in tandem with Colonel Bartholomew Gugy. He generally aligned with the Bureaucrats Party, supporting the position of the governor. His position ended when the British government suspended the constitution of Lower Canada in 1838, after the outbreak of the Lower Canada Rebellion in November 1837. He is believed to have organised a group of around fifty men for the government militia during the Rebellion.

Following the rebellion in Lower Canada, and the similar rebellion in 1837 in Upper Canada (now Ontario), the British government decided to merge the two provinces into a single province, as recommended by Lord Durham in the Durham Report. The Union Act, 1840, passed by the British Parliament, abolished the two provinces and their separate parliaments. It created the Province of Canada, with a single Parliament for the entire province, composed of an elected Legislative Assembly and an appointed Legislative Council. The Governor General initially retained a strong position in the government.

In the first general election for the new Legislative Assembly in 1841, Moore was elected by acclamation for Sherbrooke County, as a supporter of the union. One of the first major issues in the new Assembly was a vote on the way union had been carried out. Moore voted in favour of the union. He was initially a consistent supporter of Governor General Lord Sydenham in the 1841 session. He also opposed changes to the ministry in 1842 which resulted in a greater Reform balance. However, when the ministry resigned the next year in a conflict with the new Governor General, Sir Charles Metcalfe, he voted in support of the outgoing ministers. His voting pattern over the course of the Parliament showed a gradual shift from clear support for the Governor General to increasing support for the Reform movement and the powers of the Assembly.

Moore was nominated as a candidate in the general elections of 1844, but he withdrew his name before the balloting. Little is known of his later life. He is known to have been living in Sherbrooke in 1858.
