= Élisabeth Brière =

Canadian politician

The Honourable Élisabeth Brière PC MP

Minister of Veterans Affairs
- In office March 14, 2025 – May 13, 2025
- Prime Minister: Mark Carney
- Preceded by: Darren Fisher
- Succeeded by: Jill McKnight

Minister responsible for the Canada Revenue Agency (Note: Position titled Minister of National Revenue until March 14, 2025)
- In office December 20, 2024 – May 13, 2025
- Prime Minister: Justin Trudeau; Mark Carney
- Preceded by: Marie-Claude Bibeau
- Succeeded by: François-Philippe Champagne

Member of Parliament for Sherbrooke
- Incumbent
- Assumed office October 21, 2019
- Preceded by: Pierre-Luc Dusseault

Personal details
- Born: 1967 or 1968 (age 57–58) Quebec City, Quebec, Canada
- Party: Liberal
- Children: 3

Élisabeth Brière (French pronunciation: [elizabɛt bʁiɛʁ]; born 1967 or 1968) is a Canadian politician and notary who has served as the member of Parliament in for the riding of Sherbrooke since 2019 as a member of the Liberal Party. She served as Minister responsible for the Canada Revenue Agency from December 2024 to May 2025 and as Minister of Veterans Affairs from March to May, 2025.

== Background ==
Brière was born in 1967 or 1968 in Quebec City, Quebec. She completed a Bachelor of Laws at the Université de Sherbrooke and obtained a diploma in notarial law in 1991, as well as a certificate in business administration in 1993.

Before entering politics, Brière worked as a notary for nearly 30 years. She also lectured at the Université de Sherbrooke and served as the president of Maison Aube-Lumière, a palliative care residence.

== Political career ==
In August 2019, Brière was confirmed as the Liberal Party's candidate for the riding of Sherbrooke in advance of the 2019 federal election. On October 21, she unseated NDP incumbent Pierre-Luc Dusseault. She was the first woman elected in the riding and the first Liberal elected since Irénée Pelletier in 1984.

Brière was re-elected in the 2021 and 2025 elections. She was appointed Minister responsible for the Canada Revenue Agency in December 2024 and Minister of Veterans Affairs in March 2025, a week before the election was called. She was dropped from cabinet in May 2025.

== Personal life ==
Brière is married and has three sons.

== Electoral record ==
2025 Canadian federal election: Sherbrooke
Party	Candidate	Votes	%	±%
Liberal	Élisabeth Brière	31,249	51.29	+13.75
Bloc Québécois	Pierre-Étienne Rouillard	16,224	26.63	–2.38
Conservative	Esteban Méndez-Hord	7,983	13.10	+0.27
New Democratic	Jean-Pierre Fortier	3,516	5.77	–8.16
Green	Kevin McKenna	1,383	2.27	–0.60
People's	Alexandre Lépine	576	0.95	–1.52
Total valid votes/expense limit		60,931	98.63	
Total rejected ballots		845	1.37	-0.90
Turnout		61,776	67.80	+2.65
Eligible voters		91,110		
Liberal notional hold		Swing		+8.07
Source: Elections Canada

2021 Canadian federal election: Sherbrooke
Party	Candidate	Votes	%	±%	Expenditures
Liberal	Élisabeth Brière	21,830	37.5	+8.2	$49,489.03
Bloc Québécois	Ensaf Haidar	16,848	29.0	+3.1	$32,613.67
New Democratic	Marika Lalime	8,107	13.9	-14.4	$5,314.88
Conservative	Andrea Winters	7,490	12.9	+2.3	$8,864.11
Green	Marie-Clarisse Berger	1,670	2.9	-1.6	$0.00
People's	Marcela Niculescu	1,453	2.5	–	$0.00
Free	Maxime Boivin	787	1.4	–	$2.00
Total valid votes/expense limit		58,185	97.7	–	$119,070.42
Total rejected ballots		1,355	2.3		
Turnout		59,540	65.6		
Eligible voters		90,743			
Liberal hold		Swing		+2.6	
Source: Elections Canada

2019 Canadian federal election: Sherbrooke
Party	Candidate	Votes	%	±%	Expenditures
Liberal	Élisabeth Brière	17,490	29.3	-0.5	$41,211.61
New Democratic	Pierre-Luc Dusseault	16,881	28.3	-9.0	$34,349.81
Bloc Québécois	Claude Forgues	15,470	25.9	+5.4	
Conservative	Dany Sévigny	6,362	10.6	+1.2	
Green	Mathieu Morin	2,716	4.5	+3.3	$1,651.14
Independent	Edwin Moreno	471	0.8		
Rhinoceros	Steve Côté	219	0.4		
No affiliation	Hubert Richard	117	0.2		
Total valid votes/expense limit		59,726	100.0		
Total rejected ballots		1,003			
Turnout		60,729	68.3		
Eligible voters		88,936			
Liberal gain from New Democratic		Swing		+4.25	
Source: Elections Canada
