= Léonel Beaudoin =

Canadian politician (1924–2021)

Member of the Canadian Parliament for Richmond
- In office June 25, 1968 – May 21, 1979
- Preceded by: Patrick Tobin Asselin
- Succeeded by: Alain Tardif

Personal details
- Born: September 13, 1924 Cookshire, Quebec, Canada
- Died: July 28, 2021 (aged 96) Bromptonville, Quebec, Canada
- Party: Ralliement créditiste Social Credit Party
- Occupation: Insurance Agent

Léonel Beaudoin (September 13, 1924 – July 28, 2021) was a Canadian politician and insurance agent.

Born in Cookshire, Quebec in September 1924, Beaudoin was elected to the House of Commons of Canada in the 1968 federal election as a Member of the Ralliement Créditiste to represent the riding of Richmond. After that party merged with the Social Credit Party of Canada, he was re-elected as a Social Credit candidate in the 1972 and 1974 federal elections. He ran unsuccessfully in the 1965 election in the riding of Richmond—Wolfe. He was a member of various standing committees.

Beaudoin died in Bromptonville, Quebec in July 2021 at the age of 96.
