= Town of Sherbrooke =

Former federal electoral district in Quebec, Canada

Quebec electoral district

Defunct federal electoral district
- Legislature: House of Commons
- District created: 1867
- District abolished: 1924
- First contested: 1867
- Last contested: 1921

Town of Sherbrooke (French: Ville de Sherbrooke) was a federal electoral district in Quebec, Canada, that was represented in the House of Commons of Canada from 1867 to 1925.

It was created by the British North America Act, 1867. It consisted of the Town of Sherbrooke. It was abolished in 1924 and replaced by Sherbrooke riding.

== Members of Parliament ==
This riding elected the following members of Parliament:

| Parliament | Years | Member | Party |
|---|---|---|---|
Town of Sherbrooke
| 1st | 1867–1872 | Alexander Tilloch Galt | Liberal–Conservative |
| 2nd | 1872–1874 | Edward Towle Brooks | Conservative |
| 3rd | 1874–1878 | Edward Towle Brooks | Conservative |
| 4th | 1878–1882 | Edward Towle Brooks | Conservative |
| 5th | 1882–1887 | Robert Newton Hall | Liberal–Conservative |
| 6th | 1887–1891 | Robert Newton Hall | Liberal–Conservative |
| 7th | 1891–1892 | William Bullock Ives | Conservative |
| 7th | 1892–1896 | William Bullock Ives | Conservative |
| 8th | 1896–1899 | William Bullock Ives | Conservative |
| 8th | 1900–1900 | John McIntosh | Conservative |
| 9th | 1900–1904 | John McIntosh | Conservative |
| 10th | 1904–1905 | Arthur Norreys Worthington | Conservative |
| 10th | 1906–1908 | Arthur Norreys Worthington | Conservative |
| 11th | 1908–1911 | Arthur Norreys Worthington | Conservative |
| 12th | 1911–1917 | Francis McCrea | Liberal |
| 13th | 1917–1921 | Francis McCrea | Opposition (Laurier Liberals) |
| 14th | 1921–1925 | Francis McCrea | Liberal |
Riding dissolved into Sherbrooke

== Election results ==
1867 Canadian federal election
| Party | Candidate | Votes |
|---|---|---|
| Liberal–Conservative | Alexander Tilloch Galt | acclaimed |
Source: Canadian Elections Database

1872 Canadian federal election
| Party | Candidate | Votes |
|---|---|---|
| Conservative | Edward Towle Brooks | acclaimed |
Source: Canadian Elections Database

1874 Canadian federal election
| Party | Candidate | Votes |
|---|---|---|
| Conservative | Edward Towle Brooks | acclaimed |
Source: lop.parl.ca

1878 Canadian federal election
| Party | Candidate | Votes |
|---|---|---|
| Conservative | Edward Towle Brooks | acclaimed |

1882 Canadian federal election
| Party | Candidate | Votes |
|---|---|---|
| Liberal–Conservative | Robert Newton Hall | acclaimed |

1887 Canadian federal election
| Party | Candidate | Votes |
|---|---|---|
| Liberal–Conservative | Robert Newton Hall | 1,081 |
| Liberal | L. C. Bélanger | 504 |

1891 Canadian federal election
| Party | Candidate | Votes |
|---|---|---|
| Conservative | William Bullock Ives | 1,118 |
| Liberal | Clement Millier | 803 |

By-election: On Mr. Ives being appointed President of the Privy Council, 5 December 1892

By-election on 21 December 1892
| Party | Candidate | Votes |
| Conservative | William Bullock Ives | acclaimed |

1896 Canadian federal election
| Party | Candidate | Votes |
|---|---|---|
| Conservative | William Bullock Ives | 1,478 |
| Liberal | Henry Aylmer | 1,221 |

By-election: On Mr. Ives' death, 15 July 1899

By-election on 25 January 1900
| Party | Candidate | Votes |
| Conservative | John McIntosh | 1,397 |
| Liberal | George Albert Le Baron | 1,301 |

1900 Canadian federal election
| Party | Candidate | Votes |
|---|---|---|
| Conservative | John McIntosh | 1,693 |
| Liberal | George Albert Lebaron | 1,662 |

1904 Canadian federal election
| Party | Candidate | Votes |
|---|---|---|
| Conservative | Arthur Norreys Worthington | 1,875 |
| Liberal | Charles Cair Knight | 1,749 |

By-election: On election being declared void, 4 December 1905

By-election on 6 February 1906
| Party | Candidate | Votes |
| Conservative | Arthur Norreys Worthington | acclaimed |

1908 Canadian federal election
| Party | Candidate | Votes |
|---|---|---|
| Conservative | Arthur Norreys Worthington | 2,117 |
| Liberal | John Leonard | 1,973 |

1911 Canadian federal election
| Party | Candidate | Votes |
|---|---|---|
| Liberal | Francis McCrea | 2,321 |
| Conservative | Charles Dickinson White | 2,282 |

1917 Canadian federal election
| Party | Candidate | Votes |
|---|---|---|
| Opposition (Laurier Liberals) | Francis McCrea | 4,151 |
| Government (Unionist) | William Stewart Davidson | 3,409 |

1921 Canadian federal election
| Party | Candidate | Votes |
|---|---|---|
| Liberal | Francis McCrea | 9,043 |
| Conservative | Edward Bruen Worthington | 4,535 |

== See also ==
- List of Canadian electoral districts
- Historical federal electoral districts of Canada
