= Edmund William Tobin =

Canadian politician

The Hon. Edmund William Tobin
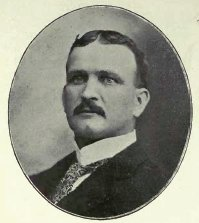

Member of the Canadian Parliament for Richmond—Wolfe
- In office 1900–1930
- Preceded by: Michael Thomas Stenson
- Succeeded by: François-Joseph Laflèche

Senator for Victoria
- In office 1930–1938
- Appointed by: William Lyon Mackenzie King
- Preceded by: Henry Joseph Cloran
- Succeeded by: William James Hushion

Personal details
- Born: September 14, 1865 Brompton Falls, Canada East
- Died: June 24, 1938 (aged 72)
- Party: Liberal
- Children: Edmund Tobin Asselin, grandson Joseph Patrick Tobin Asselin, grandson

Edmund William Tobin (September 14, 1865 – June 24, 1938) was a Canadian politician.

Born in Brompton Falls, Canada East, he was a lumber merchant and manufacturer who was President of the Lotbiniere Lumber Company in Lester, Quebec and President of the Trois-Pistoles Pulp Company in Trois-Pistoles, Quebec. He was Warden of the County of Richmond in 1897-98 and Mayor of Brompton Falls. He was first elected to the House of Commons of Canada for the riding of Richmond—Wolfe in the 1900 federal election. A Liberal, he would be re-elected every time for the next 7 elections until being summoned to the Senate of Canada on the advice of William Lyon Mackenzie King in 1930 representing the senatorial division of Victoria, Quebec. He would serve until his death in 1938.

His grandsons, Edmund Tobin Asselin (1920–1999) and Joseph Patrick Tobin Asselin (1930–2005), were both Members of Parliament.
