= William Bullock Ives =

Canadian politician

The Honourable William Ives PC QC
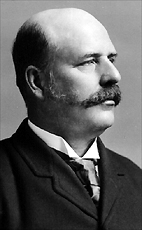

Member of the Canadian Parliament for Richmond—Wolfe
- In office 1878–1891
- Preceded by: Henry Aylmer
- Succeeded by: Clarence Chester Cleveland

Member of the Canadian Parliament for Sherbrooke
- In office 1891–1899
- Preceded by: Robert Newton Hall
- Succeeded by: John McIntosh

Personal details
- Born: William Bullock Ives; November 17, 1841 Compton Township, Canada East
- Died: July 15, 1899 (aged 57) Ottawa, Ontario, Canada
- Resting place: Elmwood Cemetery (Sherbrooke)
- Party: Conservative
- Occupation: Businessman, lawyer

William Bullock Ives, PC QC (November 17, 1841 – July 15, 1899) was a Canadian politician, who served in the House of Commons of Canada from 1878 to 1899. A member of the Conservative Party of Canada, he represented the electoral districts of Richmond—Wolfe from 1878 to 1891 and Sherbrooke from 1891 to 1899, and served as the President of the Privy Council and Minister of Trade and Commerce.

Prior to his election to the House of Commons, Ives worked as a lawyer and businessman in Sherbrooke, Quebec, and served on the town council and as mayor.

He died in Ottawa on July 15, 1899.

== Electoral record ==
1878 Canadian federal election: Richmond—Wolfe
Party	Candidate	Votes
Conservative	William Bullock Ives	1,684
Liberal	Henry Aylmer	1,069

1882 Canadian federal election: Richmond—Wolfe
Party	Candidate	Votes
Conservative	William Bullock Ives	acclaimed

1887 Canadian federal election: Richmond—Wolfe
Party	Candidate	Votes
Conservative	William Bullock Ives	2,355
Liberal	J.N. Greenshields	2,218
