= Florent Dubois =

Canadian politician

Victor Florent Dubois

Member of Parliament for Richmond—Wolfe
- In office March 1958 – June 1962
- Preceded by: Ernest-Omer Gingras
- Succeeded by: André Bernier

Personal details
- Born: 12 March 1906 Saint-Paul-de-Chester, Quebec, Canada
- Died: 18 December 1987 (aged 81)
- Party: Progressive Conservative
- Profession: manager, merchant

Victor Florent Dubois (12 March 1906 – 18 December 1987) was a Progressive Conservative party member of the House of Commons of Canada. Born in Saint-Paul-de-Chester, Quebec, he was a manager and merchant by career.

He was first elected at the Richmond—Wolfe riding in the 1958 general election. Dubois served one term, the 24th Canadian Parliament, until he was defeated in the 1962 election by André Bernier of the Social Credit party. Dubois made another attempt to win the riding in the 1963 election but lost again. He made no further federal election attempts after this.
