= Richmond—Wolfe =

Former federal electoral district in Quebec, Canada

Coordinates: 45.65°N 72.13°W

Quebec electoral district

Defunct federal electoral district
- Legislature: House of Commons
- District created: 1867
- District abolished: 1996
- First contested: 1867
- Last contested: 1993

Richmond—Wolfe (also known as Richmond) was a federal electoral district in Quebec, Canada, that was represented in the House of Commons of Canada from 1867 to 1997.

It was created as by the British North America Act, 1867.

It was abolished in 1966 when it was redistributed into Richmond and Drummond ridings.

Richmond riding was renamed "Richmond—Wolfe" in 1980.

In 1996, it was again abolished when it was redistributed into the new districts of Richmond—Arthabaska and Compton—Stanstead.

== Members of Parliament ==
This riding elected the following members of Parliament:

Parliament	Years	Member	Party
Richmond—Wolfe
1st	1867–1872	William Hoste Webb	Conservative
2nd	1872–1874	William Hoste Webb	Conservative
3rd	1874–1874	Henry Aylmer	Liberal
3rd	1874–1878	Henry Aylmer	Liberal
4th	1878–1882	William Bullock Ives	Conservative
5th	1882–1887	William Bullock Ives	Conservative
6th	1887–1891	William Bullock Ives	Conservative
7th	1891–1896	Clarence Chester Cleveland	Conservative
8th	1896–1900	Michael Thomas Stenson	Liberal
9th	1900–1904	Edmund William Tobin	Liberal
10th	1904–1908	Edmund William Tobin	Liberal
11th	1908–1911	Edmund William Tobin	Liberal
12th	1911–1917	Edmund William Tobin	Liberal
13th	1917–1921	Edmund William Tobin	Opposition (Laurier Liberals)
14th	1921–1925	Edmund William Tobin	Liberal
15th	1925–1926	Edmund William Tobin	Liberal
16th	1926–1930	Edmund William Tobin	Liberal
17th	1930–1935	François-Joseph Laflèche	Conservative
18th	1935–1940	James Patrick Mullins	Liberal
19th	1940–1945	James Patrick Mullins	Liberal
20th	1945–1949	James Patrick Mullins	Liberal
21st	1949–1953	Ernest-Omer Gingras	Liberal
22nd	1953–1957	Ernest-Omer Gingras	Liberal
23rd	1957–1958	Ernest-Omer Gingras	Liberal
24th	1958–1962	Florent Dubois	Progressive Conservative
25th	1962–1963	André Bernier	Social Credit
26th	1963–1965	Patrick Tobin Asselin	Liberal
27th	1965–1968	Patrick Tobin Asselin	Liberal
Riding dissolved into Richmond and Drummond
Richmond
28th	1968–1971	Léonel Beaudoin	Ralliement créditiste
28th	1971–1972	Léonel Beaudoin	Social Credit
29th	1972–1974	Léonel Beaudoin	Social Credit
30th	1974–1979	Léonel Beaudoin	Social Credit
31st	1979–1980	Alain Tardif	Liberal
Richmond—Wolfe
32nd	1980–1984	Alain Tardif	Liberal
33rd	1984–1988	Alain Tardif	Liberal
34th	1988–1993	Yvon Côté	Progressive Conservative
35th	1993–1997	Gaston Leroux	Bloc Québécois
Riding dissolved into Richmond—Arthabaska and Compton—Stanstead

== Election results ==
=== Richmond—Wolfe, 1867–1968 ===
1867 Canadian federal election
Party	Candidate	Votes
Conservative	William Hoste Webb	1,137
Unknown	Mr. Beique	903
Source: Canadian Elections Database

1872 Canadian federal election
Party	Candidate	Votes
Conservative	William Hoste Webb	893
Unknown	J. Graham	483
Unknown	O. Gaudet	389
Unknown	W. Jones	290
Source: Canadian Elections Database

1874 Canadian federal election
Party	Candidate	Votes
Liberal	Henry Aylmer	1,111
Unknown	William Hoste Webb	949
Unknown	O. Gaudet	10
Source: lop.parl.ca

By-election on 4 December 1874 On Mr. Aylmer being unseated on petition, 24 October 1874
Party	Candidate	Votes
Liberal	Henry Aylmer	978
Unknown	Henry-R. Hanning	592
Unknown	L.C. Bélanger	414
Unknown	Mr. Scarry	19

1878 Canadian federal election
Party	Candidate	Votes
Conservative	William Bullock Ives	1,684
Liberal	Henry Aylmer	1,069

1882 Canadian federal election
Party	Candidate	Votes
Conservative	William Bullock Ives	acclaimed

1887 Canadian federal election
Party	Candidate	Votes
Conservative	William Bullock Ives	2,355
Liberal	J.N. Greenshields	2,218

1891 Canadian federal election
Party	Candidate	Votes	%	Elected
Conservative	Clarence Chester Cleveland	2,416	53.09	✓
Liberal	Wilfrid Laurier	2,135	46.91	
Total valid votes		4,551	100.00	
Source(s) "Richmond--Wolfe, Quebec (1867-08-06 - 1968-04-22)". History of Federal Ridings Since 1867. Library of Parliament.

1896 Canadian federal election
Party	Candidate	Votes
Liberal	M.T. Stenson	2,782
Conservative	C.C. Cleveland	2,544

1900 Canadian federal election
Party	Candidate	Votes
Liberal	Edmund William Tobin	3,500
Conservative	Joseph-H. Coté-crépeau	2,517

1904 Canadian federal election
Party	Candidate	Votes
Liberal	Edmund William Tobin	3,689
Conservative	Moïse O'Brady	2,516

1908 Canadian federal election
Party	Candidate	Votes
Liberal	Edmund William Tobin	3,850
Conservative	John Champoux	3,051

1911 Canadian federal election
Party	Candidate	Votes
Liberal	Edmund William Tobin	3,855
Conservative	John Hayes	3,311

1917 Canadian federal election
Party	Candidate	Votes
Opposition (Laurier Liberals)	Edmund William Tobin	6,448
Government (Unionist)	Marcus George Crombie	1,634

1921 Canadian federal election
Party	Candidate	Votes
Liberal	Edmund William Tobin	10,340
Independent	Azarie Lemire	2,986

1925 Canadian federal election
Party	Candidate	Votes
Liberal	Edmund William Tobin	7,292
Conservative	Joseph Hormisdas Paré	3,689

1926 Canadian federal election
Party	Candidate	Votes
Liberal	Edmund William Tobin	8,788
Conservative	John Hayes	5,100

1930 Canadian federal election
Party	Candidate	Votes
Conservative	François-Joseph Laflèche	9,025
Liberal	Walter George Mitchell	7,870

1935 Canadian federal election
Party	Candidate	Votes
Liberal	James Patrick Mullins	6,278
Conservative	François-Joseph Laflèche	5,034
Independent Liberal	Marcel Bédard	2,533
Reconstruction	Phidime Brodeur	950

1940 Canadian federal election
Party	Candidate	Votes
Liberal	James Patrick Mullins	8,554
National Government	Joseph-Alexandre Goulet	4,295

1945 Canadian federal election
Party	Candidate	Votes
Liberal	James Patrick Mullins	8,459
Bloc populaire	Émilien Lafrance	5,088
Independent	Arthur-H. Marcotte	1,271
Social Credit	Roland Pelletier	1,147

1949 Canadian federal election
Party	Candidate	Votes
Liberal	Ernest-Omer Gingras	13,621
Progressive Conservative	J.-Gustave Nadeau	3,990
Union des électeurs	Rolland Pelletier	2,493

1953 Canadian federal election
Party	Candidate	Votes
Liberal	Ernest-Omer Gingras	13,006
Progressive Conservative	Albert Nicol	7,254
Labor–Progressive	Hubert Rhéaume	133

1957 Canadian federal election
Party	Candidate	Votes
Liberal	Ernest-Omer Gingras	10,300
Progressive Conservative	Albert Nicol	7,243
Independent Liberal	J.-Raymond Noël	4,508

1958 Canadian federal election
Party	Candidate	Votes
Progressive Conservative	V.-Florent Dubois	11,984
Liberal	Ernest-Omer Gingras	11,299
Social Credit	Lucien Bachand	560

1962 Canadian federal election
Party	Candidate	Votes
Social Credit	André Bernier	11,816
Liberal	Gaston-H. Théroux	6,430
Progressive Conservative	V.-Florent Dubois	5,843

1963 Canadian federal election
Party	Candidate	Votes
Liberal	Patrick Tobin Asselin	8,762
Social Credit	André Bernier	8,312
Progressive Conservative	V.-Florent Dubois	4,063
New Democratic	Lewis Craig	928

1965 Canadian federal election
Party	Candidate	Votes
Liberal	Patrick Tobin Asselin	8,685
Ralliement créditiste	Léonel Beaudoin	6,662
Progressive Conservative	J.-Osias Poirier	4,359
New Democratic	André Drouin	1,660

=== Richmond, 1968–1980 ===
1968 Canadian federal election
Party	Candidate	Votes
Ralliement créditiste	Léonel Beaudoin	11,853
Liberal	Patrick-T. Asselin	8,870
Progressive Conservative	Falconio Tardif	3,527
New Democratic	Nicole Rinfret-bédard	608

1972 Canadian federal election
Party	Candidate	Votes
Social Credit	Léonel Beaudoin	14,133
Liberal	Léo-Paul Thibeault	8,657
Progressive Conservative	Lucien Bachand	3,887
New Democratic	Francine Mailloux	624

1974 Canadian federal election
Party	Candidate	Votes
Social Credit	Léonel Beaudoin	11,825
Liberal	Jean-Yves Poisson	9,526
Progressive Conservative	Lucien Bachand	5,094
New Democratic	Laurian Lefrancois	917

1979 Canadian federal election
Party	Candidate	Votes
Liberal	Alain Tardif	15,135
Social Credit	Denis Beaudoin	14,662
Progressive Conservative	Roger Bibeau	2,472
New Democratic	Lida Bourgeois	551
Rhinoceros	Fern Prince	414
Union populaire	Guy Baillargeon	162

=== Richmond—Wolfe, 1980–1997 ===
1980 Canadian federal election
Party	Candidate	Votes
Liberal	Alain Tardif	21,104
Progressive Conservative	Denis Beaudoin	8,365
New Democratic	André Cardinal	1,477
Social Credit	Serge Boissonneault	1,322
Rhinoceros	Denys Caron	876
lop.parl.ca

1984 Canadian federal election
Party	Candidate	Votes
Liberal	Alain Tardif	18,069
Progressive Conservative	Jean-Jacques Croteau	13,835
New Democratic	Harriet J. Schleifer	1,638
Parti nationaliste	Ivan Hébert-croteau	1,339
Social Credit	Léo Dion	273

1988 Canadian federal election
Party	Candidate	Votes
Progressive Conservative	Yvon Coté	19,451
Liberal	Alain Tardif	16,813
New Democratic	Marc-André Péloquin	3,918
Rhinoceros	Jean Marceau	790

1993 Canadian federal election
Party	Candidate	Votes
Bloc Québécois	Gaston Leroux	22,235
Progressive Conservative	Yvon Coté	10,004
Liberal	Gaétan Dumas	9,159
Natural Law	Anne-Marie Marois	678
New Democratic	Marc-André Peloquin	476

== See also ==
- List of Canadian electoral districts
- Historical federal electoral districts of Canada
