= Michael Thomas Stenson =

Canadian politician

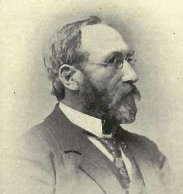

Member of the Canadian Parliament for Richmond—Wolfe
- In office 1896–1900
- Preceded by: Clarence Chester Cleveland
- Succeeded by: Edmund William Tobin

Personal details
- Born: December 18, 1838 Longford, County Meath, Ireland
- Died: April 28, 1912 (aged 73)
- Party: Liberal

Michael Thomas Stenson (December 18, 1838 – April 28, 1912) was a Canadian politician.

Born in Longford, County Meath, Ireland, the son of John Stenson, Stenson moved with his family to Canada in 1840 settling in Lower Canada. He was educated at St. Mary's College, Montreal where he took a classical course, and at Sainte-Anne-de-la-Pocatière, where he took a course in agriculture. In May 1864, he obtained certificate from Military School at Montreal. He was a farmer, school teacher, was a Public School Inspector. He was Mayor of Wotton Township and Warden of Wolfe County. He was elected to the House of Commons of Canada for the electoral district of Richmond—Wolfe in the general elections of 1896. A Liberal, he did run in 1900.
