= James Ross (MLA) =

Canadian politician

Member of the Legislative Assembly of Quebec for Compton
- In office 1867–1871
- Succeeded by: William Sawyer

Personal details
- Born: 6 September 1814 Fearn, Scotland
- Died: 23 January 1874 (aged 59) Gould, Quebec
- Party: Conservative
- Spouse: Marianna Browne
- Education: Invergordon Grammar School, Invergordon, Scotland
- Occupation: Merchant

James Ross (6 September 1814 – 23 January 1874) was a member of the Legislative Assembly of Quebec.

He was born in Fearn, Ross and Cromarty, Scotland, son of Alexander Ross and Christian Ross, and emigrated to Quebec City in approximately 1829. In the 1830s, he worked in a mercantile house in Quebec and was captain of a ship trading to the West Indies. On 10 May 1838, he married Marianna Browne (1820–1890) of Quebec City, with whom he had fourteen children (ten surviving). He and his family subsequently relocated to the Eastern Townships and in 1845 he founded the village of Gould, Quebec, where he manufactured pearl ash, ran a general store and served as the village's mayor. He spoke four languages – English, Gaelic, French and Spanish – and contributed poetry to newspapers such as the Sherbrooke Gazette.

Ross was heavily involved with the politics of the Sherbrooke region and is recorded as having moved the resolution for the organization of the County of Sherbrooke in May 1848. He was named in a local newspaper as one of several likely candidates for election to the legislature of the Province of Canada in 1857. His ambitions for high office were finally achieved when he was elected to the first Legislative Assembly of Quebec in the 1867 general election. Ross was a member of the Conservative Party of Quebec and represented the electoral district of Compton. He defeated Alden Kendrick, a merchant. Ross himself was defeated for re-election in 1871 by another Conservative, William Sawyer, who contested the seat at the behest of John Henry Pope after Ross declined to support a railway project promoted by Pope. After his defeat, Ross was appointed Dominion Emigration Agent for Scotland and visited his home country in 1872 and 1873, giving lectures on Canadian emigration. Ross contracted pneumonia on his return from the 1873 trip and died at his home in Gould on 23 January 1874.
