= John McIntosh (Quebec politician) =

Canadian politician (1841–1904)

Member of the Canadian Parliament for Town of Sherbrooke
- In office 1900–1904
- Preceded by: William Bullock Ives
- Succeeded by: Arthur Norreys Worthington

Member of the Legislative Assembly of Quebec for Compton
- In office 1886–1894
- Preceded by: William Sawyer
- Succeeded by: Charles McClary

Personal details
- Born: October 27, 1841 La Prairie, Canada East
- Died: July 12, 1904 (aged 62) Sherbrooke, Quebec
- Party: Conservative Party of Canada (1867–1942)

John McIntosh (October 27, 1841 – July 12, 1904) was a farmer and political figure in Quebec. He represented Compton in the Legislative Assembly of Quebec from 1886 to 1894 and Town of Sherbrooke in the House of Commons of Canada from 1900 to 1904 as a Conservative member.

He was born in La Prairie, Canada East, the son of John McIntosh and Margaret Brodie, and was educated there. McIntosh settled on a farm in Compton in 1860. He became manager for the Canadian Meat & Produce Company and the Canadian Meat & Stock Raising Company and later was involved in exporting livestock to England. McIntosh was president of the agricultural society for the Eastern Townships. He served on the municipal council for Compton for six years and later was a member of the school board and municipal council for Waterville. In 1870, he married Jeanette Greig. McIntosh served as a minister without portfolio in the Quebec cabinet from 1891 to 1894. In 1893 he was the Commissioner from the province of Quebec for the World's Columbian Exposition, Chicago, from 1 May to 31 October. He resigned his seat in 1894 after being named sheriff for Saint-François district. He served in that function until 1899, settling in Sherbrooke. McIntosh was elected to the Canadian House of Commons in a 1900 by-election held following the death of William Bullock Ives. He was reelected in the 1900 federal election. McIntosh died in office in Sherbrooke at the age of 62.
