= Arthur Norreys Worthington =

Canadian politician

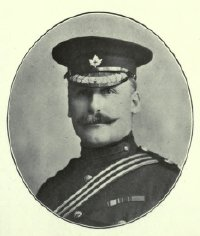

Member of the Canadian Parliament for Town of Sherbrooke
- In office 1904–1911
- Preceded by: John McIntosh
- Succeeded by: Francis McCrea

Personal details
- Born: February 17, 1862 Sherbrooke, Canada East
- Died: February 7, 1912 (aged 49) Sherbrooke, Quebec
- Party: Conservative

Arthur Norreys Worthington (February 17, 1862 – February 7, 1912) was a Canadian physician, surgeon, soldier, and politician.

== Biography ==
Born in Sherbrooke, Canada East, the son of Edward Dagge Worthington (1820–1895), Worthington was educated at the Sherbrooke Academy, Bishop's College and McGill University. A physician and surgeon, he was surgeon to the 53rd Regiment and to the Sherbrooke Protestant Hospital. He served in the North-West Rebellion in 1885, where he was awarded a medal and clasp and was mentioned in dispatches. He took part in the South Africa Campaign in 1900–1901, and was awarded a medal and three clasps. He was also named in numerous dispatches. He was promoted Lieutenant-Colonel for South African Service and appointed P.M.O. of the 5th and 6th District.

From 1901 to 1902, he was mayor of Sherbrooke. He was elected to the House of Commons of Canada for the riding of Sherbrooke in the 1904 federal election. The election was declared void in 1905 and he was acclaimed in the resulting 1906 by-election. A conservative, he was re-elected in the 1908 federal election.

He was a governor of the College of Physicians and Surgeons of the Province of Quebec and President of the District of St. Francis Medical Association.

In September 1887, he married May Cook, daughter of Hermon Henry Cook, former M.P. for Simcoe North.

He died in Sherbrooke on February 7, 1912.

== Electoral record ==
1904 Canadian federal election: Town of Sherbrooke
Party	Candidate	Votes
Conservative	Arthur Norreys Worthington	1,875
Liberal	Charles Cair Knight	1,749

By-election: On election being declared void, 4 December 1905

By-election on 6 February 1906
Party	Candidate	Votes
Conservative	Arthur Norreys Worthington	acclaimed

1908 Canadian federal election: Town of Sherbrooke
Party	Candidate	Votes
Conservative	Arthur Norreys Worthington	2,117
Liberal	John Leonard	1,973
