= Gérard Chapdelaine =

Canadian politician

Member of Parliament for Sherbrooke
- In office June 1962 – September 1965
- Preceded by: Maurice Allard
- Succeeded by: Maurice Allard

Personal details
- Born: 31 July 1935 Coaticook, Quebec
- Died: 7 August 1994 (aged 59) Sherbrooke, Quebec
- Party: Social Credit
- Profession: Lawyer

Gérard Chapdelaine (31 July 1935 – 7 August 1994) was a Social Credit party member of the House of Commons of Canada. He was a lawyer by career.

He was first elected at the Sherbrooke riding in the 1962 general election and re-elected in 1963. In the 1965 election, after being embroiled in the 1963 Social Credit party split, Chapdelaine campaigned as an independent candidate at Sherbrooke, but was defeated by independent Progressive Conservative candidate Maurice Allard.
