= François-Joseph Laflèche =

Canadian politician (1879–1945)

Member of Parliament for Richmond—Wolfe
- In office July 1930 – October 1935
- Preceded by: Edmund William Tobin
- Succeeded by: James Patrick Mullins

Personal details
- Born: 4 October 1879 Saint-Wenceslas, Quebec
- Died: 2 June 1945 (aged 65)
- Party: Conservative
- Spouse(s): Marie Blanche Pepin m. 21 October 1907
- Profession: physician

François-Joseph Laflèche (French pronunciation: [fʁɑ̃swa ʒozɛf laflɛʃ]; 4 October 1879 – 2 June 1945) was a Conservative member of the House of Commons of Canada. He was born in Saint-Wenceslas, Quebec and became a physician, surgeon and pharmacist.

Laflèche was educated at the Nicolet Seminary, then at school in Trois-Rivières. He earned his Bachelor of Arts degree at the Séminaire de Sherbrooke. He was also licensed for medical practice in the American state of Maine.

He was elected to Parliament at the Richmond—Wolfe riding in the 1930 general election. After serving his only term, the 17th Canadian Parliament, Laflèche was defeated by James Patrick Mullins of the Liberals in the 1935 federal election.

In 1934, Laflèche proposed a motion to legally require Canadian voters to cast a ballot at federal elections at a time when Australia and South Africa had already enacted compulsory voting laws.
