= Compton (provincial electoral district) =

Coordinates: 45.37°N 71.45°W

Quebec electoral district

Defunct provincial electoral district
- Legislature: National Assembly of Quebec
- District created: 1867
- District abolished: 1972
- First contested: 1867
- Last contested: 1970

Compton was a former provincial electoral district in the Estrie region of Quebec, Canada. It elected members to the National Assembly of Quebec (earlier known as the Legislative Assembly of Quebec).

It was created for the 1867 election (and a district of that name existed earlier in the Legislative Assembly of the Province of Canada). Its final election was in 1970. It disappeared in the 1973 election, when it merged with Mégantic to form the Mégantic-Compton electoral district.

== Members of the Legislative Assembly and National Assembly ==
Name	Party	Start date	End date
James Ross	Conservative	1867	1871
William Sawyer	Conservative	1871	1886
John McIntosh	Conservative	1886	1894
Charles McClary	Conservative	1894	1897
James Hunt	Liberal	1897	1900
Allan Wright Giard	Conservative	1900	1912
Georges Nathaniel Scott	Liberal	1912	1919
Camille-Émile Desjarlais	Liberal	1919	1923
Jacob Nicol	Liberal	1923	1929
Andrew Ross McMaster	Liberal	1929	1931
William James Duffy	Liberal	1931	1935
Payson Sherman	Conservative	1935	1939
William James Duffy	Liberal	1939	1946
Charles Daniel French	Union Nationale	1946	1954
John William French	Union Nationale	1954	1956
Fabien Gagnon	Liberal	1956	1957
Claude-Gilles Gosselin	Union Nationale	1957	1970
Omer Dionne	Liberal	1970	1973
