= Payson Sherman =

Canadian politician

Payson Alton Sherman

Member of the Legislative Assembly of Quebec for Compton
- In office 1935–1939
- Preceded by: William James Duffy
- Succeeded by: William James Duffy

Personal details
- Born: August 14, 1889 Scotstown, Quebec
- Died: October 5, 1977 (aged 88) Scotstown, Quebec
- Party: Conservative; Union Nationale

Payson Alton Sherman (August 14, 1889 – October 5, 1977) was a Canadian politician and a two-term Member of the Legislative Assembly of Quebec.

== Background ==
He was born in Scotstown, Quebec on August 14, 1889, to the farming couple Alton George Sherman and Annie Isabel Sherman (née Ann MacIver). Payson Sherman had eight siblings, two of which died in infancy.

After attending Scotstown High School and the Belleville Business College in Ontario, he became a trader of wood and cattle. Payson Sherman married Margaret Muir in Manchester,_New_Hampshire, on 29 September 1914.

== Member of the legislature ==
Sherman ran as a Conservative candidate in the provincial district of Compton in the 1935 election and won against Liberal incumbent William James Duffy.

He joined Maurice Duplessis's Union Nationale and was re-elected in the 1936 election. He did not offer for re-election in the 1939 election, in which Duffy succeeded.

== Mayor ==
Sherman served as school board member, city councillor and from 1947 to 1957 Mayor of Hampden, Quebec in the Eastern Townships, as well as Gouverneur of the Sherbrooke Hospital.

== Retirement ==
He co-founded the Compton County Historical Society in 1959 and died on October 5, 1977.
