= Patrick Tobin Asselin =

Canadian politician

Joseph Patrick Tobin Asselin
- Official 1966 portrait

Member of Parliament for Richmond—Wolfe
- In office April 1963 – April 1968

Personal details
- Born: 29 March 1930 Bromptonville, Quebec, Canada
- Died: August 31, 2005 (aged 75) Ottawa, Ontario, Canada
- Party: Liberal
- Profession: administrator, farmer

Joseph Patrick Tobin Asselin (March 29, 1930 – August 31, 2005), known as Patrick Tobin Asselin, was a Canadian politician. A Liberal Member of Parliament (MP) in the House of Commons of Canada for two terms in the 1960s, he returned to Parliament a quarter-century later to work as a security guard.

He was born on a farm in Bromptonville, Quebec in the Eastern Townships and was educated in Montreal at both English and French high schools. Asselin was descended from politicians on both sides of his family. He was the grandson of Edmund William Tobin, who had spent thirty years in the House of Commons, representing the same Quebec riding Asselin later represented. Tobin was appointed to the Senate of Canada in 1930.

His father, Joseph-Omer Asselin, was chairman of Montreal City Council's powerful executive committee. His mother, Beatrice Tobin, was a Liberal organizer in the era of William Lyon Mackenzie King, and served as president of the Women's Liberal Association of Canada in the 1960s. Her two sons both served as Liberal MPs. She had been awarded an Order of the British Empire during World War II for her work in establishing an organization to help Canadian Prisoners of War.

After graduating from high school, Asselin attended St. Mary's College in Halifax, Nova Scotia, and then returned to his home town to run the family's dairy farm. He was also a captain in the Canadian Army for ten years.

During the 1963 federal election, he was serving as president of the Liberal riding association in Richmond—Wolfe, the rural Quebec constituency in which he lived, when the nominated Liberal candidate unexpectedly dropped out of the race 30 days before election day. Asselin stepped in as the new candidate, and defeated incumbent Social Credit MP André Bernier by 350 votes. Asselin's brother, Edmund Tobin Asselin, was re-elected in the Montreal riding of Notre-Dame-de-Grâce in the same election.

The election brought to power a Liberal minority government under the leadership of Lester Pearson. Pearson appointed Asselin chairman of the House Standing Committee on Agriculture. Under his stewardship, the committee inaugurated Canada's marketing board system.

Asselin's margin of victory increased to 2,000 votes at the 1965 election. When Pearson announced his retirement, Asselin supported Pierre Trudeau's campaign to become Liberal leader at the 1968 Liberal leadership convention. However, despite Trudeaumania, Asselin lost his seat at the 1968 election after the right-wing Ralliement Créditiste attacked the Liberal government in the rural, socially conservative riding over the government's social liberalism, particularly Trudeau's decriminalization of homosexuality. Both Asselin and Trudeau were accused of being Communists by supporters of Asselin's rival, Léonel Beaudoin.

"I got out of politics because of illness -- the voters got sick of me," said Asselin. His defeat came six months short of the minimum period of service required at the time to qualify for a parliamentary pension. Following his defeat, Asselin worked as an aide to Agriculture minister Bud Olson.

He returned to politics to serve as mayor of Aylmer, Quebec from 1979 to 1983. He subsequently returned to Ottawa to work as a security supervisor on Parliament Hill.

Warren Allmand, a former Liberal Canadian cabinet minister, later said of Asselin: "He wasn't egotistical. Even though he had been an MP, he wasn't at all embarrassed to get a job as a security guard in order to earn a living and support his family.... Security work was all he could get, so he did it."

Asselin died in Ottawa in 2005 of a neurological disease.
