= William Sawyer (Canadian politician) =

Canadian politician

Member of the Legislative Assembly of Quebec for Compton
- In office 1871–1886
- Preceded by: James Ross
- Succeeded by: John McIntosh

Personal details
- Born: November 25, 1815 Sawyerville, Lower Canada
- Died: January 11, 1904 (aged 88) Sawyerville, Quebec
- Party: Conservative

William Sawyer (November 25, 1815 – January 11, 1904) was a lumber merchant and political figure in Quebec. He represented Compton in the Legislative Assembly of Quebec from 1871 to 1886 as a Conservative.

He was born in Sawyerville, Quebec, the son of John Sawyer. His grandfather, Josiah Sawyer, after whom Sawyerville was named, was originally from Massachusetts and received a large land grant in Eaton Township. Sawyer owned sawmills and grist mills. He was a member of the council for Eaton Township from 1855 to 1872, serving as mayor, and was warden for Compton County. In 1839, he married Julia Smith. He died at Sawyerville at the age of 88.
