= Charles McClary =

Canadian politician

Member of the Legislative Assembly of Quebec for Compton
- In office 1894–1897
- Preceded by: John McIntosh
- Succeeded by: James Hunt

Personal details
- Born: March 3, 1833 Stanstead Plain, Lower Canada
- Died: February 27, 1904 (aged 70) Montreal, Quebec
- Party: Conservative

Charles McClary (March 3, 1833 – February 27, 1904) was a farmer and political figure in Quebec. He represented Compton in the Legislative Assembly of Quebec from 1894 to 1897 as a Conservative.

== Biography ==
He was born in Stanstead Plain, Lower Canada, the son of Charles McClary and Betsy Cass, was educated in Compton and settled on a farm at Sainte-Edwidge-de-Clifton. He served on the town council for Clifton, also serving as mayor and warden for Compton County. In 1855, he married Jane Adeline McClary. He was elected to the Quebec assembly in an 1894 by-election held after John McIntosh was named county sheriff and did not run for re-election in 1897. He died in Montreal at the age of 70 and was buried in Compton.
