= Robert Newton Hall =

Canadian politician

The Honourable Robert Newton Hall
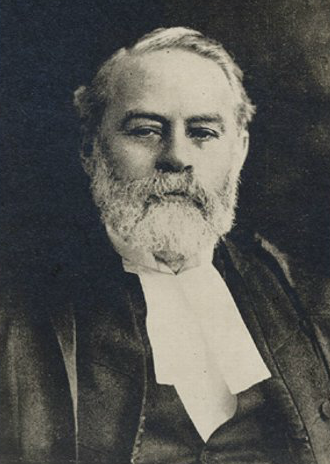

Member of the Canadian Parliament for Town of Sherbrooke
- In office 1882–1891
- Preceded by: Edward Towle Brooks
- Succeeded by: William Bullock Ives

Personal details
- Born: July 26, 1836 Laprairie, Lower Canada
- Died: July 1, 1907 (aged 70)
- Party: Liberal-Conservative
- Committees: Chair, Select Committee on Geological Surveys

Robert Newton Hall, KC (July 26, 1836 – July 1, 1907) was a lawyer, educator, judge and political figure in Quebec, Canada. He represented Town of Sherbrooke in the House of Commons of Canada from 1882 to 1891 as a Liberal-Conservative member.

He was born in Laprairie, Lower Canada, the son of the Reverend R.V. Hall, and received a B.A. from the University of Vermont in Burlington, Vermont. He was called to the Lower Canada bar in 1861 and set up practice in Sherbrooke. Hall married Lena Kendrick in 1862. He received a LL.D. from Bishop's College in 1880. In the same year, he was named Queen's Counsel. Hall was batonnier for the St. Francis section of the Quebec bar from 1877 to 1881 and was batonnier for the province in 1878. Hall served as chair of the Select Committee on Geological Surveys in 1884. He was dean of the Faculty of Law at Bishop's College. In 1873, he was named a government director for the Canadian Pacific Railway. He was president for the Massawippi Railway and for the Sherbrooke Gas and Water Company and a director of the Quebec Central Railway.

In 1892, he was named judge in the Court of Queen's Bench; he retired from the bench due to illness in March 1907. He died later that year at the age of 70 while travelling to England.

== Family ==
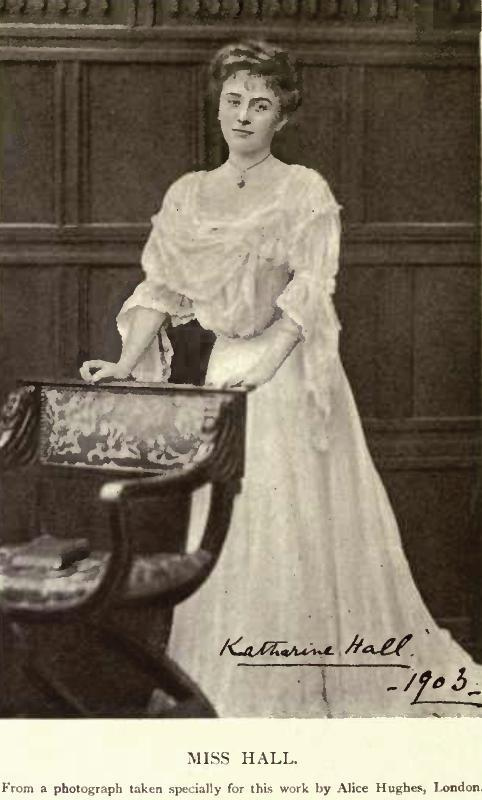
Miss Katherine Hall 1903 by Alice Hughes, London

He married Lena, eldest daughter of A. W. Kendrick, of Compton, P.Q. The couple had three daughters Katharine Hall, Adele Hall and Mrs. Ingleby, who were born and educated in Canada. The daughters were known as "The Rideau Halls" since they occupied a prominent place in Canadian society since 1887,

1882 Canadian federal election: Town of Sherbrooke
Party	Candidate	Votes
Liberal–Conservative	Robert Newton Hall	acclaimed
