= Francis McCrea =

Canadian politician (1852–1926)

Francis Nelson McCrea

Member of the Canadian Parliament for Town of Sherbrooke
- In office 1911–1925
- Preceded by: Arthur Norreys Worthington
- Succeeded by: The electoral district was abolished in 1924

Personal details
- Born: January 14, 1852 South Durham, Canada East
- Died: October 30, 1926 (aged 74) Sherbrooke, Quebec
- Party: Liberal
- Spouse: Judith Fannie Ella Wakefield
- Children: 8

Francis Nelson McCrea (January 14, 1852 – October 30, 1926) was a Canadian lumber merchant, manufacturer, and politician.

He was the Liberal Member of Parliament for the Quebec riding of Town of Sherbrooke from 1911 to 1925.

He married Judith Fannie Ella Wakefield and they had four sons and four daughters.

He died in Sherbrooke on October 30, 1926.

== Electoral record ==
1911 Canadian federal election: Town of Sherbrooke
Party	Candidate	Votes
Liberal	Francis McCrea	2,321
Conservative	Charles Dickinson White	2,282

1917 Canadian federal election: Town of Sherbrooke
Party	Candidate	Votes
Opposition (Laurier Liberals)	Francis McCrea	4,151
Government (Unionist)	William Stewart Davidson	3,409

1921 Canadian federal election: Town of Sherbrooke
Party	Candidate	Votes
Liberal	Francis McCrea	9,043
Conservative	Edward Bruen Worthington	4,535
