= William James Duffy =

Canadian politician

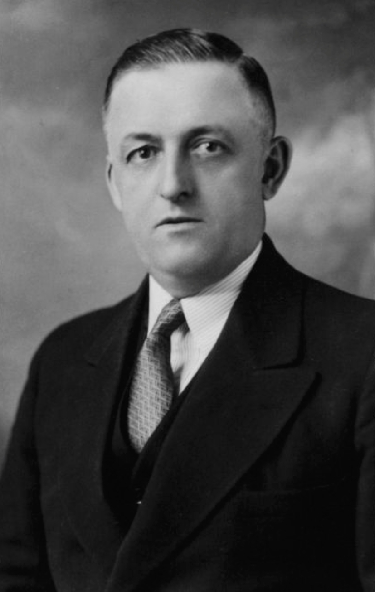

Member of the Legislative Assembly of Quebec for Compton
- In office 1931–1935
- Preceded by: Andrew Ross McMaster
- Succeeded by: Payson Sherman
- In office 1939–1946
- Preceded by: Payson Sherman
- Succeeded by: Charles Daniel French

Personal details
- Born: November 21, 1888 South Durham, Quebec
- Died: January 18, 1946 (aged 57) Gould, Quebec
- Party: Liberal

William James Duffy (November 21, 1888 – January 18, 1946) was a Canadian provincial politician.

Born in South Durham, Quebec, Duffy was the member of the Legislative Assembly of Quebec for Compton from 1931 to 1935 and 1939 to 1946.
