= Clarence Chester Cleveland =

Canadian politician

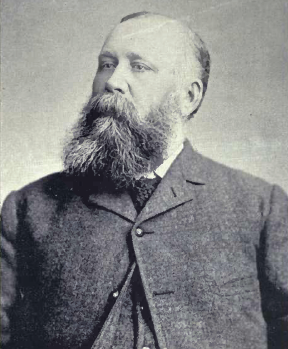

Member of the Canadian Parliament for Richmond—Wolfe
- In office 1891–1896
- Preceded by: William Bullock Ives
- Succeeded by: Michael Thomas Stenson

Personal details
- Born: September 14, 1849 Danville, Canada East
- Died: January 6, 1907 (aged 57)
- Party: Conservative

Clarence Chester Cleveland (September 14, 1849 – January 6, 1907) was a Canadian politician.

Born in Danville, Canada East, Cleveland was educated at the Lennoxville Grammar School (now Bishop's College School) in Sherbrooke, Quebec. He was a farmer and a manufacturer of leather with his brother. He was mayor of Danville and warden of Richmond County. He was a Captain in the 54th Richmond Battalion Volunteer Infantry (now the Sherbrooke Hussars. He was elected to the House of Commons of Canada for the riding of Richmond—Wolfe in the 1891 federal election defeating future Liberal Prime Minister of Canada Wilfrid Laurier (who also ran in the riding of Quebec East). A Conservative, he was defeated in the 1896 election.
