= James Hunt (Canadian politician) =

Canadian politician

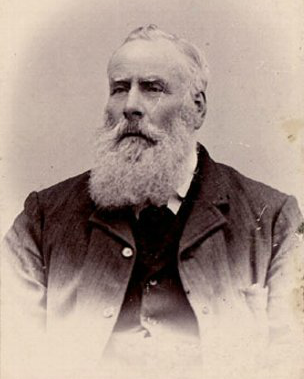

Member of the Legislative Assembly of Quebec for Compton
- In office 1897–1900
- Preceded by: Charles McClary
- Succeeded by: Allan Wright Giard

Personal details
- Born: June 22, 1835 England
- Died: November 10, 1915 (aged 80) Bury, Quebec
- Party: Liberal

James Hunt (June 22, 1835 – November 10, 1915) was a Canadian politician.

Born in England, Hunt emigrated to Lower Canada when he was two years old. Hunt served as mayor of Bury, Quebec from 1892 to 1901. He was elected to the Legislative Assembly of Quebec for Compton in 1897. A Liberal, he did not run in 1900.

He died in Bury in 1915.
