= Paul Mullins Gervais =

Canadian politician

Member of Parliament for Sherbrooke
- In office June 1968 – September 1972
- Preceded by: Maurice Allard
- Succeeded by: Irénée Pelletier

Personal details
- Born: 8 December 1925 Sherbrooke, Quebec, Canada
- Died: 29 April 1997 (aged 71) Sherbrooke, Quebec, Canada
- Party: Liberal
- Profession: lawyer

Paul Mullins Gervais (8 December 1925 – 29 April 1997) was a Liberal party member of the House of Commons of Canada. He was a lawyer.

From 1955 to 1967, Gervais served as an alderman of the Sherbrooke City Council.

He was elected to Parliament at the Sherbrooke riding in the 1968 general election. After completing one term, the 28th Canadian Parliament, Gervais left federal politics and did not seek re-election in the 1972 general vote.
