= Maurice Gingues =

Canadian politician (1903-1960)

Member of Parliament for Sherbrooke
- In office March 1940 – March 1958

Personal details
- Born: 8 November 1903 Sherbrooke, Quebec
- Died: 27 August 1960 (aged 56) Sherbrooke, Quebec
- Party: Liberal
- Profession: knitter, merchant, real estate agent/broker

Maurice Gingues (8 November 1903 – 27 August 1960) was a Liberal party member of the House of Commons of Canada. He was born in Sherbrooke, Quebec and became a knitter, a merchant and a real estate businessman.

He was first elected at the Sherbrooke riding in the 1940 general election then re-elected for successive terms in 1945, 1949, 1953 and 1957. In the 1958 election he was defeated at Sherbrooke by Maurice Allard of the Progressive Conservative party.

Gingues briefly left federal politics in 1944 to campaign as a Liberal in that year's Quebec provincial election at the Sherbrooke riding. Gingues lost to Union Nationale candidate John Samuel Bourque and returned to the House of Commons following the 1945 election.
