= André Bernier (politician) =

Canadian politician (1930–2012)

Member of the Canadian Parliament for Richmond—Wolfe
- In office 1962–1963
- Preceded by: V. Florent Dubois
- Succeeded by: Patrick Tobin Asselin

Personal details
- Born: October 29, 1930 Windsor, Quebec, Canada
- Died: May 29, 2012 (aged 81) Longueuil, Quebec, Canada
- Party: Social Credit Party
- Occupation: accountant

André Bernier (October 29, 1930 – May 29, 2012) was a Canadian politician and accountant. He was elected to the House of Commons of Canada in the 1962 election to represent the Social Credit Party in the riding of Richmond—Wolfe. He was defeated in the 1963 election.
