= Henry Aylmer (Canadian politician) =

Canadian politician

Member of the Canadian Parliament for Richmond—Wolfe
- In office 1874–1878
- Preceded by: William Hoste Webb
- Succeeded by: William Bullock Ives

Personal details
- Born: April 25, 1843 Melbourne, Canada East
- Died: July 28, 1918 (aged 75) Lennoxville, Quebec
- Party: Liberal

Henry Aylmer (April 25, 1843 – July 28, 1918) was a Canadian soldier and politician.

Born in Melbourne, Canada East, the son of Udolphus Aylmer, 7th Baron Aylmer and Mary Journeaux, Aylmer was educated at the High School of Montreal and the Royal Naval College in Portsmouth, England. He served in the Canadian militia during the Fenian raids and was a lieutenant in the Royal Marine Artillery. He organized the Richmond Field Battery in 1876 and held command until November 1887, when he retired with rank of lieutenant-colonel.

In 1870, he married Louisa Blanche Fanny, a daughter of Dr H. A. Howe, Rector of Montreal High School. Aylmer practised law in his home town of Melbourne. He was first elected to the House of Commons of Canada for the electoral district of Richmond—Wolfe in an 1874 by-election. A Liberal, he was elected in the 1874 federal election. He was defeated in 1878 and again in 1896. Aylmer died in Lennoxville at the age of 75.

== Electoral record ==
By-election on 4 December 1874 On Mr. Aylmer being unseated on petition, 24 October 1874
Party	Candidate	Votes
Liberal	Henry Aylmer	978
Unknown	Henry-R. Hanning	592
Unknown	L.C. Bélanger	414
Unknown	Mr. Scarry	19

1878 Canadian federal election: Richmond—Wolfe
Party	Candidate	Votes
Conservative	William Bullock Ives	1,684
Liberal	Henry Aylmer	1,069

== See also ==
- Baron Aylmer
