= Irénée Pelletier =

Canadian politician

Member of Parliament for Sherbrooke
- In office 30 October 1972 – 3 September 1984
- Preceded by: Paul Mullins Gervais
- Succeeded by: Jean Charest

Personal details
- Born: 17 March 1939 Saint-André, New Brunswick, Canada
- Died: 11 February 1994 (aged 54)
- Party: Liberal
- Profession: Professor

Irénée Pelletier (17 March 1939 – 11 February 1994) was a Liberal party member of the House of Commons of Canada. He was born in Saint-André, New Brunswick and earned a Bachelor of Arts degree at St. Francis Xavier University in Halifax. He then earned a PhD in political science at France's University of Toulouse. He became a professor and author by career.

Pelletier represented the Quebec federal riding of Sherbrooke where he won in the 1972 federal election. Pelletier won re-election in the 1974, 1979 and 1980 federal elections, but lost in 1984 to Jean Charest of the Progressive Conservative party.

Pelletier served four consecutive terms from the 29th to the 32nd Canadian Parliaments. He also participated in various international delegations, and served with the Royal Canadian Air Force between 1960 and 1962.
