= Serge Cardin =

Canadian politician (born 1950)

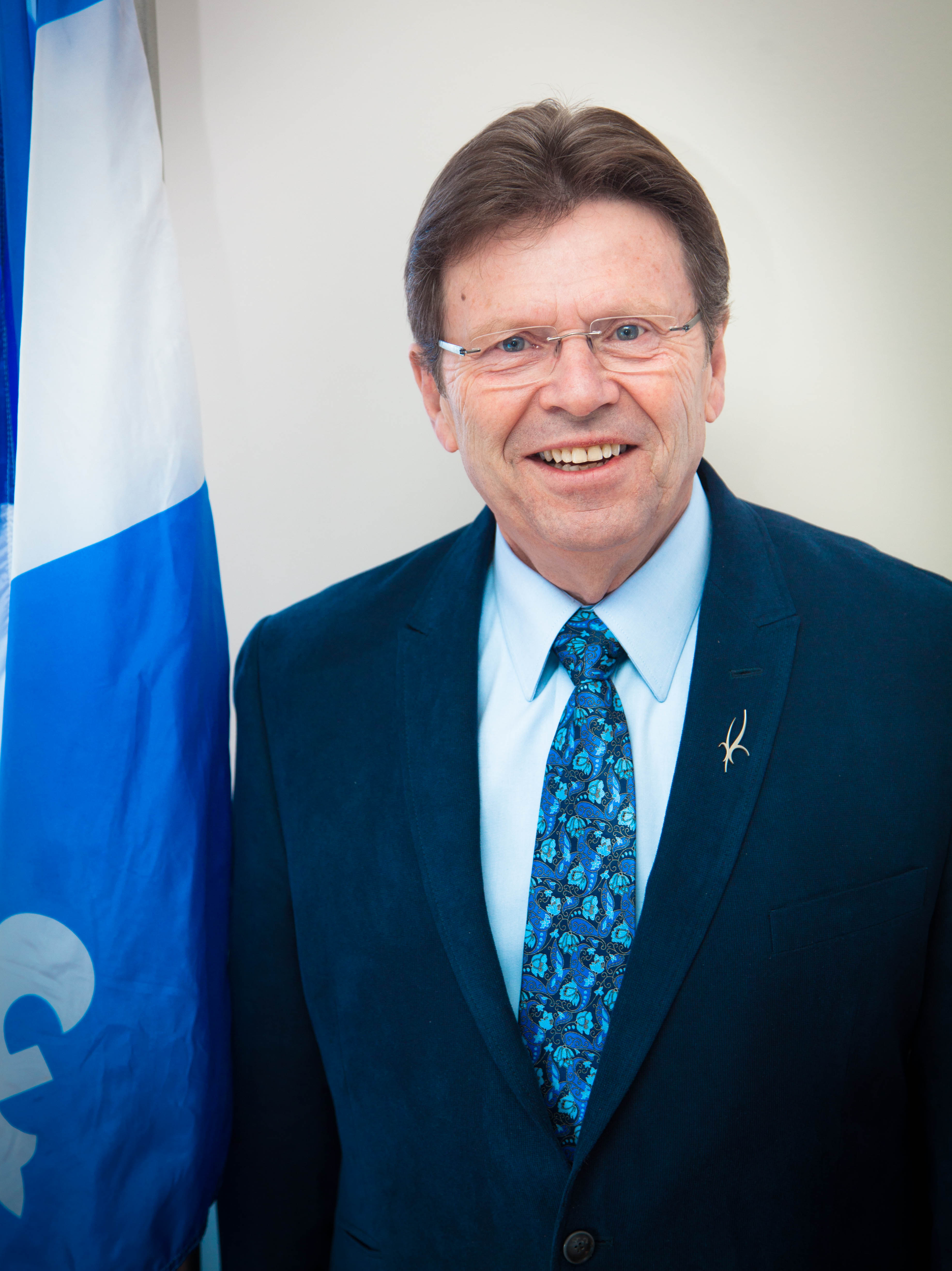
- Portrait of Serge Cardin

Member of Parliament for Sherbrooke
- In office September 14, 1998 – May 2, 2011
- Preceded by: Jean Charest
- Succeeded by: Pierre-Luc Dusseault

Member of the National Assembly of Quebec for Sherbrooke
- In office September 4, 2012 – April 7, 2014
- Preceded by: Jean Charest
- Succeeded by: Luc Fortin

Personal details
- Born: July 2, 1950 (age 76) Sherbrooke, Quebec, Canada
- Party: Parti Québécois (2012–2014)
- Other political affiliations: Bloc Québécois (Before 2011)
- Spouse: Mariette Cardin
- Profession: accountant

Serge Cardin (born July 2, 1950) is a Quebec politician. He was a Parti Québécois member of the National Assembly of Quebec for the Sherbrooke electoral district from 2012 to 2014, and was formerly a Bloc Québécois Member of Parliament for the federal riding of Sherbrooke from 1998 to 2011.

In the 2011 Canadian federal election, he lost his seat to Pierre-Luc Dusseault, then a 19-year-old university student and the youngest MP ever elected in Canadian history. In the 2012 Quebec election, he unseated the incumbent Premier of Quebec Jean Charest who was also his predecessor for the federal riding. He was defeated by Liberal candidate Luc Fortin in the 2014 Quebec election.

Born in Sherbrooke, Quebec, Cardin is an accountant. He was a city councillor in Sherbrooke from 1986 to 1998.

== Electoral record ==
2012 Quebec general election
Party	Candidate	Votes	%	±%
Parti Québécois	Serge Cardin	15,909	42.12	+4.53
Liberal	Jean Charest	13,267	35.13	-10.11
Coalition Avenir Québec	Philippe Girard	4,457	11.80	+4.95*
Québec solidaire	Christian Bibeau	2,586	6.85	+0.41
Option nationale	Évelyne Beaudin	1,069	2.83	–
Green	Suzanne Richer	407	1.08	-2.28
Parti indépendantiste	Christian Clavet	73	0.19	–
Total valid votes		37,748	99.10	–
Total rejected ballots		344	0.90	–
Turnout		38,112	78.10	+15.49
Electors on the lists		48,799	–	–

* Result compared to Action démocratique

2011 Canadian federal election
Party	Candidate	Votes	%	±%	Expenditures
New Democratic	Pierre-Luc Dusseault	22,344	43.0%	+29.9%	
Bloc Québécois	Serge Cardin	18,703	36.0%	-14.1%	
Liberal	Éric Deslauriers-Joannette	4,953	9.5%	-10.0%	
Conservative	Pierre Harvey	4,865	9.4%	-5.0%	
Green	Jacques Laberge	890	1.7%	–	
Rhinoceros	Crédible Berlingot Landry	224	0.4%	-0.5%	
Total valid votes/Expense limit		–	100.0%		

Source: Elections Canada

2008 Canadian federal election
Party	Candidate	Votes	%	±%
Bloc Québécois	Serge Cardin	25,502	50.1%	-2.2%
Liberal	Nathalie Goguen	9,947	19.5%	+6.4%
Conservative	André Bachand	8,331	16.4%	-4.3%
New Democratic	Yves Mondoux	6,676	13.1%	+4.2%
Rhinoceros	Sébastien Côrriveau	467	0.9%	
Total valid votes		50,923	100.0%	
Total rejected ballots		607		
Turnout		51,530	%	

2006 Canadian federal election
Party	Candidate	Votes	%	±%
Bloc Québécois	Serge Cardin	27,185	52.2%	-6.5%
Conservative	Marc Nadeau	10,772	20.7%	+16.4%
Liberal	Robert Pouliot	6,860	13.2%	-17.8%
New Democratic	Martin Plaisance	4,645	8.9%	+6.0%
Green	Michel Quirion	2,262	4.3%	+1.3%
Independent	Claudia Laroche-Martel	321	0.6%	
Total valid votes		52,045	100.0%	

2004 Canadian federal election
Party	Candidate	Votes	%	±%
Bloc Québécois	Serge Cardin	29,323	58.7%	+12.2%
Liberal	Bruno-Marie Béchard	15,482	31.0%	-10.8%
Conservative	Réal Leblanc	2,142	4.3%	-4.1%
Green	Jeffrey Champagne	1,509	3.0%	
New Democratic	Philippe Dion	1,463	2.9%	1.6%
Total valid votes		49,919	100.0%	

Note: Conservative vote is compared to the total of the Canadian Alliance vote and Progressive Conservative vote in 2000 election.

2000 Canadian federal election: Sherbrooke
Party	Candidate	Votes	%	Expenditures
Bloc Québécois	Serge Cardin	23,559	46.53	$70,552
Liberal	Jean-François Rouleau	21,182	41.84	$69,566
Alliance	Mark Quinlan	2,284	4.51	$7,089
Progressive Conservative	Eric L'Heureux	1,955	3.86	$493
New Democratic	Craig Wright	677	1.34	none listed
Natural Law	Daniel Jolicoeur	495	0.98	none listed
Independent	Serge Bourassa-Lacombe	294	0.58	$624
Marxist–Leninist	Serge Lachapelle	186	0.37	$10
Total valid votes		50,632	100.00	
Total rejected ballots		1,248		
Turnout		51,880	63.58	
Electors on the lists		81,592		
Note: Canadian Alliance vote is compared to the Reform vote in 1998 by-election. Sources: Official Results, Elections Canada and Financial Returns, Elections Canada.

Canadian federal by-election, 14 September 1998
Party	Candidate	Votes	%	±%
Resignation of Jean J. Charest, 1 May 1998
Bloc Québécois	Serge Cardin	16,143	44.3%	+14.6%
Liberal	Robert Pouliot	15,923	43.7%	+35.0%
Progressive Conservative	Robert Archambault	2,303	6.3%	-53.2%
Reform	Marcel Bolduc	934	2.6%	
New Democratic	Sébastien Goulet	720	2.0%	+0.8%
Green	Jacques Bousquet	254	0.7%	
Independent	John Turmel	97	0.3%	
Marxist–Leninist	Serge Lachapelle	72	0.2%	
Total valid votes		36,446	100.0%	
