= Edward Towle Brooks =

Canadian politician (1830–1897)

The Honourable Edward Towle Brooks
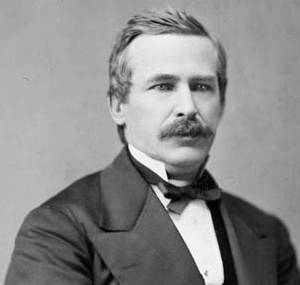

Member of the Canadian Parliament for Town of Sherbrooke
- In office 1872–1882
- Preceded by: Alexander Tilloch Galt
- Succeeded by: Robert Newton Hall

Personal details
- Born: July 6, 1830 Lennoxville, Lower Canada
- Died: August 5, 1897 (aged 67) Sherbrooke, Quebec, Canada
- Party: Conservative

Edward Towle Brooks, QC (July 6, 1830 – August 5, 1897) was a Canadian lawyer, judge, and political figure. He represented Town of Sherbrooke in the House of Commons of Canada from 1872 to 1882 as a Conservative member.

He was born in Lennoxville, Lower Canada, the son of Samuel Brooks and Elizabeth Towle. Brooks was educated at Dartmouth College, studied law with John Sewell Sanborn and was called to the bar in 1854. In 1856, he married Sarah Louise Clarke. Brooks was named Crown Prosecutor for St. Francis district in 1862. He was named Queen's Counsel in 1875. He was elected battonier for the St. Francis bar. Brooks was a trustee for Bishop's College School in Lennoxville. In 1882, he was named puisne judge in the Quebec Superior Court. Brooks retired from the bench in 1895 due to poor health. He died in Sherbrooke two years later.

== Electoral record ==
1872 Canadian federal election: Sherbrooke (Town of)
Party	Candidate	Votes
Conservative	Edward Towle Brooks	acclaimed
Source: Canadian Elections Database

1874 Canadian federal election: Town of Sherbrooke
Party	Candidate	Votes
Conservative	Edward Towle Brooks	acclaimed
Source: lop.parl.ca

1878 Canadian federal election: Town of Sherbrooke
Party	Candidate	Votes
Conservative	Edward Towle Brooks	acclaimed
