= Pierre-Luc Dusseault =

Canadian politician (born 1991)

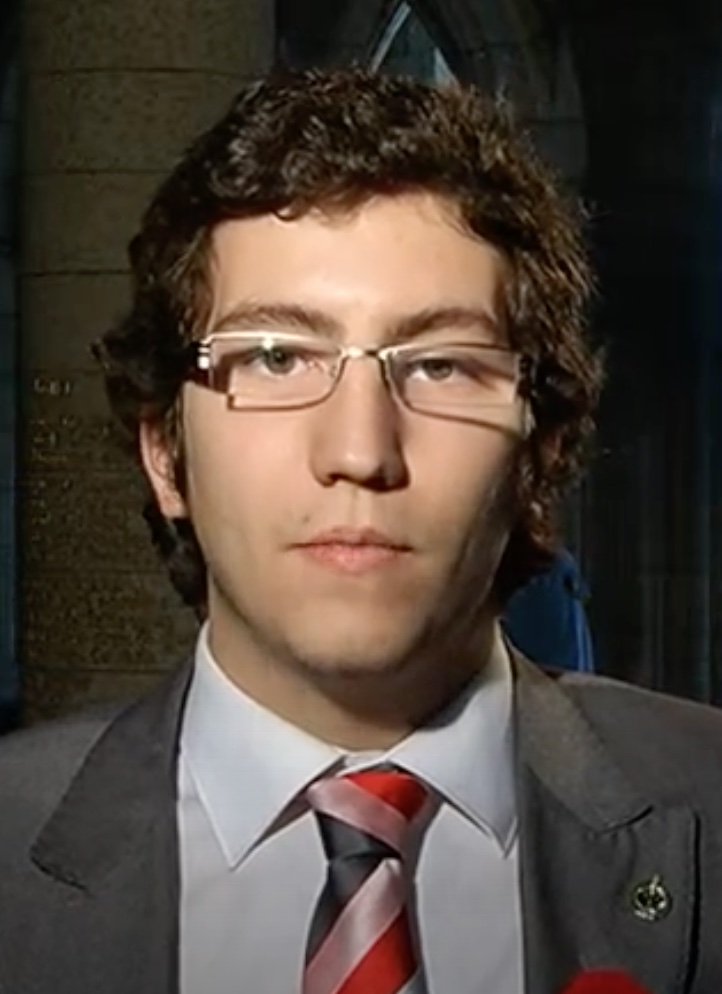
- Dusseault in 2011

Member of Parliament for Sherbrooke
- In office June 2, 2011 – October 21, 2019
- Preceded by: Serge Cardin
- Succeeded by: Élisabeth Brière

Chair of the Standing Committee on Access to Information, Privacy and Ethics
- In office April 24, 2012 – August 2, 2015
- Minister: Peter Penashue; Denis Lebel
- Preceded by: Jean Crowder
- Succeeded by: Blaine Calkins

Chair of the Standing Committee on Government Operations & Estimates
- In office October 24, 2013 – February 4, 2015
- Minister: Diane Finley
- Preceded by: Pat Martin
- Succeeded by: Pat Martin

Personal details
- Born: May 31, 1991 (age 35) Granby, Quebec, Canada
- Party: New Democratic Party; Sherbrooke Citoyen (municipal)
- Spouse: Joanie Boulet (m. 2013)
- Profession: Student

Pierre-Luc Dusseault (born May 31, 1991) is a Canadian politician who was elected to the House of Commons of Canada in the 2011 federal election at the age of 19, becoming the youngest member of Parliament (MP) in the country's history. He was re-elected in 2015 but lost his seat in the 2019 Canadian federal election.

== Early life and education ==
Born in Granby, Quebec, and educated in Magog, Dusseault is the son of a daycare administrator and a customer service manager. He received a DEC diploma in social studies from Cégep de Sherbrooke.

Dusseault was a first-year student studying applied politics at the Université de Sherbrooke at the time of his election as an MP. He was the co-founder and president of the university's student NDP club, having joined the NDP in 2009. He has told the press he would like to finish the degree once his political career is over.

== 2011 election ==
As a New Democratic Party candidate in the riding of Sherbrooke, Dusseault defeated the incumbent Bloc Québécois MP Serge Cardin (four decades Dusseault's elder), and was elected at the age of 19 years, 336 days, making him the youngest Canadian ever to be elected to the House of Commons, surpassing former Liberal Party MP Claude-André Lachance, who was aged 20 years, 94 days when elected in 1974. Dusseault turned 20 two days before the 41st Parliament was sworn in.

He was elected in the same election as five McGill University students, fellow NDP MPs Charmaine Borg, Matthew Dubé, Mylène Freeman, Laurin Liu, and Jamie Nicholls, following the NDP's unexpected mid-campaign surge in Quebec.

Dusseault voted for the first time in this election and had originally planned to work a summer job at a golf course but served in Parliament instead. In Parliament, he served as the chair of the access to information, privacy and ethics committee.

== 2015 election ==
Dusseault retained his seat at the 2015 general election, one of 17 NDP candidates elected in Quebec. He remained the youngest MP at the start of the 42nd Parliament.

== Quebec sovereignty ==
Three days after the 2011 election, Toronto radio host John Oakley conducted an interview with Dusseault, who drew himself into the debate on the Quebec sovereignty movement by stating, "Sovereignty will be done in Quebec. And Quebecers will decide if they want to be a country." He later clarified his remarks, saying that he was a federalist who respects sovereignty.

== Return to politics ==
On June 2, 2025, Dusseault announced that he would run for the Sherbrooke City Council in the Quatre-Saisons district.

== Personal life ==
Dusseault, a Francophone, stated that he would like to improve his English language skills while in Parliament.

== Electoral record ==
2019 Canadian federal election: Sherbrooke
Party	Candidate	Votes	%	±%	Expenditures
Liberal	Élisabeth Brière	17,490	29.3	-0.5	$41,211.61
New Democratic	Pierre-Luc Dusseault	16,881	28.3	-9.0	$34,349.81
Bloc Québécois	Claude Forgues	15,470	25.9	+5.4	
Conservative	Dany Sévigny	6,362	10.6	+1.2	
Green	Mathieu Morin	2,716	4.5	+3.3	$1,651.14
Independent	Edwin Moreno	471	0.8		
Rhinoceros	Steve Côté	219	0.4		
No affiliation	Hubert Richard	117	0.2		
Total valid votes/expense limit		59,726	100.0		
Total rejected ballots		1,003			
Turnout		60,729	68.3		
Eligible voters		88,936			
Liberal gain from New Democratic		Swing		+4.25	
Source: Elections Canada

2015 Canadian federal election
Party	Candidate	Votes	%	±%	Expenditures
New Democratic	Pierre-Luc Dusseault	21,374	37.33	-5.64	–
Liberal	Tom Allen	17,071	29.81	+20.32	–
Bloc Québécois	Caroline Bouchard	11,713	20.46	-15.51	–
Conservative	Marc Dauphin	5,391	9.42	+0.06	–
Green	Sophie Malouin	1,143	1.20	-0.51	–
Independent	Benoit Huberdeau	303	0.53	–	–
Rhinoceros	Hubert Richard	262	0.46	+0.03	–
Total valid votes/Expense limit		57,257	100.0		$226,355.78
Total rejected ballots		–	–	–	
Turnout		–	–	–	
Eligible voters		86,809			
New Democratic hold		Swing		-12.98	
Source: Elections Canada

2011 Canadian federal election
Party	Candidate	Votes	%	±%	Expenditures
New Democratic	Pierre-Luc Dusseault	22,344	42.97	+29.9	
Bloc Québécois	Serge Cardin	18,703	35.97	−14.1	
Liberal	Éric Deslauriers-Joannette	4,953	9.49	−10.0	
Conservative	Pierre Harvey	4,865	9.36	−5.0	
Green	Jacques Laberge	890	1.71	N/A	
Rhinoceros	Crédible Berlingot Landry	224	0.43	−0.5	
Total valid votes/Expense limit		51.999	100.0%		
New Democratic gain from Bloc Québécois		Swing		+22.0	

== See also ==
- Baby of the House, an unofficial title given to the youngest member of a parliamentary house
- Mhairi Black, the youngest British member of parliament since the Great Reform Act of 1832
- Alengot Oromait, Africa's youngest-ever member of parliament
- Wyatt Roy, the youngest-ever Australian member of parliament
