= Ernest-Omer Gingras =

Canadian politician

Member of Parliament for Richmond—Wolfe
- In office June 1949 – March 1958

Personal details
- Born: 18 February 1887 Saint-Camille, Quebec, Canada
- Died: 11 September 1983 (aged 96) Fleurimont, Quebec, Canada
- Party: Liberal
- Spouse(s): Aurore Dubois m. 20 Jun 1911
- Profession: clerk, merchant

Ernest-Omer Gingras (18 February 1887 – 11 September 1983) was a member of the Liberal Party in the House of Commons of Canada. He was born in Saint-Camille, Quebec and became a clerk and merchant by career. He was born in 1887, the son of François Gingras.

He served as mayor of Marbleton, Quebec for 20 years. Gingras entered federal politics when he won the Richmond—Wolfe riding in the 1949 general election. He was re-elected for successive terms in 1953 and 1957 then defeated in 1958 by Florent Dubois of the Progressive Conservative party.
