= Maurice Allard =

Canadian politician

- Official 1966 portrait

Member of Parliament for Sherbrooke
- In office 1958–1962
- Preceded by: Maurice Gingues
- Succeeded by: Gérard Chapdelaine
- In office 1965–1968
- Preceded by: Gérard Chapdelaine
- Succeeded by: Paul Mullins Gervais

Personal details
- Born: January 2, 1922 Sherbrooke, Quebec, Canada
- Died: September 14, 1988 (aged 66) Montreal, Quebec, Canada
- Party: Progressive Conservative 1958-1963
- Profession: lawyer law professor

Maurice Allard (January 2, 1922 – September 14, 1988) was a Canadian politician, as well as a law professor and a lawyer. Born in Sherbrooke, Quebec, he was elected in 1958 as a member of the Progressive Conservative Party representing the riding of Sherbrooke. He ran as an Independent Progressive Conservative and was defeated in the same riding in 1962. Allard quit the Progressive Conservative party in 1963 due to his opposition to party leader John Diefenbaker. He was elected in 1965 as an Independent Progressive Conservative and remained in the House of Commons as such until his resignation on March 6, 1968.
