= Sherbrooke (federal electoral district) =

Federal electoral district in Quebec, Canada

Coordinates: 45.4°N 71.9°W

Quebec electoral district
- Interactive map of riding boundaries from the 2025 federal election

Federal electoral district
- Legislature: House of Commons
MP
Élisabeth Brière
Liberal
- District created: 1924
- First contested: 1925
- Last contested: 2021
- District webpage: profile, map

Demographics
- Population (2011): 107,988
- Electors (2015): 86,809
- Area (km²): 105
- Pop. density (per km²): 1,028.5
- Census division: Sherbrooke
- Census subdivision: Sherbrooke (part)

Sherbrooke is a federal electoral district in Quebec, Canada, that has been represented in the House of Commons of Canada since 1925.

== Demographics ==
According to the 2021 Canadian census, 2023 representation order

Racial groups: 86.7% White, 4.0% Black, 2.2% Latin American, 2.1% Arab, 1.7% Indigenous, 1.4% West Asian
Languages: 87.8% French, 4.4% English, 2.3% Spanish, 1.7% Arabic
Religions: 60.9% Christian (52.9% Catholic, 8.0% Other), 4.8% Muslim, 33.2% None
Median income: $35,600 (2020)
Average income: $44,320 (2020)

== Geography ==
This riding in the south of the province is located in the Quebec region of Estrie. It consists of most of the city of Sherbrooke, other than certain areas to the north and south.

The riding is enclosed in its only neighbour, Compton—Stanstead.

== History ==
It was created in 1924 from parts of Town of Sherbrooke and Richmond—Arthabaska ridings.

It was one of the two seats to be won by the Progressive Conservatives in their washout in the 1993 federal election, won by former Cabinet minister and subsequent leader Jean Charest.

The 2012 electoral redistribution saw this riding gain and lose territory with Compton—Stanstead.

Following the 2022 Canadian federal electoral redistribution, the riding lost the Parc-Belvédère area to Compton—Stanstead.

=== Members of Parliament ===
This riding has elected the following members of the House of Commons of Canada:

Parliament	Years	Member	Party
Sherbrooke; Riding created from Town of Sherbrooke and Richmond—Arthabaska
15th	1925–1926	Charles Benjamin Howard	Liberal
16th	1926–1930	Charles Benjamin Howard	Liberal
17th	1930–1935	Charles Benjamin Howard	Liberal
18th	1935–1940	Charles Benjamin Howard	Liberal
19th	1940–1945	Maurice Gingues	Liberal
20th	1945–1949	Maurice Gingues	Liberal
21st	1949–1953	Maurice Gingues	Liberal
22nd	1953–1957	Maurice Gingues	Liberal
23rd	1957–1958	Maurice Gingues	Liberal
24th	1958–1962	Maurice Allard	Progressive Conservative
25th	1962–1963	Gérard Chapdelaine	Social Credit
26th	1963–1963	Gérard Chapdelaine	Social Credit
26th	1963–1965	Gérard Chapdelaine	Ralliement créditiste
27th	1965–1968	Maurice Allard	Independent Progressive Conservative
28th	1968–1972	Paul Mullins Gervais	Liberal
29th	1972–1974	Irénée Pelletier	Liberal
30th	1974–1979	Irénée Pelletier	Liberal
31st	1979–1980	Irénée Pelletier	Liberal
32nd	1980–1984	Irénée Pelletier	Liberal
33rd	1984–1988	Jean Charest	Progressive Conservative
34th	1988–1993	Jean Charest	Progressive Conservative
35th	1993–1997	Jean Charest	Progressive Conservative
36th	1997–1998	Jean Charest	Progressive Conservative
36th	1998–2000	Serge Cardin	Bloc Québécois
37th	2000–2004	Serge Cardin	Bloc Québécois
38th	2004–2006	Serge Cardin	Bloc Québécois
39th	2006–2008	Serge Cardin	Bloc Québécois
40th	2008–2011	Serge Cardin	Bloc Québécois
41st	2011–2015	Pierre-Luc Dusseault	New Democratic
42nd	2015–2019	Pierre-Luc Dusseault	New Democratic
43rd	2019–2021	Élisabeth Brière	Liberal
44th	2021–2025	Élisabeth Brière	Liberal
45th	2025–present	Élisabeth Brière	Liberal

== Election results ==
2025 Canadian federal election
Party	Candidate	Votes	%	±%
Liberal	Élisabeth Brière	31,249	51.29	+13.75
Bloc Québécois	Pierre-Étienne Rouillard	16,224	26.63	–2.38
Conservative	Esteban Méndez-Hord	7,983	13.10	+0.27
New Democratic	Jean-Pierre Fortier	3,516	5.77	–8.16
Green	Kevin McKenna	1,383	2.27	–0.60
People's	Alexandre Lépine	576	0.95	–1.52
Total valid votes/expense limit		60,931	98.63	
Total rejected ballots		845	1.37	-0.90
Turnout		61,776	67.80	+2.65
Eligible voters		91,110		
Liberal notional hold		Swing		+8.07
Source: Elections Canada

2021 federal election redistributed results
Party	Vote	%
Liberal	21,462	37.53
Bloc Québécois	16,588	29.01
New Democratic	7,964	13.93
Conservative	7,338	12.83
Green	1,643	2.87
People's	1,408	2.46
Free	585	0.99
Total valid votes	57,181	97.73
Rejected ballots	1,328	2.27
Registered voters/ estimated turnout	89,805	65.15

2021 Canadian federal election
Party	Candidate	Votes	%	±%	Expenditures
Liberal	Élisabeth Brière	21,830	37.5	+8.2	$49,489.03
Bloc Québécois	Ensaf Haidar	16,848	29.0	+3.1	$32,613.67
New Democratic	Marika Lalime	8,107	13.9	-14.4	$5,314.88
Conservative	Andrea Winters	7,490	12.9	+2.3	$8,864.11
Green	Marie-Clarisse Berger	1,670	2.9	-1.6	$0.00
People's	Marcela Niculescu	1,453	2.5	–	$0.00
Free	Maxime Boivin	787	1.4	–	$2.00
Total valid votes/expense limit		58,185	97.7	–	$119,070.42
Total rejected ballots		1,355	2.3		
Turnout		59,540	65.6		
Eligible voters		90,743			
Liberal hold		Swing		+2.6	
Source: Elections Canada

2019 Canadian federal election
Party	Candidate	Votes	%	±%	Expenditures
Liberal	Élisabeth Brière	17,490	29.3	-0.5	$41,211.61
New Democratic	Pierre-Luc Dusseault	16,881	28.3	-9.0	$34,349.81
Bloc Québécois	Claude Forgues	15,470	25.9	+5.4	
Conservative	Dany Sévigny	6,362	10.6	+1.2	
Green	Mathieu Morin	2,716	4.5	+3.3	$1,651.14
Independent	Edwin Moreno	471	0.8		
Rhinoceros	Steve Côté	219	0.4		
No affiliation	Hubert Richard	117	0.2		
Total valid votes/expense limit		59,726	100.0		
Total rejected ballots		1,003			
Turnout		60,729	68.3		
Eligible voters		88,936			
Liberal gain from New Democratic		Swing		+4.25	
Source: Elections Canada

2015 Canadian federal election
Party	Candidate	Votes	%	±%	Expenditures
New Democratic	Pierre-Luc Dusseault	21,374	37.33	-6.14	$48,702.98
Liberal	Tom Allen	17,071	29.81	+20.01	$72,978.48
Bloc Québécois	Caroline Bouchard	11,713	20.46	-15.51	$29,064.50
Conservative	Marc Dauphin	5,391	9.42	+0.22	$16,295.90
Green	Sophie Malouin	1,143	1.20	-0.55	–
Independent	Benoit Huberdeau	303	0.53	–	–
Rhinoceros	Hubert Richard	262	0.46	+0.03	–
Total valid votes/Expense limit		57,257	100.0		$227,049.95
Total rejected ballots		–	–	–	
Turnout		–	–	–	
Eligible voters		86,809			
New Democratic hold		Swing		-12.98	
Source: Elections Canada

2011 Canadian federal election
Party	Candidate	Votes	%	±%	Expenditures
New Democratic	Pierre-Luc Dusseault	22,344	42.97	+29.9	
Bloc Québécois	Serge Cardin	18,703	35.97	−14.1	
Liberal	Éric Deslauriers-Joannette	4,953	9.49	−10.0	
Conservative	Pierre Harvey	4,865	9.36	−5.0	
Green	Jacques Laberge	890	1.71	N/A	
Rhinoceros	Crédible Berlingot Landry	224	0.43	−0.5	
Total valid votes/Expense limit		51.999	100.0%		
New Democratic gain from Bloc Québécois		Swing		+22.0	

Source: Elections Canada

2008 Canadian federal election
Party	Candidate	Votes	%	±%	Expenditures
Bloc Québécois	Serge Cardin	25,502	50.1%	-2.2%	$63,527
Liberal	Nathalie Goguen	9,947	19.5%	+6.4%	$12,688
Conservative	André Bachand	8,331	16.4%	-4.3%	$46,261
New Democratic	Yves Mondoux	6,676	13.1%	+4.2%	$11,460
Rhinoceros	Sébastien Côrriveau	467	0.9%	–	$180
Total valid votes/Expense limit		50,923	100.0%	$86,493	
Total rejected ballots		607	1.2%		
Turnout		51,530	62.9%		

2006 Canadian federal election
Party	Candidate	Votes	%	±%	Expenditures
Bloc Québécois	Serge Cardin	27,185	52.2%	-6.5%	$64,825
Conservative	Marc Nadeau	10,772	20.7%	+16.4%	$68,472
Liberal	Robert Pouliot	6,860	13.2%	-17.8%	$32,821
New Democratic	Martin Plaisance	4,645	8.9%	+6.0%	$3,008
Green	Michel Quirion	2,262	4.3%	+1.3%	$242
Independent	Claudia Laroche-Martel	321	0.6%	–	$138
Total valid votes/Expense limit		52,045	100.0%	$81,158	

2004 Canadian federal election
Party	Candidate	Votes	%	±%	Expenditures
Bloc Québécois	Serge Cardin	29,323	58.7%	+12.2%	$77,448
Liberal	Bruno-Marie Béchard	15,482	31.0%	-10.8%	$77,885
Conservative	Réal Leblanc	2,142	4.3%	-4.1%	$6,431
Green	Jeffrey Champagne	1,509	3.0%	–	
New Democratic	Philippe Dion	1,463	2.9%	+1.6%	$2,785
Total valid votes/Expense limit		49,919	100.0%	$79,378	

Note: Conservative vote is compared to the total of the Canadian Alliance vote and Progressive Conservative vote in 2000 election.

2000 Canadian federal election
Party	Candidate	Votes	%	Expenditures
Bloc Québécois	Serge Cardin	23,559	46.53	$70,552
Liberal	Jean-François Rouleau	21,182	41.84	$69,566
Alliance	Mark Quinlan	2,284	4.51	$7,089
Progressive Conservative	Eric L'Heureux	1,955	3.86	$493
New Democratic	Craig Wright	677	1.34	none listed
Natural Law	Daniel Jolicoeur	495	0.98	none listed
Independent	Serge Bourassa-Lacombe	294	0.58	$624
Marxist–Leninist	Serge Lachapelle	186	0.37	$10
Total valid votes		50,632	100.00	
Total rejected ballots		1,248		
Turnout		51,880	63.58	
Electors on the lists		81,592		
Note: Canadian Alliance vote is compared to the Reform vote in 1998 by-election. Sources: Official Results, Elections Canada and Financial Returns, Elections Canada.

By-election on September 14, 1998 Resignation of Jean Charest, May 1, 1998
Party	Candidate	Votes	%	±%
Bloc Québécois	Serge Cardin	16,143	44.3%	+14.6%
Liberal	Robert Pouliot	15,923	43.7%	+35.0%
Progressive Conservative	Robert Archambault	2,303	6.3%	-53.2%
Reform	Marcel Bolduc	934	2.6%	
New Democratic	Sébastien Goulet	720	2.0%	+0.8%
Green	Jacques Bousquet	254	0.7%	
Independent	John Turmel	97	0.3%	
Marxist–Leninist	Serge Lachapelle	72	0.2%	
Total valid votes		36,446	100.0%	

1997 Canadian federal election
Party	Candidate	Votes	%	±%
Progressive Conservative	Jean Charest	32,228	59.5%	+7.2%
Bloc Québécois	Jacques Blanchette	16,086	29.7%	-8.2%
Liberal	Martin Bureau	4,720	8.7%	+0.8%
New Democratic	Tom Vouloumanos	628	1.2%	+0.4%
Natural Law	Christian Simard	477	0.9%	0.0%
Total valid votes		54,139	100.0%	

1993 Canadian federal election
Party	Candidate	Votes	%	±%
Progressive Conservative	Jean Charest	29,740	52.3%	−11.0%
Bloc Québécois	Guy Boutin	21,559	37.9%	
Liberal	Jean Paul Pelletier	4,462	7.9%	-14.7%
Natural Law	Serge Trépanier	516	0.9%	
New Democratic	Martine Caouette	445	0.8%	−10.9%
Abolitionist	Jean-Guy Trépanier	91	0.2%	
Total valid votes		56,813	100.0%	

1988 Canadian federal election
Party	Candidate	Votes	%	±%
Progressive Conservative	Jean Charest	34,538	63.3%	+11.8%
Liberal	Dennis Wood	12,314	22.6%	-11.2%
New Democratic	Alain Poirier	6,373	11.7%	+1.9%
Rhinoceros	Bébé Sept Heures Pierre Granger	1,040	1.9%	-0.5%
Independent	Normand Guy	148	0.3%	
Communist	Yves Lawler	143	0.3%	+0.1%
Total valid votes		54,556	100.0%	

1984 Canadian federal election
Party	Candidate	Votes	%	±%
Progressive Conservative	Jean Charest	22,232	51.5%	+42.2%
Liberal	Irénée Pelletier	14,607	33.8%	-38.0%
New Democratic	Daniel Berthold	4,230	9.8%	-0.2%
Rhinoceros	Gilbert Peupa Ash	1,054	2.4%	-1.3%
Parti nationaliste	Lorraine Déry	687	1.6%	
Social Credit	Fernand Bourret	197	0.5%	-3.7%
Communist	Yves Lawler	92	0.2%	–
Commonwealth of Canada	Françoise Chanteau	72	0.2%	
Total valid votes		43,171	100.0%	

1980 Canadian federal election
Party	Candidate	Votes	%	±%
Liberal	Irénée Pelletier	27,224	71.8%	+11.7%
New Democratic	Yves Dubois	3,777	10.0%	+7.2%
Progressive Conservative	Michel Beaudin	3,514	9.3%	+0.2%
Social Credit	Alphonse Ouellet	1,577	4.2%	-21.1%
Rhinoceros	Fernand Bédard	909	2.4%	
Rhinoceros	Viens Dorian Nadeau	492	1.3%	
Independent	Maurice Grenier	200	0.5%	
Union populaire	J. Gilles Marier	90	0.2%	0.0%
Communist	Yves Lawler	79	0.2%	-0.1%
Marxist–Leninist	Louis Davignon	60	0.2%	0.0%
Total valid votes		37,922	100.0%	

1979 Canadian federal election
Party	Candidate	Votes	%	±%
Liberal	Irénée Pelletier	25,110	60.1%	+3.7%
Social Credit	Jacques Blanchette	10,573	25.3%	-0.3%
Progressive Conservative	Yves Comtois	3,809	9.1%	-2.0%
New Democratic	Roger Muller	1,180	2.8%	-2.5%
Rhinoceros	Jeanne d'Arc Diane Ross	665	1.6%	
Independent	Alphonse Ouellet	148	0.4%	
Communist	Yves Lawler	111	0.3%	
Marxist–Leninist	Louis Davignon	88	0.2%	-0.6%
Union populaire	Michel English	63	0.2%	
Total valid votes		41,747	100.0%	

1974 Canadian federal election
Party	Candidate	Votes	%	±%
Liberal	Irénée Pelletier	23,903	56.4%	+13.2%
Social Credit	André G. Breton	10,864	25.6%	-8.1%
Progressive Conservative	Alex Kindy	4,716	11.1%	-3.0%
New Democratic	Hubert Wallot	2,238	5.3%	1.7%
Marxist–Leninist	Rita Viau	337	0.8%	
Independent	Charley Lamarre	336	0.8%	
Total valid votes		42,394	100.0%	

1972 Canadian federal election
Party	Candidate	Votes	%	±%
Liberal	Irénée Pelletier	20,569	43.2%	+3.0%
Social Credit	Maurice Couture	16,072	33.7%	-6.3%
Progressive Conservative	Alex Kindy	6,700	14.1%	-1.6%
New Democratic	Rebecca Augenfeld	1,713	3.6%	-0.5%
Independent	Gérard Gosselin	1,423	3.0%	
Independent	Jean Simoneau	911	1.9%	
Independent	J. Johnny Teasdale	259	0.5%	
Total valid votes		47,647	100.0%	

Note: Social Credit vote is compared to Ralliement créditiste vote in the 1968 election.

1968 Canadian federal election
Party	Candidate	Votes	%	±%
Liberal	Paul-M. Gervais	15,270	40.2%	6.7%
Ralliement créditiste	Adélard Larose	15,172	40.0%	+23.4%
Progressive Conservative	Alex Kindy	5,946	15.7%	+14.2%
New Democratic	Jean-Paul Blouin	1,563	4.1%	–
Total valid votes		37,951	100.0%	

1965 Canadian federal election
Party	Candidate	Votes	%	±%
Independent PC	Maurice Allard	11,808	35.5%	
Liberal	Roger Gingues	11,159	33.6%	-4.6%
Ralliement créditiste	Philippe Lord	5,522	16.6%	-23.5%
Independent	Gérard Chapdelaine	2,890	8.7%	
New Democratic	Louis-Philippe Brousseau	1,356	4.1%	+0.8%
Progressive Conservative	Étienne Pellerin	499	1.5%	-9.2%
Total valid votes		33,234	100.0%	

Note: Ralliement créditiste vote is compared to Social Credit vote in the 1963 election.

1963 Canadian federal election
Party	Candidate	Votes	%	±%
Social Credit	Gérard Chapdelaine	12,708	40.1%	-10.7%
Liberal	Sarto Roy	12,103	38.2%	+16.7%
Progressive Conservative	Roger Perreault	3,390	10.7%	-16.1%
Independent	Louis-Philippe Brousseau	2,469	7.8%	
New Democratic	Gustave Steenland	1,052	3.3%	+2.4%
Total valid votes		31,722	100.0%	

1962 Canadian federal election
Party	Candidate	Votes	%	±%
Social Credit	Gérard Chapdelaine	16,673	50.8%	+49.6%
Progressive Conservative	Maurice Allard	8,791	26.8%	-24.2%
Liberal	Fernand Joyal	7,066	21.5%	-26.4%
New Democratic	Gustave Steenland	311	0.9%	
Total valid votes		32,841	100.0%	

1958 Canadian federal election
Party	Candidate	Votes	%	±%
Progressive Conservative	Maurice Allard	15,383	51.0%	+13.5%
Liberal	Maurice Gingues	14,458	47.9%	-14.6%
Social Credit	Guillaume Racine	349	1.2%	
Total valid votes		30,190	100.0%	

1957 Canadian federal election
Party	Candidate	Votes	%	±%
Liberal	Maurice Gingues	16,324	62.5%	-3.7%
Progressive Conservative	François Thibault	9,791	37.5%	+3.7%
Total valid votes		26,115	100.0%	

1953 Canadian federal election
Party	Candidate	Votes	%	±%
Liberal	Maurice Gingues	15,827	66.2%	+17.0%
Progressive Conservative	Antonio-Joseph Pinard	8,085	33.8%	+7.3%
Total valid votes		23,912	100.0%	

1949 Canadian federal election
Party	Candidate	Votes	%	±%
Liberal	Maurice Gingues	12,116	49.2%	+8.8%
Progressive Conservative	William Redmond Hayes	6,522	26.5%	+0.4%
Independent Liberal	Alphonse Trudeau	3,060	12.4%	
Union des électeurs	Roméo Gauthier	2,728	11.1%	
Co-operative Commonwealth	Théode Bilodeau	217	0.9%	
Total valid votes		24,643	100.0%	

1945 Canadian federal election
Party	Candidate	Votes	%	±%
Liberal	Maurice Gingues	9,552	40.4%	-21.4%
Progressive Conservative	John Bassett, Jr.	6,158	26.0%	-3.1%
Bloc populaire	Valmore Olivier	3,427	14.5%	
Independent	Joseph-François-Xavier Labrecque	3,110	13.2%	
Social Credit	Roméo-Ernest Gauthier	1,118	4.7%	
Co-operative Commonwealth	Philippe Pépin	283	1.2%	
Total valid votes		23,648	100.0%	

Note: Progressive Conservative vote is compared to "National Government" vote in 1940

1940 Canadian federal election
Party	Candidate	Votes	%	±%
Liberal	Maurice Gingues	11,602	61.8%	+6.8%
National Government	Terence Gerard Walsh	5,465	29.1%	-15.9%
Independent	Joseph-Ernest Coté	1,697	9.0%	
Total valid votes		18,764	100.0%	

Note: "National Government" vote is compared to Conservative vote in 1935 election.

1935 Canadian federal election
Party	Candidate	Votes	%	±%
Liberal	Charles Benjamin Howard	9,806	55.0%	+3.5%
Conservative	William Warren Lynch	8,029	45.0%	-3.5%
Total valid votes		17,835	100.0%	

1930 Canadian federal election
Party	Candidate	Votes	%	±%
Liberal	Charles Benjamin Howard	8,546	51.5%	-10.5%
Conservative	Walter Harold Lynch	8,048	48.5%	10.5%
Total valid votes		16,594	100.0%	

1926 Canadian federal election
Party	Candidate	Votes	%	±%
Liberal	Charles Benjamin Howard	7,582	62.0%	+7.4%
Conservative	Albert Wyatt Reid	4,640	38.0%	-7.4%
Total valid votes		12,222	100.0%	

1925 Canadian federal election
Party	Candidate	Votes	%
Liberal	Charles Benjamin Howard	6,566	54.6%
Conservative	Edward Bruen Worthington	5,449	45.4%
Total valid votes		12,015	100.0%

== See also ==
- List of Canadian electoral districts
- Historical federal electoral districts of Canada
