= Samuel Brooks (politician) =

Canadian politician

Samuel Brooks (c. 1793 – March 22, 1849) was an American-born merchant and political figure in Lower Canada.

He was born in Haverhill, New Hampshire, the son of merchant Samuel Brooks. He set up business in Newbury, Vermont. He married Elizabeth Towle in 1813. Around 1820, he moved to Stanstead in Lower Canada, later moving to Lennoxville. He was a merchant there and also provided loans, raised livestock and acted as agent for the British American Land Company in the Eastern Townships. He later was a bank manager at Sherbrooke and president of the Stanstead and Sherbrooke Mutual Fire Insurance Company. Brooks was also involved in the development of railroads in the region with Alexander Tilloch Galt.

He served in the local militia and as justice of the peace. Brooks was elected to represent Sherbrooke in the Legislative Assembly of Lower Canada in 1829 and was reelected in 1830. He was forced to resign in 1831 because he was not a British subject. He was elected to represent Sherbrooke in the Legislative Assembly of the Province of Canada in 1844 and was reelected in 1848. He died in office in Montreal in 1849.

His son Edward Towle served in the Canadian House of Commons. His daughter Eleanor Hall married John Sewell Sanborn, who served in the Senate of Canada.
