= Brompton, Quebec =

Coordinates: 45°28′N 71°56′W

Brompton
- Borough
- Borough of Sherbrooke
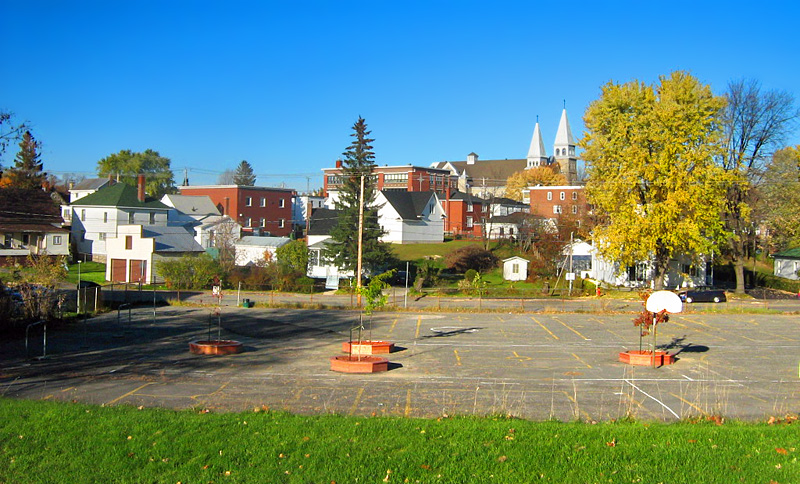

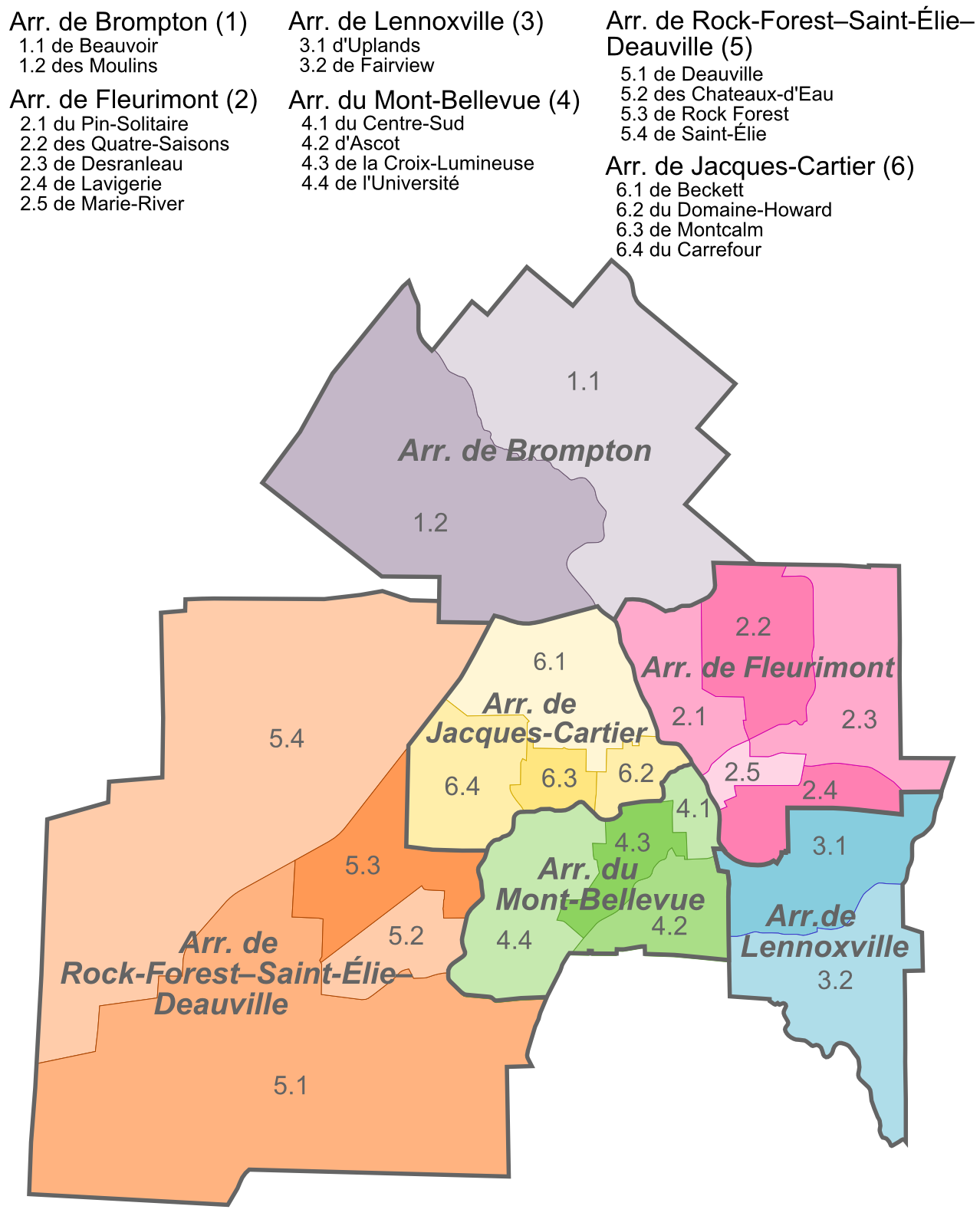
- Country: Canada
- Province: Quebec
- Region: Estrie
- RCM: Sherbrooke
- Merged: January 1, 2002

Government
  - City councillor: Nicole Bergeron
  - Borough councillors: Benoît Dionne; Kathleen Gélinas

Area
  - Land: 75 km^{2} (29 sq mi)

Population (2009)
  - Total: 6,314
  - Density: 84.18/km^{2} (218.0/sq mi)
- Time zone: UTC-5 (EST)
- Area code: 819
- Website: Borough of Brompton

Brompton is a borough of the city of Sherbrooke, Quebec. The borough comprises the former city of Bromptonville, which was amalgamated into the city of Sherbrooke on January 1, 2002. Prior to December 30, 1998, "Brompton" referred to a township municipality which occupied some of the territory of the modern-day borough of Brompton.

Prior to June 12, 1996, the township municipality of Brompton and the city of Bromptonville were part of Le Val-Saint-François Regional County Municipality; on that date they both transferred to Sherbrooke Regional County Municipality (as it was then called). On December 30, 1998, the township municipality of Brompton merged into the city of Bromptonville. On January 1, 2002, the by-now-renamed La Région-Sherbrookoise Regional County Municipality became defunct when nearly all of it was merged into the expanded city of Sherbrooke; the city of Bromptonville became the borough of Brompton.

As an independent municipality, Bromptonville had a population of 5,571 in the Canada 2001 Census. As a borough of Sherbrooke, Brompton had a population of 6,314 in 2009.

== Government ==
The borough is represented by one councillor on the Sherbrooke City Council, and two councillors who serve on the local borough council but not on the full city council. Its current city councillor is Nicole Bergeron, and its borough councillors are Benoît Dionne and Michel Lamontagne.

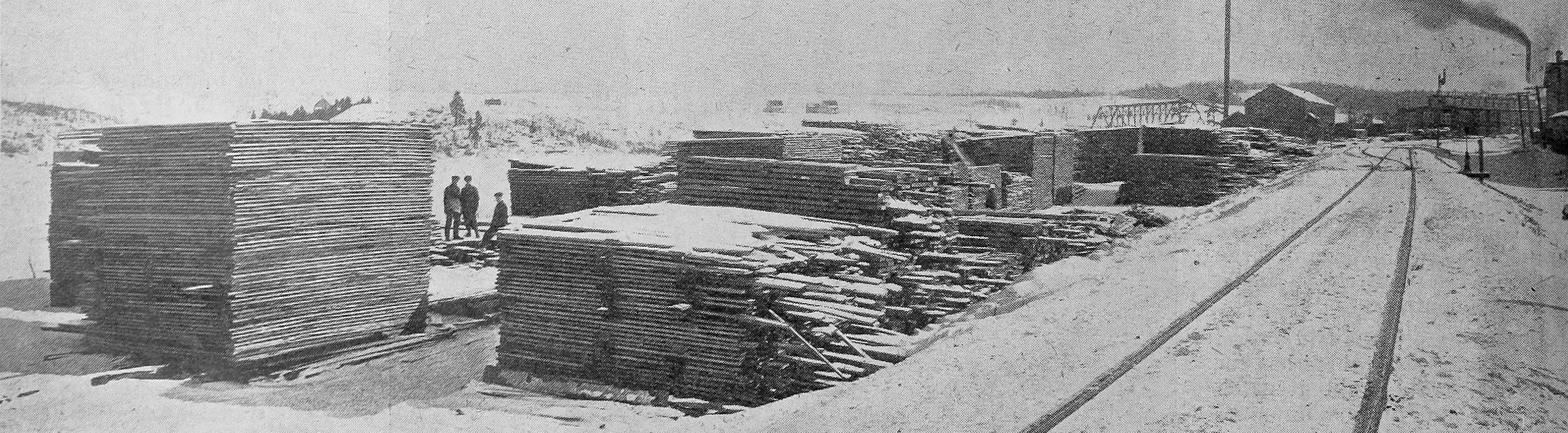
Hardwood lumber yard in Bromptonville, 1921

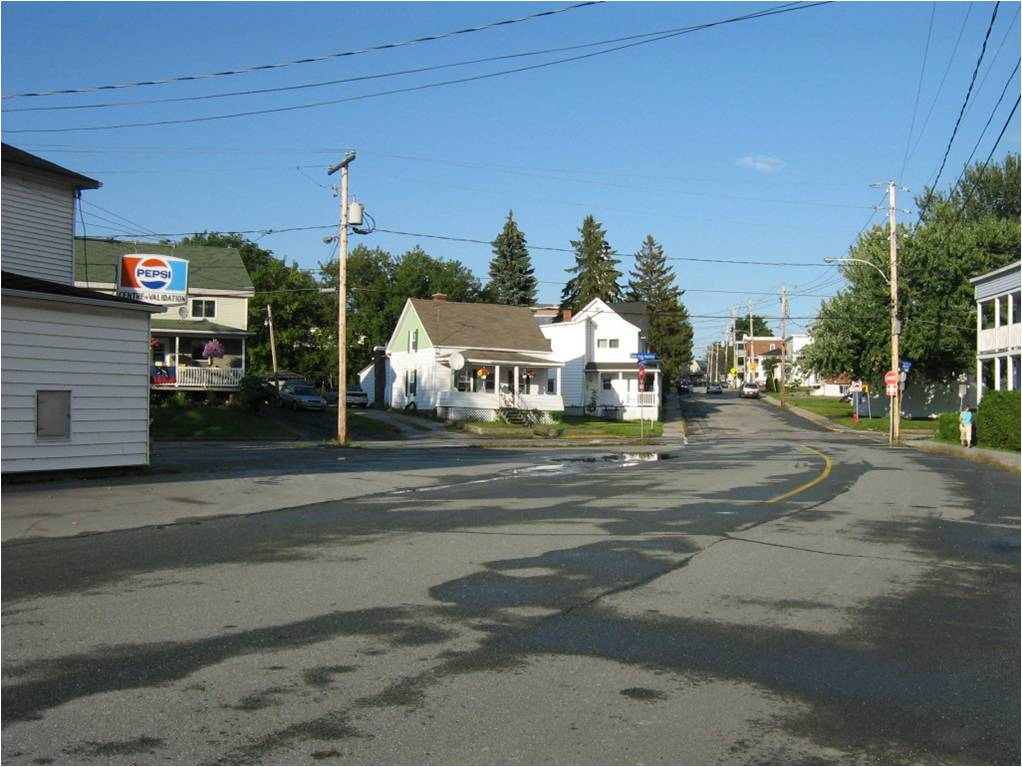
Brompton
