= Canadian federal election results in the Eastern Townships =

Electoral history
Year	Results
2021	
2019	
2015	
2011	
2008	
2006	
2004	
2000	
1997	
1993	
1988	
1984	
1980	
1979	
1974	
1972	
1968	
1965	
1963	
1962	
1958	
1957	
1953	
1949	
1945	
1940	
1935	
1930	
1926	
1925	
1921	
1917	
1911	
1908	
1904	
1900	
1896	

Canadian federal elections have provided the following results in the Eastern Townships.

== Regional profile ==
In 1988 and 1984 this area was nearly swept by the Progressive Conservatives under Brian Mulroney, winning all but one seat in 1988 (Shefford) and two in 1984 (Shefford and Richmond-Wolfe). Previously, the Tories only had one riding won in either 1979 or 1980, and that was in Missisquoi in 1979. The Social Credit party also won a seat here in 1979, in Beauce.

By the following election in 1993, Mulroney had left office and support for the Tories all across Quebec moved to the Bloc Québécois. Locally, the Bloc won all but two seats; the exceptions were in Beauce, which was won by former Conservative Gilles Bernier who ran as an independent, and in Sherbrooke, where Jean Charest was one of only two PC candidates to win in all of Canada.

By 1997, Charest was PC leader and local candidates running on his coattails did well, resulting in a split between the Progressive Conservatives (four seats) the Bloc Québécois (three seats) and the Liberals (two seats). However, in 1998, Charest moved to provincial politics as leader of the Quebec Liberal Party (which is independent of the federal Liberals, despite the similarity of names), and without him local support for the PCs declined.

By the 2000 election two of the PC members, David Price and Diane St-Jacques, had left the party and joined the federal Liberals. André Bachand remained with the PCs in 2000 and was re-elected, but declined to join the newly merged Conservatives and retired from politics in 2004. Traditional Bloc support in this region is concentrated in the northwest part, and in the Frontenac-Megantic region. Nonetheless, Bloc support weakened across the board here in 2006, primarily to the Conservatives.

In 2011, the New Democratic surge cost the Bloc six of its seven seats in the region; the two Conservatives retained their seats. Four years later, the Conservatives picked up a seat at the expense of the Bloc while Liberal support climbed enough for them to steal three seats from the New Democrats.

In 2019, the Bloc regained popularity and the NDP was wiped out of the region with 2 losses to the Bloc and one to the Liberals.

=== Votes by party throughout time ===
Election	Liberal	Conservative	New Democratic	Bloc Québécois	Green	PC	Reform / Alliance	Social Credit	Others
1979	180,096; 49.5%	—	7,194; 2.0%	—	—	71,426; 19.6%	—	92,750; 25.5%	12,393; 3.4%
1980	212,965; 61.5%	—	18,891; 5.5%	—	—	68,504; 19.8%	—	36,900; 10.7%	9,131; 2.6%
1984	151,983; 39.5%	—	21,502; 5.6%	—	454; 0.1%	206,403; 53.6%	—	1,170; 0.3%	3,664; 1.0%
1988	130,657; 32.2%	—	39,504; 9.7%	—	511; 0.1%	232,274; 57.3%	—	—	2,671; 0.7%
1993	93,199; 22.8%	—	4,736; 1.2%	196,524; 48.2%	379; 0.1%	87,472; 21.4%	No candidate	—	25,806; 6.3%
1997	112,671; 26.9%	—	5,405; 1.3%	144,928; 34.7%	No candidate	153,067; 36.6%	No candidate	—	2,124; 0.5%
2000	165,281; 41.5%	—	4,221; 1.1%	162,525; 40.8%	No candidate	41,423; 10.4%	21,104; 5.3%	—	3,954; 1.0%
2004	136,896; 33.2%	45,646; 11.1%	11,777; 2.9%	205,380; 49.8%	12,748; 3.1%	Merged into Conservative Party		—	No candidate
2006	70,492; 15.7%	144,889; 32.2%	24,356; 5.4%	190,469; 42.3%	17,820; 4.0%	Merged into Conservative Party		—	2,236; 0.5%
2008	80,460; 18.3%	126,357; 28.7%	50,229; 11.4%	168,716; 38.3%	13,558; 3.1%	Merged into Conservative Party		—	1,347; 0.3%
2011	46,504; 10.1%	102,468; 22.3%	192,809; 42.0%	107,742; 23.5%	8,863; 1.9%	Merged into Conservative Party		—	483; 0.1%
2015	155,340; 31.1%	113,105; 22.7%	126,491; 25.4%	91,724; 18.4%	10,488; 2.1%	Merged into Conservative Party		—	1,732; 0.3%
2019	129,958; 25.2%	119,950; 23.2%	56,740; 11.0%	163,611; 31.7%	21,615; 4.2%	Merged into Conservative Party		—	24,756; 4.8%
2021	128,008; 25.5%	133,265; 26.6%	36,787; 7.3%	161,960; 32.3%	6,896; 1.4%	Merged into Conservative Party		—	34,949; 7.0%
2025	202,205; 36.0%	164,881; 29.3%	16,102; 2.9%	164,617; 29.3%	4,472; 0.8%	Merged into Conservative Party		—N/a	9,863; 1.8%

Election statistics in the Eastern Townships

Liberal
Conservative
New Democratic
Bloc Québécois
Green
Social Credit (defunct)
Alliance (defunct)
Progressive Conservative (defunct)

== Detailed results ==
=== 2021 ===
Electoral district	Candidates								Incumbent
Electoral district	Liberal	Conservative	BQ	NDP	Green	PPC	FPC	Other	Incumbent
Beauce	Philippe-Alexandre Langlois; 7,018; 12.32%	Richard Lehoux; 27,514; 48.29%	Solange Thibodeau; 8,644; 15.17%	François Jacques-Côté; 1,654; 2.90%	Andrzej Wisniowski; 486; 0.85%	Maxime Bernier; 10,362; 18.19%	Chantale Giguère; 1,096; 1.92%	Sébastien Tanguay (Mar.); 206; 0.36%	Richard Lehoux
Brome—Missisquoi (judicial recount terminated)	Pascale St-Onge; 21,488; 34.96%	Vincent Duhamel; 9,961; 16.20%	Marilou Alarie; 21,291; 34.64%	Andrew Panton; 3,828; 6.23%	Michelle Corcos; 1,466; 2.38%	Alexis Stogowski; 1,982; 3.22%	Maryse Richard; 961; 1.56%	Lawrence Cotton (VCP); 216 0.35%	Lyne Bessette$
Brome—Missisquoi (judicial recount terminated)	Pascale St-Onge; 21,488; 34.96%	Vincent Duhamel; 9,961; 16.20%	Marilou Alarie; 21,291; 34.64%	Andrew Panton; 3,828; 6.23%	Michelle Corcos; 1,466; 2.38%	Alexis Stogowski; 1,982; 3.22%	Maryse Richard; 961; 1.56%	Dany Desjardins (Ind.); 145 0.24%	Lyne Bessette$
Brome—Missisquoi (judicial recount terminated)	Pascale St-Onge; 21,488; 34.96%	Vincent Duhamel; 9,961; 16.20%	Marilou Alarie; 21,291; 34.64%	Andrew Panton; 3,828; 6.23%	Michelle Corcos; 1,466; 2.38%	Alexis Stogowski; 1,982; 3.22%	Maryse Richard; 961; 1.56%	Susanne Lefebvre (CHP); 133 0.22%	Lyne Bessette$
Compton—Stanstead	Marie-Claude Bibeau; 21,188; 36.66%	Pierre Tremblay; 10,087; 17.45%	Nathalie Bresse; 17,681; 30.59%	Geneva Allen; 4,288; 7.42%	Sylvain Dodier; 1,623; 2.81%	Yves Bourassa; 2,167; 3.75%	Déitane Gendron; 576; 1.00%	Sylvain Longpré (Ind.); 186; 0.32%	Marie-Claude Bibeau
Drummond	Mustapha Berri; 9,614; 18.78%	Nathalie Clermont; 9,179; 17.93%	Martin Champoux; 23,866; 46.62%	François Choquette; 5,709; 11.15%			Josée Joyal; 1,728; 3.38%	Sylvain Marcoux (NA); 419 0.82%	Martin Champoux
Drummond	Mustapha Berri; 9,614; 18.78%	Nathalie Clermont; 9,179; 17.93%	Martin Champoux; 23,866; 46.62%	François Choquette; 5,709; 11.15%			Josée Joyal; 1,728; 3.38%	Lucas Munger (Animal); 674 1.32%	Martin Champoux
Mégantic—L'Érable	Adam Lukofsky; 6,329; 13.63%	Luc Berthold; 26,121; 56.26%	Éric Labonté; 9,318; 20.07%	Mathieu Boisvert; 1,308; 2.82%	Emilie Hamel; 592; 1.28%	Jonathan Gagnon; 1,677; 3.61%	Real Pepin; 680; 1.46%	Gloriane Blais (Ind.); 403; 0.87%	Luc Berthold
Richmond—Arthabaska	Alexandre Desmarais; 8,543; 14.95%	Alain Rayes; 28,513; 49.88%	Diego Scalzo; 14,150; 24.76%	Nataël Bureau; 2,550; 4.46%		Nadine Fougeron; 2,058; 3.60%	Louis Richard; 897; 1.57%	Marjolaine Delisle (Rhino.); 448; 0.78%	Alain Rayes
Saint-Hyacinthe—Bagot	Caroline-Joan Boucher; 12,030; 22.68%	André Lepage; 7,166; 13.51%	Simon-Pierre Savard-Tremblay; 25,165; 47.45%	Brigitte Sansoucy; 6,170; 11.63%		Sylvain Pariseau; 1,445; 2.72%	Sébastien Desautels; 1,055; 1.99%		Simon-Pierre Savard-Tremblay
Shefford	Pierre Breton; 19,968; 33.49%	Céline Lalancette; 7,234; 12.13%	Andréanne Larouche; 24,997; 41.92%	Patrick Jasmin; 3,173; 5.32%	Mathieu Morin; 1,059; 1.78%	Gerda Schieder; 2,073; 3.48%	Joël Lacroix; 599; 1.00%	Jean-Philippe Beaudry-Graham (PIQ); 239 0.40%	Andréanne Larouche
Shefford	Pierre Breton; 19,968; 33.49%	Céline Lalancette; 7,234; 12.13%	Andréanne Larouche; 24,997; 41.92%	Patrick Jasmin; 3,173; 5.32%	Mathieu Morin; 1,059; 1.78%	Gerda Schieder; 2,073; 3.48%	Joël Lacroix; 599; 1.00%	Yannick Brisebois (Mar.); 284 0.48%	Andréanne Larouche
Sherbrooke	Élisabeth Brière; 21,830; 37.52%	Andrea Winters; 7,490; 12.87%	Ensaf Haidar; 16,848; 28.96%	Marika Lalime; 8,107; 13.93%	Marie-Clarisse Berger; 1,670; 2.87%	Marcela Niculescu; 1,453; 2.50%	Maxime Boivin; 787; 1.35%		Élisabeth Brière

=== 2019 ===
Electoral district	Candidates								Incumbent
Electoral district	Liberal	Conservative	BQ	NDP	Green	PPC	Rhinoceros	Other	Incumbent
Beauce	Adam Veilleux; 6,971; 11.73%	Richard Lehoux; 22,860; 38.47%	Guillaume Rodrigue; 8,410; 14.15%	François Jacques-Côté; 1,847; 3.11%	Josiane Fortin; 1,461; 2.46%	Maxime Bernier; 16,796; 28.26%	Maxime Bernier; 1,084; 1.82%		Maxime Bernier
Brome—Missisquoi	Lyne Bessette; 23,450; 38.17%	Bruno Côté; 7,697; 12.53%	Monique Allard; 21,152; 34.43%	Sylvie Jetté; 4,887; 7.95%	Normand Dallaire; 3,302; 5.37%	François Poulin; 456; 0.74%	Steeve Cloutier; 310; 0.50%	Lawrence Cotton (VCP); 187; 0.30%	Denis Paradis†$
Compton—Stanstead	Marie-Claude Bibeau; 21,731; 37.31%	Jessy Mc Neil; 8,446; 14.50%	David Benoît; 18,571; 31.89%	Naomie Mathieu Chauvette; 5,607; 9.63%	Jean Rousseau; 3,044; 5.23%	Paul Reed; 586; 1.01%	Jonathan Therrien; 252; 0.43%		Marie-Claude Bibeau
Drummond	William Morales; 9,552; 17.42%	Jessica Ebacher; 9,083; 16.57%	Martin Champoux; 24,574; 44.82%	François Choquette; 8,716; 15.90%	Frédérik Bernier; 1,856; 3.39%	Steeve Paquet; 525; 0.96%	Réal Batrhino; 270; 0.49%	Lucas Munger (Animal); 248; 0.45%	François Choquette
Mégantic—L'Érable	Isabelle Grégoire; 7,388; 15.55%	Luc Berthold; 23,392; 49.24%	Priscilla Corbeil; 12,249; 25.78%	Mathieu Boisvert; 1,936; 4.08%	Nicole Charette; 1,258; 2.65%	Marie Claude Lauzier; 812; 1.71%	Damien Roy; 256; 0.54%	Jean Paradis (Ind.); 217; 0.46%	Luc Berthold
Richmond—Arthabaska	Marc Patry; 8,868; 15.12%	Alain Rayes; 26,553; 45.28%	Olivier Nolin; 16,539; 28.21%	Olivier Guérin; 2,864; 4.88%	Laura Horth-Lepage; 3,133; 5.34%	Jean Landry; 681; 1.16%			Alain Rayes
Saint-Hyacinthe—Bagot	René Vincelette; 11,903; 21.29%	Bernard Barré; 8,062; 14.42%	Simon-Pierre Savard-Tremblay; 23,143; 41.39%	Brigitte Sansoucy; 10,297; 18.42%	Sabrina Huet-Côté; 2,031; 3.63%	Jean-François Bélanger; 478; 0.85%			Brigitte Sansoucy
Shefford	Pierre Breton; 22,605; 37.11%	Nathalie Clermont; 7,495; 12.30%	Andréanne Larouche; 23,503; 38.58%	Raymonde Plamondon; 3,705; 6.08%	Katherine Turgeon; 2,814; 4.62%	Mariam Sabbagh; 497; 0.82%		Darlène Daviault (PIQ); 294; 0.48%	Pierre Breton
Sherbrooke	Élisabeth Brière; 17,490; 29.28%	Dany Sévigny; 6,362; 10.65%	Claude Forgues; 15,470; 25.90%	Pierre-Luc Dusseault; 16,881; 28.26%	Mathieu Morin; 2,716; 4.55%		Steve Côté; 219; 0.37%	Edwin Moreno (Ind.); 471; 0.79% Hubert Richard (NA); 117; 0.20%	Pierre-Luc Dusseault

=== 2015 ===
Electoral district	Candidates						Incumbent
Electoral district	Conservative	NDP	Liberal	BQ	Green	Other	Incumbent
Beauce	Maxime Bernier; 32,910; 58.89%	Daniel Royer; 5,443; 9.74%	Adam Veilleux; 12,442; 22.26%	Stéphane Trudel; 4,144; 7.42%	Céline Brown MacDonald; 943; 1.69%		Maxime Bernier
Brome—Missisquoi	Charles Poulin; 6,724; 11.46%	Catherine Lusson; 14,383; 24.51%	Denis Paradis; 25,744; 43.88%	Patrick Melchior; 10,252; 17.47%	Cindy Moynan; 1,377; 2.35%	Patrick Paine (SD); 195; 0.33%	Pierre Jacob†
Compton—Stanstead	Gustavo Labrador; 6,978; 12.50%	Jean Rousseau; 15,300; 27.41%	Marie-Claude Bibeau; 20,582; 36.88%	France Bonsant; 11,551; 20.70%	Korie Marshall; 1,085; 1.94%	Kévin Côté (Rhino.); 315; 0.56%	Jean Rousseau
Drummond	Pascale Déry; 9,221; 17.74%	François Choquette; 15,833; 30.46%	Pierre Côté; 13,793; 26.54%	Diane Bourgeois; 11,862; 22.82%	Émile Coderre; 1,270; 2.44%		François Choquette
Mégantic—L'Érable	Luc Berthold; 16,749; 35.42%	Jean-François Delisle; 10,386; 21.96%	David Berthiaume; 13,308; 28.14%	Virginie Provost; 5,838; 12.35%	Justin Gervais; 1,006; 2.13%		Christian Paradis†
Richmond—Arthabaska	Alain Rayes; 18,505; 31.57%	Myriam Beaulieu; 14,213; 24.25%	Marc Desmarais; 14,463; 24.67%	Olivier Nolin; 10,068; 17.18%	Laurier Busque; 984; 1.68%	Antoine Dubois (Rhino.); 384; 0.66%	André Bellavance†
Saint-Hyacinthe—Bagot	Réjean Léveillé; 9,098; 16.73%	Brigitte Sansoucy; 15,578; 28.65%	René Vincelette; 14,980; 27.55%	Michel Filion; 13,200; 24.28%	Lise Durand; 1,243; 2.29%	Ugo Ménard (Ind.); 270; 0.50%	Marie-Claude Morin†
Shefford	Sylvie Fontaine; 7,529; 12.78%	Claire Mailhot; 13,945; 23.67%	Pierre Breton; 22,957; 38.96%	Jocelyn Beaudoin; 13,092; 22.22%	Simon McMillan; 1,397; 2.37%		Réjean Genest†
Sherbrooke	Marc Dauphin; 5,391; 9.41%	Pierre-Luc Dusseault; 21,410; 37.36%	Thomas "Tom" Allen; 17,071; 29.79%	Caroline Bouchard; 11,717; 20.45%	Sophie Malouin; 1,143; 1.99%	Benoit Huberdeau (Ind.); 303 0.53%	Pierre-Luc Dusseault
Sherbrooke	Marc Dauphin; 5,391; 9.41%	Pierre-Luc Dusseault; 21,410; 37.36%	Thomas "Tom" Allen; 17,071; 29.79%	Caroline Bouchard; 11,717; 20.45%	Sophie Malouin; 1,143; 1.99%	Hubert Richard (Rhino.); 265 0.46%	Pierre-Luc Dusseault

=== 2011 ===
Electoral district	Candidates						Incumbent
Electoral district	BQ	Conservative	Liberal	NDP	Green	Other	Incumbent
Beauce	Sylvio Morin; 3,535; 6.69%	Maxime Bernier; 26,799; 50.71%	Claude Morin; 5,833; 11.04%	Serge Bergeron; 15,831; 29.95%	Etienne Doyon Lessard; 852; 1.61%		Maxime Bernier
Brome—Missisquoi	Christelle Bogosta; 11,173; 21.26%	Nolan LeBlanc-Bauerle; 6,256; 11.91%	Denis Paradis; 11,589; 22.06%	Pierre Jacob; 22,407; 42.64%	Benoit Lambert; 1,120; 2.13%		Christian Ouellet†
Compton—Stanstead	France Bonsant; 13,179; 26.03%	Sandrine Gressard Bélanger; 5,982; 11.81%	William Hogg; 6,132; 12.11%	Jean Rousseau; 24,097; 47.59%	Gary Caldwell; 1,241; 2.45%		France Bonsant
Drummond	Roger Pomerleau; 10,410; 21.95%	Normand W. Bernier; 7,555; 15.93%	Pierre Côté; 3,979; 8.39%	François Choquette; 24,489; 51.64%	Robin Fortin; 987; 2.08%		Roger Pomerleau
Mégantic—L'Érable	Pierre Turcotte; 7,481; 16.76%	Christian Paradis; 21,931; 49.14%	René Roy; 2,601; 5.83%	Cheryl Voisine; 11,716; 26.25%	Wyatt Tessari; 655; 1.47%	Alain Bergeron (CAP); 250; 0.56%	Christian Paradis
Richmond—Arthabaska	André Bellavance; 18,033; 33.83%	Jean-Philippe Bachand; 13,145; 24.66%	Marie-Josée Talbot; 3,711; 6.96%	Isabelle Maguire; 17,316; 32.49%	Tomy Bombardier; 1,098; 2.06%		André Bellavance
Saint-Hyacinthe—Bagot	Ève-Mary Thaï Thi Lac; 12,651; 24.57%	Jean-Guy Dagenais; 8,108; 15.74%	Denis Vallée; 2,784; 5.41%	Marie-Claude Morin; 26,963; 52.36%	Johany Beaudoin-Bussières; 994; 1.93%		Ève-Mary Thaï Thi Lac
Shefford	Robert Vincent; 12,615; 23.37%	Mélisa Leclerc; 7,908; 14.65%	Bernard Demers; 4,855; 8.99%	Réjean Genest; 27,575; 51.09%	Patrick Daoust; 1,022; 1.89%		Robert Vincent
Sherbrooke	Serge Cardin; 18,665; 35.89%	Pierre Harvey; 4,784; 9.20%	Éric Deslauriers; 5,020; 9.65%	Pierre-Luc Dusseault; 22,415; 43.10%	Jacques Laberge; 894; 1.72%	Crédible Berlingot Landry (Rhino); 233; 0.45%	Serge Cardin

=== 2008 ===
Electoral district	Candidates						Incumbent
Electoral district	BQ	Conservative	Liberal	NDP	Green	Other	Incumbent
Beauce	André Côté; 7,143; 13.98%	Maxime Bernier; 31,883; 62.41%	René Roy; 5,270; 10.32%	Véronique Poulin; 4,352; 8.52%	Nicolas Rochette; 2,436; 4.77%		Maxime Bernier
Brome—Missisquoi	Christian Ouellet; 17,561; 35.21%	Mark Quinlan; 9,309; 18.66%	Denis Paradis; 16,357; 32.79%	Christelle Bogosta; 4,514; 9.05%	Pierre Brassard; 1,784; 3.58%	David Marler (Ind.); 354; 0.71%	Christian Ouellet
Compton—Stanstead	France Bonsant; 20,332; 41.86%	Michel Gagné; 9,445; 19.44%	William Hogg; 10,946; 22.53%	Jean Rousseau; 5,483; 11.29%	Gary Caldwell; 2,368; 4.88%		France Bonsant
Drummond	Roger Pomerleau; 17,613; 38.79%	André Komlosy; 11,490; 25.31%	Jean Courchesne; 7,697; 16.95%	Annick Corriveau; 7,460; 16.43%	Réginald Gagnon; 1,144; 2.52%		Pauline Picard†
Mégantic—L'Érable	Pierre Turcotte; 12,283; 27.72%	Christian Paradis; 20,697; 46.70%	Nicole Champagne; 6,185; 13.96%	Bruno Vézina; 4,191; 9.46%	Jean-R. Guernon; 959; 2.16%		Christian Paradis
Richmond—Arthabaska	André Bellavance; 23,913; 46.02%	Éric Lefebvre; 15,080; 29.02%	Gwyneth Helen Grant; 6,599; 12.70%	Stéphane Ricard; 4,509; 8.68%	François Fillion; 1,337; 2.57%	Jean Landry (Ind.); 526; 1.01%	André Bellavance
Saint-Hyacinthe—Bagot	Ève-Mary Thaï Thi Lac; 22,719; 47.36%	René Vincelette; 10,195; 21.25%	Denise Tremblay; 6,649; 13.86%	Brigitte Sansoucy; 6,721; 14.01%	Jacques Tétreault; 1,682; 3.51%		Ève-Mary Thaï Thi Lac
Shefford	Robert Vincent; 21,650; 42.82%	Jean Lambert; 9,927; 19.63%	Bernard Demers; 10,810; 21.38%	Simon Gnocchini Messier; 6,323; 12.51%	Michel.M. Champagne; 1,848; 3.66%		Robert Vincent
Sherbrooke	Serge Cardin; 25,502; 50.08%	André Bachand; 8,331; 16.36%	Nathalie Goguen; 9,947; 19.53%	Yves Mondoux; 6,676; 13.11%		Sébastien Côrriveau (Rhino.); 467; 0.92%	Serge Cardin

=== 2006 ===
Electoral district	Candidates						Incumbent
Electoral district	BQ	Liberal	Conservative	NDP	Green	Other	Incumbent
Beauce	Patrice Moore; 10,997; 19.97%	Jacques Lussier; 4,364; 7.92%	Maxime Bernier; 36,915; 67.02%	Cléo Chartier; 1,405; 2.55%	Jean-Claude Roy; 1,397; 2.54%		Claude Drouin†
Brome—Missisquoi	Christian Ouellet; 18,596; 38.33%	Denis Paradis; 13,569; 27.97%	David Marler; 9,874; 20.35%	Josianne Jetté; 2,839; 5.85%	Michel Champagne; 1,721; 3.55%	Heward Grafftey (PC); 1,921; 3.96%	Denis Paradis
Compton—Stanstead	France Bonsant; 21,316; 42.77%	David Price; 11,126; 22.32%	Gary Caldwell; 12,131; 24.34%	Stéphane Bürgi; 3,099; 6.22%	Gaétan Perreault; 2,171; 4.36%		France Bonsant
Drummond	Pauline Picard; 22,575; 49.69%	Éric Cardinal; 7,437; 16.37%	Jean-Marie Pineault; 10,134; 22.30%	François Choquette; 2,870; 6.32%	Jean-Benjamin Milot; 2,418; 5.32%		Pauline Picard
Mégantic—L'Érable	Marc Boulianne; 15,410; 32.62%	Yvan Corriveau; 4,912; 10.40%	Christian Paradis; 23,550; 49.85%	Isabelle Tremblay; 1,836; 3.89%	Jean François Hamel; 1,534; 3.25%		Marc Boulianne
Richmond—Arthabaska	André Bellavance; 24,466; 47.89%	Louis Napoléon Mercier; 5,294; 10.36%	Jean Landry; 16,465; 32.23%	Isabelle Maguire; 2,507; 4.91%	Laurier Busque; 2,355; 4.61%		André Bellavance
Saint-Hyacinthe—Bagot	Yvan Loubier; 27,838; 56.02%	Stéphane Deschênes; 4,884; 9.83%	Huguette Guilhaumon; 12,323; 24.80%	Joëlle Chevrier; 2,723; 5.48%	Jacques Tétreault; 1,925; 3.87%		Yvan Loubier
Shefford	Robert Vincent; 22,159; 43.09%	Diane St-Jacques; 12,043; 23.42%	Jean Lambert; 12,734; 24.76%	Paula Maundcote; 2,431; 4.73%	Francine Brière; 2,061; 4.01%		Robert Vincent
Sherbrooke	Serge Cardin; 27,112; 52.20%	Robert Pouliot; 6,863; 13.21%	Marc Nadeau; 10,763; 20.72%	Martin Plaisance; 4,646; 8.95%	Michel Quirion; 2,238; 4.31%	Claudia Laroche-Martel (Ind.); 315; 0.61%	Serge Cardin

=== 2004 ===
Electoral district	Candidates					Incumbent
Electoral district	Liberal	BQ	Conservative	NDP	Green	Incumbent
Beauce	Claude Drouin; 19,592; 41.38%	Jean-François Barbe; 17,168; 36.26%	Alain Guay; 8,091; 17.09%	Philippe Giguère; 1,443; 3.05%	Michel Binette; 1,054; 2.23%	Claude Drouin
Brome—Missisquoi	Denis Paradis; 18,609; 42.08%	Christian Ouellet; 17,537; 39.66%	Peter Stastny; 4,888; 11.05%	Piper Huggins; 1,177; 2.66%	Louise Martineau; 2,011; 4.55%	Denis Paradis
Compton—Stanstead	David Price; 15,752; 35.97%	France Bonsant; 20,450; 46.70%	Gary Caldwell; 4,589; 10.48%	Martin Baller; 1,451; 3.31%	Laurier Busque; 1,546; 3.53%	David Price
Drummond	Roger Gougeon; 9,591; 22.81%	Pauline Picard; 23,670; 56.29%	Lyne Boisvert; 7,123; 16.94%	Blake Evans; 745; 1.77%	Louis Lacroix; 921; 2.19%	Pauline Picard
Mégantic—L'Érable	Gérard Binet; 15,778; 36.65%	Marc Boulianne; 19,264; 44.74%	Yves Mailly; 4,916; 11.42%	Alexandre Côté; 1,608; 3.73%	Bruno Vézina; 1,489; 3.46%	Gérard Binet; Frontenac—Mégantic
Richmond—Arthabaska	Christine St-Pierre; 12,809; 27.15%	André Bellavance; 26,211; 55.55%	Pierre Poissant; 4,925; 10.44%	Jason S. Noble; 1,540; 3.26%	Lucie Laforest; 1,699; 3.60%	André Bachand†^{1}
Saint-Hyacinthe—Bagot	Michel Gaudette; 10,558; 22.12%	Yvan Loubier; 29,789; 62.40%	Andrée Champagne; 5,240; 10.98%	Joëlle Chevrier; 1,204; 2.52%	Bruno Godbout; 948; 1.99%	Yvan Loubier
Shefford	Diane St-Jacques; 18,725; 39.72%	Robert Vincent; 21,968; 46.60%	Jacques Parenteau; 3,732; 7.92%	Sonia Bisson; 1,146; 2.43%	Francine Brière; 1,571; 3.33%	Diane St-Jacques
Sherbrooke	Bruno-Marie Béchard; 15,482; 31.01%	Serge Cardin; 29,323; 58.74%	Réal Leblanc; 2,142; 4.29%	Philippe Dion; 1,463; 2.93%	Jeffrey Champagne; 1,509; 3.02%	Serge Cardin

^{1} Bachand was formerly a PC

==== Maps ====
1. Beauce
2. Brome-Mississquoi
3. Compton-Stanstead
4. Drummond
5. Mégantic-L'Érable
6. Richmond-Arthabaska
7. Saint-Hyacinthe-Bagot
8. Shefford
9. Sherbrooke
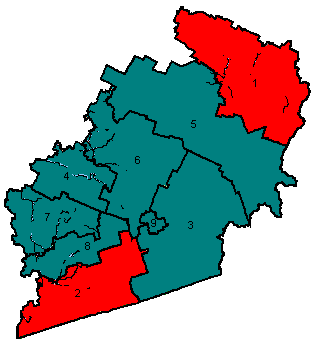
Key map

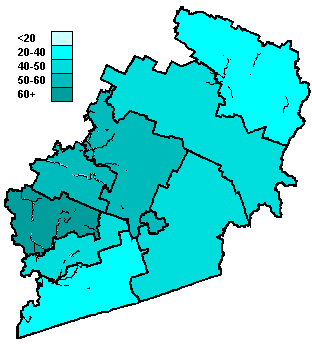
Bloc Québécois

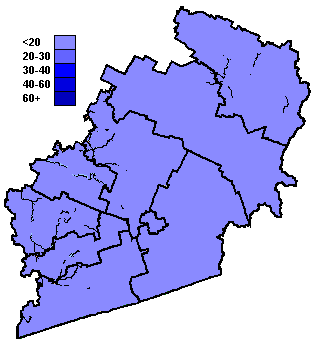
Conservative Party of Canada

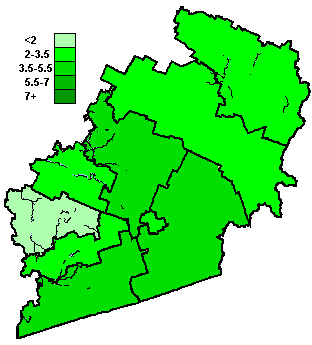
Green Party of Canada

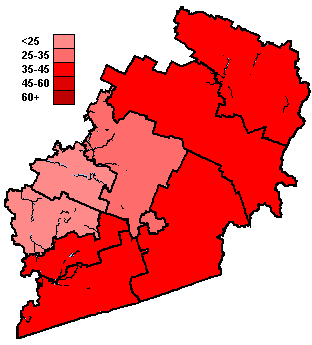
Liberal Party of Canada

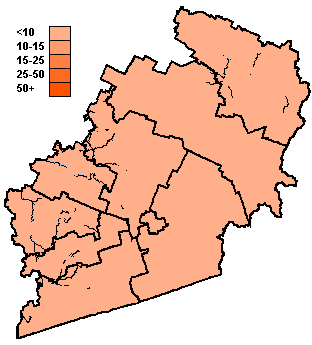
New Democratic Party

=== 2000 ===
Electoral district	Candidates						Incumbent
Electoral district	BQ	Liberal	Canadian Alliance	NDP	PC	Other	Incumbent
Beauce	Gary Morin; 12,323; 26.51%	Claude Drouin; 26,033; 56.01%	Alain Guay; 5,452; 11.73%	Pierre Malano; 436; 0.94%	Gérard Parent; 1,628; 3.50%	Louis Girard (NLP); 611; 1.31%	Claude Drouin
Brome—Missisquoi	André Leroux; 13,363; 31.17%	Denis Paradis; 21,545; 50.26%	Jacques Loyer; 1,977; 4.61%	Jeff Itcush; 480; 1.12%	Heward Grafftey; 5,502; 12.84%		Denis Paradis
Compton—Stanstead	Gaston Leroux; 14,808; 38.89%	David Price; 17,729; 46.56%	Marc Carrier; 2,061; 5.41%	Christine Moore; 580; 1.52%	Mary Ann Dewey-Plante; 2,422; 6.36%	Marc Roy (NLP); 476; 1.25%	David Price
Drummond	Pauline Picard; 18,970; 45.27%	André Béliveau; 14,335; 34.21%	Jacques Laurin; 1,621; 3.87%	Julie Philion; 423; 1.01%	Lyne Boisvert; 6,559; 15.65%		Pauline Picard
Frontenac—Mégantic	Jean-Guy Chrétien; 15,703; 42.27%	Gérard Binet; 17,069; 45.95%	Stéphane Musial; 1,751; 4.71%	Olivier Chalifoux; 427; 1.15%	Nicole Massicotte; 1,497; 4.03%	Pierre Luc Fournier (Mar.); 698; 1.88%	Jean-Guy Chrétien
Richmond—Arthabaska	André Bellavance; 18,067; 36.47%	Aldéi Beaudoin; 10,416; 21.03%	Philippe Ardilliez; 1,930; 3.90%	Vincent Bernier; 319; 0.64%	André Bachand; 18,430; 37.20%	Christian Simard (NLP); 375; 0.76%	André Bachand
Saint-Hyacinthe—Bagot	Yvan Loubier; 25,916; 55.41%	Michel Gaudette; 16,265; 34.77%	Jacques Bousquet; 2,161; 4.62%	Rachel Dicaire; 499; 1.07%	Frédéric Mantha; 1,932; 4.13%		Yvan Loubier
Shefford	Michel Benoit; 19,816; 43.95%	Diane St-Jacques; 20,707; 45.93%	Jean-Jacques Treyvaud; 1,867; 4.14%	Elizabeth Morey; 380; 0.84%	Audrey Castonguay; 1,498; 3.32%	Nicholas Cousineau (Mar.); 819; 1.82%	Diane St-Jacques
Sherbrooke	Serge Cardin; 23,559; 46.53%	Jean-François Rouleau; 21,182; 41.84%	Mark Quinlan; 2,284; 4.51%	Craig Wright; 677; 1.34%	Eric L'Heureux; 1,955; 3.86%	Joseph Adrien Serge Bourassa-Lacombe (Ind.); 294 0.58% Daniel Jolicoeur (NLP); 495 0.98% Serge Lachapelle (M-L); 186 0.37%	Serge Cardin

=== 1997 ===
Electoral district	Candidates					Incumbent
Electoral district	BQ	Liberal	PC	NDP	Other	Incumbent
Beauce	Lucie Dion; 12,002	Claude Drouin; 22,156	Lise Bernier; 9,385	Joël Pinon; 735	Lili Weemen (Ind); 843	Gilles Bernier
Brome—Missisquoi	Noël Lacasse; 12,652	Denis Paradis; 19,261	Claude Boulard; 12,770	Nicole Guillemet; 781		Denis Paradis
Compton—Stanstead	Maurice Bernier; 13,367	Gaétan Grenier; 8,119	David Price; 18,125	Christine Moore; 587	Lisette Proulx (NL); 439	Maurice Bernier; Mégantic—Compton—Stanstead
Drummond	Pauline Picard; 18,577	Christian Méthot; 10,165	Lyne Boisvert; 14,777	Alexandra Philoctéte; 441		Pauline Picard
Frontenac—Mégantic	Jean-Guy Chrétien; 14,433	Manon Lecours; 13,968	Carole Dodier; 9,885	Sara Mayo; 252	Serge Trépanier (NL); 365	Jean-Guy Chrétien; Frontenac
Richmond—Arthabaska	Gaston Leroux; 19,319	Aldéi Beaudoin; 10,613	André Bachand; 21,687	Martin Bergeron; 641		Gaston Leroux; Richmond—Wolfe
Saint-Hyacinthe—Bagot	Yvan Loubier; 21,116	Antoine Locas; 10,970	Jean-François Milette; 16,313	Jacques Bousquet; 809		Yvan Loubier
Shefford	Jean Leroux; 17,376	Chantal Gareau; 12,699	Diane St-Jacques; 17,897	Karen Hurley; 531		Jean Leroux
Sherbrooke	Jacques Blanchette; 16,086	Martin Bureau; 4,720	Jean Charest; 32,228	Tom Vouloumanos; 628	Christian Simard (NL); 477	Jean Charest

=== 1993 ===
Electoral district	Candidates						Incumbent
Electoral district	BQ	Liberal	PC	NDP	Natural Law	Other	Incumbent
Beauce	Jean-Guy Breton; 18,271	Pierre Gravel; 7,336	Jeannine Bourque; 4,098	Tom Vouloumanos; 364		Gilles Bernier (Ind); 20,238	Gilles Bernier
Brome—Missisquoi	Gaston Péloquin; 17,894	Joan Kouri; 16,243	Francine Vincelette; 7,571	Sean Hutchinson; 550	Yves Décarie; 566	Jean Guy Peloquin (Abol.); 733; Gary Wightman (Ind.); 381; Edmond Séguin (Nat); 154	Gabrielle Bertrand
Drummond	Pauline Picard; 24,930	Bernard Boudreau; 10,935	Jean-Guy Guilbault; 9,041	Ferdinand Berner; 600			Jean-Guy Guilbault
Frontenac	Jean-Guy Chrétien; 18,603	Jean-Guy Jam; 6,984	Jean-Claude Nadeau; 5,017	Joseph Bowman; 332		Jean-René Guernon (Green); 359; John Turmel (Abol); 195	Marcel Masse
Mégantic—Compton—Stanstead	Maurice Bernier; 17,317	Eugene Naylor; 13,538	Gilles Goddard; 6,042	Martine Simard; 495	Jacqueline Benoît; 767	Marco Bissonnette (Abol.); 215; James Stewart (Nat); 198	François Gérin
Richmond—Wolfe	Gaston Leroux; 22,235	Gaétan Dumas; 9,159	Yvon Coté; 10,004	Marc-André Peloquin; 476	Anne-Marie Marois; 678		Yvon Coté
Saint-Hyacinthe—Bagot	Yvan Loubier; 28,014	Hélène Riendeau; 10,124	Andrée Champagne; 9,834	Luc Chamberland; 848			Andrée Champagne
Shefford	Jean Leroux; 27,001	Roger Légaré; 14,152	Jocelyn Compagnat; 5,750	Marielle Sanna; 586	Michèle Beausoleil; 758	Denis Loubier (Abol); 470	Jean Lapierre
Sherbrooke	Guy Boutin; 21,559	Jean Paul Pelletier; 4,462	Jean Charest; 29,740	Martine Caouette; 445	Serge Trépanier; 516	Jean-Guy Trépanier (Abol); 91	Jean Charest

2. Jean Lapierre was elected as a Liberal in 1988 election but left the Liberal caucus in 1990 to seat as a Bloc Québécois MP.

=== 1988 ===
Electoral district	Candidates					Incumbent
Electoral district	Liberal	PC	NDP	Rhinoceros	Other	Incumbent
Beauce	Pierre-Maurice Vachon; 13,641	Gilles Bernier; 36,212	Danielle Wolfe; 2,856			Gilles Bernier
Brome—Missisquoi	André Bachand; 13,733	Gabrielle Bertrand; 22,540	Paul Vachon; 5,489			Gabrielle Bertrand
Drummond	Jean-Claude Lagacé; 15,380	Jean-Guy Guilbault; 23,703	Ferdinand Berner; 5,204			Jean-Guy Guilbault
Frontenac	Réal Patry; 6,978	Marcel Masse; 25,872	Claude L'Heureux; 1,785		Jean-René Guernon (Green); 511	Marcel Masse
Mégantic—Compton—Stanstead	Jean-Guy Landry; 11,566	François Gérin; 23,246	Jean-Pierre Walsh; 3,195		Yvan Lanctot (Socred); 550	François Gérin
Richmond—Wolfe	Alain Tardif; 16,813	Yvon Coté; 19,451	Marc-André Peloquin; 3,918	Jean Marceau; 790		Alain Tardif
Saint-Hyacinthe—Bagot	Michel Gaudette; 16,289	Andrée Champagne; 25,267	Hélène Lortie-Narayana; 6,442			Andrée Champagne
Shefford	Jean Lapierre; 23,943	Danielle Coté; 21,445	Paul Pearson; 4,242			Jean Lapierre
Sherbrooke	Dennis Wood; 12,314	Jean Charest; 34,538	Alain Poirier; 6,373	Bébé Sept Heures Pierre Granger; 1,040	Normand Guy (Ind); 148; Yves Lawler (Comm); 143	Jean Charest

=== 1984 ===
Electoral district	Candidates						Incumbent
Electoral district	PC	Liberal	NDP	Parti nationaliste	Social Credit	Other	Incumbent
Beauce	Gilles Bernier; 25,028	Normand Lapointe; 20,323	Serge L'Italien; 1,217	Paul-Emile Grondin; 569			Normand Lapointe
Brome—Missisquoi	Gabrielle Bertrand; 21,678	André Bachand; 15,693	Gordon J. Hamilton; 2,271	Yvon Bélair; 997		David Chamberlain (Liber.); 116; Michel Boissonnault (PfC); 96	André Bachand
Drummond	Jean-Guy Guilbault; 23,693	Michel Yip; 14,137	Louis G. Garreau; 2,610	Camillien Belhumeur; 1,057	René Martineau; 301	Joseph Richard Miller (Ind); 338	Yvon Pinard
Frontenac	Marcel Masse; 28,246	Léopold Corriveau; 9,154	Rita Bouchard; 1,081	Richard Houle; 386		Pierre Fournier (Rhino); 823	Léopold Corriveau
Mégantic—Compton—Stanstead	François Gérin; 25,679	Claude Tessier; 13,123	Jean-Pierre Walsh; 2,690	Michel Houde; 427	Robert Bélanger; 399	Andrew McCammon (Green); 454; Ronald A. Javitch (PfC); 51	Claude Tessier
Richmond—Wolfe	Jean-Jacques Croteau; 13,835	Alain Tardif; 18,069	Harriet J. Schleifer; 1,638	Ivan Hébert-Croteau; 1,339	Léo Dion; 273		Alain Tardif
Saint-Hyacinthe—Bagot	Andrée Champagne; 22,984	Marcel Ostiguy; 21,394	Claude R. Gagnon; 2,196	Bertrand Desrosiers; 940		Serge Alexis Lemoyne (Rhino); 998; Laurent Gauthier (PfC); 33	Marcel Ostiguy
Shefford	Denis Loubier; 23,028	Jean Lapierre; 25,483	Denis Boissé; 3,569	Pierre C. Boivin; 1,552			Jean Lapierre
Sherbrooke	Jean Charest; 22,232	Irénée Pelletier; 14,607	Daniel Berthold; 4,230	Lorraine Déry; 687	Fernand Bourret; 197	Gilbert Peupa Ash (Rhino); 1,054; Yves Lawler (Comm); 92; Françoise Chanteau (PfC); 72	Irénée Pelletier
