= Dandurand =

Dandurand is a surname. Notable people with the surname include:

- Joseph A. Dandurand (21st century), Canadian poet, playwright, and archaeologist
- Léo Dandurand (1889–1964), American ice hockey coach and businessman
- Marianne Dandurand, Canadian politician
- Raoul Dandurand (1861–1942), Canadian politician and organizer
