= France Bonsant =

Canadian politician

Member of Parliament for Compton—Stanstead
- In office 2004–2011
- Preceded by: David Price
- Succeeded by: Jean Rousseau

Personal details
- Born: August 18, 1952 (age 73) Waterville, Quebec
- Party: Bloc Québécois
- Profession: Engineer, regional councillor

France Bonsant (born August 18, 1952 in Waterville, Quebec) is a Canadian politician.

== Biography ==
She was a Bloc Québécois member of the House of Commons of Canada. She represented the district of Compton—Stanstead from 2004 to 2011. From 1991 to 1999 she was a regional councillor in Le Haut-Saint-François Regional County Municipality representing the municipality of Ascot Corner.

== Electoral record ==
2015 Canadian federal election: Compton—Stanstead
Party	Candidate	Votes	%	±%	Expenditures
Liberal	Marie-Claude Bibeau	20,582	36.88	+24.89	$30,817.38
New Democratic	Jean Rousseau	15,300	27.41	-19.86	$22,398.05
Bloc Québécois	France Bonsant	11,551	20.70	-5.73	$41,452.44
Conservative	Gustavo Labrador	6,978	12.50	+0.65	$24,135.57
Green	Korie Marshall	1,085	1.94	-0.49	–
Rhinoceros	Kévin Côté	315	0.56	–	–
Total valid votes/expense limit		55,811	100.00		$218,288.13
Total rejected ballots		748	1.32	–	
Turnout		56,559	69.09	–	
Eligible voters		81,867			
Liberal gain from New Democratic		Swing		+22.37	
Source: Elections Canada

2011 Canadian federal election: Compton—Stanstead
Party	Candidate	Votes	%	±%	Expenditures
New Democratic	Jean Rousseau	24,097	47.59	+36.31	
Bloc Québécois	France Bonsant	13,179	26.03	15.82	
Liberal	William Hogg	6,132	12.09	-10.44	
Conservative	Sandrine Gressard Bélanger	5,982	11.72	-7.72	
Green	Gary Caldwell	1,241	2.57	-2.30	
Total valid votes/expense limit		50,631	100.00		
Total rejected ballots		580	1.13	-0.03	
Turnout		51,211	64.59	+2.61	
Eligible voters		80,382	–	–	
Percentage changes are in comparison to 2008 voting after adjusting for redistribution

2008 Canadian federal election: Compton—Stanstead
Party	Candidate	Votes	%	±%	Expenditures
Bloc Québécois	France Bonsant	20,332	41.85	-0.9	$42,534
Liberal	William Hogg	10,946	22.53	+0.2	$17,476
Conservative	Michel Gagné	9,445	19.44	-4.9	$57,862
New Democratic	Jean Rousseau	5,483	11.28	+5.1	$1,820
Green	Gary Caldwell	2,368	4.87	+0.5	$11,114
Total valid votes/expense limit		48,574	100.00	$84,153	
Total rejected ballots		572	1.16		
Turnout		49,146	62.97		

2006 Canadian federal election: Compton—Stanstead
Party	Candidate	Votes	%	±%	Expenditures
Bloc Québécois	France Bonsant	21,316	42.8	-3.9	$38,909
Conservative	Gary Caldwell	12,131	24.3	+13.9	$44,452
Liberal	David Price	11,126	22.3	-13.7	$56,653
New Democratic	Stéphane Bürgi	3,099	6.2	+2.9	$1,674
Green	Gaétan Perreault	2,171	4.4	+0.8	$310
Total valid votes/expense limit		49,843	100.0	$77,428	

2004 Canadian federal election: Compton—Stanstead
Party	Candidate	Votes	%	±%	Expenditures
Bloc Québécois	France Bonsant	20,450	46.7	+7.8	$36,450
Liberal	David Price	15,752	36.0	-10.6	$55,575
Conservative	Gary Caldwell	4,589	10.5	-1.3	$13,713
Green	Laurier Busque	1,546	3.5		$540
New Democratic	Martin Baller	1,451	3.3	+1.8	
Total valid votes/expense limit		43,788	100.0	$75,354	
