= Frontenac—Mégantic =

Former federal electoral district in Quebec, Canada

Quebec electoral district

Defunct federal electoral district
- Legislature: House of Commons
- District created: 1996
- District abolished: 2003
- First contested: 1997
- Last contested: 2000

Frontenac—Mégantic was a federal electoral district in Quebec, Canada, that was represented in the House of Commons of Canada from 1997 to 2004.

It was created in 1996 from the Mégantic—Compton—Stanstead riding. It was abolished in 2003 when it was redistributed into Beauce, Compton—Stanstead and Mégantic—L'Érable ridings.

It consisted of:

- the cities of Black Lake, Disraeli, Lac-Mégantic, Scotstown and Thetford Mines;
- the County Regional Municipality of L'Amiante;
- the County Regional Municipality of Le Granit, excepting: the municipalities of Risborough and Saint-Robert-Bellarmin; the Municipality of the United Townships of Risborough-et-partie-de-Marlow;
- in the County Regional Municipality of Le Haut-Saint-François: the village municipalities of La Patrie, Saint-Gérard and Weedon Centre; the township municipalities of Ditton, Hampden, Lingwick and Weedon; the municipalities of Chartierville and Fontainebleau.

== Members of Parliament ==
This riding elected the following members of Parliament:

Parliament	Years	Member	Party
Frontenac—Mégantic; Riding created from Frontenac and Mégantic—Compton—Stanstead
36th	1997–2000	Jean-Guy Chrétien	Bloc Québécois
37th	2000–2004	Gérard Binet	Liberal
Riding dissolved into Beauce, Compton—Stanstead and Mégantic—L'Érable

The riding was a swing riding between the Liberal Party and the Bloc Québécois.

== Election results ==
1997 Canadian federal election
Party	Candidate	Votes
Bloc Québécois	Jean-Guy Chrétien	14,433
Liberal	Manon Lecours	13,968
Progressive Conservative	Carole Dodier	9,885
Natural Law	Serge Trépanier	365
New Democratic	Sara Mayo	252

2000 Canadian federal election
Party	Candidate	Votes
Liberal	Gérard Binet	17,069
Bloc Québécois	Jean-Guy Chrétien	15,703
Alliance	Stéphane Musial	1,751
Progressive Conservative	Nicole Massicotte	1,497
Marijuana	Pierre Luc Fournier	698
New Democratic	Olivier Chalifoux	427

== See also ==
- List of Canadian electoral districts
- Historical federal electoral districts of Canada
