= Yvon Côté =

Canadian politician

Member of Parliament for Richmond—Wolfe
- In office 1988–1993
- Preceded by: Alain Tardif
- Succeeded by: Gaston Leroux

Personal details
- Born: 16 March 1939 Asbestos, Quebec
- Died: 27 December 2023 (aged 84)
- Party: Progressive Conservative
- Profession: teacher

Yvon Côté (16 March 1939 – 27 December 2023) is a former member of the House of Commons of Canada from 1988 to 1993.

He was elected in the 1988 federal election at the Richmond—Wolfe electoral district for the Progressive Conservative party. He served in the 34th Canadian Parliament after which he was defeated by Gaston Leroux of the Bloc Québécois in the 1993 federal election.
