= Ascot Corner =

- Municipality
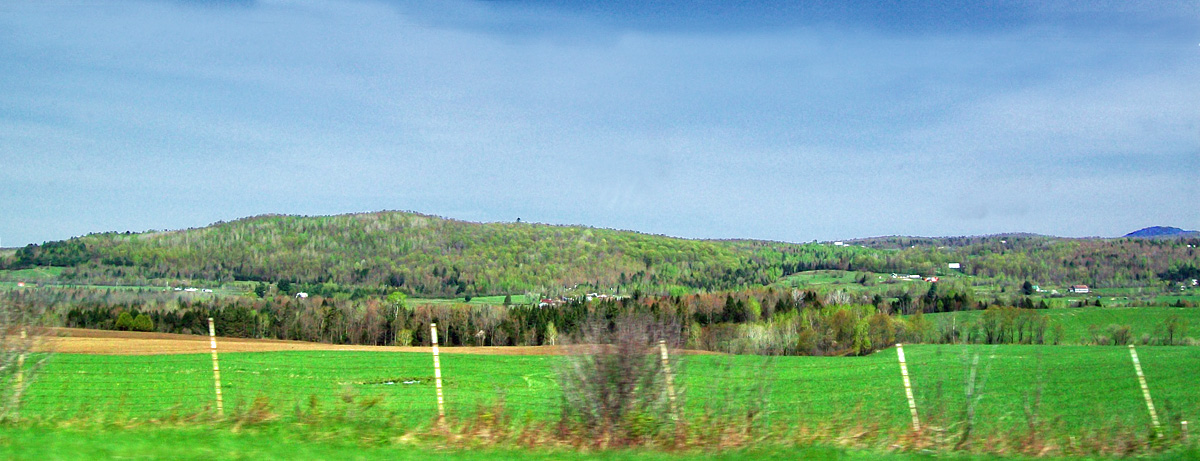

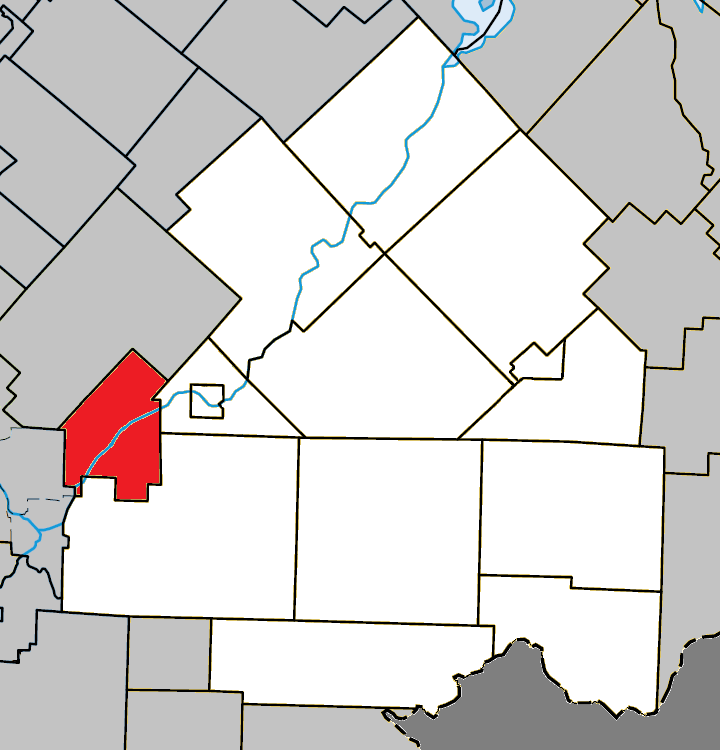
- Location within Le Haut-Saint-François RCM

- Location in southern Quebec
- Coordinates: 45°27′N 71°46′W
- Country: Canada
- Province: Quebec
- Region: Estrie
- RCM: Le Haut-Saint-François
- Constituted: March 28, 1901

Government
  - Mayor: Nathalie Bresse
  - Federal riding: Compton—Stanstead
  - Prov. riding: Mégantic

Area
  - Total: 85.20 km^{2} (32.90 sq mi)
  - Land: 81.64 km^{2} (31.52 sq mi)

Population (2021)
  - Total: 3,368
  - Density: 41.3/km^{2} (107/sq mi)
  - Pop 2016-2021: ▲6.6%
  - Dwellings: 1,364
- Time zone: UTC−5 (EST)
  - Summer (DST): UTC−4 (EDT)
- Postal code(s): J0B 1A0
- Area code: 819
- Highways: R-112
- Website: www.ascot-corner.com

Ascot Corner (2021 population 3,368) is a municipality in Le Haut-Saint-François Regional County Municipality in the Estrie region of Quebec.

== Demographics ==
=== Population ===
Canada census – Ascot Corner community profile

	2021	2011
Population	3,368 (+6.6% from 2016)	2,891 (+11.4% from 2006)
Land area	81.64 km^{2} (31.52 sq mi)	82.47 km^{2} (31.84 sq mi)
Population density	41.3/km^{2} (107/sq mi)	35.1/km^{2} (91/sq mi)
Median age	40.0 (M: 41.2, F: 39.2)	38.1 (M: 39.4, F: 37.0)
Private dwellings	1,364 (total) 1,310 (occupied)	1,107 (total)
Median household income	$88,000	$60,802

Notes: Population in 1996: 2,280 (+1.4% from 1991) - Population in 1991: 2,248
References: 2021 2011
