= Marianne Dandurand =

Canadian politician

Marianne Dandurand MP

Member of Parliament for Compton—Stanstead
- Incumbent
- Assumed office April 28, 2025
- Preceded by: Marie-Claude Bibeau

Personal details
- Party: Liberal
- Website: mariannedandurand.ca/en/

Marianne Dandurand MP is a Canadian politician from the Liberal Party of Canada. She was elected Member of Parliament for Compton—Stanstead in the 2025 Canadian federal election. She was former chief of staff to Marie-Claude Bibeau.

At the time of the 2025 Canadian federal election, she lived in Sherbrooke.

== Electoral record ==
2025 Canadian federal election: Compton—Stanstead
Party	Candidate	Votes	%	±%
Liberal	Marianne Dandurand	29,951	45.64	+8.98
Bloc Québécois	Nathalie Bresse	17,305	26.37	-4.14
Conservative	Jacques Painchaud	14,292	21.78	+4.37
New Democratic	Valérie Laliberté	2,124	3.24	-4.30
Green	Sébastien Tremblay	1,161	1.77	-1.04
People's	Paul Lehmann	787	1.20	-2.56
Total valid votes		65,620	98.72	
Total rejected ballots		849	1.28	-0.45
Turnout		66,469	71.82	+4.57
Eligible voters		92,551		
Liberal notional hold		Swing		+6.56
Source: Elections Canada
Note: number of eligible voters does not include voting day registrations.
