= Marcel Masse =

Canadian politician (1936–2014)

The Honourable Marcel Masse PC OQ
- Masse in 1996

Minister of National Defence
- In office April 21, 1991 – January 3, 1993
- Prime Minister: Brian Mulroney
- Preceded by: Bill McKnight
- Succeeded by: Kim Campbell

Minister of Energy, Mines and Resources
- In office June 30, 1986 – January 29, 1989
- Prime Minister: Brian Mulroney
- Preceded by: Pat Carney
- Succeeded by: Jake Epp

Member of Parliament for Frontenac
- In office September 4, 1984 – October 24, 1993
- Preceded by: Léopold Corriveau
- Succeeded by: Jean-Guy Chrétien

Member of the National Assembly of Quebec for Montcalm
- In office June 5, 1966 – October 28, 1973
- Preceded by: Gérard Martin
- Succeeded by: District merged with Joliette

Personal details
- Born: May 27, 1936 Saint-Jean-de-Matha, Quebec, Canada
- Died: August 25, 2014 (aged 78) Sainte-Agathe-des-Monts, Quebec, Canada
- Party: Progressive Conservative; Union Nationale (until 1971)
- Education: Université de Montréal; Sciences Po; Sorbonne University

Marcel Masse PC OQ (French pronunciation: [maʁsɛl mas]; May 27, 1936 – August 25, 2014) was a Canadian politician who represented Montcalm in the National Assembly of Quebec from 1966 to 1973 and Frontenac in the House of Commons of Canada from 1984 to 1993. He served in the federal cabinet as Minister of Energy, Mines and Resources (1986–1989) and Minister of National Defence (1991–1993) under Prime Minister Brian Mulroney.

== Biography ==
=== Background ===
Masse studied at the Université de Montréal and pursued graduate work in Paris. He worked as a high school teacher in Joliette, Quebec, from 1962 to 1966.

=== Provincial politics ===
In the 1966 Quebec provincial election, he was elected to the Quebec Legislative Assembly in the riding of Montcalm as a member of the Union Nationale (UN), a conservative political party. He served as a minister in the governments of premiers Daniel Johnson (1966–1968) and Jean-Jacques Bertrand (1968–1970).

Masse was re-elected in 1970. He was a leadership candidate at the party convention of 1971, but lost by 21 votes. He left the Union Nationale to sit as an independent until his term expired in 1973. In 1974, Masse was hired by the engineering firm Lavalin as an administrator.

=== Federal politics ===
He attempted to win a seat in the House of Commons of Canada as a Progressive Conservative candidate, but was defeated in the 1974 and 1980 federal elections. He was elected as Member of Parliament for Frontenac in the 1984 election that brought Brian Mulroney and the Tories to power.

Prime Minister Mulroney appointed Masse to the position of Minister of Communications. Masse resigned from the Canadian Cabinet on September 25, 1985, during an investigation by the Royal Canadian Mounted Police of alleged overspending during his election campaign. He returned to Cabinet on November 30 after being cleared of any wrongdoing.

As Communications Minister, Masse was responsible for Canada's cultural policy. He argued against measures that would undermine the country's cultural sovereignty during negotiations leading to the Canada–United States Free Trade Agreement. He was moved out of the Communications portfolio to that of Minister of Energy in 1986 when it appeared to Mulroney that Masse might be an obstacle to the free trade negotiations. Masse was moved back to Communications following the 1988 election and the implementation of the Free Trade Agreement.

In 1991, Masse became Minister of National Defence. He resigned from cabinet in January 1993 along with a number of other ministers who were not intending to run in the 1993 election.

=== Retirement ===
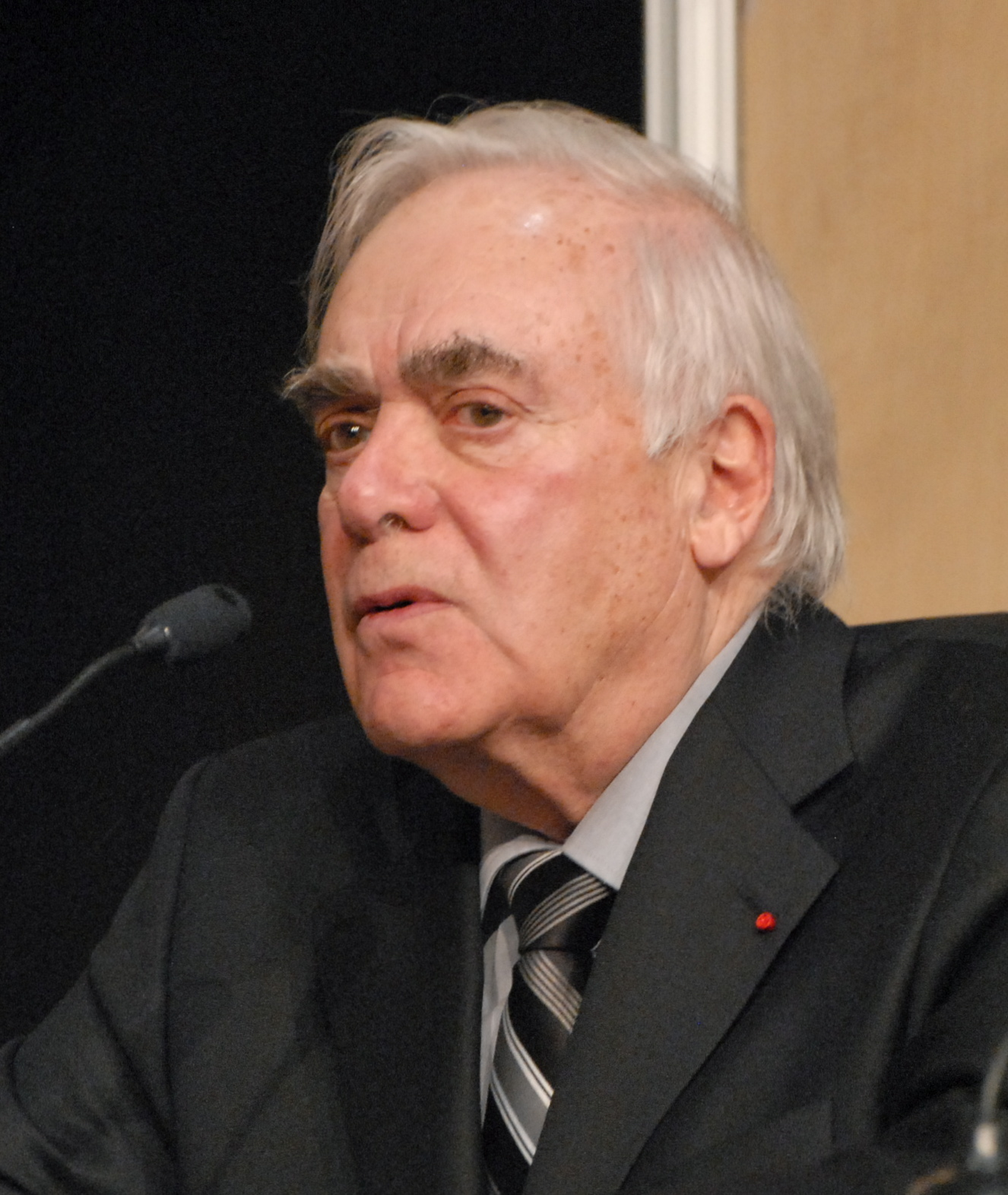
Masse in 2012

Since leaving federal politics Masse, a moderate Quebec nationalist, has served in a number of positions under the Parti Québécois governments of Jacques Parizeau and Lucien Bouchard. He was head of one of fourteen regional committees that held public hearings on Quebec independence in 1995 in the run up to the 1995 Quebec referendum on sovereignty. He served as president of the Conseil de la langue française du Québec in 1995, and as Quebec's delegate-general in France from 1996 to 1997. He has also served as chair of the Commission des biens culturels du Québec.

In 1995, he was made an Officer of the National Order of Quebec. In 1989, he was made a Commander of the Order of La Pléiade and an Officer of the Legion of Honour in 1999. He is also a Commander of the Ordre des Palmes Académiques.

=== Death ===
Masse died on August 25, 2014. Circumstances of his death were not immediately disclosed.

== Archives ==
There are Marcel Masse fonds at Library and Archives Canada and the Bibliothèque et Archives nationales du Québec.

Political offices
Preceded by Pat Carney	Minister of Energy, Mines and Resources; 1986–1989	Succeeded by Jake Epp
Preceded by Bill McKnight	Minister of National Defence; 1991–1993	Succeeded by Kim Campbell
