= Christian Paradis =

Canadian politician (born 1974)

The Honourable Christian Paradis PC
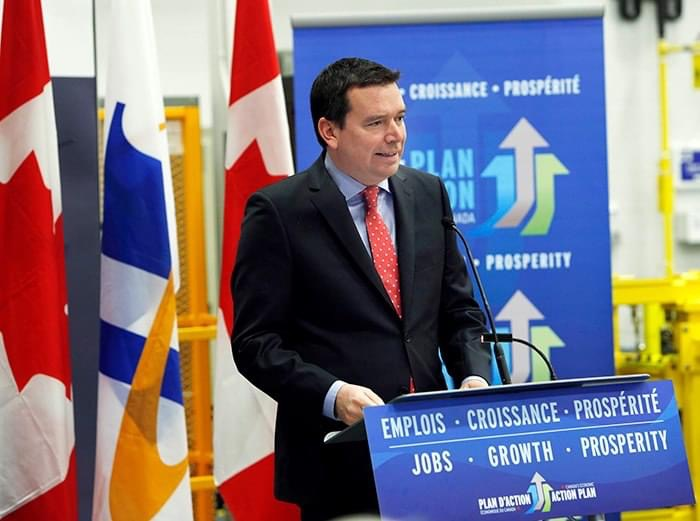
- Paradis introduces an action plan for the economy, 2012

Minister for International Development Minister for La Francophonie
- In office July 15, 2013 – November 4, 2015
- Prime Minister: Stephen Harper
- Preceded by: Julian Fantino (Int. Development); Steven Blaney (La Francophonie)
- Succeeded by: Marie-Claude Bibeau

Minister of Industry
- In office May 18, 2011 – July 15, 2013
- Prime Minister: Stephen Harper
- Preceded by: Tony Clement
- Succeeded by: James Moore

Minister of Natural Resources
- In office January 19, 2010 – May 19, 2011
- Prime Minister: Stephen Harper
- Preceded by: Lisa Raitt
- Succeeded by: Joe Oliver

Minister of Public Services and Procurement
- In office June 25, 2008 – January 19, 2010
- Prime Minister: Stephen Harper
- Preceded by: Michael Fortier
- Succeeded by: Rona Ambrose

Member of Parliament for Mégantic—L'Érable
- In office January 23, 2006 – August 4, 2015
- Preceded by: Marc Boulianne
- Succeeded by: Luc Berthold

Personal details
- Born: January 1, 1974 (age 52) Thetford Mines, Quebec, Canada
- Party: Conservative
- Spouse: Julie Roberge
- Education: Université de Sherbrooke Université Laval
- Profession: Lawyer
- Portfolio: Minister of Industry; Quebec Lieutenant

Christian Paradis PC (French pronunciation: [kʁistjɑ̃ paʁadi]; born January 1, 1974) is a Canadian politician who served as the Member of Parliament (MP) for Mégantic—L'Érable from 2006 to 2015. A member of the Conservative Party of Canada, he was first elected in the 2006 federal election and served as parliamentary secretary to the Minister of Natural Resources until January 4, 2007, when he was appointed Secretary of State for Agriculture and Agri-Food Canada and the Rural Secretariat. On June 25, 2008, Paradis was appointed Minister of Public Works and Government Services, retaining his position as Secretary of State for Agriculture until October that same year. On October 30, 2008, in a cabinet shuffle following the election, he retained the Public Works portfolio. In addition, he succeeded Lawrence Cannon as Quebec Lieutenant. On January 19, 2010, in a cabinet shuffle, Prime Minister Harper appointed him Minister of Natural Resources. On May 18, 2011, in a cabinet shuffle he was appointed to be the Minister of Industry. On July 15, 2013, in a cabinet shuffle, he was appointed as Minister of International Development and Minister for La Francophonie.

Paradis did not run in the 2015 federal election, and in December 2015, it was announced that he would be the Senior Vice President, Strategic Development of Protective Services at GardaWorld, starting January 2016.

== Early life and career ==
Originally from Thetford Mines, he graduated from the University of Sherbrooke in civil law and holds a graduate degree in corporate law from Laval University. He entered the Quebec Bar in 1997. He is the son of Pierre Paradis, also a lawyer.

He chaired the Asbestos Chamber of Commerce in 2004 and 2005.

Christian Paradis has been married to Julie Roberge since June 2000 and is the father of three children.

He was first elected in the 2006 federal election and served as parliamentary secretary to the Minister of Natural Resources until January 4, 2007, when he was appointed Secretary of State for Agriculture and Agri-Food Canada and the Rural Secretariat. On June 25, 2008, Paradis was appointed Minister of Public Works and Government Services, retaining his position as Secretary of State for Agriculture until October that same year. On October 30, 2008, in a cabinet shuffle following the election, he retained the Public Works portfolio. In addition, he succeeded Lawrence Cannon as Quebec Lieutenant. On January 19, 2010, in a cabinet shuffle, Prime Minister Harper appointed him Minister of Natural Resources. On May 18, 2011, in a cabinet shuffle he was appointed to be the Minister of Industry. On July 15, 2013, in a cabinet shuffle, he was appointed as Minister of International Development and Minister for La Francophonie.

On April 3, 2015, Paradis announced that he would not seek re-election.

== Federal politics ==
Paradis served as representative of the riding of Megantic-L'Érable from 2006 to 2015. He received nearly 50% of the vote in each federal election.

=== Secretary of State for Agriculture ===
Christian Paradis was appointed Secretary of State in charge of Agriculture on January 4, 2007. He notably inherited the dossier of the pork industry, plagued by difficulties due to numerous diseases affecting pig herds in Canada: his ministry takes support measures for producers by announcing financial assistance to producers over a period of 4 years.

Under his leadership, the Harper government launched a $1.5 billion program aimed at supporting the production of bio-fuels by farmers.

He also played a crucial role in preserving the Supply management (Canada) system during the development of Canadian cheese regulations in 2007.

=== Minister of Public Services and Procurement ===
He became Minister of Public Works and Government Services replacing Michael Fortier on June 25, 2008.

On November 27, he announced the return of Formula 1 to Canada, with the resumption of the Canadian Grand Prix in Montreal. The Ministry of Public Works contributes $5 million annually.

=== Quebec Lieutenant and Minister responsible for the Montreal region ===
He became Quebec lieutenant and Minister responsible for the Montreal region in November 2008, replacing Lawrence Cannon.

One of its main files is the regulation on the harmonization of the Canada-Quebec sales tax with the retrocession to the Government of Quebec of 2.2 billion dollars annually from the federal government coming from the Tax on products and services.

He led the electoral campaign in Quebec during the 2011 Canadian federal election; the Conservatives won 16.52% of the vote and overtook the Liberal Party of Canada in Quebec, but won only 5 seats out of 78, against a strong push from the NDP who won 59 seats.

=== Minister of Natural Resources ===
In March 2011, as Minister of Natural Resources, Minister Paradis in the company of Minister Normandeau announced that the governments of Canada and Quebec reached a historic agreement in principle for the co-management of the Old Harry hydrocarbon reservoir, located in the Gulf of St. Lawrence.

=== Minister of Industry ===
As Minister of Industry and therefore responsible for telecommunications, Minister Paradis stood up to the telecommunications industry, stressing the need for four national carriers to maintain competition in all regions of the country. He announced in March 2012, the lifting of restrictions on foreign ownership for smaller players in the wireless industry and in March 2013, he announced a new broadband wireless spectrum auction to enable access to new entrants and incumbents.

=== Minister for International Development and La Francophonie ===
He was appointed Minister of International Development and La Francophonie on July 15, 2013.

He supports the candidacy of the former Governor General of Canada, Michaëlle Jean and supports her successful campaign for the position of Secretary General of the Organisation internationale de la Francophonie.

== After politics ==
Since January 2016, the former minister of the Harper government has held the position of senior vice-president, strategic development of protective services in Canada at GardaWorld.

He sits on several boards of directors: Forum of Federations, Canada World Youth, Macdonald–Laurier Institute and Leomed Technologies.

== Electoral record ==
2011 Canadian federal election
| Party | Candidate | Votes | % | ±% | Expenditures |
|---|---|---|---|---|---|
| Conservative | Christian Paradis | 21,931 | 49.14 | +2.44 | |
| New Democratic | Cheryl Voisine | 11,716 | 26.25 | +16.79 | |
| Bloc Québécois | Pierre Turcotte | 7,481 | 16.76 | -10.96 | |
| Liberal | René Roy | 2,601 | 5.83 | -8.13 | |
| Green | Wyatt Tessari | 655 | 1.47 | -0.69 | |
| Canadian Action | Alain Bergeron | 250 | 0.56 | – | |
| Total valid votes/Expense limit | | 44,634 | 100.00 | | |
| Total rejected ballots | | 733 | 1.62 | | |
| Turnout | | 45,367 | 64.61 | | |

2008 Canadian federal election
| Party | Candidate | Votes | % | ±% | Expenditures |
|---|---|---|---|---|---|
| Conservative | Christian Paradis | 20,697 | 46.70 | -3.15 | $60,593 |
| Bloc Québécois | Pierre Turcotte | 12,283 | 27.72 | -4.90 | $49,764 |
| Liberal | Nicole Champagne | 6,185 | 13.96 | +3.56 | $7,283 |
| New Democratic | Bruno Vézina | 4,191 | 9.46 | +5.57 | $1,755 |
| Green | Jean-R. Guernon | 959 | 2.16 | -1.09 | |
| Total valid votes/Expense limit | | 44,315 | 100.00 | $81,095 | |
| Total rejected ballots | | 688 | 1.53 | | |
| Turnout | | 45,003 | 64.42 | | |

2006 Canadian federal election: Mégantic—L'Érable
| Party | Candidate | Votes | % | ±% | Expenditures |
|---|---|---|---|---|---|
| Conservative | Christian Paradis | 23,550 | 49.85 | +38.43 | $51,309 |
| Bloc Québécois | Marc Boulianne (incumbent) | 15,410 | 32.62 | -12.12 | $48,632 |
| Liberal | Yvan Corriveau | 4,912 | 10.40 | -26.25 | $19,371 |
| New Democratic | Isabelle Tremblay | 1,836 | 3.89 | +0.16 | $0.00 |
| Green | Jean François Hamel | 1,534 | 3.25 | -0.21 | none listed |
| Total valid votes/expense limit | | 47,242 | 100.00 | | $75,377 |
| Total rejected, unmarked and declined ballots | | 543 | 1.14 | | |
| Turnout | | 47,785 | 68.64 | +5.63 | |
| Electors on the lists | | 69,617 | | | |
Sources: Official Results, Elections Canada and Financial Returns, Elections Canada.

== Honours ==
- Member of the Queen's Privy Council for Canada(2007).
- Queen Elizabeth II Diamond Jubilee Medal (2012) presented by the Right Honorable David Lloyd Johnston

28th Canadian Ministry (2006–2015) – Cabinet of Stephen Harper
Cabinet posts (4)
| Predecessor | Office | Successor |
|---|---|---|
| Julian Fantino | Minister of International Development and La Francophonie; 2013–2015 | Marie-Claude Bibeau |
| Tony Clement | Minister of Industry; 2011–2013 | James Moore |
| Lisa Raitt | Minister of Natural Resources; 2010–2011 | Joe Oliver |
| Michael Fortier | Minister of Public Works and Government Services; 2008–2010 | Rona Ambrose |
Sub-Cabinet Post
| Predecessor | Title | Successor |
| New Portfolio | Secretary of State (Agriculture) (2007–2008) | Jean-Pierre Blackburn as Minister of State (Agriculture) |
