= Léopold Corriveau =

Canadian politician (1926–1998)

Member of Parliament for Frontenac
- In office 1970–1984
- Preceded by: Bernard Dumont
- Succeeded by: Marcel Masse

Personal details
- Born: 23 January 1926 Thetford Mines, Quebec, Canada
- Died: 16 July 1998 (aged 72) Thetford Mines, Quebec, Canada
- Party: Liberal
- Profession: Electrician

Léopold Corriveau (French pronunciation: [leɔpɔld kɔʁivo]; 23 January 1926 – 16 July 1998) was a Canadian politician of the Liberal Party who represented Frontenac in the House of Commons from 1970 to 1984. He was an electrician by trade.

== Career ==
Prior to his election to Parliament, Corriveau served as a member (1962–1967) and president (1967–1970) of Thetford Mines's School Board.

He was first elected in the Frontenac electoral district in a 16 November 1970 by-election following Bernard Dumont's resignation. He was re-elected in the 1972, 1974, 1979, and 1980 federal elections. In the 1984 federal election, he was defeated by Marcel Masse of the Progressive Conservative Party. Corriveau served for the later part of the 28th Canadian Parliament, and for full terms in the 29th through 32nd Canadian Parliaments. In Parliament he served as Parliamentary Secretary to the Minister of Agriculture.
