= Marie-Claude Bibeau =

Canadian politician (born 1970)

Her Worship the Honourable Marie-Claude Bibeau PC
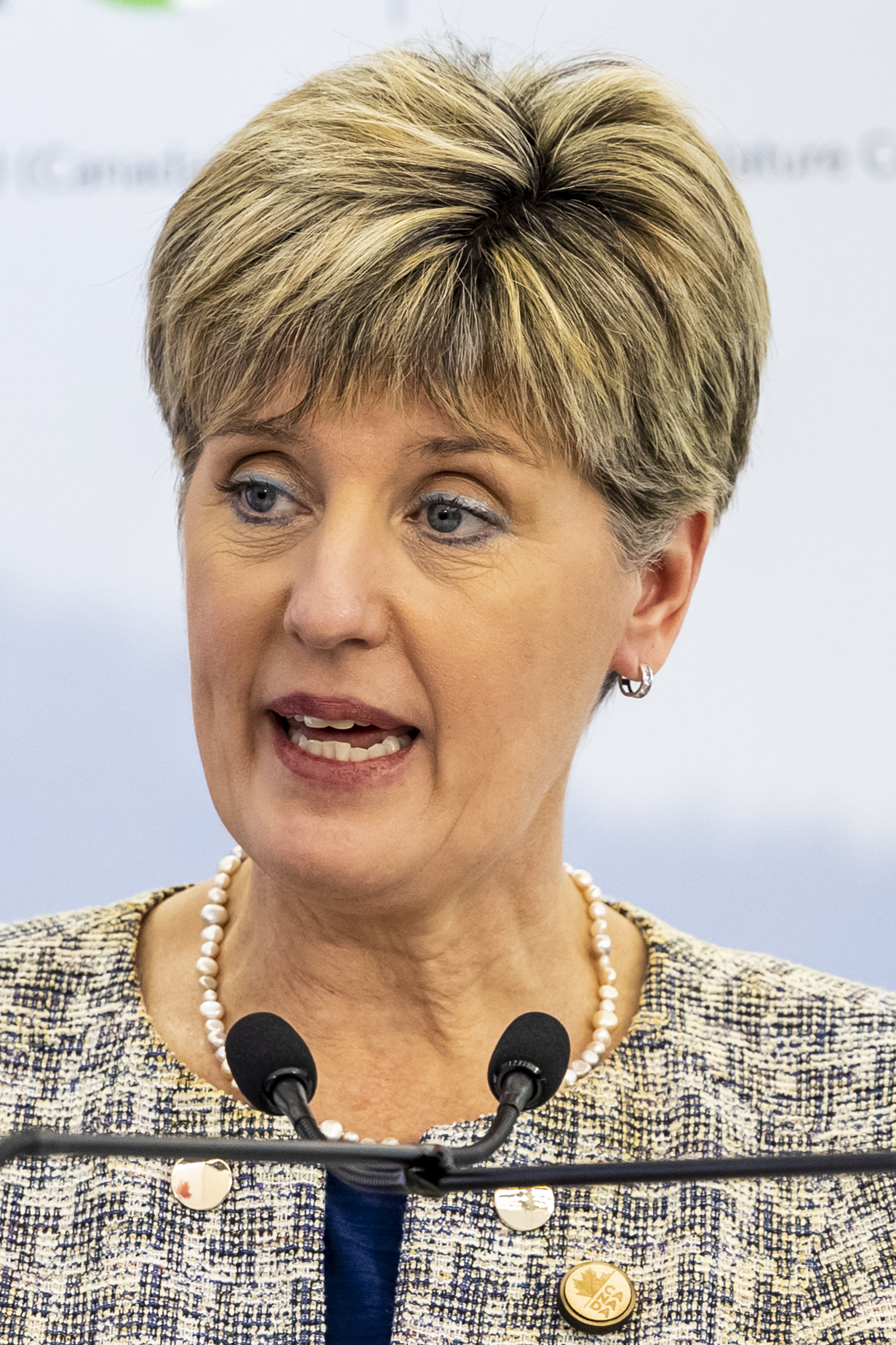
- Bibeau in 2022

Mayor of Sherbrooke
- Incumbent
- Assumed office November 12, 2025
- Preceded by: Évelyne Beaudin

Minister of National Revenue
- In office July 26, 2023 – December 20, 2024
- Prime Minister: Justin Trudeau
- Preceded by: Diane Lebouthillier
- Succeeded by: Élisabeth Brière

Minister of Agriculture and Agri-Food
- In office March 1, 2019 – July 26, 2023
- Prime Minister: Justin Trudeau
- Preceded by: Lawrence MacAulay
- Succeeded by: Lawrence MacAulay

Minister of International Development
- In office November 4, 2015 – March 1, 2019
- Prime Minister: Justin Trudeau
- Preceded by: Christian Paradis
- Succeeded by: Maryam Monsef

Minister responsible for La Francophonie
- In office November 4, 2015 – July 18, 2018
- Prime Minister: Justin Trudeau
- Preceded by: Christian Paradis
- Succeeded by: Mélanie Joly

Member of Parliament for Compton—Stanstead
- In office October 19, 2015 – March 23, 2025
- Preceded by: Jean Rousseau
- Succeeded by: Marianne Dandurand

Personal details
- Born: April 4, 1970 (age 56) Sherbrooke, Quebec, Canada
- Party: Independent (municipal); Liberal (federal)
- Spouse: Bernard Sévigny
- Education: Université de Sherbrooke

Marie-Claude Bibeau PC (French pronunciation: [maʁiklod bibo]; born April 4, 1970) is a Canadian politician who is the mayor of Sherbrooke, Quebec, since the 2025 municipal election. A member of the federal Liberal Party, she was elected to represent the riding of Compton—Stanstead in the House of Commons in the 2015 federal election.

== Early life ==
Bibeau was born and raised in Sherbrooke, Quebec, and earned a bachelor's degree in economics and a graduate diploma in environmental management from Université de Sherbrooke. Following her graduation, she worked for the Canadian International Development Agency, and was variously posted in Ottawa, Montreal, Morocco and Benin. After leaving the agency, she returned to the riding of Compton-Stanstead, and spent 15 years operating a successful tourism business.

== Political career ==
First elected in the 2015 Canadian federal election, Bibeau was appointed minister of international development and for La Francophonie in 2015. In her capacity as minister, she helped shape the Trudeau government's foreign policy. In September 2016, Bibeau was appointed by United Nations Secretary-General Ban Ki-moon to serve as member of the Lead Group of the Scaling Up Nutrition Movement. Also since 2016, she has been serving on the board of the Global Partnership to End Violence Against Children. In 2017, she served on the World Health Organization and Office of the United Nations High Commissioner for Human Rights's High-Level Working Group on the Health and Human Rights of Women, Children and Adolescents.

Bibeau then was appointed as the first female minister of agriculture in 2019. She was later appointed minister of national revenue in July 2023, remaining in that role until December 2024.

Bibeau did not seek re-election in the 2025 Canadian federal election and ran for mayor of Sherbrooke, Quebec. She won the mayoral race with 47.14% of the vote.

== Personal life ==
She is married to Bernard Sévigny, former mayor of Sherbrooke.

== Electoral record ==
2021 Canadian federal election: Compton—Stanstead
Party	Candidate	Votes	%	±%	Expenditures
Liberal	Marie-Claude Bibeau	21,188	36.66	-0.65	$63,618.47
Bloc Québécois	Nathalie Bresse	17,688	30.60	-1.28	$19,787.30
Conservative	Pierre Tremblay	10,087	17.45	+2.95	$42,471.76
New Democratic	Geneva Allen	4,277	7.40	-2.23	$0.48
People's	Yves Bourassa	2,167	3.75	+2.74	$0.00
Green	Sylvain Dodier	1,626	2.81	-2.41	$3,785.22
Free	Déitane Gendron	576	1.00	–	$296.27
Independent	Sylvain Longpré	187	0.32	–	none listed
Total valid votes/expense limit		57,796	–	–	$116,073.80
Total rejected ballots					
Turnout			66.49	-3.26	
Registered voters		86,926			
Liberal hold		Swing		+0.31	
Source: Elections Canada

2019 Canadian federal election: Compton—Stanstead
Party	Candidate	Votes	%	±%	Expenditures
Liberal	Marie-Claude Bibeau	21,731	37.31	+0.43	$58,382.52
Bloc Québécois	David Benoît	18,571	31.89	+11.19	none listed
Conservative	Jessy Mc Neil	8,446	14.50	+2.00	$12,725.62
New Democratic	Naomie Mathieu Chauvette	5,607	9.63	-17.78	$1,786.21
Green	Jean Rousseau	3,044	5.23	+3.29	none listed
People's	Paul Reed	586	1.01		$677.99
Rhinoceros	Jonathan Therrien	252	0.43	-0.13	$0.00
Total valid votes/expense limit		58,237	98.33		
Total rejected ballots		988	1.67		
Turnout		59,225	69.75		
Eligible voters		84,913			
Liberal hold		Swing		-5.39	
Source: Elections Canada

2015 Canadian federal election: Compton—Stanstead
Party	Candidate	Votes	%	±%	Expenditures
Liberal	Marie-Claude Bibeau	20,582	36.88	+24.89	$30,817.38
New Democratic	Jean Rousseau	15,300	27.41	-19.86	$22,398.05
Bloc Québécois	France Bonsant	11,551	20.70	-5.73	$41,452.44
Conservative	Gustavo Labrador	6,978	12.50	+0.65	$24,135.57
Green	Korie Marshall	1,085	1.94	-0.49	–
Rhinoceros	Kévin Côté	315	0.56	–	–
Total valid votes/Expense limit		55,811	100.00		$218,288.13
Total rejected ballots		748	1.32	–	
Turnout		56,559	69.09	–	
Eligible voters		81,867			
Liberal gain from New Democratic		Swing		+22.37	
Source: Elections Canada

29th Canadian Ministry (2015–2025) – Cabinet of Justin Trudeau
Cabinet posts (4)
Predecessor	Office	Successor
Diane Lebouthillier	Minister of National Revenue; July 26, 2023 – December 20, 2024	Élisabeth Brière
Lawrence MacAulay	Minister of Agriculture and Agri-Food; March 1, 2019 – July 26, 2023	Lawrence MacAulay
Christian Paradis	Minister of International Development; November 4, 2015 – March 1, 2019	Karina Gould
Christian Paradis	Minister responsible for La Francophonie; November 4, 2015 – July 18, 2018	Mélanie Joly
Parliament of Canada
Preceded by Jean Rousseau	Member of Parliament for Compton—Stanstead; October 19, 2015 – April 27, 2025	Succeeded by Marianne Dandurand
