= Gérard Binet =

Canadian politician (born 1955)

Member of the Canadian Parliament for Frontenac—Mégantic
- In office 2000–2004
- Preceded by: Jean-Guy Chrétien
- Succeeded by: District abolished

Personal details
- Born: November 11, 1955 (age 70) Thetford Mines, Quebec, Canada
- Party: Liberal

Gérard Binet (born November 11, 1955) is a politician from the Canadian province of Quebec. He was the Liberal Member of Parliament for the riding of Frontenac—Mégantic.

Born in Thetford Mines, Quebec, he was a businessman and draftsman before he was first elected in 2000. He lost to Marc Boulianne in the riding of Mégantic—L'Érable in 2004.
