= Jean Rousseau (politician) =

Canadian politician (born 1961)

Member of Parliament for Compton—Stanstead
- In office May 30, 2011 – August 2, 2015
- Preceded by: France Bonsant
- Succeeded by: Marie-Claude Bibeau

Personal details
- Born: June 23, 1961 (age 64) Asbestos, Quebec, Canada
- Party: Green (2016–present)
- Other political affiliations: New Democratic (formerly)

Jean Rousseau (French pronunciation: [ʒɑ̃ ʁuso]; born June 23, 1961) is a Canadian politician who was elected to the House of Commons of Canada in the 2011 election. He represented the electoral district of Compton—Stanstead as a member of the New Democratic Party. Rousseau was defeated in the 2015 Canadian federal election by Liberal Party of Canada candidate Marie-Claude Bibeau.

Prior to being elected, Rousseau was a worker in showbusiness. He studied in administration at the Cégep de Sherbrooke and has a Bachelor's degree in industrial relations from Université Laval.

Rosseau joined the Green Party in May 2016. He was the Green Party of Canada candidate in Compton—Stanstead for the 2019 Canadian federal election.

== Electoral record ==
2019 Canadian federal election: Compton—Stanstead
| Party | Candidate | Votes | % | ±% | Expenditures |
|---|---|---|---|---|---|
| Liberal | Marie-Claude Bibeau | 21,731 | 37.31 | +0.43 | $58,382.52 |
| Bloc Québécois | David Benoît | 18,571 | 31.89 | +11.19 | none listed |
| Conservative | Jessy Mc Neil | 8,446 | 14.50 | +2.00 | $12,725.62 |
| New Democratic | Naomie Mathieu Chauvette | 5,607 | 9.63 | -17.78 | $1,786.21 |
| Green | Jean Rousseau | 3,044 | 5.23 | +3.29 | none listed |
| People's | Paul Reed | 586 | 1.01 | | $677.99 |
| Rhinoceros | Jonathan Therrien | 252 | 0.43 | -0.13 | $0.00 |
| Total valid votes/expense limit | | 58,237 | 98.33 | | |
| Total rejected ballots | | 988 | 1.67 | | |
| Turnout | | 59,225 | 69.75 | | |
| Eligible voters | | 84,913 | | | |
| Liberal hold | | Swing | | -5.39 | |
Source: Elections Canada

2015 Canadian federal election: Compton—Stanstead
| Party | Candidate | Votes | % | ±% | Expenditures |
|---|---|---|---|---|---|
| Liberal | Marie-Claude Bibeau | 20,582 | 36.88 | +24.89 | $30,817.38 |
| New Democratic | Jean Rousseau | 15,300 | 27.41 | -19.86 | $22,398.05 |
| Bloc Québécois | France Bonsant | 11,551 | 20.70 | -5.73 | $41,452.44 |
| Conservative | Gustavo Labrador | 6,978 | 12.50 | +0.65 | $24,135.57 |
| Green | Korie Marshall | 1,085 | 1.94 | -0.49 | – |
| Rhinoceros | Kévin Côté | 315 | 0.56 | – | – |
| Total valid votes/Expense limit | | 55,811 | 100.00 | | $218,288.13 |
| Total rejected ballots | | 748 | 1.32 | – | |
| Turnout | | 56,559 | 69.09 | – | |
| Eligible voters | | 81,867 | | | |
| Liberal gain from New Democratic | | Swing | | +22.37 | |
Source: Elections Canada
