= Mégantic—L'Érable—Lotbinière =

Federal electoral district in Quebec, Canada

Coordinates: 45°55′N 71°15′W

Quebec electoral district
- Interactive map of riding boundaries from the 2025 federal election

Federal electoral district
- Legislature: House of Commons
MP
Luc Berthold
Conservative
- District created: 2003
- First contested: 2004
- Last contested: 2021
- District webpage: profile, map

Demographics
- Population (2016): 87,233
- Electors (2019): 70,683
- Area (km²): 6,278
- Pop. density (per km²): 13.9
- Census division(s): L'Érable, Le Granit, Les Appalaches, Lotbinière
- Census subdivision(s): Thetford-Mines, Plessisville, Princeville, Lac-Mégantic, Adstock, Laurier-Station, Sainte-Croix, Disraeli, East-Broughton, Saint-Ferdinand

Mégantic—L'Érable—Lotbinière (formerly Mégantic—L'Érable) is a federal electoral district (riding) in Quebec, Canada, that has been represented in the House of Commons since 2004.

Its member of Parliament (MP) has been Luc Berthold of the Conservative Party since 2015.

== Geography ==
Straddling the Quebec regions of Centre-du-Québec, Chaudière-Appalaches and Estrie, it consists of the regional county municipalities of Les Appalaches, L'Érable, Le Granit, as well as the territory of the former municipality of Courcelles. Notable towns include Thetford Mines, Plessisville and Lac-Mégantic.

The neighbouring ridings are Compton—Stanstead, Richmond—Arthabaska—des-Sources, Bécancour—Nicolet—Saurel—Alnôbak, Saint-Augustin—Portneuf—Jacques-Cartier, Lévis—Lotbinière, and Beauce.

Its population is 87,078, including 69,617 voters, and it covers an area of 5,912 km^{2}.

== History ==
The riding was created as Mégantic—L'Érable in 2003 from parts of Frontenac—Mégantic and Lotbinière—L'Érable ridings.

The 2012 electoral redistribution saw this riding gain territory from Beauce and lose a small fraction of territory to Lévis—Lotbinière.

The riding was renamed Mégantic—L'Érable—Lotbinière by the 2023 representation order for Quebec, which came into effect before the 2025 federal election. In the process, it gained the municipalities of Dosquet, Laurier-Station, Leclercville, Lotbinière, Notre-Dame-du-Sacré-Coeur-d'Issoudun, Sainte-Agathe-de-Lotbinière, Sainte-Croix, Saint-Édouard-de-Lotbinière, Saint-Flavien, Saint-Janvier-de-Joly and Val-Alain from Lévis—Lotbinière.

=== Members of Parliament ===
This riding has elected the following members of Parliament:

Parliament	Years	Member	Party
Mégantic—L'Érable; Riding created from Frontenac—Mégantic and Lotbinière—L'Érable
38th	2004–2006	Marc Boulianne	Bloc Québécois
39th	2006–2008	Christian Paradis	Conservative
40th	2008–2011	Christian Paradis	Conservative
41st	2011–2015	Christian Paradis	Conservative
42nd	2015–2019	Luc Berthold	Conservative
43rd	2019–2021	Luc Berthold	Conservative
44th	2021–2025	Luc Berthold	Conservative
Mégantic—L'Érable—Lotbinière
45th	2025–present	Luc Berthold	Conservative

== Election results ==
=== Mégantic—L'Érable—Lotbinière ===
2025 Canadian federal election
Party	Candidate	Votes	%	±%	Expenditures
Conservative	Luc Berthold	34,418	58.73	+2.47	$50,857.75
Liberal	Charles McKaig	12,585	21.47	+7.84	$8,715.31
Bloc Québécois	Réjean Hurteau	9,579	16.34	–3.73	$11,025.52
New Democratic	Gabriel D'Astous	1,086	1.85	–0.97	$0.00
People's	Marek Spacek	716	1.22	–2.39	$1,204.34
Christian Heritage	Yves Gilbert	224	0.38	N/A	$300.00
Total valid votes/expense limit		–	–	–	$131,204.27
Total rejected ballots		–	–		
Turnout		58,608	69.06		
Eligible voters		84,864			
Conservative hold		Swing		–2.69	
Source: Elections Canada

=== Mégantic—L'Érable ===
2021 federal election redistributed results
Party	Vote	%
Conservative	30,416	56.71
Bloc Québécois	10,518	19.61
Liberal	7,240	13.50
People's	1,888	3.52
New Democratic	1,675	3.12
Green	703	1.31
Others	1,199	2.24

2021 Canadian federal election: Mégantic—L'Érable
Party	Candidate	Votes	%	±%	Expenditures
Conservative	Luc Berthold	26,121	56.3	+7.1	$54,323.16
Bloc Québécois	Éric Labonté	9,318	20.1	-5.7	$15,275.53
Liberal	Adam Lukofsky	6,329	13.6	-2.0	$13,729.57
People's	Jonathan Gagnon	1,677	3.6	+1.9	$0.00
New Democratic	Mathieu Boisvert	1,308	2.8	-1.3	$0.48
Free	Real Pepin	680	1.5	N/A	$1,772.40
Green	Emilie Hamel	592	1.3	-1.3	$0.00
Independent	Gloriane Blais	403	0.9	N/A	$8,124.07
Total valid votes/expense limit		46,428	98.3	–	$107,531.72
Total rejected ballots		785	1.7		
Turnout		47,213	65.4		
Registered voters		72,179			
Conservative hold		Swing		+6.4	
Source: Elections Canada

2019 Canadian federal election: Mégantic—L'Érable
Party	Candidate	Votes	%	±%	Expenditures
Conservative	Luc Berthold	23,392	49.2	+13.78	$46,958.47
Bloc Québécois	Priscilla Corbeil	12,249	25.8	+13.45	$4,851.59
Liberal	Isabelle Grégoire	7,388	15.6	-12.54	$15,319.47
New Democratic	Mathieu Boisvert	1,936	4.1	-17.86	none listed
Green	Nicole Charette	1,258	2.6	+0.47	$0.00
People's	Marie Claude Lauzier	812	1.7		$1,571.93
Rhinoceros	Damien Roy	256	0.5		none listed
Independent	Jean Paradis	217	0.5		$15,319.47
Total valid votes/expense limit		47,508	100.0		
Total rejected ballots		898			
Turnout		48,406	68.5		
Eligible voters		70,683			
Conservative hold		Swing		+0.17	
Source: Elections Canada

2015 Canadian federal election: Mégantic—L'Érable
Party	Candidate	Votes	%	±%	Expenditures
Conservative	Luc Berthold	16,749	35.42	-13.72	$80,017.18
Liberal	David Berthiaume	13,308	28.14	+22.17	$15,610.11
New Democratic	Jean-François Delisle	10,386	21.96	-4.30	$59,606.77
Bloc Québécois	Virginie Provost	5,838	12.35	-4.26	$4,049.48
Green	Justin Gervais	1,006	2.13	+0.65	–
Total valid votes/expense limit		47,287	100.0		$204,975.86
Total rejected ballots		941	–	–	
Turnout		48,228	67.4%	–	
Eligible voters		71,469			
Conservative hold		Swing		-17.94	
Source: Elections Canada

2011 federal election redistributed results
Party	Vote	%
Conservative	22,321	49.14
New Democratic	11,929	26.26
Bloc Québécois	7,542	16.61
Liberal	2,711	5.97
Green	667	1.47
Others	250	0.55

2011 Canadian federal election
Party	Candidate	Votes	%	±%	Expenditures
Conservative	Christian Paradis	21,931	49.14	+2.44	
New Democratic	Cheryl Voisine	11,716	26.25	+16.79	
Bloc Québécois	Pierre Turcotte	7,481	16.76	-10.96	
Liberal	René Roy	2,601	5.83	-8.13	
Green	Wyatt Tessari	655	1.47	-0.69	
Canadian Action	Alain Bergeron	250	0.56	–	
Total valid votes/expense limit		44,634	100.00		
Total rejected ballots		733	1.62		
Turnout		45,367	64.61		

2008 Canadian federal election
Party	Candidate	Votes	%	±%	Expenditures
Conservative	Christian Paradis	20,697	46.70	-3.15	$60,593
Bloc Québécois	Pierre Turcotte	12,283	27.72	-4.90	$49,764
Liberal	Nicole Champagne	6,185	13.96	+3.56	$7,283
New Democratic	Bruno Vézina	4,191	9.46	+5.57	$1,755
Green	Jean-R. Guernon	959	2.16	-1.09	
Total valid votes/expense limit		44,315	100.00	$81,095	
Total rejected ballots		688	1.53		
Turnout		45,003	64.42		

2006 Canadian federal election: Mégantic—L'Érable
Party	Candidate	Votes	%	±%	Expenditures
Conservative	Christian Paradis	23,550	49.85	+38.43	$51,309
Bloc Québécois	Marc Boulianne (incumbent)	15,410	32.62	-12.12	$48,632
Liberal	Yvan Corriveau	4,912	10.40	-26.25	$19,371
New Democratic	Isabelle Tremblay	1,836	3.89	+0.16	$0.00
Green	Jean François Hamel	1,534	3.25	-0.21	none listed
Total valid votes/expense limit		47,242	100.00		$75,377
Total rejected, unmarked and declined ballots		543	1.14		
Turnout		47,785	68.64	+5.63	
Electors on the lists		69,617			
Sources: Official Results, Elections Canada and Financial Returns, Elections Canada.

2004 Canadian federal election
Party	Candidate	Votes	%	±%	Expenditures
Bloc Québécois	Marc Boulianne	19,264	44.74	–	$44,288
Liberal	Gérard Binet	15,778	36.65	–	$67,467
Conservative	Yves Mailly	4,916	11.42	–	$14,915
New Democratic	Alexandre Côté	1,608	3.73	–	$970
Green	Bruno Vézina	1,489	3.46	–	$0
Total valid votes		43,055	100.00	–	$73,642
Total rejected ballots		868	1.98		
Turnout		43,923	63.01		

== See also ==
- List of Canadian electoral districts
- Historical federal electoral districts of Canada
