= Alain Tardif =

Canadian politician

Member of the Canadian Parliament for Richmond—Wolfe
- In office 1979–1988
- Preceded by: Léonel Beaudoin
- Succeeded by: Yvon Côté

Personal details
- Born: 23 August 1946 (age 79) Asbestos, Quebec
- Party: Liberal

Alain Tardif (born 23 August 1946) was a Liberal party member of the House of Commons of Canada. He was a lawyer by career.

Born in Asbestos, Quebec, Tardif was elected in the 1979 federal election at the Richmond electoral district. He was re-elected in the 1980 and 1984 federal elections, the latter when his riding became known as Richmond—Wolfe. In 1984 he was one of the few Liberals not swept up in the massive Progressive Conservative wave that year; he was one of only five Liberals in the entire province elected from outside the Montreal area. He was defeated in the 1988 federal election by Tory challenger Yvon Côté. He served in the 31st, 32nd and 33rd Canadian Parliaments.
