= Jean-Guy Chrétien =

Canadian politician

Jean-Guy Chrétien (born 23 January 1946) is a former Canadian politician. Chrétien served in the House of Commons of Canada from 1993 to 2000. He is a professor and farmer by career.

Born in Coleraine, Quebec, Chrétien was elected in the Frontenac electoral district under the Bloc Québécois party in the 1993 federal election. He was re-elected in 1997 under the restructured territory of the Frontenac—Mégantic riding. Chrétien served in the 35th and 36th Canadian Parliaments but left Canadian politics after losing his riding to Liberal candidate Gérard Binet in the 2000 federal election.

Parliament of Canada
Preceded by Marcel Masse	Member of Parliament for Frontenac; 1993–1997	Succeeded by The electoral district was abolished in 1996.
Preceded by The electoral district was created in 1996.	Member of Parliament for Frontenac—Mégantic; 1997–2000	Succeeded by Gérard Binet
