= David Price (Canadian politician) =

Canadian businessman and politician

The Honourable David Price PC

Member of Parliament for Compton—Stanstead
- In office 2 June 1997 – 28 June 2004
- Preceded by: riding created
- Succeeded by: France Bonsant

Personal details
- Born: 2 June 1945 (age 80) Sherbrooke, Quebec, Canada
- Party: Progressive Conservative (1997-2000); Liberal (2000-2004)

David W. Price, PC (born 2 June 1945) is a Canadian businessman and politician. Price was a member of the House of Commons of Canada from 1997 to 2004, serving in the 36th and 37th Canadian Parliaments.

== Biography ==
Born in Sherbrooke, Quebec, Price ran his own electrical company before being elected mayor of Lennoxville, Quebec in 1994. He served as mayor until he resigned to run in federal politics in 1997.

He was elected in the Compton—Stanstead electoral district for the Progressive Conservative Party in the 1997 federal election.

After switching allegiance to the Liberal Party, he was re-elected in the 2000 general election. He was defeated in the following election in 2004 by France Bonsant of the Bloc Québécois. Price attempted to re-enter Parliament, again as a Liberal, but was again defeated by Bonsant in the 2006 election.

In the Quebec municipal elections on 1 November 2009, Price was elected president of the Lennoxville borough of Sherbrooke.
