= Frontenac (Quebec federal electoral district) =

Former federal electoral district in Quebec, Canada

Quebec electoral district

Defunct federal electoral district
- Legislature: House of Commons
- District created: 1966
- District abolished: 1996
- First contested: 1968
- Last contested: 1993

Frontenac (French pronunciation: [fʁɔ̃tnak]) was a federal electoral district in Quebec, Canada, which was represented in the House of Commons from 1968 to 1997.

This riding was created in 1966 from parts of Lotbinière and Mégantic ridings. It was abolished in 1996 when it was redistributed into Beauce and Frontenac—Mégantic ridings.

== Geography ==
It initially consisted of:

- the City of Thetford Mines;
- the Towns of Black Lake and Plessisville;
- the County of Mégantic;
- in the County of Frontenac: the village municipality of La Guadeloupe; the parish municipality of Courcelles; the municipalities of Saint-Évariste-de-Forsyth and Saint-Méthode-de-Frontenac;
- in the County of Beauce: the village municipality of East Broughton Station; the parish municipalities of Sacré-Coeur-de-Jésus and Sainte-Clothilde; the municipalities of East Broughton and Saint-Pierre-de-Broughton.

In 1976, it was redefined to consist of:

- the City of Thetford Mines;
- the Towns of Black Lake and Plessisville;
- the County of Mégantic;
- in the County of Beauce: the village municipality of East Broughton Station; the parish municipalities of Sacré-Coeur-de-Jésus and Sainte-Clothilde; the municipalities of East Broughton and Saint-Pierre-de-Broughton.
- in the County of Frontenac: the village municipality of La Guadeloupe; the parish municipality of Courcelles; the municipalities of Saint-Évariste-de-Forsyth and Saint-Méthode-de-Frontenac;
- in the County of Lotbinère: the village municipalities of Sainte-Agathe and Saint-Sylvestre; the parish municipalities of Sainte-Agathe and Saint-Sylvestre.

In 1987, it was redefined to consist of:

- the towns of Black Lake, Plessisville and Thetford Mines;
- the County of Mégantic;
- in the County of Beauce: the Village Municipality of East-Broughton-Station; the Parish Municipality of Sacré-Coeur-de-Jésus; the municipalities of East Broughton, Sainte-Clotilde-de-Beauce and Saint-Pierre-de-Broughton;
- in the County of Frontenac: the Municipality of Saint-Méthode-de-Frontenac;
- in the County of Lotbibière the village municipalities of Sainte-Agathe and Saint-Sylvestre; the parish municipalities of Sainte-Agathe and Saint-Sylvestre.

== Members of Parliament ==
This riding elected the following members of Parliament:

Parliament	Years	Member	Party
Frontenac; Riding created from Lotbinière and Mégantic
28th	1968–1970	Bernard Dumont	Ralliement créditiste
28th	1970–1972	Léopold Corriveau	Liberal
29th	1972–1974	Léopold Corriveau	Liberal
30th	1974–1979	Léopold Corriveau	Liberal
31st	1979–1980	Léopold Corriveau	Liberal
32nd	1980–1984	Léopold Corriveau	Liberal
33rd	1984–1988	Marcel Masse	Progressive Conservative
34th	1988–1993	Marcel Masse	Progressive Conservative
35th	1993–1997	Jean-Guy Chrétien	Bloc Québécois
Riding dissolved into Beauce and Frontenac—Mégantic

== Election results ==
1968 Canadian federal election
Party	Candidate	Votes
Ralliement créditiste	Bernard Dumont	12,298
Liberal	Gaëtan Théberge	9,863
Progressive Conservative	André Paul	3,510
New Democratic	Claude Lafleur	1,231

By-election: On Mr. Dumont's resignation, 6 April 1970

By-election on 16 November 1970
Party	Candidate	Votes
Liberal	Léopold Corriveau	13,404
Ralliement créditiste	Michel Champagne	7,721
Progressive Conservative	Victor Paul	2,154

1972 Canadian federal election
Party	Candidate	Votes
Liberal	Léopold Corriveau	12,014
Social Credit	Nelson-O. Lessard	11,950
Progressive Conservative	Benoît Cyr	5,635

1974 Canadian federal election
Party	Candidate	Votes
Liberal	Léopold Corriveau	14,236
Social Credit	Thérèse Mercier	10,000
Progressive Conservative	Daniel Bélec	2,667
New Democratic	Adrien Paquet	2,032

1979 Canadian federal election
Party	Candidate	Votes
Liberal	Léopold Corriveau	17,024
Social Credit	Jean-Louis Béland	11,582
Progressive Conservative	Georges Henri Cloutier	7,140
New Democratic	Martin Vaillancourt	492
Rhinoceros	Robert Couillard de Lépinay	429
Union populaire	Gaston Beaudoin	173
Marxist–Leninist	Jean-Daniel Nolin	63

Due to the death of Social Credit candidate Nelson Lassard, the 1980 general election scheduled for February 18 was postponed until March 24.

1980 Canadian federal election
Party	Candidate	Votes
Liberal	Léopold Corriveau	14,745
Social Credit	Fabien Roy	10,328
Progressive Conservative	Yves Lauzon	4,922
New Democratic	Jean-Denis Lavigne	1,693
Not affiliated	Hugues Gilbert	202
Independent	John Turmel	101
Independent	Patricia Métivier	92
Marxist–Leninist	Jean-Daniel Nolin	46

1984 Canadian federal election
Party	Candidate	Votes
Progressive Conservative	Marcel Masse	28,246
Liberal	Léopold Corriveau	9,154
New Democratic	Rita Bouchard	1,081
Rhinoceros	Pierre Fournier	823
Parti nationaliste	Richard Houle	386

1988 Canadian federal election
Party	Candidate	Votes
Progressive Conservative	Marcel Masse	25,872
Liberal	Réal Patry	6,978
New Democratic	Claude L'Heureux	1,785
Green	Jean Guernon	511

1993 Canadian federal election
Party	Candidate	Votes
Bloc Québécois	Jean-Guy Chrétien	18,603
Liberal	Jean-Guy Jam	6,984
Progressive Conservative	Jean-Claude Nadeau	5,017
Green	Jean-René Guernon	359
New Democratic	Joseph Bowman	332
Abolitionist	John Turmel	195

== See also ==
- List of Canadian electoral districts
- Historical federal electoral districts of Canada
