= Marc Boulianne =

Canadian politician

Member of Parliament for Mégantic—L'Érable
- In office June 28, 2004 – January 23, 2006
- Preceded by: Gérard Binet
- Succeeded by: Christian Paradis

Member of the National Assembly of Quebec for Frontenac
- In office November 30, 1998 – April 14, 2003
- Preceded by: Roger Lefebvre
- Succeeded by: Laurent Lessard

Personal details
- Born: October 9, 1941 (age 85) Tadoussac, Quebec, Canada
- Party: Parti Québécois; Bloc Québécois
- Profession: Professor

Marc Boulianne (born October 9, 1941) is a Canadian politician, political assistant and former teacher.

Born in Tadoussac, Quebec, he began his political career with the Parti Québécois, serving as a Member of the National Assembly of Quebec from 1998 to 2003 for the riding of Frontenac. From 2002 to 2003 he held the position of Parliamentary Assistant to the Minister of State for Social Solidarity and Child and Family Welfare and in 2003 he was Minister Responsible for the Status of Women under the Bernard Landry government.

Prior to entering politics, Boulianne was a history and economics teacher with the Black Lake-Disraeli school board from 1969 to 1993 and 1996 to 1997. He was also professor of history and economics at Thetford Mines College in 1975.

Boulianne represented the Bloc Québécois in the House of Commons of Canada as a Member of Parliament for the riding of Mégantic—L'Érable, after being elected in the 2004 Canadian federal election until his defeat in 2006. He was a member of the House of Commons Standing Committee on Access to Information, Privacy and Ethics and the Standing Joint Committee on the Library of Parliament, during the 38th Canadian Parliament..
