= Compton—Stanstead =

Federal electoral district in Quebec, Canada

Coordinates: 45°18′N 71°38′W

Quebec electoral district
- Interactive map of riding boundaries from the 2025 federal election

Federal electoral district
- Legislature: House of Commons
MP
Marianne Dandurand
Liberal
- District created: 1996
- First contested: 1997
- Last contested: 2025
- District webpage: profile, map

Demographics
- Population (2016): 105,459
- Electors (2019): 84,383
- Area (km²): 4,815
- Pop. density (per km²): 21.9
- Census division(s): Coaticook RCM, Le Haut-Saint-François RCM, Memphrémagog RCM, Sherbrooke, Le Val-Saint-François RCM
- Census subdivision(s): Sherbrooke (part), Coaticook, Cookshire-Eaton, East-Angus, Ascot-Corner, Compton, Stanstead, Sainte-Catherine-de-Hatley, Weedon, Waterville

Compton—Stanstead is a federal electoral district in Quebec, Canada, that has been represented in the House of Commons of Canada since 1997.

It was created in 1996 from Mégantic—Compton—Stanstead and Richmond—Wolfe ridings.

== Demographics ==
According to the 2021 Canadian census, 2023 representation order

Race: 94.6% White, 2.0% Indigenous
Languages: 87.4% French, 11.5% English
Religions: 68.3% Christian (58.3% Catholic, 1.5% Anglican, 1.0% United Church, 7.5% Other) 30.3% None
Median income: $41,200 (2020)
Average income: $48,960 (2020)

== Geography ==
The southern Quebec riding on the US border southeast of Sherbrooke is located in the Quebec region of Estrie. It consists of the RCMs of Coaticook and Le Haut-Saint-François, the eastern half of Memphrémagog, and parts of Le Val-Saint-François and the city of Sherbrooke.

Main towns include Coaticook, Lennoxville (now part of Sherbrooke), North Hatley, Stanstead, and Ayer's Cliff.

Neighbouring ridings are Brome—Missisquoi, Richmond—Arthabaska—des-Sources, Sherbrooke, and Mégantic—L'Érable—Lotbinière.

The 2012 electoral redistribution saw this riding lose and gain territories with Sherbrooke.

Following the 2022 Canadian federal electoral redistribution, the riding gained the Parc-Belvédère area from Sherbrooke.

== Members of Parliament ==
This riding has elected the following members of Parliament:

Parliament	Years	Member	Party
Compton—Stanstead; Riding created from Mégantic—Compton—Stanstead and Richmond—Wolfe
36th	1997–2000	David Price	Progressive Conservative
37th	2000–2004	David Price	Liberal
38th	2004–2006	France Bonsant	Bloc Québécois
39th	2006–2008	France Bonsant	Bloc Québécois
40th	2008–2011	France Bonsant	Bloc Québécois
41st	2011–2015	Jean Rousseau	New Democratic
42nd	2015–2019	Marie-Claude Bibeau	Liberal
43rd	2019–2021	Marie-Claude Bibeau	Liberal
44th	2021–2025	Marie-Claude Bibeau	Liberal
45th	2025–present	Marianne Dandurand	Liberal

== Election results ==
2025 Canadian federal election
Party	Candidate	Votes	%	±%	Expenditures
Liberal	Marianne Dandurand	29,951	45.64	+8.98	$60,494.66
Bloc Québécois	Nathalie Bresse	17,305	26.37	–4.14	$12,025.89
Conservative	Jacques Painchaud	14,292	21.78	+4.37	$15,661.65
New Democratic	Valérie Laliberté	2,124	3.24	–4.30	$251.94
Green	Sébastien Tremblay	1,161	1.77	–1.04	$0.00
People's	Paul Lehmann	787	1.20	–2.56	$9,336.56
Total valid votes		65,620	98.72	+0.45	$138,336.72
Total rejected ballots		849	1.28	-0.45	
Turnout		66,469	71.82	+4.57	
Eligible voters		92,551			
Liberal notional hold		Swing		+6.56	
Source: Elections Canada
Note: number of eligible voters does not include voting day registrations.

2021 federal election redistributed results
Party	Vote	%
Liberal	21,556	36.66
Bloc Québécois	17,941	30.51
Conservative	10,239	17.41
New Democratic	4,431	7.54
People's	2,212	3.76
Green	1,650	2.81
Free	585	0.99
Independent	186	0.32
Total valid votes	58,800	98.27
Rejected ballots	1,036	1.73
Registered voters/ estimated turnout	88,975	67.25

2021 Canadian federal election
Party	Candidate	Votes	%	±%	Expenditures
Liberal	Marie-Claude Bibeau	21,188	36.66	-0.65	$63,618.47
Bloc Québécois	Nathalie Bresse	17,688	30.60	-1.28	$19,787.30
Conservative	Pierre Tremblay	10,087	17.45	+2.95	$42,471.76
New Democratic	Geneva Allen	4,277	7.40	-2.23	$0.48
People's	Yves Bourassa	2,167	3.75	+2.74	$0.00
Green	Sylvain Dodier	1,626	2.81	-2.41	$3,785.22
Free	Déitane Gendron	576	1.00	–	$296.27
Independent	Sylvain Longpré	187	0.32	–	none listed
Total valid votes/expense limit		57,796	–	–	$116,073.80
Total rejected ballots					
Turnout			66.49	-3.26	
Registered voters		86,926			
Liberal hold		Swing		+0.31	
Source: Elections Canada

2019 Canadian federal election
Party	Candidate	Votes	%	±%	Expenditures
Liberal	Marie-Claude Bibeau	21,731	37.31	+0.43	$58,382.52
Bloc Québécois	David Benoît	18,571	31.89	+11.19	none listed
Conservative	Jessy Mc Neil	8,446	14.50	+2.00	$12,725.62
New Democratic	Naomie Mathieu Chauvette	5,607	9.63	-17.78	$1,786.21
Green	Jean Rousseau	3,044	5.23	+3.29	none listed
People's	Paul Reed	586	1.01		$677.99
Rhinoceros	Jonathan Therrien	252	0.43	-0.13	$0.00
Total valid votes/expense limit		58,237	98.33		
Total rejected ballots		988	1.67		
Turnout		59,225	69.75		
Eligible voters		84,913			
Liberal hold		Swing		-5.39	
Source: Elections Canada

2015 Canadian federal election
Party	Candidate	Votes	%	±%	Expenditures
Liberal	Marie-Claude Bibeau	20,582	36.88	+24.89	$30,817.38
New Democratic	Jean Rousseau	15,300	27.41	-19.86	$22,398.05
Bloc Québécois	France Bonsant	11,551	20.70	-5.73	$41,452.44
Conservative	Gustavo Labrador	6,978	12.50	+0.65	$24,135.57
Green	Korie Marshall	1,085	1.94	-0.49	–
Rhinoceros	Kévin Côté	315	0.56	–	–
Total valid votes/expense limit		55,811	100.00		$218,288.13
Total rejected ballots		748	1.32	–	
Turnout		56,559	69.09	–	
Eligible voters		81,867			
Liberal gain from New Democratic		Swing		+22.37	
Source: Elections Canada

2011 federal election redistributed results
Party	Vote	%
New Democratic	23,529	47.27
Bloc Québécois	13,155	26.43
Liberal	5,970	11.99
Conservative	5,901	11.86
Green	1,211	2.43
Others	5	0.01

2011 Canadian federal election
Party	Candidate	Votes	%	±%	Expenditures
New Democratic	Jean Rousseau	24,097	47.59	+36.31	
Bloc Québécois	France Bonsant	13,179	26.03	15.82	
Liberal	William Hogg	6,132	12.09	-10.44	
Conservative	Sandrine Gressard Bélanger	5,982	11.72	-7.72	
Green	Gary Caldwell	1,241	2.57	-2.30	
Total valid votes/expense limit		50,631	100.00		
Total rejected ballots		580	1.13	-0.03	
Turnout		51,211	64.59	+2.61	
Eligible voters		80,382	–	–	

2008 Canadian federal election
Party	Candidate	Votes	%	±%	Expenditures
Bloc Québécois	France Bonsant	20,332	41.85	-0.9	$42,534
Liberal	William Hogg	10,946	22.53	+0.2	$17,476
Conservative	Michel Gagné	9,445	19.44	-4.9	$57,862
New Democratic	Jean Rousseau	5,483	11.28	+5.1	$1,820
Green	Gary Caldwell	2,368	4.87	+0.5	$11,114
Total valid votes/expense limit		48,574	100.00	$84,153	
Total rejected ballots		572	1.16		
Turnout		49,146	62.97		

2006 Canadian federal election
Party	Candidate	Votes	%	±%	Expenditures
Bloc Québécois	France Bonsant	21,316	42.8	-3.9	$38,909
Conservative	Gary Caldwell	12,131	24.3	+13.9	$44,452
Liberal	David Price	11,126	22.3	-13.7	$56,653
New Democratic	Stéphane Bürgi	3,099	6.2	+2.9	$1,674
Green	Gaétan Perreault	2,171	4.4	+0.8	$310
Total valid votes/Expense limit		49,843	100.0	$77,428	

2004 Canadian federal election
Party	Candidate	Votes	%	±%	Expenditures
Bloc Québécois	France Bonsant	20,450	46.7	+7.8	$36,450
Liberal	David Price	15,752	36.0	-10.6	$55,575
Conservative	Gary Caldwell	4,589	10.5	-1.3	$13,713
Green	Laurier Busque	1,546	3.5		$540
New Democratic	Martin Baller	1,451	3.3	+1.8	
Total valid votes/expense limit		43,788	100.0	$75,354	

Note: Conservative vote is compared to the total of the Canadian Alliance vote and Progressive Conservative vote in the 2000 election.

2000 Canadian federal election
Party	Candidate	Votes	%	±%
Liberal	David Price	17,729	46.6	+26.6
Bloc Québécois	Gaston Leroux	14,808	38.9	+6.0
Progressive Conservative	Mary Ann Dewey-Plante	2,422	6.4	-38.2
Alliance	Marc Carrier	2,061	5.4	
New Democratic	Christine Moore	580	1.5	+0.1
Natural Law	Marc Roy	476	1.3	+0.2
Total valid votes		38,076	100.0	

1997 Canadian federal election
Party	Candidate	Votes	%
Progressive Conservative	David Price	18,125	44.6
Bloc Québécois	Maurice Bernier	13,367	32.9
Liberal	Gaétan Grenier	8,119	20.0
New Democratic	Christine Moore	587	1.4
Natural Law	Lisette Proulx	439	1.1
Total valid votes		40,637	100.0

== See also ==
- List of Canadian electoral districts
- Historical federal electoral districts of Canada
