= Gaston Leroux (politician) =

Canadian politician

Gaston Leroux (born 1 October 1948) was a member of the House of Commons of Canada from 1993 to 1997. His career background includes consulting and comedy performance. He was born in Montreal, Quebec.

He was elected in the Richmond—Wolfe electoral district under the Bloc Québécois party in the 1993 federal election, thus serving in the 35th Canadian Parliament. Due to 1996 riding boundary realignments, Leroux campaigned in the 1997 federal election at the Richmond—Arthabaska electoral district but was defeated by Progressive Conservative André Bachand.

He made another unsuccessful bid to return to Canadian Parliament in the 2000 federal election at the Compton—Stanstead riding.
