= List of members of the Canadian House of Commons (W) =

== Wad–Wal ==
- Ian Waddell b. 1942 first elected in 1979 as New Democratic Party member for Vancouver Kingsway, British Columbia.
- Jean Casselman Wadds b. 1920 first elected in 1958 as Progressive Conservative member for Grenville—Dundas, Ontario.
- Fletcher Bath Wade b. 1852 first elected in 1900 as Liberal member for Annapolis, Nova Scotia.
- John Chipman Wade b. 1817 first elected in 1878 as Conservative member for Digby, Nova Scotia.
- Cathay Wagantall b. 1956 first elected in 2015 as Conservative member for Yorkton—Melville, Saskatchewan.
- Claude Wagner b. 1925 first elected in 1972 as Progressive Conservative member for Saint-Hyacinthe, Quebec.
- Ian Grant Wahn b. 1916 first elected in 1962 as Liberal member for St. Paul's, Ontario.
- Sam Wakim b. 1937 first elected in 1979 as Progressive Conservative member for Don Valley East, Ontario.
- John Waldie b. 1833 first elected in 1887 as Liberal member for Halton, Ontario.
- David Walker b. 1947 first elected in 1988 as Liberal member for Winnipeg North Centre, Manitoba.
- David James Walker b. 1905 first elected in 1957 as Progressive Conservative member for Rosedale, Ontario.
- Henry Joseph Walker b. 1849 first elected in 1911 as Conservative member for Northumberland East, Ontario.
- James Edgar Walker b. 1911 first elected in 1962 as Liberal member for York Centre, Ontario.
- John Walker b. 1832 first elected in 1874 as Liberal member for London, Ontario.
- David Wardrope Wallace b. 1850 first elected in 1903 as Liberal member for Russell, Ontario.
- John Wallace b. 1812 first elected in 1867 as Liberal member for Albert, New Brunswick.
- John Alexander Wallace b. 1881 first elected in 1921 as Progressive member for Norfolk, Ontario.
- Mike Wallace b. 1963 first elected in 2006 as Conservative member for Burlington, Ontario.
- Nathaniel Clarke Wallace b. 1844 first elected in 1878 as Conservative member for York West, Ontario.
- Robert Wallace b. 1820 first elected in 1871 as Conservative member for Vancouver Island, British Columbia.
- Thomas George Wallace b. 1879 first elected in 1908 as Conservative member for York Centre, Ontario.
- William Wallace b. 1820 first elected in 1872 as Conservative member for Norfolk South, Ontario.
- Aquila Walsh b. 1823 first elected in 1867 as Conservative member for Norfolk North, Ontario.
- Joseph Charles Walsh b. 1868 first elected in 1906 as Liberal member for St. Anne, Quebec.
- Robert Nelson Walsh b. 1864 first elected in 1904 as Conservative member for Huntingdon, Quebec.
- William Allen Walsh b. 1887 first elected in 1935 as Conservative member for Mount Royal, Quebec.

== Wap–Way ==
- Tom Wappel b. 1950 first elected in 1988 as Liberal member for Scarborough West, Ontario.
- Mark Warawa b. 1950 first elected in 2004 as Conservative member for Langley, British Columbia.
- Alexander Bannerman Warburton b. 1852 first elected in 1908 as Liberal member for Queen's, Prince Edward Island.
- Henry Alfred Ward b. 1849 first elected in 1885 as Conservative member for Durham East, Ontario.
- William John Ward b. 1882 first elected in 1921 as Progressive member for Dauphin, Manitoba.
- Chris Warkentin b. 1978 first elected in 2006 as Conservative member for Peace River, Alberta
- Daniel Webster Warner b. 1857 first elected in 1921 as Progressive member for Strathcona, Alberta.
- Norman Melvin Warner b. 1943 first elected in 1984 as Progressive Conservative member for Stormont—Dundas, Ontario.
- David Warnock b. 1865 first elected in 1911 as Liberal member for Macleod, Alberta.
- Ralph Melville Warren b. 1882 first elected in 1937 as Liberal member for Renfrew North, Ontario.
- Judy Wasylycia-Leis b. 1951 first elected in 1997 as New Democratic Party member for Winnipeg North Centre, Manitoba.
- Tim Watchorn first elected in 2025 as Liberal member for Les Pays-d'en-Haut, Quebec.
- Ian Watson b. 1934 first elected in 1963 as Liberal member for Châteauguay—Huntingdon—Laprairie, Quebec.
- Jeff Watson b. 1971 first elected in 2004 as Conservative member for Essex, Ontario.
- Lawrence E. Watson b. 1917 first elected in 1963 as Progressive Conservative member for Assiniboia, Saskatchewan.
- Robert Watson b. 1853 first elected in 1882 as Liberal member for Marquette, Manitoba.
- Robert James Watson b. 1846 first elected in 1904 as Liberal member for Parry Sound, Ontario.
- Dianne Watts b. 1959 first elected in 2015 as Conservative member for South Surrey—White Rock, British Columbia.
- Kevin Waugh b. 1955 first elected in 2015 as Conservative member for Saskatoon—Grasswood, Saskatchewan.
- Elsie Eleanore Wayne b. 1932 first elected in 1993 as Progressive Conservative member for Saint John, New Brunswick.

== We ==
- David Bennington Weatherhead b. 1928 first elected in 1968 as Liberal member for Scarborough West, Ontario.
- George Dyer Weaver b. 1908 first elected in 1949 as Liberal member for Churchill, Manitoba.
- George Robert Webb b. 1886 first elected in 1945 as Progressive Conservative member for Leeds, Ontario.
- Roderick Arthur Ennis Webb b. 1910 first elected in 1959 as Progressive Conservative member for Hastings—Frontenac, Ontario.
- William Hoste Webb b. 1824 first elected in 1867 as Conservative member for Richmond—Wolfe, Quebec.
- Len Webber b. 1960 first elected in 2015 as Conservative member for Calgary Confederation, Alberta.
- Allan Ross Webster b. 1903 first elected in 1958 as Progressive Conservative member for Saint-Antoine—Westmount, Quebec.
- Arnold Alexander Webster b. 1899 first elected in 1962 as New Democratic Party member for Vancouver Kingsway, British Columbia.
- John Webster b. 1856 first elected in 1911 as Conservative member for Brockville, Ontario.
- John Aaron Weese b. 1891 first elected in 1930 as Conservative member for Prince Edward—Lennox, Ontario.
- Oscar William Weichel b. 1894 first elected in 1958 as Progressive Conservative member for Waterloo North, Ontario.
- William George Weichel b. 1870 first elected in 1911 as Conservative member for Waterloo North, Ontario.
- Patrick Weiler b. 1986 first elected in 2019 as Liberal member for West Vancouver—Sunshine Coast—Sea to Sky Country, British Columbia.
- Gérard Weiner b. 1933 first elected in 1984 as Progressive Conservative member for Dollard, Quebec.
- Erin Weir b. 1982 first elected in 2015 as New Democratic Party member for Regina—Lewvan, Saskatchewan.
- Robert Weir b. 1882 first elected in 1930 as Conservative member for Melfort, Saskatchewan.
- William Gilbert Weir b. 1896 first elected in 1930 as Liberal-Progressive member for Macdonald, Manitoba.
- John William Welbourn b. 1900 first elected in 1949 as Liberal member for Jasper—Edson, Alberta.
- Charles Wesley Weldon b. 1830 first elected in 1878 as Liberal member for City and County of St. John, New Brunswick.
- Richard Chapman Weldon b. 1849 first elected in 1887 as Conservative member for Albert, New Brunswick.
- Derek Wells b. 1946 first elected in 1993 as Liberal member for South Shore, Nova Scotia.
- James Pearson Wells b. 1822 first elected in 1867 as Liberal member for York North, Ontario.
- Rupert Mearse Wells b. 1835 first elected in 1882 as Liberal member for Bruce East, Ontario.
- William Welsh b. 1822 first elected in 1887 as Independent Liberal member for Queen's County, Prince Edward Island.
- Robert Wenman b. 1940 first elected in 1974 as Progressive Conservative member for Fraser Valley West, British Columbia.
- Jules Wermenlinger b. 1888 first elected in 1935 as Conservative member for Verdun, Quebec.
- Anton Weselak b. 1918 first elected in 1953 as Liberal member for Springfield, Manitoba.
- John Weston b. 1958 first elected in 2008 as Conservative member for West Vancouver—Sunshine Coast—Sea to Sky Country, British Columbia.
- Rodney Weston b. 1964 first elected in 2008 as Conservative member for Saint John, New Brunswick.

== Wh ==
- Nick Whalen b. 1973 first elected in 2015 as Liberal member for St. John's East, Newfoundland and Labrador.
- Eugene Whelan b. 1924 first elected in 1962 as Liberal member for Essex South, Ontario.
- Susan Whelan b. 1963 first elected in 1993 as Liberal member for Essex—Windsor, Ontario.
- George Wheler b. 1836 first elected in 1878 as Liberal member for Ontario North, Ontario.
- Ross Whicher b. 1918 first elected in 1968 as Liberal member for Bruce, Ontario.
- Howard Primrose Whidden b. 1871 first elected in 1917 as Unionist member for Brandon, Manitoba.
- Arthur Walter Adams White b. 1907 first elected in 1953 as Liberal member for Waterloo South, Ontario.
- Brian White b. 1951 first elected in 1984 as Progressive Conservative member for Dauphin—Swan River, Manitoba.
- George Stanley White b. 1897 first elected in 1940 as National Government member for Hastings—Peterborough, Ontario.
- Gerald Verner White b. 1879 first elected in 1906 as Conservative member for Renfrew North, Ontario.
- Harry Oliver White b. 1895 first elected in 1945 as Progressive Conservative member for Middlesex East, Ontario.
- John White b. 1833 first elected in 1871 as Conservative member for Hastings East, Ontario.
- John White b. 1811 first elected in 1867 as Liberal member for Halton, Ontario.
- John Franklin White b. 1863 first elected in 1921 as Conservative member for London, Ontario.
- Nathaniel Whitworth White b. 1837 first elected in 1891 as Liberal-Conservative member for Shelburne, Nova Scotia.
- Peter White b. 1838 first elected in 1874 as Conservative member for Renfrew North, Ontario.
- Randy White b. 1948 first elected in 1993 as Reform member for Fraser Valley West, British Columbia.
- Robert Smeaton White b. 1856 first elected in 1888 as Conservative member for Cardwell, Ontario.
- Ted White b. 1949 first elected in 1993 as Reform member for North Vancouver, British Columbia.
- Thomas White b. 1830 first elected in 1878 as Conservative member for Cardwell, Ontario.
- William Henry White b. 1865 first elected in 1908 as Liberal member for Victoria, Alberta.
- William Thomas White b. 1866 first elected in 1911 as Conservative member for Leeds, Ontario.
- Joseph Whitehead b. 1814 first elected in 1867 as Liberal member for Huron North, Ontario.
- Harry B. Whiteside b. 1909 first elected in 1949 as Liberal member for Swift Current, Saskatchewan.
- Dean Waldon Whiteway b. 1944 first elected in 1974 as Progressive Conservative member for Selkirk, Manitoba.
- Rutherford Lester Whiting b. 1930 first elected in 1968 as Liberal member for Halton, Ontario.
- Frederick Primrose Whitman b. 1896 first elected in 1940 as Liberal member for Mount Royal, Quebec.
- George H. Whittaker b. 1919 first elected in 1972 as Progressive Conservative member for Okanagan Boundary, British Columbia.
- John R. Whittaker b. 1944 first elected in 1988 as New Democratic Party member for Okanagan—Similkameen—Merritt, British Columbia.

== Wig–Wil ==
- William Hannum Wightman b. 1929 first elected in 1979 as Progressive Conservative member for Scarborough West, Ontario.
- Lewis Wigle b. 1845 first elected in 1882 as Conservative member for Essex South, Ontario.
- Rupert Wilson Wigmore b. 1873 first elected in 1917 as Unionist member for St. John—Albert, New Brunswick.
- Godfrey Stanley Wilbee b. 1932 first elected in 1988 as Progressive Conservative member for Delta, British Columbia.
- Oliver James Wilcox b. 1869 first elected in 1909 as Conservative member for Essex North, Ontario.
- Bryon Wilfert b. 1952 first elected in 1997 as Liberal member for Oak Ridges, Ontario.
- Robert Wilkes b. 1832 first elected in 1872 as Liberal member for Toronto Centre, Ontario.
- Jonathan Wilkinson b. 1965 first elected in 2015 as Liberal member for North Vancouver, British Columbia.
- David Wilks b. 1959 first elected in 2011 as Conservative member for Kootenay—Columbia, British Columbia.
- Arthur Henry Williams b. 1894 first elected in 1948 as Cooperative Commonwealth Federation member for Ontario, Ontario.
- Arthur Trefusis Heneage Williams b. 1837 first elected in 1878 as Conservative member for Durham East, Ontario.
- John G. Williams b. 1946 first elected in 1993 as Reform member for St. Albert, Alberta.
- John Williamson b. 1970 first elected in 2011 as Conservative member for New Brunswick Southwest, New Brunswick.
- Ryan Williams b. 1979 first elected in 2021 as Conservative member for Bay of Quinte, Ontario.
- Errick French Willis b. 1896 first elected in 1930 as Progressive Conservative member for Souris, Manitoba.
- Charles James McNeil Willoughby b. 1894 first elected in 1963 as Progressive Conservative member for Kamloops, British Columbia.
- Crowell Willson b. 1815 first elected in 1867 as Liberal-Conservative member for Middlesex East, Ontario.
- Robert Duncan Wilmot b. 1837 first elected in 1887 as Conservative member for Sunbury, New Brunswick.
- Blair Wilson b. 1963 first elected in 2006 as Liberal member for West Vancouver—Sunshine Coast—Sea to Sky Country, British Columbia.
- Charles Avila Wilson b. 1869 first elected in 1908 as Liberal member for Laval, Quebec.
- Geoff Wilson b. 1941 first elected in 1984 as Progressive Conservative member for Swift Current—Maple Creek, Saskatchewan.
- Gordon Crooks Wilson b. 1872 first elected in 1911 as Conservative member for Wentworth, Ontario.
- James Crocket Wilson b. 1841 first elected in 1887 as Liberal-Conservative member for Argenteuil, Quebec.
- James Robert Wilson b. 1866 first elected in 1917 as Unionist member for Saskatoon, Saskatchewan.
- John Henry Wilson b. 1834 first elected in 1882 as Liberal member for Elgin East, Ontario.
- Lawrence Alexander Wilson b. 1863 first elected in 1925 as Liberal member for Vaudreuil—Soulanges, Quebec.
- Michael Holcombe Wilson b. 1937 first elected in 1979 as Progressive Conservative member for Etobicoke Centre, Ontario.
- Norman Frank Wilson b. 1876 first elected in 1904 as Liberal member for Russell, Ontario.
- Uriah Wilson b. 1841 first elected in 1887 as Conservative member for Lennox, Ontario.
- Jody Wilson-Raybould b. 1971 first elected in 2015 as Liberal member for Vancouver Granville, British Columbia.
- Herbert Earl Wilton b. 1869 first elected in 1935 as Conservative member for Hamilton West, Ontario.

== Win–Wit ==
- Harold Edward Winch b. 1907 first elected in 1953 as Cooperative Commonwealth Federation member for Vancouver East, British Columbia.
- William C. Winegard b. 1924 first elected in 1984 as Progressive Conservative member for Guelph, Ontario.
- Eric Alfred Winkler b. 1920 first elected in 1957 as Progressive Conservative member for Grey—Bruce, Ontario.
- Howard Winkler b. 1891 first elected in 1935 as Liberal member for Lisgar, Manitoba.
- Robert Henry Winters b. 1910 first elected in 1945 as Liberal member for Queens—Lunenburg, Nova Scotia.
- John Wise b. 1935 first elected in 1972 as Progressive Conservative member for Elgin, Ontario.
- John Philip Wiser b. 1825 first elected in 1878 as Liberal member for Grenville South, Ontario.
- Andrew Witer b. 1946 first elected in 1984 as Progressive Conservative member for Parkdale—High Park, Ontario.
- Henry Buckingham Witton b. 1831 first elected in 1872 as Conservative member for Hamilton, Ontario.

== Wo ==
- Alice Wong b. 1948 first elected in 2008 as Conservative member for Richmond, British Columbia.
- Andrew Trew Wood b. 1826 first elected in 1874 as Liberal member for Hamilton, Ontario.
- Bob Wood b. 1940 first elected in 1988 as Liberal member for Nipissing, Ontario.
- Donald Paul Wood b. 1933 first elected in 1977 as Liberal member for Malpeque, Prince Edward Island.
- Edmund Burke Wood b. 1820 first elected in 1867 as Liberal member for Brant South, Ontario.
- George Ernest Wood b. 1888 first elected in 1935 as Liberal member for Brant, Ontario.
- John Fisher Wood b. 1852 first elected in 1882 as Liberal-Conservative member for Brockville, Ontario.
- Josiah Wood b. 1843 first elected in 1882 as Conservative member for Westmorland, New Brunswick.
- Robert James Wood b. 1886 first elected in 1949 as Liberal member for Norquay, Manitoba.
- Robert John Woods b. 1859 first elected in 1921 as Progressive member for Dufferin, Ontario.
- James Shaver Woodsworth b. 1874 first elected in 1921 as Labour member for Winnipeg Centre, Manitoba.
- Douglas Benjamin Woodworth b. 1841 first elected in 1882 as Liberal-Conservative member for Kings, Nova Scotia.
- Stephen Woodworth b. 1954 first elected in 2008 as Conservative member for Kitchener Centre, Ontario.
- Eldon Woolliams b. 1916 first elected in 1958 as Progressive Conservative member for Bow River, Alberta.
- Thomas Workman b. 1813 first elected in 1867 as Liberal member for Montreal Centre, Quebec.
- Arthur Norreys Worthington b. 1862 first elected in 1904 as Conservative member for Town of Sherbrooke, Quebec.
- Dave Worthy b. 1934 first elected in 1988 as Progressive Conservative member for Cariboo—Chilcotin, British Columbia.

== Wr ==
- Jack Wratten b. 1906 first elected in 1957 as Progressive Conservative member for Brantford, Ontario.
- Aaron Abel Wright b. 1840 first elected in 1900 as Liberal member for Renfrew South, Ontario.
- Alonzo Wright b. 1825 first elected in 1867 as Liberal-Conservative member for County of Ottawa, Quebec.
- Amos Wright b. 1809 first elected in 1868 as Liberal member for York West, Ontario.
- David McKenzie Wright b. 1874 first elected in 1925 as Conservative member for Perth North, Ontario.
- Frederick Wright b. 1933 first elected in 1980 as Progressive Conservative member for Calgary North, Alberta.
- Henry Oswald Wright b. 1880 first elected in 1917 as Unionist member for Battleford, Saskatchewan.
- Percy Ellis Wright b. 1892 first elected in 1940 as Cooperative Commonwealth Federation member for Melfort, Saskatchewan.
- William Wright b. 1853 first elected in 1904 as Conservative member for Muskoka, Ontario.
- William McKay Wright b. 1840 first elected in 1872 as Liberal-Conservative member for Pontiac, Quebec.
- Borys Wrzesnewskyj b. 1960 first elected in 2004 as Liberal member for Etobicoke Centre, Ontario.

== Wy ==
- William Duncan Wylie b. 1900 first elected in 1945 as Social Credit member for Medicine Hat, Alberta.
