= List of members of the Canadian House of Commons (B) =

== Bab–Bal ==
- Louis François Georges Baby b. 1834 first elected in 1872 as Conservative member for Joliette, Quebec.
- André Bachand b. 1934 first elected in 1980 as Liberal member for Missisquoi, Quebec.
- André Bachand b. 1961 first elected in 1997 as Progressive Conservative member for Richmond—Arthabaska, Quebec.
- Claude Bachand b. 1951 first elected in 1993 as Bloc Québécois member for Saint-Jean, Quebec.
- Taylor Bachrach b. 1978 first elected in 2019 as New Democratic Party member for Skeena—Bulkley Valley, British Columbia.
- Hubert Badanai b. 1895 first elected in 1958 as Liberal member for Fort William, Ontario.
- Vance Badawey b. 1964 first elected in 2015 as Liberal member for Niagara Centre, Ontario.
- Larry Bagnell b. 1949 first elected in 2000 as Liberal member for Yukon, Yukon.
- Burton Bailey first elected in 2025 as Conservative member for Red Deer, Alberta.
- Roy Bailey b. 1928 first elected in 1997 as Reform member for Souris—Moose Mountain, Saskatchewan.
- James William Bain b. 1838 first elected in 1883 as Conservative member for Soulanges, Quebec.
- Thomas Bain b. 1834 first elected in 1872 as Liberal member for Wentworth North, Ontario.
- Navdeep Singh Bains b. 1977 first elected in 2004 as Liberal member for Mississauga—Brampton South, Ontario.
- Parm Bains first elected in 2021 as Liberal member for Steveston—Richmond East, British Columbia.
- George Frederick Baird b. 1851 first elected in 1887 as Conservative member for Queen's, New Brunswick.
- John Baird b. 1969 first elected in 2006 as Conservative member for Ottawa West—Nepean
- Edgar Crow Baker b. 1845 first elected in 1882 as Conservative member for Victoria, British Columbia.
- George Barnard Baker b. 1834 first elected in 1870 as Liberal-Conservative member for Missisquoi, Quebec.
- George Harold Baker b. 1877 first elected in 1911 as Conservative member for Brome, Quebec.
- George Baker b. 1942 first elected in 1974 as Liberal member for Gander—Twillingate, Newfoundland and Labrador.
- Loran Ellis Baker b. 1905 first elected in 1945 as Liberal member for Shelburne—Yarmouth—Clare, Nova Scotia.
- Richard Langton Baker b. 1870 first elected in 1925 as Conservative member for Toronto Northeast, Ontario.
- Walter Baker b. 1930 first elected in 1972 as Progressive Conservative member for Grenville—Carleton, Ontario.
- Yvan Baker b. 1977 first elected in 2019 as Liberal member for Etobicoke Centre, Ontario.
- Eleni Bakopanos b. 1954 first elected in 1993 as Liberal member for Saint-Denis, Quebec.
- Léon Balcer b. 1917 first elected in 1949 as Progressive Conservative member for Trois-Rivières, Quebec.
- Samuel Rosborough Balcom b. 1888 first elected in 1950 as Liberal member for Halifax, Nova Scotia.
- Tony Baldinelli b. 1964 first elected in 2019 as Conservative member for Niagara Falls, Ontario.
- Ged Baldwin b. 1907 first elected in 1958 as Progressive Conservative member for Peace River, Alberta.
- Willis Keith Baldwin b. 1857 first elected in 1917 as Laurier Liberal member for Stanstead, Quebec.
- James Balfour b. 1928 first elected in 1972 as Progressive Conservative member for Regina East, Saskatchewan.
- Georges Ball b. 1838 first elected in 1900 as Conservative member for Nicolet, Quebec.
- Robert James Ball b. 1857 first elected in 1911 as Conservative member for Grey South, Ontario.
- Charles Ballantyne b. 1867 first elected in 1917 as Unionist member for St. Lawrence—St. George, Quebec.
- Harold Raymond Ballard b. 1918 first elected in 1965 as Progressive Conservative member for Calgary South, Alberta.

== Ban–Bar ==
- Leland Payson Bancroft b. 1880 first elected in 1921 as Progressive member for Selkirk, Manitoba.
- Andrew Graham Ballenden Bannatyne b. 1829 first elected in 1875 as Liberal member for Provencher, Manitoba.
- William Bannerman b. 1841 first elected in 1878 as Conservative member for Renfrew South, Ontario.
- Harry James Barber b. 1875 first elected in 1925 as Conservative member for Fraser Valley, British Columbia.
- Charles-Noël Barbès b. 1914 first elected in 1957 as Liberal member for Chapleau, Quebec.
- Vivian Barbot b. 1941 first elected in 2006 as Bloc Québécois member for Papineau, Quebec.
- Karim Bardeesy first elected in 2025 as Liberal member for Taiaiko'n—Parkdale—High Park, Ontario.
- Jean Louis Baribeau b. 1893 first elected in 1930 as Conservative member for Champlain, Quebec.
- Frederick Eustace Barker b. 1838 first elected in 1885 as Conservative member for City of St. John, New Brunswick.
- Samuel Barker b. 1839 first elected in 1900 as Conservative member for Hamilton, Ontario.
- John Barlow b. 1971 first elected in 2014 as Conservative member for Macleod, Alberta.
- Francis Jones Barnard b. 1829 first elected in 1879 as Conservative member for Yale, British Columbia.
- Frank Stillman Barnard b. 1856 first elected in 1888 as Conservative member for Cariboo, British Columbia.
- George Henry Barnard b. 1868 first elected in 1908 as Conservative member for Victoria City, British Columbia.
- Rex Barnes b. 1959 first elected in 2002 as Progressive Conservative member for Gander—Grand Falls, Newfoundland and Labrador.
- Sue Barnes b. 1952 first elected in 1993 as Liberal member for London West, Ontario.
- Thomas Speakman Barnett b. 1909 first elected in 1953 as Co-operative Commonwealth Federation member for Comox—Alberni, British Columbia.
- John Barr b. 1843 first elected in 1904 as Conservative member for Dufferin, Ontario.
- Dave Barrett b. 1930 first elected in 1988 as New Democratic Party member for Esquimalt—Juan de Fuca, British Columbia.
- H. Gordon Barrett b. 1915 first elected in 1968 as Liberal member for Lincoln, Ontario.
- Michael Barrett b. 1984 first elected in 2018 as Conservative member for Leeds—Grenville—Thousand Islands and Rideau Lakes, Ontario.
- Theobald Butler Barrett b. 1894 first elected in 1945 as Progressive Conservative member for Norfolk, Ontario.
- Gilbert Barrette b. 1941 first elected in 2003 as Liberal member for Témiscamingue, Quebec.
- Joseph Arthur Barrette b. 1875 first elected in 1911 as Conservative member for Berthier, Quebec.
- Merrill Edwin Barrington b. 1920 first elected in 1958 as Progressive Conservative member for Châteauguay—Huntingdon—Laprairie, Quebec.
- John Augustus Barron b. 1850 first elected in 1887 as Liberal member for Victoria North, Ontario.
- Lisa Marie Barron first elected in 2021 as New Democratic Party member for Nanaimo—Ladysmith, British Columbia.
- John Patrick Barry b. 1893 first elected in 1935 as Liberal member for Northumberland, New Brunswick.
- Xavier Barsalou-Duval b. 1988 first elected in 2015 as Bloc Québécois member for Pierre-Boucher—Les Patriotes—Verchères, Quebec.
- Georges Isidore Barthe b. 1834 first elected in 1870 as Independent Conservative member for Richelieu, Quebec.

== Bas–Baz ==
- Ron Basford b. 1932 first elected in 1963 as Liberal member for Vancouver—Burrard, British Columbia.
- James William Baskin b. 1920 first elected in 1957 as Progressive Conservative member for Renfrew South, Ontario.
- Joyce Bateman b. 1957 first elected in 2011 as Conservative member for Winnipeg South Centre, Manitoba.
- Arthur James Bater b. 1889 first elected in 1949 as Liberal member for The Battlefords, Saskatchewan.
- Herman Maxwell Batten b. 1909 first elected in 1953 as Liberal member for Humber—St. George's, Newfoundland and Labrador.
- Dave Batters b. 1969 first elected in 2004 as Conservative member for Palliser, Saskatchewan.
- Jaime Battiste b. 1979 first elected in 2019 as Liberal member for Sydney—Victoria, Nova Scotia.
- Peter Colwell Bawden b. 1929 first elected in 1972 as Progressive Conservative member for Calgary South, Alberta.
- John Babington Macaulay Baxter b. 1868 first elected in 1921 as Conservative member for St. John—Albert, New Brunswick.
- Frank Baylis b. 1962 first elected in 2015 as Liberal member for Pierrefonds—Dollard, Quebec.
- Charles Bazinet b. 1845 first elected in 1896 as Liberal member for Joliette, Quebec.

== Bea–Bei ==
- Duncan Beattie b. 1929 first elected in 1972 as Progressive Conservative member for Hamilton Mountain, Ontario.
- Robert Ethelbert Beattie b. 1875 first elected in 1921 as Liberal member for Kootenay East, British Columbia.
- Thomas Beattie b. 1844 first elected in 1896 as Conservative member for London, Ontario.
- Perrin Beatty b. 1950 first elected in 1972 as Progressive Conservative member for Wellington—Grey—Dufferin—Waterloo, Ontario.
- James Beaty b. 1798 first elected in 1867 as Conservative member for Toronto East, Ontario.
- James Beaty b. 1831 first elected in 1880 as Conservative member for West Toronto, Ontario.
- Arthur-Lucien Beaubien b. 1879 first elected in 1921 as Liberal member for Provencher, Manitoba.
- Joseph-Octave Beaubien b. 1825 first elected in 1867 as Conservative member for Montmagny, Quebec.
- Louis Beaubien b. 1837 first elected in 1872 as Conservative member for Hochelaga, Quebec.
- David Wilson Beaubier b. 1864 first elected in 1930 as Conservative member for Brandon, Manitoba.
- Suzanne Beauchamp-Niquet b. 1932 first elected in 1980 as Liberal member for Roberval, Quebec.
- Pierre-Clovis Beauchesne b. 1841 first elected in 1879 as Conservative member for Bonaventure, Quebec.
- Josée Beaudin b. 1961 first elected in 2008 as Bloc Québécois member for Saint-Lambert, Quebec.
- Léonel Beaudoin b. 1924 first elected in 1968 as Ralliement Créditiste member for Richmond, Quebec.
- Louis-René Beaudoin b. 1912 first elected in 1945 as Liberal member for Vaudreuil—Soulanges, Quebec.
- Roland Beaudry b. 1906 first elected in 1945 as Liberal member for St. James, Quebec.
- Jean Robert Beaulé b. 1927 first elected in 1962 as Social Credit member for Quebec East, Quebec.
- Jean-Paul Beaulieu b. 1902 first elected in 1965 as Progressive Conservative member for Saint-Jean—Iberville—Napierville, Quebec.
- Mario Beaulieu b. 1959 first elected in 1959 as Bloc Québécois member for La Pointe-de-l'Île, Quebec.
- Colleen Beaumier b. 1944 first elected in 1993 as Liberal member for Brampton, Ontario.
- Aimé Majorique Beauparlant b. 1864 first elected in 1904 as Liberal member for St. Hyacinthe, Quebec.
- Cléophas Beausoleil b. 1845 first elected in 1887 as Liberal member for Berthier, Quebec.
- Albert Béchard b. 1922 first elected in 1962 as Liberal member for Bonaventure, Quebec.
- François Béchard b. 1830 first elected in 1867 as Liberal member for Iberville, Quebec.
- William George Beech b. 1898 first elected in 1957 as Progressive Conservative member for York South, Ontario.
- Terry Beech b. 1981 first elected in 2015 as Liberal member for Burnaby North—Seymour, British Columbia.
- Bruce Silas Beer b. 1910 first elected in 1962 as Liberal member for Peel, Ontario.
- Monique Bégin b. 1936 first elected in 1972 as Liberal member for Saint-Michel, Quebec.
- René Bégin b. 1912 first elected in 1957 as Liberal member for Quebec West, Quebec.
- Doly Begum first elected in 2026 as Liberal member for Scarborough Southwest, Ontario.
- Robert Beith b. 1843 first elected in 1891 as Liberal member for Durham West, Ontario.

== Bel ==
- Réginald Bélair b. 1949 first elected in 1988 as Liberal member for Cochrane—Superior, Ontario.
- Henri Sévérin Béland b. 1869 first elected in 1902 as Liberal member for Beauce, Quebec.
- Buckley Belanger b. 1960 first elected in 2025 as Liberal member for Desnethé—Missinippi—Churchill River, Saskatchewan.
- Jim Belanger first elected in 2025 as Conservative member for Sudbury East—Manitoulin—Nickel Belt, Ontario.
- Louis-Philippe-Antoine Bélanger b. 1907 first elected in 1962 as Social Credit member for Charlevoix, Quebec.
- Mauril Bélanger b. 1955 first elected in 1995 as Liberal member for Ottawa—Vanier, Ontario.
- Napoléon Belcourt b. 1860 first elected in 1896 as Liberal member for City of Ottawa, Ontario.
- Charles Bélec b. 1872 first elected in 1930 as Conservative member for Pontiac, Quebec.
- Richard Bélisle b. 1946 first elected in 1993 as Bloc Québécois member for La Prairie, Quebec.
- Adam Carr Bell b. 1847 first elected in 1896 as Conservative member for Pictou, Nova Scotia.
- Catherine J. Bell b. 1954 first elected in 2006 as New Democratic Party member for Vancouver Island North, British Columbia
- Charles William Bell b. 1876 first elected in 1925 as Conservative member for Hamilton West, Ontario.
- Don Bell b. 1942 first elected in 2004 as Liberal member for North Vancouver, British Columbia.
- John Howatt Bell b. 1845 first elected in 1898 as Liberal member for East Prince, Prince Edward Island.
- John William Bell b. 1838 first elected in 1882 as Conservative member for Addington, Ontario.
- Leslie Gordon Bell b. 1889 first elected in 1925 as Conservative member for St. Antoine, Quebec.
- Dick Bell b. 1913 first elected in 1957 as Progressive Conservative member for Carleton, Ontario.
- Thomas Bell b. 1863 first elected in 1925 as Conservative member for St. John—Albert, New Brunswick.
- Thomas Miller Bell b. 1923 first elected in 1953 as Progressive Conservative member for St. John—Albert, New Brunswick.
- André Bellavance b. 1964 first elected in 2004 as Bloc Québécois member for Richmond—Arthabaska, Quebec.
- Isidore-Noël Belleau b. 1848 first elected in 1883 as Conservative member for Lévis, Quebec.
- Michel Bellehumeur b. 1963 first elected in 1993 as Bloc Québécois member for Berthier—Montcalm, Quebec.
- Adélard Bellemare b. 1871 first elected in 1911 as Independent Conservative member for Maskinongé, Quebec.
- Eugène Bellemare b. 1932 first elected in 1988 as Liberal member for Carleton—Gloucester, Ontario.
- Joseph Hyacinthe Bellerose b. 1820 first elected in 1867 as Conservative member for Laval, Quebec.
- Louis de Gonzague Belley b. 1863 first elected in 1892 as Conservative member for Chicoutimi—Saguenay, Quebec.
- Ross Belsher b. 1933 first elected in 1984 as Progressive Conservative member for Fraser Valley East, British Columbia.
- Alfred Belzile b. 1907 first elected in 1958 as Progressive Conservative member for Matapédia—Matane, Quebec.
- Gleason Belzile b. 1898 first elected in 1945 as Liberal member for Rimouski, Quebec.

== Ben ==
- Alfred Henry Bence b. 1908 first elected in 1940 as Progressive Conservative member for Saskatoon City, Saskatchewan.
- Rachel Bendayan b. 1980 first elected in 2019 as Liberal member for Outremont, Quebec.
- William Moore Benidickson b. 1911 first elected in 1945 as Liberal member for Kenora—Rainy River, Ontario.
- Les Benjamin b. 1925 first elected in 1968 as New Democratic Party member for Regina—Lake Centre, Saskatchewan.
- Carolyn Bennett b. 1950 first elected in 1997 as Liberal member for St. Paul's, Ontario.
- Colin Emerson Bennett b. 1908 first elected in 1949 as Liberal member for Grey North, Ontario.
- Richard Bedford Bennett b. 1870 first elected in 1911 as Conservative member for Calgary, Alberta.
- Sybil Bennett b. 1904 first elected in 1953 as Progressive Conservative member for Halton, Ontario.
- William Humphrey Bennett b. 1859 first elected in 1892 as Conservative member for Simcoe East, Ontario.
- Aldéric-Joseph Benoit b. 1877 first elected in 1922 as Liberal member for St. Johns—Iberville, Quebec.
- Leon Benoit b. 1950 first elected in 1993 as Reform member for Vegreville, Alberta.
- Pierre Basile Benoit b. 1837 first elected in 1867 as Conservative member for Chambly, Quebec.
- Tyrone Benskin b. 1958 first elected in 2011 as New Democratic Party member for Jeanne-Le Ber, Quebec.
- Edgar Benson b. 1923 first elected in 1962 as Liberal member for Kingston, Ontario.
- James Rea Benson b. 1807 first elected in 1867 as Liberal-Conservative member for Lincoln, Ontario.
- Sheri Benson first elected in 2015 as New Democratic Party member for Saskatoon West, Saskatchewan.
- William Thomas Benson b. 1858 first elected in 1882 as Conservative member for Grenville South, Ontario.
- Thomas John Bentley b. 1891 first elected in 1945 as Co-operative Commonwealth Federation member for Swift Current, Saskatchewan.
- Bob Benzen b. 1959 first elected in 2017 as Conservative member for Calgary Heritage, Alberta.

== Ber ==
- Peter Bercovitch b. 1879 first elected in 1938 as Liberal member for Cartier, Quebec.
- Candice Bergen b. 1964 first elected in 2008 as Conservative member for Portage—Lisgar, Manitoba.
- David Berger b. 1950 first elected in 1979 as Liberal member for Laurier, Quebec.
- Jean-Charles Richard Berger b. 1924 first elected in 1963 as Liberal member for Montmagny—l'Islet, Quebec.
- Thomas Berger b. 1933 first elected in 1962 as New Democratic Party member for Vancouver—Burrard, British Columbia.
- Joseph Gédéon Horace Bergeron b. 1854 first elected in 1879 as Conservative member for Beauharnois, Quebec.
- Stéphane Bergeron b. 1965 first elected in 1993 as Bloc Québécois member for Verchères, Quebec.
- Darby Bergin b. 1826 first elected in 1872 as Liberal-Conservative member for Cornwall, Ontario.
- André Bernier b. 1930 first elected in 1962 as Social Credit member for Richmond—Wolfe, Quebec.
- Gilles Bernier b. 1934 first elected in 1984 as Progressive Conservative member for Beauce, Quebec.
- Gilles Bernier b. 1955 first elected in 1997 as Progressive Conservative member for Tobique—Mactaquac, New Brunswick.
- Henri Bernier b. 1821 first elected in 1874 as Liberal member for Lotbinière, Quebec.
- Maurice Bernier b. 1947 first elected in 1993 as Bloc Québécois member for Mégantic—Compton—Stanstead, Quebec.
- Maxime Bernier b. 1963 first elected in 2006 as Conservative member for Beauce, Quebec
- Michel Esdras Bernier b. 1841 first elected in 1882 as Liberal member for St. Hyacinthe, Quebec.
- Yvan Bernier b. 1960 first elected in 1993 as Bloc Québécois member for Gaspé, Quebec.
- Luc Berthold first elected in 2015 as Conservative member for Mégantic—L'Érable, Quebec.
- George Hope Bertram b. 1847 first elected in 1897 as Liberal member for Toronto Centre, Ontario.
- John Bertram b. 1837 first elected in 1872 as Liberal member for Peterborough West, Ontario.
- Charles Bertrand b. 1824 first elected in 1867 as Conservative member for Témiscouata, Quebec.
- Elie-Oscar Bertrand b. 1894 first elected in 1929 as Liberal member for Prescott, Ontario.
- Ernest Bertrand b. 1888 first elected in 1935 as Liberal member for Laurier, Quebec.
- Gabrielle Bertrand b. 1923 first elected in 1984 as Progressive Conservative member for Brome—Missisquoi, Quebec.
- Lionel Bertrand b. 1906 first elected in 1940 as Independent Liberal member for Terrebonne, Quebec.
- Robert Bertrand b. 1953 first elected in 1993 as Liberal member for Pontiac—Gatineau—Labelle, Quebec.
- Sylvie Bérubé first elected in 2019 as Bloc Québécois member for Abitibi—Baie-James—Nunavik—Eeyou, Quebec.

== Bes–Bez ==
- Lyne Bessette b. 1975 first elected in 2019 as Liberal member for Brome—Missisquoi, Quebec.
- Charles Alexander Best b. 1931 first elected in 1957 as Progressive Conservative member for Halton, Ontario.
- John Best b. 1861 first elected in 1909 as Conservative member for Dufferin, Ontario.
- Judy Bethel b. 1943 first elected in 1993 as Liberal member for Edmonton East, Alberta.
- John Lemuel Bethune b. 1850 first elected in 1896 as Conservative member for Victoria, Nova Scotia.
- Arthur Bettez b. 1871 first elected in 1925 as Liberal member for Three Rivers—St. Maurice, Quebec.
- Frederick Cronyn Betts b. 1896 first elected in 1935 as Conservative member for London, Ontario.
- Maurizio Bevilacqua b. 1960 first elected in 1988 as Liberal member for York North, Ontario.
- Dennis Bevington b. 1953 first elected in 2006 as New Democratic Party member for Western Arctic, Northwest Territories
- David Bexte first elected in 2025 as Conservative member for Bow River, Alberta.
- Hilliard Beyerstein b. 1907 first elected in 1949 as Social Credit member for Camrose, Alberta.
- William Addison Beynon b. 1877 first elected in 1930 as Conservative member for Moose Jaw, Saskatchewan.
- James Bezan b. 1965 first elected in 2004 as Conservative member for Selkirk—Interlake, Manitoba.

== Bh ==
- Jag Bhaduria b. 1940 first elected in 1993 as Liberal member for Markham—Whitchurch—Stouffville, Ontario.

== Bi ==
- Marie-Claude Bibeau b. 1970 first elected in 2015 as Liberal member for Compton—Stanstead member for Quebec.
- Robert Bickerdike b. 1843 first elected in 1900 as Liberal member for St. Lawrence, Quebec.
- Jack Bigg b. 1912 first elected in 1958 as Progressive Conservative member for Athabaska, Alberta.
- James Lyons Biggar b. 1824 first elected in 1874 as Independent Liberal member for Northumberland East, Ontario.
- Bernard Bigras b. 1969 first elected in 1997 as Bloc Québécois member for Rosemont, Quebec.
- Silas Tertius Rand Bill b. 1842 first elected in 1878 as Liberal-Conservative member for Queens, Nova Scotia.
- Louis Adolphe Billy b. 1834 first elected in 1882 as Conservative member for Rimouski, Quebec.
- Gérard Binet b. 1955 first elected in 2000 as Liberal member for Frontenac—Mégantic, Quebec.
- Joseph Binette b. 1861 first elected in 1921 as Progressive member for Prescott, Ontario.
- Kenneth C. Binks b. 1925 first elected in 1979 as Progressive Conservative member for Ottawa West, Ontario.
- Pat Binns b. 1948 first elected in 1984 as Progressive Conservative member for Cardigan, Prince Edward Island.
- Bud Bird b. 1932 first elected in 1988 as Progressive Conservative member for Fredericton, New Brunswick.
- Thomas William Bird b. 1883 first elected in 1921 as Progressive member for Nelson, Manitoba.
- Thomas Birkett b. 1844 first elected in 1900 as Conservative member for City of Ottawa, Ontario.
- Edgar Douglas Richmond Bissett b. 1890 first elected in 1926 as Liberal Progressive member for Springfield, Manitoba.
- André Bissonnette b. 1945 first elected in 1984 as Progressive Conservative member for Saint-Jean, Quebec.
- J.-Eugène Bissonnette b. 1892 first elected in 1958 as Progressive Conservative member for Quebec West, Quebec.
- Chris Bittle b. 1979 first elected in 2015 as Liberal member for St. Catharines, Ontario.
- David Bjornson b. 1947 first elected in 1988 as Progressive Conservative member for Selkirk—Red River, Manitoba.

== Blac–Blai ==
- Dawn Black b. 1943 first elected in 1988 as New Democratic Party member for New Westminster—Burnaby, British Columbia.
- Donald Elmer Black b. 1892 first elected in 1935 as Liberal member for Châteauguay—Huntingdon, Quebec.
- George Black b. 1873 first elected in 1921 as Conservative member for Yukon, Yukon.
- Judson Burpee Black b. 1842 first elected in 1904 as Liberal member for Hants, Nova Scotia.
- Martha Black b. 1866 first elected in 1935 as Independent Conservative member for Yukon, Yukon.
- Percy Chapman Black b. 1878 first elected in 1940 as National Government member for Cumberland, Nova Scotia.
- William Black b. 1869 first elected in 1921 as Progressive member for Huron South, Ontario.
- William Anderson Black b. 1847 first elected in 1923 as Conservative member for Halifax, Nova Scotia.
- Edward Blackadder b. 1874 first elected in 1921 as Liberal member for Halifax, Nova Scotia.
- Derek Blackburn b. 1934 first elected in 1971 as New Democratic Party member for Brant, Ontario.
- Jean-Pierre Blackburn b. 1948 first elected in 1984 as Progressive Conservative member for Jonquière, Quebec.
- Robert Blackburn b. 1828 first elected in 1874 as Liberal member for Russell, Ontario.
- John Horne Blackmore b. 1890 first elected in 1935 as Social Credit member for Lethbridge, Alberta.
- Bill Blaikie b. 1951 first elected in 1979 as New Democratic Party member for Winnipeg—Birds Hill, Manitoba.
- Daniel Blaikie b. 1984 first elected in 2015 as New Democratic Party member for Elmwood—Transcona, Manitoba.
- David Blain b. 1832 first elected in 1872 as Liberal member for York West, Ontario.
- Richard Blain b. 1857 first elected in 1900 as Conservative member for Peel, Ontario.
- Andrew George Blair b. 1844 first elected in 1896 as Liberal member for Sunbury—Queen's, New Brunswick.
- Bill Blair b. 1954 first elected in 2015 as Liberal member for Scarborough Southwest, Ontario.
- Gordon Blair b. 1919 first elected in 1968 as Liberal member for Grenville—Carleton, Ontario.
- John Knox Blair b. 1875 first elected in 1930 as Liberal member for Wellington North, Ontario.
- William Gourlay Blair b. 1890 first elected in 1945 as Progressive Conservative member for Lanark, Ontario.
- William John Blair b. 1875 first elected in 1917 as Unionist member for Battle River, Alberta.
- François Blais b. 1875 first elected in 1935 as Independent Liberal member for Chapleau, Quebec.
- Jean-Jacques Blais b. 1940 first elected in 1972 as Liberal member for Nipissing, Ontario.
- Pierre Blais b. 1948 first elected in 1984 as Progressive Conservative member for Bellechasse, Quebec.
- Raynald Blais b. 1954 first elected in 2004 as Bloc Québécois member for Gaspésie—Îles-de-la-Madeleine, Quebec.
- Suzanne Blais-Grenier b. 1936 first elected in 1984 as Progressive Conservative member for Rosemont, Quebec.

== Blak–Blue ==
- Edward Blake b. 1833 first elected in 1867 as Liberal member for Durham West, Ontario.
- Matthew Robert Blake b. 1876 first elected in 1917 as Unionist member for Winnipeg North, Manitoba.
- Roderick Blaker b. 1936 first elected in 1972 as Liberal member for Lachine, Quebec.
- Stanislas Blanchard b. 1871 first elected in 1926 as Liberal member for Restigouche—Madawaska, New Brunswick.
- Théotime Blanchard b. 1846 first elected in 1894 as Conservative member for Gloucester, New Brunswick.
- Jean Baptiste Blanchet b. 1842 first elected in 1904 as Liberal member for St. Hyacinthe, Quebec.
- Joseph-Goderic Blanchet b. 1829 first elected in 1867 as Liberal-Conservative member for Lévis, Quebec.
- Yves-François Blanchet b. 1965 first elected in 2019 as Bloc Québécois member for Beloeil—Chambly, Quebec.
- Denis Blanchette b. 1956 first elected in 2011 as New Democratic Party member for Louis-Hébert, Quebec.
- Joseph-Adéodat Blanchette b. 1893 first elected in 1935 as Liberal member for Compton, Quebec.
- Maxime Blanchette-Joncas b. 1989 first elected in 2019 as Bloc Québécois member for Rimouski-Neigette—Témiscouata—Les Basques, Quebec.
- Lysane Blanchette-Lamothe b. 1984 first elected in 2011 as New Democratic Party member for Pierrefonds—Dollard, Quebec.
- Leonard Thomas Bland b. 1851 first elected in 1904 as Liberal-Conservative member for Bruce North, Ontario.
- Rachel Blaney b. 1974 first elected in 2015 as New Democratic Party member for North Island—Powell River, British Columbia.
- Steven Blaney b. 1965 first elected in 2006 as Conservative member for Lévis—Bellechasse, Quebec
- Kenneth Alexander Blatchford b. 1882 first elected in 1926 as Liberal member for Edmonton East, Alberta.
- Don Blenkarn b. 1930 first elected in 1972 as Progressive Conservative member for Peel South, Ontario.
- Kelly Block b. 1961 first elected in 2008 as Conservative member for Saskatoon—Rosetown—Biggar, Saskatchewan.
- Kody Blois b. 1991 first elected in 2019 as Liberal member for Kings—Hants, Nova Scotia.
- Charles Bruno Blondeau b. 1835 first elected in 1882 as Conservative member for Kamouraska, Quebec.
- Pierre Édouard Blondin b. 1874 first elected in 1908 as Conservative member for Champlain, Quebec.
- Ethel Blondin-Andrew b. 1951 first elected in 1988 as Liberal member for Western Arctic, Northwest Territories.
- Garnet McCallum Bloomfield b. 1929 first elected in 1980 as Liberal member for London—Middlesex, Ontario.
- Anne Blouin b. 1946 first elected in 1984 as Progressive Conservative member for Montmorency—Orléans, Quebec.
- Gustave Blouin b. 1912 first elected in 1963 as Liberal member for Saguenay, Quebec.
- Donald Buchanan Blue b. 1901 first elected in 1949 as Liberal member for Bruce, Ontario.

== Boc–Bol ==
- William George Bock b. 1884 first elected in 1927 as Liberal member for Maple Creek, Saskatchewan.
- Robert Bockstael b. 1923 first elected in 1979 as Liberal member for St. Boniface, Manitoba.
- Morris Bodnar b. 1948 first elected in 1993 as Liberal member for Saskatoon—Dundurn, Saskatchewan.
- Ebenezer Vining Bodwell b. 1827 first elected in 1867 as Liberal member for Oxford South, Ontario.
- Alain Boire b. 1971 first elected in 2004 as Bloc Québécois member for Beauharnois—Salaberry, Quebec.
- Randy Boissonnault b. 1970 first elected in 2015 as Liberal member for Edmonton Centre, Alberta.
- Fabien Boisvert b. 1839 first elected in 1888 as Independent Conservative member for Nicolet, Quebec.
- Jean-Marie Boisvert first elected in 1972 as Social Credit member for Drummond, Quebec.
- Maurice Boisvert b. 1897 first elected in 1949 as Liberal member for Nicolet—Yamaska, Quebec.
- Françoise Boivin b. 1960 first elected in 2004 as Liberal member for Gatineau, Quebec.
- Georges Henri Boivin b. 1882 first elected in 1911 as Liberal member for Shefford, Quebec.
- Marcel Boivin b. 1912 first elected in 1945 as Liberal member for Shefford, Quebec.
- Pierre-Ernest Boivin b. 1872 first elected in 1926 as Liberal member for Shefford, Quebec.
- Joseph Bolduc b. 1847 first elected in 1876 as Conservative member for Beauce, Quebec.
- David Wesley Bole b. 1856 first elected in 1904 as Liberal member for Winnipeg, Manitoba.
- Ferris Bolton b. 1853 first elected in 1917 as Unionist member for Lisgar, Manitoba.
- John Bolton b. 1824 first elected in 1867 as Liberal member for Charlotte, New Brunswick.

== Bon–Bot ==
- Patrick Bonin first elected in 2025 as Bloc Québécois member for Repentigny, Quebec.
- Raymond Bonin b. 1942 first elected in 1993 as Liberal member for Nickel Belt, Ontario.
- Steven Bonk first elected in 2025 as Conservative member for Souris—Moose Mountain, Saskatchewan.
- Saul Bonnell b. 1871 first elected in 1917 as Unionist member for Kootenay East, British Columbia.
- Joseph-Arsène Bonnier b. 1879 first elected in 1938 as Liberal member for St. Henry, Quebec.
- France Bonsant b. 1952 first elected in 2004 as Bloc Québécois member for Compton—Stanstead, Quebec.
- Paul Bonwick b. 1964 first elected in 1997 as Liberal member for Simcoe—Grey, Ontario.
- Charles Stephen Booth b. 1897 first elected in 1940 as Liberal member for Winnipeg North, Manitoba.
- Frederick William Borden b. 1847 first elected in 1874 as Liberal member for Kings, Nova Scotia.
- Robert Borden b. 1854 first elected in 1896 as Conservative member for Halifax, Nova Scotia.
- Charmaine Borg b. 1990 first elected in 2011 as New Democratic Party member for Terrebonne—Blainville, Quebec.
- Rick Borotsik b. 1950 first elected in 1997 as Progressive Conservative member for Brandon—Souris, Manitoba.
- Kathy Borrelli first elected in 2025 as Conservative member for Windsor—Tecumseh—Lakeshore, Ontario.
- Robert James Borrie b. 1926 first elected in 1968 as Liberal member for Prince George—Peace River, British Columbia.
- Edward Borron b. 1820 first elected in 1874 as Liberal member for Algoma, Ontario.
- Ken Boshcoff b. 1949 first elected in 2004 as Liberal member for Thunder Bay—Rainy River, Ontario.
- John William Bosley b. 1947 first elected in 1979 as Progressive Conservative member for Don Valley West, Ontario.
- Joseph Guillaume Bossé b. 1843 first elected in 1882 as Conservative member for Quebec-Centre, Quebec.
- Mike Bossio first elected in 2015 as Liberal member for Hastings—Lennox and Addington, Ontario.
- Maurice Bossy b. 1929 first elected in 1980 as Liberal member for Kent, Ontario.
- Hewitt Bostock b. 1864 first elected in 1896 as Liberal member for Yale—Cariboo, British Columbia.
- Robert Boston b. 1836 first elected in 1893 as Liberal member for Middlesex South, Ontario.
- Charles Edward Bothwell b. 1882 first elected in 1925 as Liberal member for Swift Current, Saskatchewan.

== Bouc–Boul ==
- Benoît Bouchard b. 1940 first elected in 1984 as Progressive Conservative member for Roberval, Quebec.
- Joseph Georges Bouchard b. 1888 first elected in 1922 as Liberal member for Kamouraska, Quebec.
- Lucien Bouchard b. 1938 first elected in 1988 as Progressive Conservative member for Lac-Saint-Jean, Quebec.
- Robert Bouchard b. 1943 first elected in 2004 as Bloc Québécois member for Chicoutimi—Le Fjord, Quebec.
- Aimé Boucher b. 1877 first elected in 1921 as Liberal member for Yamaska, Quebec.
- George Russell Boucher b. 1899 first elected in 1940 as Progressive Conservative member for Carleton, Ontario.
- Jean Boucher b. 1926 first elected in 1953 as Liberal member for Châteauguay—Huntingdon—Laprairie, Quebec.
- Joseph Gaspard Boucher b. 1897 first elected in 1953 as Liberal member for Restigouche—Madawaska, New Brunswick.
- Sylvie Boucher b. 1962 first elected in 2006 as Conservative member for Beauport—Limoilou, Quebec
- William Albert Boucher b. 1889 first elected in 1948 as Liberal member for Rosthern, Saskatchewan.
- Louis Charles Boucher De Niverville b. 1825 first elected in 1867 as Conservative member for Three Rivers, Quebec.
- Don Boudria b. 1949 first elected in 1984 as Liberal member for Glengarry—Prescott—Russell, Ontario.
- Michel Boudrias b. 1977 first elected in 2015 as Bloc Québécois member for Terrebonne, Quebec.
- Ray Boughen b. 1937 first elected in 2008 as Conservative member for Palliser, Saskatchewan.
- Joseph Oscar Lefebre Boulanger b. 1888 first elected in 1926 as Liberal member for Bellechasse, Quebec.
- Prosper Boulanger b. 1918 first elected in 1962 as Liberal member for Mercier, Quebec.
- Samuel Boulanger b. 1909 first elected in 1957 as Independent Liberal member for Drummond—Arthabaska, Quebec.
- Herménégilde Boulay b. 1861 first elected in 1911 as Conservative member for Rimouski, Quebec.
- Alexandre Boulerice b. 1973 first elected in 2011 as New Democratic Party member for Rosemont—La Petite-Patrie, Quebec.
- Marc Boulianne b. 1941 first elected in 2004 as Bloc Québécois member for Mégantic—L'Érable, Quebec.
- Alfred Boultbee b. 1829 first elected in 1878 as Conservative member for York East, Ontario.

== Bour–Bout ==
- François Bourassa b. 1813 first elected in 1867 as Liberal member for St. John's, Quebec.
- Joseph Boutin Bourassa b. 1853 first elected in 1911 as Liberal member for Lévis, Quebec.
- Henri Bourassa b. 1868 first elected in 1896 as Liberal member for Labelle, Quebec.
- Désiré Olivier Bourbeau b. 1834 first elected in 1877 as Conservative member for Drummond—Arthabaska, Quebec.
- Augustin Bourbonnais b. 1850 first elected in 1896 as Liberal member for Soulanges, Quebec.
- Marcel Bourbonnais b. 1918 first elected in 1958 as Progressive Conservative member for Vaudreuil—Soulanges, Quebec.
- Rodrigue Bourdages b. 1923 first elected in 1958 as Progressive Conservative member for Laval, Quebec.
- Lise Bourgault b. 1950 first elected in 1984 as Progressive Conservative member for Argenteuil—Papineau, Quebec.
- Alfred Edmond Bourgeois b. 1872 first elected in 1926 as Liberal member for Kent, New Brunswick.
- Charles Bourgeois b. 1879 first elected in 1931 as Conservative member for Three Rivers—St. Maurice, Quebec.
- Diane Bourgeois b. 1949 first elected in 2000 as Bloc Québécois member for Terrebonne—Blainville, Quebec.
- Maurice Bourget b. 1907 first elected in 1940 as Liberal member for Lévis, Quebec.
- Romuald Bourque b. 1889 first elected in 1952 as Liberal member for Outremont—St-Jean, Quebec.
- Arthur Moren Boutillier b. 1869 first elected in 1925 as Progressive member for Vegreville, Alberta.
- Pierre-André Boutin b. 1934 first elected in 1962 as Social Credit member for Dorchester, Quebec.
- Marjolaine Boutin-Sweet b. 1955 first elected in 2011 as New Democratic Party member for Hochelaga, Quebec.

== Bow–Boy ==
- Mackenzie Bowell b. 1823 first elected in 1867 as Conservative member for Hastings North, Ontario.
- Fred Wellington Bowen b. 1877 first elected in 1921 as Conservative member for Durham, Ontario.
- John Oates Bower b. 1901 first elected in 1965 as Progressive Conservative member for Shelburne—Yarmouth—Clare, Nova Scotia.
- Edward LeRoy Bowerman b. 1892 first elected in 1945 as Co-operative Commonwealth Federation member for Prince Albert, Saskatchewan.
- Edward Charles Bowers b. 1845 first elected in 1891 as Liberal member for Digby, Nova Scotia.
- Beniah Bowman b. 1886 first elected in 1926 as United Farmers of Ontario member for Algoma East, Ontario.
- Isaac Erb Bowman b. 1832 first elected in 1867 as Liberal member for Waterloo North, Ontario.
- James Bowman b. 1861 first elected in 1911 as Conservative member for Huron East, Ontario.
- James Langstaff Bowman b. 1879 first elected in 1930 as Conservative member for Dauphin, Manitoba.
- John Young Bown b. 1821 first elected in 1867 as Liberal-Conservative member for Brant North, Ontario.
- Arthur Cyril Boyce b. 1867 first elected in 1904 as Conservative member for Algoma West, Ontario.
- George Boyce b. 1848 first elected in 1917 as Unionist member for Carleton, Ontario.
- Nathaniel Boyd b. 1853 first elected in 1892 as Conservative member for Marquette, Manitoba.
- Gustave Benjamin Boyer b. 1871 first elected in 1904 as Liberal member for Vaudreuil, Quebec.
- Louis Alphonse Boyer b. 1839 first elected in 1872 as Liberal member for Maskinongé, Quebec.
- Patrick Boyer b. 1945 first elected in 1984 as Progressive Conservative member for Etobicoke—Lakeshore, Ontario.
- Frank Boyes b. 1874 first elected in 1930 as Conservative member for Middlesex East, Ontario.
- Arthur Boyle b. 1842 first elected in 1887 as Conservative member for Monck, Ontario.
- William Alves Boys b. 1868 first elected in 1912 as Conservative member for Simcoe South, Ontario.

== Bra ==
- Gerald Hugh Brabazon b. 1854 first elected in 1904 as Conservative member for Pontiac, Quebec.
- John Bracken b. 1883 first elected in 1945 as Progressive Conservative member for Neepawa, Manitoba.
- George Henry Bradbury b. 1859 first elected in 1908 as Conservative member for Selkirk, Manitoba.
- Joseph-Arthur Bradette b. 1886 first elected in 1926 as Liberal member for Timiskaming North, Ontario.
- Valerie Bradford b. 1953 first elected in 2021 as Liberal member for Kitchener South—Hespeler, Ontario.
- Frederick Gordon Bradley b. 1888 first elected in 1949 as Liberal member for Bonavista—Twillingate, Newfoundland and Labrador.
- Harry Oliver Bradley b. 1929 first elected in 1962 as Progressive Conservative member for Northumberland, Ontario.
- Bud Bradley b. 1938 first elected in 1979 as Progressive Conservative member for Haldimand—Norfolk, Ontario.
- Albert James Bradshaw b. 1882 first elected in 1945 as Progressive Conservative member for Perth, Ontario.
- Claudette Bradshaw b. 1949 first elected in 1997 as Liberal member for Moncton, New Brunswick.
- James Charles Brady b. 1876 first elected in 1926 as Conservative member for Skeena, British Columbia.
- Richard Bragdon first elected in 2019 as Conservative member for Tobique—Mactaquac, New Brunswick.
- Tarik Brahmi b. 1968 first elected in 2011 as New Democratic Party member for Saint-Jean, Quebec.
- Peter Braid b. 1964 first elected in 2008 as Conservative member for Kitchener—Waterloo, Ontario.
- Lewis Brand b. 1925 first elected in 1965 as Progressive Conservative member for Saskatoon, Saskatchewan.
- Augustin Brassard b. 1922 first elected in 1957 as Liberal member for Lapointe, Quebec.
- John Brassard b. 1964 first elected in 2015 as Conservative member for Barrie—Innisfil, Ontario.
- Vincent Brassard b. 1919 first elected in 1958 as Progressive Conservative member for Chicoutimi, Quebec.
- Maurice Brasset b. 1884 first elected in 1930 as Liberal member for Gaspé, Quebec.
- Bob Bratina b. 1944 first elected in 2015 as Liberal member for Hamilton East—Stoney Creek, Ontario.

== Bre–Bri ==
- Herb Breau b. 1944 first elected in 1968 as Liberal member for Gloucester, New Brunswick.
- Michael Breaugh b. 1942 first elected in 1990 as New Democratic Party member for Oshawa, Ontario.
- Frederick de Sainte-Croix Brecken b. 1828 first elected in 1878 as Conservative member for Queen's County, Prince Edward Island.
- Louis Orville Breithaupt b. 1890 first elected in 1940 as Liberal member for Waterloo North, Ontario.
- Cliff Breitkreuz b. 1940 first elected in 1993 as Reform member for Yellowhead, Alberta.
- Garry Breitkreuz b. 1945 first elected in 1993 as Reform member for Yorkton—Melville, Saskatchewan.
- George Arthur Brethen b. 1877 first elected in 1921 as Progressive member for Peterborough East, Ontario.
- Maurice Breton b. 1909 first elected in 1950 as Liberal member for Joliette—l'Assomption—Montcalm, Quebec.
- Pierre Breton b. 1966 first elected in 2015 as Liberal member for Shefford, Quebec.
- Andrew Brewin b. 1907 first elected in 1962 as New Democratic Party member for Greenwood, Ontario.
- John Brewin b. 1936 first elected in 1988 as New Democratic Party member for Victoria, British Columbia
- Hedley Francis Gregory Bridges b. 1902 first elected in 1945 as Liberal member for York—Sunbury, New Brunswick.
- Margaret Bridgman b. 1940 first elected in 1993 as Reform member for Surrey North, British Columbia.
- James Brien b. 1848 first elected in 1887 as Liberal member for Essex South, Ontario.
- John Wesley Brien b. 1864 first elected in 1917 as Unionist member for Essex South, Ontario.
- Pierre Brien b. 1970 first elected in 1993 as Bloc Québécois member for Témiscamingue, Quebec.
- Élisabeth Brière b. 1968 first elected in 2019 as Liberal member for Sherbrooke, Quebec.
- Harry Brightwell b. 1932 first elected in 1984 as Progressive Conservative member for Perth, Ontario.
- Robert Hylton Brisco b. 1928 first elected in 1974 as Progressive Conservative member for Kootenay West, British Columbia.
- Scott Brison b. 1967 first elected in 1997 as Progressive Conservative member for Kings—Hants, Nova Scotia.
- Lomer Brisson b. 1916 first elected in 1949 as Liberal member for Saguenay, Quebec.
- Edmund James Bristol b. 1861 first elected in 1905 as Conservative member for Toronto Centre, Ontario.
- Byron Moffatt Britton b. 1833 first elected in 1896 as Liberal member for Kingston, Ontario.

== Bro ==
- Ed Broadbent b. 1936 first elected in 1968 as New Democratic Party member for Oshawa—Whitby, Ontario.
- Larry Brock b. 1964 first elected in 2021 as Conservative member for Brantford—Brant, Ontario.
- William Rees Brock b. 1836 first elected in 1900 as Conservative member for Toronto Centre, Ontario.
- Andrew Broder b. 1845 first elected in 1896 as Conservative member for Dundas, Ontario.
- Louis Philippe Brodeur b. 1862 first elected in 1891 as Liberal member for Rouville, Quebec.
- Alfred Johnson Brooks b. 1890 first elected in 1935 as Conservative member for Royal, New Brunswick.
- Edward Towle Brooks b. 1830 first elected in 1872 as Conservative member for Town of Sherbrooke, Quebec.
- Ernest James Broome b. 1908 first elected in 1957 as Progressive Conservative member for Vancouver South, British Columbia.
- Ruth Ellen Brosseau b. 1984 first elected in 2011 as New Democratic Party member for Berthier—Maskinongé, Quebec.
- Joseph Ovide Brouillard b. 1859 first elected in 1911 as Liberal member for Drummond—Arthabaska, Quebec.
- William Henry Brouse b. 1824 first elected in 1872 as Liberal member for Grenville South, Ontario.
- Jean Docile Brousseau b. 1825 first elected in 1867 as Conservative member for Portneuf, Quebec.
- Pauline Browes b. 1938 first elected in 1984 as Progressive Conservative member for Scarborough Centre, Ontario.
- Adam Brown b. 1826 first elected in 1887 as Conservative member for Hamilton, Ontario.
- Albert A. Brown b. 1895 first elected in 1935 as Conservative member for Hamilton East, Ontario.
- Bonnie Brown b. 1941 first elected in 1993 as Liberal member for Oakville—Milton, Ontario.
- Donald Ferguson Brown b. 1903 first elected in 1945 as Liberal member for Essex West, Ontario.
- Gord Brown b. 1960 first elected in 2004 as Conservative member for Leeds—Grenville, Ontario.
- James Brown b. 1828 first elected in 1867 as Conservative member for Hastings West, Ontario.
- James Elisha Brown b. 1913 first elected in 1953 as Liberal member for Brantford, Ontario.
- James Pollock Brown b. 1841 first elected in 1891 as Liberal member for Châteauguay, Quebec.
- Jan Brown b. 1947 first elected in 1993 as Reform member for Calgary Southeast, Alberta.
- John Brown b. 1841 first elected in 1891 as Liberal member for Monck, Ontario.
- John Livingstone Brown b. 1867 first elected in 1921 as Progressive member for Lisgar, Manitoba.
- Lois Brown b. 1955 first elected in 2008 as Conservative member for Newmarket—Aurora, Ontario.
- Patrick Brown b. 1978 first elected in 2006 as Conservative member for Barrie, Ontario
- Walter George Brown b. 1875 first elected in 1939 as United Reform Movement member for Saskatoon City, Saskatchewan. Died in office, 1940.
- John Ferguson Browne b. 1920 first elected in 1958 as Progressive Conservative member for Vancouver Kingsway, British Columbia.
- William Joseph Browne b. 1897 first elected in 1949 as Progressive Conservative member for St. John's West, Newfoundland and Labrador.

== Bru–Bry ==
- Francis Carmichael Bruce b. 1837 first elected in 1900 as Conservative member for Hamilton, Ontario.
- Herbert Alexander Bruce b. 1868 first elected in 1940 as National Government member for Parkdale, Ontario.
- Gérard Bruchési b. 1931 first elected in 1958 as Progressive Conservative member for Beauharnois—Salaberry, Quebec.
- Rod Bruinooge b. 1973 first elected in 2006 as Conservative member for Winnipeg South, Manitoba
- Arthur Aimé Bruneau b. 1864 first elected in 1892 as Liberal member for Richelieu, Quebec.
- Raymond Bruneau b. 1917 first elected in 1949 as Independent Liberal member for Prescott, Ontario.
- Hervé-Edgar Brunelle b. 1891 first elected in 1935 as Liberal member for Champlain, Quebec.
- Paule Brunelle b. 1953 first elected in 2004 as Bloc Québécois member for Trois-Rivières, Quebec.
- Alexis Brunelle-Duceppe b. 1979 first elected in 2019 as Bloc Québécois member for Lac-Saint-Jean, Quebec.
- Joseph Brunet b. 1834 first elected in 1902 as Liberal member for St. James, Quebec.
- Edwin William Brunsden b. 1896 first elected in 1958 as Progressive Conservative member for Medicine Hat, Alberta.
- Dianne Brushett b. 1942 first elected in 1993 as Liberal member for Cumberland—Colchester, Nova Scotia.
- William Bryce b. 1888 first elected in 1943 as Co-operative Commonwealth Federation member for Selkirk, Manitoba.
- John H. Bryden b. 1943 first elected in 1993 as Liberal member for Hamilton—Wentworth, Ontario.
- Hugh Alexander Bryson b. 1912 first elected in 1953 as Co-operative Commonwealth Federation member for Humboldt—Melfort, Saskatchewan.
- John Bryson b. 1849 first elected in 1882 as Conservative member for Pontiac, Quebec.

== Bu ==
- Judd Buchanan b. 1929 first elected in 1968 as Liberal member for London West, Ontario.
- William Ashbury Buchanan b. 1876 first elected in 1911 as Liberal member for Medicine Hat, Alberta.
- William Murdoch Buchanan b. 1897 first elected in 1953 as Liberal member for Cape Breton North and Victoria, Nova Scotia.
- John Francis Buckley b. 1891 first elected in 1930 as Liberal member for Athabaska, Alberta.
- Jacob Dockstader Buell b. 1827 first elected in 1872 as Liberal member for Brockville, Ontario.
- Rémi Bujold b. 1944 first elected in 1979 as Liberal member for Bonaventure—Îles-de-la-Madeleine, Quebec.
- Sarmite Bulte b. 1953 first elected in 1997 as Liberal member for Parkdale—High Park, Ontario.
- Arthur Bunster b. 1827 first elected in 1874 as Liberal member for Vancouver, British Columbia.
- Christopher William Bunting b. 1837 first elected in 1878 as Liberal-Conservative member for Welland, Ontario.
- Samuel Barton Burdett b. 1843 first elected in 1887 as Liberal member for Hastings East, Ontario.
- Jacques Bureau b. 1860 first elected in 1900 as Liberal member for Three Rivers and St. Maurice, Quebec.
- John Wesley Burgess b. 1907 first elected in 1962 as Liberal member for Lambton—Kent, Ontario.
- Jack Burghardt b. 1929 first elected in 1981 as Liberal member for London West, Ontario.
- Harvey William Burk b. 1822 first elected in 1874 as Liberal member for Durham West, Ontario.
- Leonard Burnett b. 1845 first elected in 1896 as Liberal member for Ontario South, Ontario.
- John Burnham b. 1842 first elected in 1878 as Conservative member for Peterborough East, Ontario.
- John Hampden Burnham b. 1860 first elected in 1911 as Conservative member for Peterborough West, Ontario.
- Kennedy Francis Burns b. 1842 first elected in 1882 as Conservative member for Gloucester, New Brunswick.
- William Herbert Burns b. 1878 first elected in 1930 as Conservative member for Portage la Prairie, Manitoba.
- Charles Burpee b. 1817 first elected in 1867 as Liberal member for Sunbury, New Brunswick.
- Isaac Burpee b. 1825 first elected in 1872 as Liberal member for City and County of St. John, New Brunswick.
- Martin Burrell b. 1858 first elected in 1908 as Conservative member for Yale—Cariboo, British Columbia.
- Theodore Arthur Burrows b. 1857 first elected in 1904 as Liberal member for Dauphin, Manitoba.
- Andy Burton b. 1942 first elected in 2000 as Canadian Alliance member for Skeena, British Columbia.
- Francis Henry Burton b. 1817 first elected in 1867 as Conservative member for Durham East, Ontario.
- John Burton b. 1927 first elected in 1968 as New Democratic Party member for Regina East, Saskatchewan.
- Joseph William Burton b. 1892 first elected in 1943 as Co-operative Commonwealth Federation member for Humboldt, Saskatchewan.
- Ambrose Upton Gledstanes Bury b. 1869 first elected in 1925 as Conservative member for Edmonton East, Alberta.
- Pierre Bussières b. 1939 first elected in 1974 as Liberal member for Portneuf, Quebec.
- Harry Butcher b. 1873 first elected in 1930 as Liberal member for Last Mountain, Saskatchewan.
- Steve Butland b. 1941 first elected in 1988 as New Democratic Party member for Sault Ste. Marie, Ontario.
- Brad Butt b. 1967 first elected in 2011 as Conservative Party member for Mississauga—Streetsville, Ontario.
- Robert Hamilton Butts b. 1871 first elected in 1917 as Unionist member for Cape Breton South and Richmond, Nova Scotia.

== By ==
- Gerry Byrne b. 1966 first elected in 1996 as Liberal member for Humber—St. Barbe—Baie Verte, Newfoundland and Labrador.
- James Allen Byrne b. 1911 first elected in 1949 as Liberal member for Kootenay East, British Columbia.
