= Alexander McKay (politician) =

Canadian politician

Alexander McKay (April 19, 1843 – April 21, 1912) was mayor of Hamilton, Ontario from 1886 to 1887.

Born in Hamilton, Canada West, McKay was the son of William McKay and Jane Reid, both natives of Ireland. He was educated there and entered business as a hotel manager and then a grain merchant. In 1871, McKay married Catherine Marshall. After he retired from politics, McKay became a customs inspector.

Parliament of Canada
Preceded by Francis Edwin Kilvert; Thomas Robertson	Member of Parliament for Hamilton with Adam Brown 1887-1891; Samuel Shobal Ryckman 1891-1896; 1887–1896	Succeeded by Andrew Trew Wood; Thomas Henry Macpherson
