= Aemilius Irving =

Canadian lawyer and politician

Sir Æmilius Irving
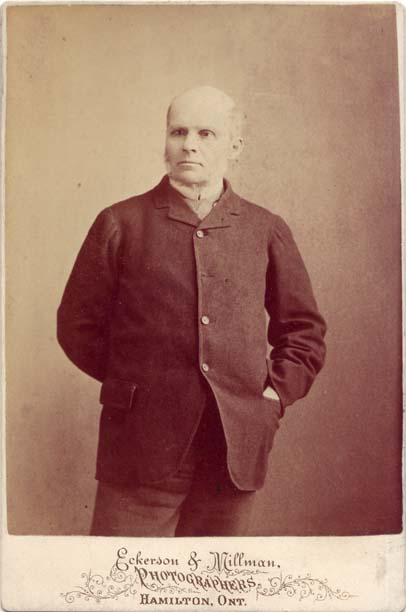

Member of the Canadian Parliament for Hamilton
- In office 1874–1878 Serving with Andrew Trew Wood
- Preceded by: Daniel Black Chisholm; Henry Buckingham Witton
- Succeeded by: Francis Edwin Kilvert; Thomas Robertson

Personal details
- Born: February 4, 1823 Leamington (Royal Leamington Spa), England
- Died: November 27, 1913 (aged 90) Toronto, Ontario, Canada
- Party: Liberal
- Relations: Jacob Æmilius Irving, father

Sir Æmilius Irving (February 4, 1823 – November 27, 1913) was a Canadian lawyer and politician.

Born in Leamington, England, son of The Hon. Jacob Æmilius Irving and Catherine, daughter of Sir Jere Homfray, of Llandaff House. He was educated at Upper Canada College, became a barrister in 1849, and was created a Queen's Counsel in 1863. In 1851, he married Augusta Gugy, the daughter of Bartholomew Conrad Augustus Gugy. He was a Liberal Member of the House of Commons of Canada for Hamilton in the 3rd Canadian Parliament. Irving served as clerk of the peace for Waterloo County and was Treasurer of the Law Society of Upper Canada from 1893 to 1913. He was knighted in 1906 and died in Toronto, Ontario in 1913.

== Arms ==
Coat of arms of Aemilius Irving

Crest
A mailed hand grasping a branch of seven holly leaves Proper.
Escutcheon
Argent three holly leaves slipped Vert.
Motto
Haud Ullis Labentia Ventis
