= Samuel Barker (Canadian politician) =

Canadian politician

The Honourable Samuel Barker PC
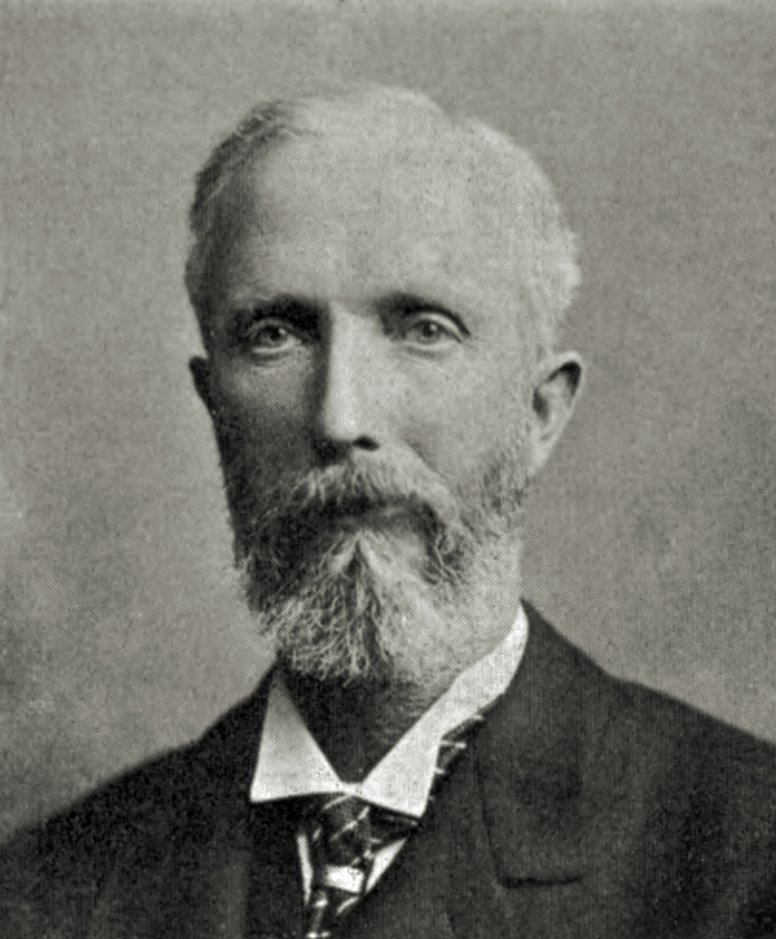

Member of the Canadian Parliament for Hamilton
- In office 1900–1904 Serving with Francis Carmichael Bruce
- Preceded by: Andrew Trew Wood; Thomas Henry Macpherson
- Succeeded by: District was abolished in 1903

Member of the Canadian Parliament for Hamilton East
- In office 1904–1917
- Preceded by: District was created in 1903
- Succeeded by: Sydney Chilton Mewburn

Personal details
- Born: May 25, 1839 Kingston, Upper Canada
- Died: June 26, 1915 (aged 76)
- Party: Conservative

Samuel Barker, PC (May 25, 1839 – June 26, 1915) was a Canadian parliamentarian and lawyer.

Barker was first elected to the House of Commons of Canada as the Conservative Member of Parliament for Hamilton, Ontario in the 1900 federal election after an unsuccessful attempt four years earlier. He was re-elected as the MP for Hamilton East in 1904 and remained in office for a total of almost fifteen years before dying in office at the age of 76 after winning four consecutive elections.

He was appointed to the Queen's Privy Council for Canada on February 28, 1913 on the recommendation of Prime Minister Robert Borden.
