= Francis Edwin Kilvert =

Canadian politician

Francis Edwin Kilvert (17 December 1838 – 21 August 1910) was a lawyer and mayor of Hamilton, Ontario from 1877 to 1878.

Born in Hamilton Township, Northumberland County, Upper Canada, the son of Richard Kilvert, he was educated in Cobourg. In 1863, he married Fanny Young Cory. Kilvert was called to the bar in 1867 and set up practice in Hamilton. After he retired from politics in 1887, Kilvert served as customs collector at Hamilton.

Parliament of Canada
Preceded by Aemilius Irving; Andrew Trew Wood	Member of Parliament for Hamilton with Thomas Robertson; 1878–1887	Succeeded by Adam Brown; Alexander McKay
