= Samuel Shobal Ryckman =

Canadian politician (1849–1929)

Samuel Shobal Ryckman (January 4, 1849 – August 16, 1929) was a grocer, real estate agent and political figure in Ontario, Canada. He represented Hamilton in the House of Commons of Canada from 1891 to 1896 as a Conservative member.

He was born in Ryckman's Corners, Glanford Township, Wentworth County, Canada West, the son of George Marlatt Ryckman and Perimela Fink. He was educated locally and in Hamilton. In 1867, Ryckman married Sarah Thornton. He entered business as a real estate agent at the age of 22. From 1884 to 1890, he also operated a retail grocery business in Hamilton. Ryckman served on the municipal council for Hamilton from 1890 to 1891. He marketed a patent medicine known as "Ryckman's Kootenay Cure".

Rykman [sic] Creek in Glacier National Park in British Columbia was named after Ryckman who was part owner of several mining claims in the area.

Parliament of Canada
| Preceded by Adam Brown; Alexander McKay | Member of Parliament for Hamilton with Alexander McKay; 1891–1896 | Succeeded by Andrew Trew Wood; Thomas Henry MacPherson |
