= Daniel Black Chisholm =

Canadian politician

Mayor of Hamilton
- In office 1871–1872
- Preceded by: George Murison
- Succeeded by: Benjamin Ernest Charlton

Member of Parliament for Hamilton
- In office 1872–1874

Member of Parliament for Halton
- In office 1874–1874
- Preceded by: John White
- Succeeded by: William McCraney

Personal details
- Born: November 30, 1832 East Flamboro Township, Wentworth County, Canada West
- Died: September 22, 1898
- Party: Liberal-Conservative
- Spouse: Adeline Davis (m. 1864; div. 1889)
- Children: Arthur Murray Chisholm

Daniel Black Chisholm (November 30, 1832 – September 22, 1898) was a farmer, lawyer and mayor of Hamilton, Ontario from 1871–1872. In the 1872 federal election he was elected to the House of Commons of Canada representing Hamilton as a Liberal-Conservative. He was re-elected in Halton in 1874 but unseated in 1875 after an appeal and defeated in the 1875 by-election which followed.

== Biography ==
He was born in East Flamboro Township, Wentworth County, Canada West, the son of George Chisholm. After the death of his parents, Chisholm farmed for a number of years. In 1837, he sold the farm and studied for two years at Victoria College in Cobourg. Chisholm studied law with Miles O'Reilly in Hamilton, was called to the bar in 1864 and set up practice in Hamilton. In 1864, he married Adeline Davis; Chisholm and his wife were both involved in the temperance movement in Hamilton. He was president of the Standard Fire Insurance Company, the Alliance Insurance Company and the Canada Loan and Banking Company. Chisholm was also Chairman of the Board of Directors for the Hamilton and North-Western Railway and served as a major in the Canadian Militia.

In 1883 Chisholm left town suddenly, having suffered a large business loss around $100,000 and used clients money to repay. He and his 15-year-old son fled to Evanston, Illinois, just outside Chicago. His wife was ill at the time, but she later came to Chicago and petitioned for a divorce, eventually securing a decree absolute. Although the legality of this divorce under Canadian law was questioned, she remarried in July 1889, to the Hon. George Eulas Foster, Minister of Finance for Canada.

Chisholm was reported to have been planning to move to Australia and his death was later reported in 1899.

His actual death date was 22 Sep 1898 as recorded on his gravemarker in Woodlawn Cemetery, Macclenny, Florida.

== Electoral record ==
Canadian federal by-election, 25 January 1875: Halton On Mr. Chisholm being unseated on petition (8 December 1874)
Party	Candidate	Votes	%	±%
Liberal	William McCraney	1,704	52.1	+2.5
Liberal–Conservative	Daniel Black Chisholm	1,569	47.9	-2.5
Total valid votes		3,273	100.0	

1874 Canadian federal election: Halton
Party	Candidate	Votes	%	±%
Liberal–Conservative	Daniel Black Chisholm	1,464	50.4	
Liberal	J. White	1,441	49.6	-2.9
Total valid votes		2,905	100.0	

1872 Canadian federal election: Hamilton
Party	Candidate	Votes	Elected
Liberal–Conservative	Daniel Black Chisholm	1,443	x
Conservative Labour	Henry Buckingham Witton	1,422	x
Liberal	Aemilius Irving	1,346	
Liberal	Charles Magill	1,324	

Parliament of Canada
Preceded by Charles Magill	Member of Parliament for Hamilton with Henry Buckingham Witton; 1872–1874	Succeeded by Andrew Trew Wood; Aemilius Irving
Preceded by John White	Member of Parliament for Halton; 1874	Succeeded by William McCraney
