= Andrew Trew Wood =

Canadian politician

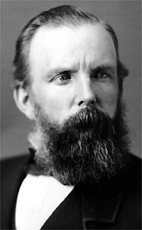
- Andrew Trew Wood

Canadian Senator from Ontario
- In office 21 January 1901 - 21 January 1903

Member of Parliament for Hamilton
- In office 1874-1878; 1896-1900

Personal details
- Born: 26 August 1826 Mountnorris, County Armagh, Northern Ireland
- Died: 21 January 1903 (aged 76) Canada
- Party: Liberal Party of Canada
- Spouse(s): Elizabeth Freeman (m. 1851; died 1860) Jane White (m. 1863)
- Occupation: Businessman; politician

Andrew Trew Wood (26 August 1826 – 21 January 1903) was a Canadian businessman and parliamentarian.

== Background ==
Born in Mountnorris, County Armagh, Northern Ireland, the son of David Wood, a merchant, and Frances Bigham Trew, he emigrated to Canada sometime before 1846. He found employment at James Shepard Ryan's hardware store in Toronto in that year; in 1848, he was put in charge of the branch in Hamilton. In 1856, he opened his own business. Wood was a founding director of the Hamilton and Lake Erie Railway Company in 1869 and the Ontario Cotton Mills Company in 1881. In 1893, he became one of the owners of the Hamilton Blast Furnace Company; when it merged with the Ontario Rolling Mills Company to form the Hamilton Steel and Iron Company in 1899, Wood served as its first president.

A Liberal, he served three terms as a member of parliament in the House of Commons of Canada. First elected in the Canadian federal elections of 1874, the election was later declared void. He was re-elected in an 1875 by-election and again in 1896 (he was defeated in 1878 and 1900). He represented the electoral district of Hamilton in the province of Ontario.

Wood was married twice: to Elizabeth Freeman from 1851 until her death in 1860 and to Jane White in 1863.

On 21 January 1901, he was appointed to the Senate of Canada upon the recommendation of Sir Wilfrid Laurier. He represented the senatorial division of Hamilton, Ontario, until his death.

Parliament of Canada
Preceded by Daniel Black Chisholm; Henry Buckingham Witton	Member of Parliament for Hamilton with Aemilius Irving; 1874–1878	Succeeded by Francis Edwin Kilvert; Thomas Robertson
Preceded by Alexander McKay; Samuel Shobal Ryckman	Member of Parliament for Hamilton with Thomas Henry MacPherson; 1896–1900	Succeeded by Samuel Barker; Francis Carmichael Bruce
