= McConica =

McConica is a surname. Notable people with the surname include:

- Jim McConica (born 1950), American swimmer
- Thomas Henry McConica (1855–1933), American-born Canadian politician
