= Halton East (Province of Canada electoral district) =

Province of Canada electoral district

Halton East Canada West
Province of Canada electoral district

Defunct pre-Confederation electoral district
- Legislature: Legislative Assembly of the Province of Canada
- District created: 1841
- District abolished: 1867
- First contested: 1841
- Last contested: 1863

Halton East was an electoral district of the Legislative Assembly of the Parliament of the Province of Canada, in Canada West. It was created in 1841, upon the establishment of the Province of Canada by the union of Upper Canada and Lower Canada. It was based on the eastern portion of Halton County, termed a riding.

Halton East was represented by one member in the Legislative Assembly. It was abolished in 1867, upon the creation of Canada and the province of Ontario.

== Boundaries ==
Halton East electoral district was located in the eastern portions of Halton County (now in the Regional Municipality of Halton). Its formal name was the East Riding of Halton County.

The Union Act, 1840 had merged the two provinces of Upper Canada and Lower Canada into the Province of Canada, with a single Parliament. The separate parliaments of Lower Canada and Upper Canada were abolished. The Union Act provided that the pre-existing electoral boundaries of Upper Canada would continue to be used in the new Parliament, unless altered by the Union Act itself.

Halton County had been an electoral district in the Upper Canada Parliament, but it was changed by the Union Act. The County had originally been split off from York County in 1816, and defined by statute as follows:

That the townships of Trafalgar, Nelson, Flamborough, the latter divided into Flamborough east and west, Beverly, and blocks number one, two, three, and four, on the Grand river, with the reserved lands in the rear of the townships of Blenheim and Blanford, do constitute and form the county of Halton, and the residue of the county of York shall be and remain the county of York.

Block number one on the Grand River was the Township of Dumfries; block number two was the Township of Waterloo; block number three was the Township of Woolwich; and block number four was the Township of Nichol.

In 1841, the County of Halton was split into two ridings for the new Parliament of the Province of Canada. The Union Act defined Halton East as follows:

That the County of Halton in the Province of Upper Canada shall be divided into Two Ridings, to be called respectively the East Riding and the West Riding; and that the East Riding of the said county shall consist of the following Townships, namely, Trafalgar, Nelson, Esquesing, Nassagawega, East Flamborough, West Flamborough, Erin, Beverley...

In 1845, when the West Riding was withdrawn to form part of the new County of Waterloo, Halton East was renamed as Halton. In 1851, it was reduced in size, with only the townships of Esquesing, Trafalgar, Nassageweya and Nelson remaining.

== Members of the Legislative Assembly ==
Halton East was represented by one member in the Legislative Assembly. The following were the members for Halton East.

Parliament	Years	Member	Party
1st	1841–1844	Caleb Hopkins	Reformer
2nd	1844-1847	George Chalmers	Conservative
3rd	1848-1850	John Wetenhall	Reformer
3rd	1850-1851	Caleb Hopkins	Clear Grits
4th	1851-1854	John White	Reformer
5th	1854-1857	George King Chisholm	Conservative
6th	1858-1861	John White	Reformer
7th	1861-1863	John White	Reformer
8th	1863-1867	John White	Reformer

== Abolition ==
The district was abolished on July 1, 1867, when the British North America Act, 1867 came into force, creating Canada and splitting the Province of Canada into Quebec and Ontario. It was succeeded by electoral districts of the same name in the House of Commons of Canada and the Legislative Assembly of Ontario.
