= Francis Carmichael Bruce =

Canadian politician

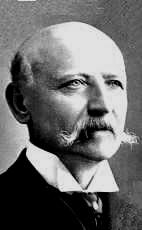

Member of the Canadian Parliament for Hamilton
- In office 1900–1904
- Preceded by: Andrew Trew Wood, Thomas Henry Macpherson
- Succeeded by: Electoral district was abolished in 1903 when it was divided into Hamilton West and Hamilton East

Personal details
- Born: 29 December 1837 Peeblesshire, Scotland
- Died: 9 July 1928 (aged 90)
- Party: Conservative Party
- Occupation: businessman

Francis Carmichael Bruce (born 29 December 1837, in Peeblesshire, Scotland-died 9 July 1928) was a politician and businessman. He was elected to the House of Commons of Canada in the 1900 election as a Member of the historical Conservative Party to represent the riding of Hamilton. He lost in the election of 1904 in the riding of Hamilton West. He also served as a councillor for the city of Hamilton, Ontario.
