= Charles Magill =

Canadian politician

Charles Magill (March 1, 1816 – December 1, 1898) was a member of the 1st Canadian Parliament and mayor of Hamilton in 1854–55, 1865–66 and 1882–3.

He was born in Westport, County Mayo, Ireland, the son of Robert Magill and Catherine Benner, in 1816 and came to Upper Canada with his family in 1832. After moving to Hamilton in 1833, he worked for a time in a store owned by Isaac Buchanan, who represented the city in the Legislative Assembly. He established himself as a merchant in 1840. In 1848, Magill married Ann Eliza Wright. He was elected to the city council in 1852 and later served several terms as mayor. Magill also served as chairman of the Board of Health, a Justice of the Peace for Wentworth County and chairman of the Board of Water Commissioners. He was elected to the last parliament of the Province of Canada in a by-election in 1866 and was re-elected in 1867 as a Liberal member for the riding of Hamilton. Magill was defeated when he ran for reelection to the House of Commons in 1872. He served as lieutenant-colonel in the militia. Magill was also a prominent member of the local Masonic lodge.

He died in Hamilton in 1898.

Parliament of Canada
New constituency British North America Act, 1867	Member of Parliament for Hamilton; 1867–1872	Succeeded by Daniel Black Chisholm; Henry Buckingham Witton
