= Adam Brown (Canadian politician) =

Canadian politician

Member of Parliament for Hamilton
- In office 1887–1891 Serving with Alexander McKay
- Preceded by: Francis Edwin Kilvert; Thomas Robertson
- Succeeded by: Alexander McKay; Samuel Shobal Ryckman

Personal details
- Born: 3 April 1826 Edinburgh, Scotland
- Died: 16 January 1926 (aged 99) Hamilton, Ontario, Canada
- Party: Conservative
- Profession: Merchant

Adam Brown (3 April 1826 – 16 January 1926) was a Canadian merchant and politician. Born in Edinburgh, Scotland, he was a member of the House of Commons of Canada representing Hamilton, Ontario from 1887 to 1891. He died in Hamilton, Ontario.
