= Caleb Hopkins (Upper Canada politician) =

Farmer and politician in Upper Canada

Member of the Legislative Assembly of Upper Canada for Halton
- In office 1828–1830
- Monarch: George IV
- Lieutenant Governor: John Colborne
- Preceded by: William Scollick
- Succeeded by: James Crooks

Member of the Legislative Assembly of Upper Canada for Halton
- In office 1834–1836
- Monarch: William IV
- Lieutenant Governor: Sir Francis Bond Head, Bt.
- Preceded by: William Chisholm
- Succeeded by: William Chisholm

Member of the Legislative Assembly of the Province of Canada for Halton East
- In office 1841–1844
- Monarch: Victoria
- Governors General: Lord Sydenham (1841); Sir Charles Bagot (1842–1843); Sir Charles Metcalfe, Bt. (1843–1845)
- Preceded by: New position
- Succeeded by: George Chalmers

Member of the Legislative Assembly of the Province of Canada for Halton East
- In office 1850–1851
- Preceded by: John Wetenhall
- Succeeded by: John White

Personal details
- Born: June 10, 1786 Frankford Township, New Jersey, United States
- Died: October 8, 1880 (aged 94) Toronto, Ontario, Canada
- Party: Reformer (1828–1850); Clear Grit (1850–1851)
- Spouse(s): Hannah, née Green
- Occupation: Farmer

Military service
- Allegiance: Upper Canada
- Branch/service: Militia
- Rank: Private
- Unit: 5th Lincoln Regiment, 2nd Flank Company

Caleb Hopkins (June 10, 1786 – October 8, 1880) was a farmer and Reform politician in Upper Canada and later in the Province of Canada.

== Early life ==
Hopkins was born in Frankford, New Jersey in 1785. His father, Captain Silas Hopkins, was a Loyalist who had been imprisoned for three years and fined £1,000 by American authorities for his loyalty to the Crown. The family emigrated to Upper Canada in 1801, settling on land overlooking Burlington Bay. (The area was later incorporated as Nelson Township in Halton County.) With his brothers, he founded a settlement called Hannahville (named for his wife, Hannah; later known as Nelson, Ontario), helped to set up the first school in the area, and chaired the first township meeting for Nelson Township in 1836. He married Hannah Green, and was a prominent layman in the Wesleyan Methodist Church.

During the War of 1812, Hopkins served for a short time as a private with an Upper Canada militia unit, the 5th Lincoln Regiment, 2nd Flank Company, employed building a barracks.

== Political career ==
In 1828, he was elected to the Legislative Assembly of Upper Canada for Halton as a Reformer, and was considered radical enough to be endorsed by the Colonial Advocate, the paper of the Reform radical, William Lyon Mackenzie. He did not run in 1830 but was re-elected in 1834. Despite his radical views, he was not implicated in the 1837 Rebellion, thus enabling him to become one of the major Reform leaders.

Following the Union of Upper Canada and Lower Canada in 1841 into the Province of Canada, Hopkins was elected to the 1st Parliament of the Province of Canada for Halton East, and immediately associated with the "ultra-Reform" wing headed by Robert Baldwin. With Baldwin's group, Hopkins voted against the principle of the union of the two Canadas into the Province of Canada, and he generally supported Baldwin on most issues throughout the first Parliament. However, he soon gained a reputation for being a maverick within the party. In 1841, he supported the District Councils Act, which was opposed by the other Reformers. In stating his support, he declared, "I came here to build up a country—not a party. I shall vote for the bill." In 1843, he sided with the Tories in opposing the move of the capital from Kingston to Montreal, and also expressed his disapproval when the Reform government resigned in protest over a dispute with the Governor General, Sir Charles Metcalfe. As a result, he was ostracized within the party, and later rejected for nomination in 1844 in favour of John Wetenhall. He decided to run as well, thus splitting the vote and allowing George Chalmers, the Conservative candidate, to win. (Wetenhall was subsequently elected in the general election of 1848).

Upon the rise of the Clear Grits, Hopkins joined them and became one of the revered "old Reformers". When Malcolm Cameron resigned from the Baldwin-Lafontaine government to join them, he was replaced in the Cabinet by Wetenhall, who was obliged to run in a mandatory byelection in 1850. Hopkins, supported by Cameron, chose to run against him, and was the winner in what turned out to be a very vicious campaign. As one of the five Clear Grits in the Legislative Assembly, he was effective in opposition, and helped to bring down the Baldwin-Lafontaine ministry in 1851. Hopkins chose not to run in the resulting election and retired from politics, later moving to Hamilton in 1870.

Hopkins came to be known as "a grand old man of Ontario Liberalism." He died in Toronto in 1880 at the home of his son-in-law William Leggo, a local barrister. At his death, he was the oldest parliamentarian in all of Canada. His pallbearers included a former Prime Minister of Canada, Alexander Mackenzie and Oliver Mowat, the Premier of Ontario, both long-time Liberals. Hopkins was buried at the Toronto Necropolis.
