= Jacob Æmilius Irving =

Canadian politician (1797–1856)

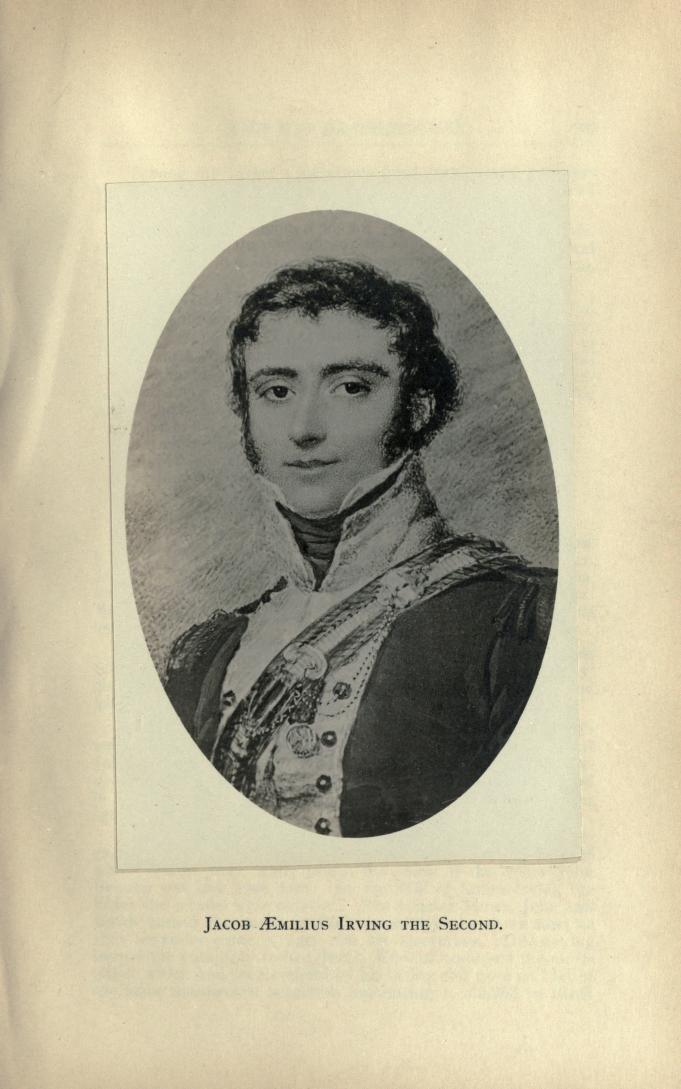
- Born: 29 January 1797; Corbett House, Charleston, South Carolina
- Died: 7 October 1856 (aged 59); Culp Street, Drummondville, Upper Canada

Jacob Æmilius Irving (1797 – 1856) was a soldier and political figure in the Province of Canada. He served as a member of the Legislative Council of the Province of Canada from 1843 to 1856.

He was born at Charleston, South Carolina. He was the eldest son of Jacob Aemilius Irving (1767–1816), of Ironshore, St. James, Jamaica, and his wife Hannah Margaret, daughter of Thomas Corbett of Charleston. Jacob's father was a nephew of Lt.-General Sir Paulus Aemilius Irving, 1st Baronet (1751–1828), Commander-in-Chief of the British West Indies. From 1814 to 1817, Irving served with the 13th Regiment of Dragoons, reaching the rank of Lieutenant. He fought at the Battle of Waterloo and received a sabre cut to the head in one of the last charges.

He emigrated with his family to Upper Canada in 1834. Irving helped suppress the Upper Canada Rebellion, serving on the Niagara frontier. He settled in Newmarket and was elected on to the Legislative Council of Upper Canada from 1843 until his death. Irving also became the first warden for the Simcoe District in 1843.

In 1821, he married Catherine Diana Homfray, daughter of Sir Jere (Jeremiah) Homfray, of Llandaff House, Glamorganshire, and granddaughter of Francis Homfray. They were the parents of eleven children, but only five reached adulthood:

- Sir Æmilius Irving K.C., served in the Canadian House of Commons. He married one of the two daughters of Colonel Bartholomew Gugy.
- Diana Irving (1825–1900). In 1850, she married William Dummer Powell Jarvis (1822–1860), a young barrister who was a grandson of William Jarvis and Chief Justice William Dummer Powell. They were the parents of four children, including (famed sailor, World War I navy recruiter, & financier) Aemilius Jarvis.
- Lt.-Colonel Henry Erskine Irving (1840–1919). He married Elizabeth (died 1875), daughter of John Innes Mackenzie, of Hamilton. They died without children.
- Emma Irving (born 1843). In 1866, she married Archdeacon Charles Gresford Edmondes, of Old Hall, Cowbridge, Glamorganshire. They were the parents of three children.
- Edward Herbert Irving (1845–1888), married Emily (died 1879), daughter of William Roe of Newmarket, Ontario. They died without children.
