= Arthur Murray Chisholm =

Canadian author (1871–1960)

- Born: July 23, 1871; Hamilton, Ontario, Canada
- Died: January 24, 1960 (aged 88); Nelson, British Columbia, Canada
- Resting place: Windermere, British Columbia
- Education: University of Toronto
- Spouse: Ethel May Stoddart (m. 1897; died 1958)
- Writing career
- Genres: Western fiction Northern fiction

Arthur Murray "A.M." Chisholm (July 23, 1871 – January 24, 1960), also known as Bob Chisholm later in life, was an author of Western fiction. He was the son of Daniel Black Chisholm and Cynthia Adelaide (Adeline) Davis. He settled in Windermere, British Columbia in 1907, where he also served as government agent, coroner, police magistrate, and Justice of the Peace.

Chisholm wrote many Western and Northern novels between 1906 and 1932, which were released by several publishers in the US and by Hodder & Stoughton in the UK. He was also a contributor to the pulp magazine The Popular Magazine for 20 years, until Street & Smith decided in 1930 to "cut out the old writers and get down to material of speedier, cheaper quality."

== Works ==
- Chisholm, Arthur (1911). The Boss of Wind River. Illustrated by Frank Tenney Johnson. Doubleday, Page & Company.
- —— (1913). Precious Waters. illustrated by Clarence Rowe. Doubleday, Page & Company. (Also known as Desert Conquest.)
- —— (1919). The Land of Strong Men. Illustrated by Frank Tenney Johnson. A. L. Burt.
- —— (1924). When Stuart Came To Sitkum. Chelsea House.
