= Henry Oswald Wright =

Canadian politician

Henry Oswald Wright (November 20, 1880 – April 25, 1956) was a Canadian rancher and political figure in Saskatchewan, Canada. He represented Battleford in the House of Commons of Canada from 1917 to 1921 as a supporter of Sir Robert Borden's Unionist Government.

He was born in West Templeton, Quebec, the son of E.A. Wright and E.A. Langford, and was educated in Ottawa. Wright served during the Second Boer War with the Canadian Militia in South Africa from 1899 to 1902. He owned a ranch at Senlac, Saskatchewan. In 1905, he married Mary Fidelia Wilson. Wright was an unsuccessful candidate for a seat in the Saskatchewan assembly in 1917. He died in Saskatoon at the age of 75.
