= Battleford (federal electoral district) =

Former federal electoral district in Saskatchewan, Canada

Battleford was a federal electoral district in Saskatchewan, Canada, that was represented in the House of Commons of Canada from 1908 to 1925. This riding was created in 1907 following the admission of Saskatchewan into the Canadian Confederation in 1905 from parts of the Northwest Territories ridings of Assiniboia West, Calgary, Edmonton, Saskatchewan and Strathcona ridings.

It was abolished in 1924 when it was redistributed into Rosetown and South Battleford ridings.

== Election results ==
1908 Canadian federal election
Party	Candidate	Votes
Liberal	Champagne, Albert	3,462
Conservative	Morrison, Thomas Andrew	2,268

1911 Canadian federal election
Party	Candidate	Votes
Liberal	Champagne, Albert	5,453
Conservative	Howell, Marshall Job	3,522

1917 Canadian federal election
Party	Candidate	Votes
Government (Unionist)	Wright, Henry Oswald	5,404
Opposition (Laurier Liberals)	Gourlay, Wallace Gordon Allan	1,693

1921 Canadian federal election
Party	Candidate	Votes
Progressive	McConica, Thomas Henry	9,156
Liberal	Champagne, Albert	1,558

== See also ==
- List of Canadian electoral districts
- Historical federal electoral districts of Canada
