= Henry Buckingham Witton =

Canadian politician (1831–1921)

Henry Buckingham Witton (October 21, 1831 – November 8, 1921) was an Ontario painter and political figure. He represented Hamilton in the House of Commons of Canada from 1872 to 1874. He ran as a Conservative Labour candidate, but took his seat as a straight Conservative member following his election in 1872.

Witton was born in South Lopham, Norfolk, England and was educated there as well. In 1860, he married M.A. Palmer. He worked as a master painter at the Great Western Railway Shops in Hamilton, Ontario. Witton ran unsuccessfully for the federal seat in 1874 and 1875 as a Conservative Labour member. Witton was appointed inspector of canals in 1879, and served in that post until 1890. He died in Hamilton at the age of 90.

Parliament of Canada
Preceded by Charles Magill	Member of Parliament for Hamilton with Daniel Black Chisholm; 1872–1874	Succeeded by Andrew Trew Wood; Aemilius Irving
