= Thomas Henry McConica =

Canadian politician

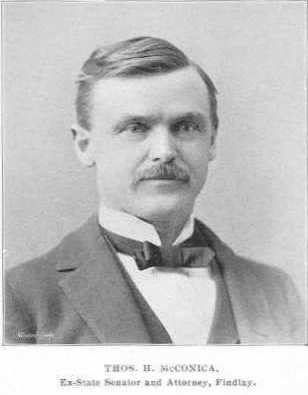

Thomas Henry McConica (September 21, 1855 – January 19, 1933) was an American-born lawyer, farmer and political figure in Ohio and Saskatchewan, Canada. He represented Battleford in the House of Commons of Canada from 1921 to 1925 as a Progressive Party member.

He was born in Fulton, Ohio, or Marengo, Ohio, the son of John C. McConica. He graduated from Ohio Wesleyan University in 1881, and from Cincinnati Law School in 1883. He lived in Cincinnati until 1887. He married Flora Banker in 1884. He practised law in Findlay, Ohio and served in the Ohio Senate from 1892 to 1896 as a Republican; McConica was President of the Ohio Senate from 1894 to 1896. Two of his sons had settled in Luseland, Saskatchewan and McConica and his wife joined them there in 1909. He served two years as registrar for the court in Kerrobert. He was nominated to run federally as a Liberal candidate in 1914 but withdrew as a candidate after a Union government was proposed. McConica died of influenza at the age of 77 after suffering from poor health for a number of years.
