= George Murison =

Canadian mayor

- Born: December 6, 1819; New Deer, Scotland
- Died: May 27, 1889 (aged 69)
- Occupation: Mayor of Hamilton

George Murison (1819–1889) was mayor of Hamilton, Ontario in 1870 and also served on city council for over 15 years.
