= John White (Liberal MP) =

Canadian politician

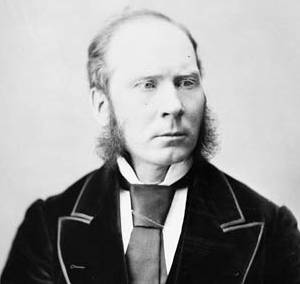
- May 1874 photograph by William James Topley

Member of Parliament for Halton
- In office 1867–1874
- Succeeded by: Daniel Black Chisholm

Personal details
- Born: June 8, 1811 Omagh, County Tyrone, Ireland
- Died: May 3, 1897 (aged 85) Milton, Ontario, Canada
- Party: Liberal
- Spouses: Mehitabel C. Post (m. 1836; died 1837) Louisa Knight (m. 1849)
- Occupation: Lumber merchant, farmer

John White (June 8, 1811 – May 3, 1897) was an Ontario lumber merchant and political figure. He represented Halton in the House of Commons of Canada as a Liberal member from 1867 to 1874.

== Biography ==
Born in Omagh, County Tyrone, Ireland, in 1811, White came to Upper Canada with his family in 1823, first settling in Etobicoke, and was educated in York, Upper Canada. He served on the council of Gore District for nine years, and then, after moving to Halton County, was subsequently elected to that council.

White was elected to the Legislative Assembly of the Province of Canada for Halton in 1851, defeated in 1854, and returned once more in 1858, serving until Confederation. In 1867, he was elected as the first MP for Halton in the House of Commons of the new Parliament of Canada, where he served until his narrow defeat in the 1874 election. When the newly elected MP, Daniel Black Chisholm, was later unseated because of bribery undertaken by his agents, White decided not to stand for re-election, and retired in favour of William McCraney who won the 1875 byelection.

White was known as a horse breeder, and several horses owned by White and his brother James won the Queen's Plate, including the first running of this event. At the time of his death, his horses had won the Plate more than any other owner's to that date. He also served as Captain and Adjutant in the 3rd Battalion, and was later, upon the creation of the active militia in 1867, Lieutenant in the 20th Halton Battalion of the Canadian militia (one of the predecessors of the Lorne Scots).

White was married twice: to Mehitabel Post in 1836 and to Louisa Knight in 1849. He died in Milton at the age of 85.

== Electoral record ==
1874 Canadian federal election
| Party | Candidate | Votes | % | ±% |
|---|---|---|---|---|
| Liberal–Conservative | Daniel Black Chisholm | 1,464 | 50.4 | |
| Liberal | J. White | 1,441 | 49.6 | -2.9 |
| Total valid votes | | 2,905 | 100.0 | |

1872 Canadian federal election
| Party | Candidate | Votes | % | ±% |
|---|---|---|---|---|
| Liberal | John White | 1,414 | 52.5 | +0.1 |
| Liberal–Conservative | G.C. McKindsey | 1,278 | 47.5 | |
| Total valid votes | | 2,692 | 100.0 | |

1867 Canadian federal election
| Party | Candidate | Votes | % |
|---|---|---|---|
| Liberal | John White | 1,422 | 52.5 |
| Liberal–Conservative | Mr. Chisholm | 1,289 | 47.5 |
| Total valid votes | | 2,711 | 100.0 |

Legislative Assembly of the Province of Canada
| Preceded by Caleb Hopkins | Member of the Legislative Assembly for Halton; 1851-1854 | Succeeded by George King Chisholm |
| Preceded by George King Chisholm | Member of the Legislative Assembly for Halton; 1857-1867 | Confederation |
Parliament of Canada
| New constituency | Member of Parliament for Halton; 1867–1874 | Succeeded by Daniel Black Chisholm |
