= Hamilton (federal electoral district) =

Former federal electoral district in Ontario, Canada

Hamilton was a federal electoral district represented in the House of Commons of Canada from 1867 to 1904. It was located in the province of Ontario and consisted of the city of Hamilton.

It was created by the British North America Act 1867. In 1872, it was assigned a second seat in the House of Commons so that it elected two Members of Parliament at each election.

The electoral district was abolished in 1903 when it was divided into Hamilton West and Hamilton East ridings.

== Election results ==
1867 Canadian federal election
Party	Candidate	Votes
Liberal	Charles Magill	acclaimed

1872 Canadian federal election
Party	Candidate	Votes	Elected
Liberal–Conservative	Daniel Black Chisholm	1,443	x
Conservative Labour	Henry Buckingham Witton	1,422	x
Liberal	Aemilius Irving	1,346	
Liberal	Charles Magill	1,324	

1874 Canadian federal election
Party	Candidate	Votes	Elected
Liberal	Andrew Trew Wood	2,086	x
Liberal	Aemilius Irving	2,083	x
Unknown	Mr. O'Reilly	1,518	
Conservative Labour	Henry Buckingham Witton	1,515	

On the election being declared void in each case:

20 May 1875 by-election
Party	Candidate	Votes	Elected
Liberal	Aemilius Irving	1,977	x
Liberal	Andrew Trew Wood	1,952	x
Conservative Labour	Henry Buckingham Witton	1,691	
Unknown	Michael Wilson Browne	1,568	

1878 Canadian federal election
Party	Candidate	Votes	Elected
Conservative	Francis Edwin Kilvert	2,252	x
Liberal	Thomas Robertson	2,214	x
Liberal	Aemilius Irving	2,005	
Liberal	Andrew Trew Wood	1,981	

1882 Canadian federal election
Party	Candidate	Votes	Elected
Conservative	KILVERT, Francis E.	2,666	x
Conservative	ROBERTSON, Thomas	2,612	x
Liberal	MOORE, Dennis	2,194	
Liberal	IRVING, E.	2,146	

1887 Canadian federal election
Party	Candidate	Votes	Elected
Conservative	BROWN, Adam	3,574	x
Conservative	MCKAY, Alex	3,571	x
Liberal	WALTER, Frederic	3,410	
Liberal	BURNS, Alex	3,402	

1891 Canadian federal election
Party	Candidate	Votes	Elected
Conservative	MCKAY, Alex	4,186	x
Conservative	RYCKMAN, Samuel S.	4,156	x
Liberal	DORAN, Wm.	3,532	
Liberal	LAIDLAW, Adam	3,474	

1896 Canadian federal election
Party	Candidate	Votes	Elected
Liberal	WOOD, A.T.	3,837	x
Liberal	MACPHERSON, T.H.	3,797	x
Conservative	BOVILLE, R.G.	3,773	
Conservative	BARKER, Samuel	3,546	
Independent	BUCHANNAN, W.W.	928	
Independent	WATKINS, F.W.	806	

1900 Canadian federal election
Party	Candidate	Votes	Elected
Conservative	BARKER, Samuel	5,466	x
Conservative	BRUCE, Francis C.	5,462	x
Liberal	TEETZEL, James V.	4,783	
Liberal	WOOD, Andrew T.	4,667	

== See also ==
- List of Canadian electoral districts
- Historical federal electoral districts of Canada
