= Thomas Henry Macpherson =

Canadian politician

Thomas Henry Macpherson (1 June 1842 – 17 June 1903) was a Scottish-born merchant and political figure in Ontario, Canada. He represented Hamilton in the House of Commons of Canada from 1896 to 1900 as a Liberal.

He was born in Perth. Macpherson was employed at a banking house in England and came to Ontario in 1871. He became the senior member of a wholesale grocery in Hamilton. Macpherson served as president of the Hamilton Board of Trade.
