= Thomas Robertson (Ontario politician) =

Canadian politician

Thomas Robertson (January 25, 1827 – September 6, 1905) was a lawyer and political figure in Ontario, Canada. He represented Hamilton in the House of Commons of Canada from 1878 to 1887 as a Liberal member.

He was born in Ancaster, Upper Canada, the son of Alexander Robertson, a Scottish immigrant, and Mathilda Simons. Robertson was educated at the University of Toronto, studied law with John Hillyard Cameron and was called to the bar in 1852. He married Frances Louisa Reed in 1850. He served as the first Crown Attorney for Wentworth. Robertson ran unsuccessfully for the federal seat in Wentworth South in 1867. In 1873, he was named Queen's Counsel.

1867 Canadian federal election: Wentworth South
Party	Candidate	Votes	%	±%
Liberal	Joseph Rymal	1,015		
Unknown	Thomas Robertson	988		
