= List of members of the Canadian House of Commons (A) =

== Ab ==
- Tony Abbott b. 1930 first elected in 1974 as Liberal member for Mississauga, Ontario.
- Douglas Abbott b. 1899 first elected in 1940 as Liberal member for St. Antoine—Westmount, Quebec.
- Jim Abbott b. 1942 first elected in 1993 as Reform member for Kootenay East, British Columbia.
- John Joseph Caldwell Abbott b. 1821 first elected in 1867 as Liberal-Conservative member for Argenteuil, Quebec.
- Diane Ablonczy b. 1949 first elected in 1993 as Reform member for Calgary North, Alberta.
- Ziad Aboultaif b. 1966 first elected in 2015 as Conservative member for Edmonton Manning, Alberta.

== Ac ==
- Sima Acan b. 1979 first elected in 2025 as Liberal member for Oakville West, Ontario.
- Honoré Achim b. 1881 first elected in 1911 as Conservative member for Labelle, Quebec.

== Ad ==
- Eve Adams b. 1974 first elected in 2011 as Conservative member for Mississauga—Brampton South, Ontario.
- Michael Adams b. 1845 first elected in 1891 as Conservative member for Northumberland, New Brunswick.
- Peter Adams b. 1936 first elected in 1993 as Liberal member for Peterborough, Ontario.
- Agar Rodney Adamson b. 1901 first elected in 1940 as Conservative member for York West, Ontario.
- Alan Joseph Adamson b. 1857 first elected in 1904 as Liberal member for Humboldt, Northwest Territories.
- John Hollings Addison b. 1929 first elected in 1962 as Liberal member for York North, Ontario.
- Mark Adler (politician) b. 1963 first elected in 2011 as Conservative member for York Centre, Ontario.
- Herbert Bealey Adshead b. 1862 first elected in 1926 as Labour Party member for Calgary East, Alberta.

== Ag ==
- Leona Aglukkaq b. 1967 first elected in 2008 as Conservative member for Nunavut.

== Ah ==
- Thomas Franklin Ahearn b. 1886 first elected in 1930 as Liberal member for Ottawa (City of), Ontario.

== Ai ==
- Gordon Harvey Aiken b. 1918 first elected in 1957 as Progressive Conservative member for Parry Sound-Muskoka, Ontario.
- Scott Aitchison b. 1973 first elected in 2019 as Conservative member for Parry Sound-Muskoka, Ontario.
- James Albert Manning Aikins b. 1851 first elected in 1911 as Conservative member for Brandon, Manitoba.
- Margaret Aitken b. 1908 first elected in 1953 as Progressive Conservative member for York—Humber, Ontario.

== Al ==
- Hélène Alarie b. 1941 first elected in 1997 as Bloc Québécois member for Louis-Hébert, Quebec.
- Dan Albas b. 1976 first elected in 2011 as Conservative member for Okanagan—Coquihalla, British Columbia.
- Harold Albrecht b. 1949 first elected in 2006 as Conservative member for Kitchener—Conestoga, Ontario
- Reg Alcock b. 1948 first elected in 1993 as Liberal member for Winnipeg South, Manitoba.
- George Oscar Alcorn b. 1850 first elected in 1900 as Conservative member for Prince Edward, Ontario.
- John Aldag b. 1963 first elected in 2015 as Liberal member for Cloverdale—Langley City, British Columbia.
- Chris Alexander b. 1968 first elected in 2011 as Conservative member for Ajax, Ontario.
- Lincoln Alexander b. 1922 first elected in 1968 as Progressive Conservative member for Hamilton West, Ontario.
- Omar Alghabra b. 1969 first elected in 2006 as Liberal member for Mississauga—Erindale, Ontario
- Duncan Orestes Alguire b. 1853 first elected in 1911 as Conservative member for Stormont, Ontario.
- Shafqat Ali first elected in 2021 as Liberal member for Brampton Centre, Ontario.
- Douglas Alkenbrack b. 1912 first elected in 1962 as Progressive Conservative member for Prince Edward—Lennox, Ontario.
- George William Allan b. 1860 first elected in 1917 as Unionist member for Winnipeg South, Manitoba.
- Henry William Allan b. 1843 first elected in 1891 as Liberal member for Essex South, Ontario.
- Hugh Allan b. 1865 first elected in 1926 as Liberal member for Oxford North, Ontario.
- Albert Allard b. 1860 first elected in 1910 as Liberal member for Ottawa (City of), Ontario.
- Carole-Marie Allard b. 1949 first elected in 2000 as Liberal member for Laval East, Quebec.
- Eudore Allard b. 1915 first elected in 1972 as Social Credit member for Rimouski, Quebec.
- Maurice Allard b. 1922 first elected in 1958 as Progressive Conservative member for Sherbrooke, Quebec.
- Benjamin Allen b. 1830 first elected in 1882 as Liberal member for Grey North, Ontario.
- Malcolm Allen b. 1953 first elected in 2008 as New Democratic member for Welland, Ontario.
- Mike Allen b. 1960 first elected in 2006 as Conservative member for Tobique—Mactaquac, New Brunswick
- Henry Edgarton Allen b. 1864 first elected in 1908 as Liberal member for Shefford, Quebec.
- Leona Alleslev b. 1968 first elected in 2015 as Liberal member for Aurora—Oak Ridges—Richmond Hill, Ontario.
- David Wright Allison b. 1826 first elected in 1883 as Liberal member for Lennox, Ontario.
- Dean Allison b. 1965 first elected in 2004 as Conservative member for Niagara West—Glanbrook, Ontario.
- William Henry Allison b. 1838 first elected in 1878 as Conservative member for Hants, Nova Scotia.
- Warren Allmand b. 1932 first elected in 1965 as Liberal member for Notre-Dame-de-Grâce, Quebec.
- Benjamin Graydon Allmark b. 1911 first elected in 1958 as Progressive Conservative member for Kingston, Ontario.
- William Johnston Almon b. 1816 first elected in 1872 as Liberal-Conservative member for Halifax, Nova Scotia.
- Fares Al Soud first elected in 2025 as Liberal member for Mississauga Centre, Ontario.
- Vic Althouse b. 1937 first elected in 1980 as New Democratic Party member for Humboldt—Lake Centre, Saskatchewan.
- Rebecca Alty first elected in 2025 as Liberal member for Northwest Territories, Northwest Territories.

== Am ==
- Stella Ambler b. 1966 first elected in 2011 as Conservative member for Mississauga South, Ontario.
- Rona Ambrose b. 1969 first elected in 2004 as Conservative member for Edmonton—Spruce Grove, Alberta.
- Herbert Brown Ames b. 1863 first elected in 1904 as Conservative member for St. Antoine, Quebec.
- Will Amos b. 1974 first elected in 2015 as Liberal member for Pontiac, Quebec.
- Guillaume Amyot b. 1843 first elected in 1881 as Conservative member for Bellechasse, Quebec.

== An ==
- Anita Anand b. 1967 first elected in 2019 as Liberal member for Oakville, Ontario.
- Gary Anandasangaree first elected in 2015 as Liberal member for Scarborough—Rouge Park, Ontario.
- Jack Anawak b. 1950 first elected in 1988 as Liberal member for Nunatsiaq, Northwest Territories.
- Rob Anders b. 1972 first elected in 1997 as Reform member for Calgary West, Alberta.
- Alexander James Anderson b. 1863 first elected in 1925 as Conservative member for Toronto—High Park, Ontario.
- David Anderson b. 1937 first elected in 1968 as Liberal member for Esquimalt—Saanich, British Columbia.
- David L. Anderson b. 1957 first elected in 2000 as Canadian Alliance member for Cypress Hills—Grasslands, Saskatchewan.
- Edna Anderson b. 1922 first elected in 1988 as Progressive Conservative member for Simcoe Centre, Ontario.
- Hugh Alan Anderson b. 1933 first elected in 1974 as Liberal member for Comox—Alberni, British Columbia.
- Raymond Elmer Anderson b. 1891 first elected in 1949 as Liberal member for Norfolk, Ontario.
- Robert King Anderson b. 1861 first elected in 1917 as Unionist member for Halton, Ontario.
- Scott Anderson first elected in 2025 as Conservative member for Vernon—Lake Country—Monashee, British Columbia.
- William Anderson b. 1905 first elected in 1957 as Progressive Conservative member for Waterloo South, Ontario.
- Bob Andras b. 1921 first elected in 1965 as Liberal member for Port Arthur, Ontario.
- Guy André b. 1959 first elected in 2004 as Bloc Québécois member for Berthier—Maskinongé, Quebec.
- Harvie Andre b. 1940 first elected in 1972 as Progressive Conservative member for Calgary Centre, Alberta.
- William Andres b. 1925 first elected in 1974 as Liberal member for Lincoln, Ontario.
- George William Andrews b. 1869 first elected in 1917 as Liberal member for Winnipeg Centre, Manitoba.
- Scott Andrews b. 1974 first elected in 2008 as Liberal member for Avalon, Newfoundland and Labrador.
- Auguste-Réal Angers b. 1838 first elected in 1880 as Conservative member for Montmorency, Quebec.
- Louis Charles Alphonse Angers b. 1854 first elected in 1896 as Liberal member for Charlevoix, Quebec.
- Timothy Anglin b. 1822 first elected in 1867 as Liberal member for Gloucester, New Brunswick.
- Douglas Anguish b. 1950 first elected in 1980 as New Democratic Party member for The Battlefords—Meadow Lake, Saskatchewan.
- Charlie Angus b. 1962 first elected in 2004 as New Democratic Party member for Timmins-James Bay, Ontario.
- Iain Angus b. 1947 first elected in 1984 as New Democratic Party member for Thunder Bay—Atikokan, Ontario.
- Carol Anstey first elected in 2025 as Conservative member for Long Range Mountains, Newfoundland and Labrador

== Ap ==
- Stephen Burpee Appleby b. 1836 first elected in 1874 as Liberal member for Carleton, New Brunswick.
- Edward Applewhaite b. 1898 first elected in 1949 as Liberal member for Skeena, British Columbia.
- Ursula Appolloni b. 1929 first elected in 1974 as Liberal member for York South, Ontario.

== Ar ==
- Joseph Archambault b. 1879 first elected in 1917 as Laurier Liberal member for Chambly—Verchères, Quebec.
- Joseph Éloi Archambault b. 1861 first elected in 1900 as Liberal member for Berthier, Quebec.
- Louis Archambeault b. 1817 first elected in 1867 as [[Liberal-Conservative Party[]Liberal-Conservative]] member for L'Assomption, [Quebec.
- Adams George Archibald b. 1814 first elected in 1869 as Liberal-Conservative member for Colchester, Nova Scotia.
- Cyril Archibald b. 1837 first elected in 1872 as Liberal member for Stormont, Ontario.
- Harry Archibald b. 1910 first elected in 1945 as Cooperative Commonwealth Federation member for Skeena, British Columbia.
- Hazen Argue b. 1921 first elected in 1945 as Cooperative Commonwealth Federation member for Wood Mountain, Saskatchewan.
- Ira Eugene Argue b. 1865 first elected in 1917 as Unionist member for Swift Current, Saskatchewan.
- Thomas Arkell b. 1823 first elected in 1878 as Liberal-Conservative member for Elgin East, Ontario.
- Ernest Frederick Armstrong b. 1878 first elected in 1925 as Conservative member for Timiskaming South, Ontario.
- Frederick Thomas Armstrong b. 1907 first elected in 1963 as Liberal member for Shelburne—Yarmouth—Clare, Nova Scotia.
- James Armstrong b. 1830 first elected in 1882 as Liberal member for Middlesex South, Ontario.
- John Alexander Macdonald Armstrong b. 1877 first elected in 1911 as Conservative member for York North, Ontario.
- Joseph Elijah Armstrong b. 1866 first elected in 1904 as Conservative member for Lambton East, Ontario.
- Scott Armstrong b. 1966 first elected in 2009 as Conservative member for Cumberland—Colchester—Musquodoboit Valley, Nova Scotia.
- Mel Arnold b. 1958 first elected in 2015 as Conservative member for North Okanagan—Shuswap, British Columbia.
- Ian MacLachlan Arrol b. 1924 first elected in 1972 as Progressive Conservative member for York East, Ontario.
- Bona Arsenault b. 1903 first elected in 1945 as Independent member for Bonaventure, Quebec.
- Nérée Arsenault b. 1911 first elected in 1957 as Progressive Conservative member for Bonaventure, Quebec.
- Télesphore Arsenault b. 1872 first elected in 1930 as Conservative member for Kent, New Brunswick.
- Guy Arseneault b. 1952 first elected in 1988 as Liberal member for Restigouche, New Brunswick.
- René Arseneault b. 1966 first elected in 2015 as Liberal member for Madawaska—Restigouche, New Brunswick.
- André Arthur b. 1943 first elected in 2006 as Independent member for Portneuf—Jacques-Cartier, Quebec.
- James Arthurs b. 1866 first elected in 1908 as Conservative member for Parry Sound, Ontario.
- Chandra Arya b. 1963 first elected in 2015 as Liberal member for Nepean, Ontario.

== As ==
- Thomas Gordon William Ashbourne b. 1894 first elected in 1949 as Liberal member for Grand Falls—White Bay, Newfoundland and Labrador.
- Patrick Harvey Ashby b. 1890 first elected in 1945 as Social Credit member for Edmonton East, Alberta.
- Keith Ashfield b. 1952 first elected in 2008 as Conservative member for Fredericton, New Brunswick.
- Niki Ashton b. 1982 first elected in 2008 as New Democratic member for Churchill, Manitoba.
- Jay Aspin b. 1949 first elected in 2011 as Conservative member for Nipissing—Timiskaming, Ontario.
- Mark Assad b. 1940 first elected in 1988 as Liberal member for Gatineau—La Lièvre, Quebec.
- Sarkis Assadourian b. 1948 first elected in 1993 as Liberal member for Don Valley North, Ontario.
- Edmund Tobin Asselin b. 1920 first elected in 1962 as Liberal member for Notre-Dame-de-Grâce, Quebec.
- Gérard Asselin b. 1950 first elected in 1993 as Bloc Québécois member for Charlevoix, Quebec.
- Patrick Tobin Asselin b. 1930 first elected in 1963 as Liberal member for Richmond—Wolfe, Quebec.
- Martial Asselin b. 1924 first elected in 1958 as Progressive Conservative member for Charlevoix, Quebec.

== At ==
- Alex Atamanenko b. 1945 first elected in 2006 as New Democratic Party member for British Columbia Southern Interior
- Ron Atkey b. 1942 first elected in 1972 as Progressive Conservative member for St. Paul's, Ontario.
- Ken Atkinson b. 1947 first elected in 1988 as Progressive Conservative member for St. Catharines, Ontario.
- Bill Attewell b. 1932 first elected in 1984 as Progressive Conservative member for Don Valley East, Ontario.
- Jenica Atwin b. 1987 first elected in 2019 as Green member for Fredericton, New Brunswick.

== Au ==
- Chak Au first elected in 2025 as Conservative member for Richmond Centre—Marpole, British Columbia.
- Robert Aubin b. 1960 first elected in 2011 as New Democratic Party member for Trois-Rivières, Quebec.
- Antoine Audet b. 1846 first elected in 1887 as Conservative member for Shefford, Quebec.
- Louis Mathias Auger b. 1902 first elected in 1926 as Liberal member for Prescott, Ontario.
- Michel Auger b. 1830 first elected in 1882 as Independent Liberal member for Shefford, Quebec.
- Tatiana Auguste first elected in 2025 as Liberal member Terrebonne, Quebec.
- Jean Augustine b. 1937 first elected in 1993 as Liberal member for Etobicoke—Lakeshore, Ontario.
- Samuel Ault b. 1814 first elected in 1867 as Liberal-Conservative member for Stormont, Ontario.
- Hector Authier b. 1881 first elected in 1940 as Liberal member for Chapleau, Quebec.

== Av ==
- Melzar Avery b. 1854 first elected in 1902 as Conservative member for Addington, Ontario.

== Ax ==
- Chris Axworthy b. 1947 first elected in 1988 as New Democratic Party member for Saskatoon—Clark's Crossing, Saskatchewan.
- Lloyd Axworthy b. 1939 first elected in 1979 as Liberal member for Winnipeg—Fort Garry, Manitoba.

== Ay ==
- Paulina Ayala b. 1962 first elected in 2011 as New Democratic Party member for Honoré-Mercier.
- Allen Bristol Aylesworth b. 1854 first elected in 1905 as Liberal member for York North, Ontario.
- Wilbert Ross Aylesworth b. 1892 first elected in 1940 as National Government member for Frontenac—Addington, Ontario.
- Henry Aylmer b. 1843 first elected in 1874 as Liberal member for Richmond—Wolfe, Quebec.
- Ramez Ayoub b. 1966 first elected in 2015 as Liberal member for Thérèse-De Blainville, Quebec.
