= Marcel Boivin =

Canadian politician

Member of the Canadian Parliament for Shefford
- In office 1945–1962
- Preceded by: Joseph-Hermas Leclerc
- Succeeded by: Gilbert Rondeau

Personal details
- Born: November 2, 1912 Granby, Quebec, Canada
- Died: April 30, 1974 (aged 61) Granby, Quebec, Canada
- Party: Liberal
- Occupation: agent businessman manager

Marcel Boivin (November 2, 1912 – April 30, 1974) was a Canadian politician, agent, businessman and manager. He was elected to the House of Commons of Canada as a Member of the Liberal Party to represent the riding of Shefford in the 1945 election. He was re-elected in 1949, 1953, 1957 and 1958 then defeated in 1962.

His father, Georges Henri Boivin, was also an MP.

1962 Canadian federal election: Shefford
Party	Candidate	Votes	%	±%
Social Credit	Gilbert Rondeau	12,421	42.02	
Liberal	Marcel Boivin	9,570	32.37	-17.72
Progressive Conservative	Claude Léveillé	7,569	25.61	-21.45
Total valid votes		29,560	100.00	

1958 Canadian federal election: Shefford
Party	Candidate	Votes	%	±%
Liberal	Marcel Boivin	13,001	50.10	-12.87
Progressive Conservative	Jacques Hannon	12,211	47.05	+10.02
Co-operative Commonwealth	Adrien Dumas	739	2.85	
Total valid votes		25,951	100.00	

1957 Canadian federal election: Shefford
Party	Candidate	Votes	%	±%
Liberal	Marcel Boivin	14,897	62.97	-5.13
Progressive Conservative	Hector Choquette	8,760	37.03	+5.13
Total valid votes		23,657	100.00	

1953 Canadian federal election: Shefford
Party	Candidate	Votes	%	±%
Liberal	Marcel Boivin	15,409	68.10	+8.81
Progressive Conservative	Jean-Louis Robert	7,219	31.90	-4.68
Total valid votes		22,628	100.00	

1949 Canadian federal election: Shefford
Party	Candidate	Votes	%	±%
Liberal	Marcel Boivin	12,993	59.29	+11.92
Progressive Conservative	Wilson Irwin	8,017	36.58	
Union des électeurs	Fernand Brodeur	906	4.13	0.44
Total valid votes		21,916	100.00	

1945 Canadian federal election: Shefford
Party	Candidate	Votes	%	±%
Liberal	Marcel Boivin	7,413	47.37	-20.87
Bloc populaire	Lindor Tétreault	4,212	26.92	
Independent PC	Patrick Edward Delaney	3,446	22.02	
Social Credit	Elzéar Brodeur	578	3.69	
Total valid votes		15,649	100.00	
