= John Sanborn =

John Sanborn may refer to:

- John B. Sanborn (1826–1904), Union Army general
- John B. Sanborn Jr. (1883–1964), judge, U.S. Court of Appeals for the Eighth Circuit
- John C. Sanborn (1885–1968), Idaho congressman
- John Sewall Sanborn (1819–1877), Canadian senator
- John Sanborn (media artist) (born 1954), American video artist
- John Robbins Sanborn (1839–1914), farmer and political figure in Quebec
- John Sanborn, a character in the TV series Revolution
- John Paul Sanborn B.Sc. Landscape Ecologist, ISA Certified Arborist, TRAQ, CTSP
