= Diane St-Jacques =

Canadian businessperson and politician

Member of the House of Commons
- In office 2 June 1997 - 27 June 2004
- Preceded by: Jean Leroux
- Succeeded by: Robert Vincent

Personal details
- Born: May 16, 1953 (age 72) Granby, Canada
- Party: Liberal Party of Canada
- Other political affiliations: Progressive Conservative Party of Canada
- Occupation: Policy advisor

Diane St-Jacques (born May 16, 1953) is a Canadian business person and former politician. St-Jacques served in the House of Commons of Canada from 1997 to 2004.

== History ==
St-Jacques was born in Granby, Quebec. She was a promotional coordinator for Agropur in Granby and an advertising consultant for a radio station in Sherbrooke. St-Jacques was involved in the community in a variety of volunteer roles. Involved in politics since 1979, St-Jacques first stood for office in the 1997 federal election as the Progressive Conservative candidate for Shefford. With Sherbrooke's Jean Charest as a national leader, the party experienced a resurgence in Quebec's Eastern Townships, and St-Jacques was elected to the House of Commons, taking her seat from the Bloc Québécois.

Until she left the PC caucus, she was its designated parliamentary critic for International Cooperation, La Francophonie, and children and youth. She was also identified as the PC "family critic."

In 1999, St-Jacques joined MPs Svend Robinson (NDP) and Réal Ménard (Bloc), both openly gay, and Toronto Liberal MP Bill Graham, in a "pink caucus" across party lines. The group advocated that the legal definition of spouse include same-sex couples. The social conservative Campaign Life Coalition decried St.-Jacques as "a married mother of one, who says she isn't a lesbian but who supports the gay agenda."

St-Jacques spoke in Parliament in favour of medical marijuana rights.

In April 1998, Charest left federal politics to seek the leadership of the Quebec Liberal Party, and Tory support in Quebec declined under Joe Clark's leadership. On September 12, 2000, with an election increasingly close, St-Jacques, with fellow Tory MP David Price and independent, formerly Tory MP André Harvey, joined the Liberal Party of Canada and the Liberal caucus. St-Jacques and Price reportedly told Clark they would leave the party months earlier.

In the 2000 election, St-Jacques retained her Shefford seat as a Liberal.

She served as Parliamentary Secretary to the Minister of Human Resources Development in the government of prime minister Jean Chrétien from January 13 until December 11, 2003, and as Deputy Government Whip under Chrétien's successor Paul Martin from February 2, 2004, until she left office.

In the 2004 federal election, she lost her seat to Robert Vincent of the Bloc Québécois. She ran again in the 2006 federal election, placing third place behind Vincent and the Conservative candidate Jean Lambert. She received 23.4% of all votes cast.

2004 Canadian federal election: Shefford
Party	Candidate	Votes	%	±%	Expenditures
Bloc Québécois	Robert Vincent	21,968	46.60	+2.65	$41,344
Liberal	Diane St-Jacques	18,725	39.72	-6.21	$60,445
Conservative	Jacques Parenteau	3,732	7.92	+0.45 (Note: Conservative vote is compared to the total of the Canadian Alliance vote and Progressive Conservative vote in the 2000 election.)	$6,910
Green	Francine Brière	1,571	3.33	–	
New Democratic	Sonia Bisson	1,146	2.43	+1.59	$400
Total valid votes/expense limit		47,146	100.00	$77,209	

2000 Canadian federal election: Shefford
Party	Candidate	Votes	%	±%
Liberal	Diane St-Jacques	20,707	45.93	+19.74
Bloc Québécois	Michel Benoit	19,816	43.95	+8.13
Alliance	Jean-Jacques Treyvaud	1,867	4.14	
Progressive Conservative	Audrey Castonguay	1,498	3.32	-33.58
Marijuana	Nicolas Cousineau	819	1.82	
New Democratic	Elizabeth Morey	380	0.84	-0.25
Total valid votes		45,087	100.00	

1997 Canadian federal election: Shefford
Party	Candidate	Votes	%	±%
Progressive Conservative	Diane St-Jacques	17,897	36.90	+25.10
Bloc Québécois	Jean H. Leroux	17,376	35.82	-19.60
Liberal	Chantal Gareau	12,699	26.18	-2.87
New Democratic	Karen Hurley	531	1.09	-0.11
Total valid votes		48,503	100.00	

== Notes ==
Parliament of Canada
Preceded by Jean H. Leroux, BQ	Member of Parliament for Shefford; 1997–2004	Succeeded by Robert Vincent, BQ
