= Charles Henry Parmelee =

Canadian politician

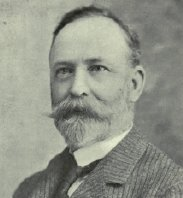

Member of the Canadian Parliament for Shefford
- In office 1896–1908
- Preceded by: John Robbins Sanborn
- Succeeded by: Henry Edgarton Allen

Personal details
- Born: June 1, 1855 Waterloo, Canada East
- Died: January 22, 1914 (aged 58)
- Party: Liberal

Charles Henry Parmelee (June 1, 1855 – January 22, 1914) was a Canadian publisher and politician.

Born in Waterloo, Canada East, the son of Rufus E. Parmelee and Eliza McVicar, Parmelee was editor of the Waterloo Advertiser from 1875 to 1880, and commercial editor of the Montreal Herald from 1880 to 1883. In 1883, he re-joined the Advertiser. In 1887, Parmelee married Christina Rose. He was president of the Eastern Townships Press Association in 1893. He also served as a member of the town council for Waterloo and as secretary-treasurer for the Board of School Commissioners. Parmelee was elected to the House of Commons of Canada for the Quebec electoral district of Shefford in the 1896 federal election. A Liberal, he was re-elected in 1900 and 1904. He did not run in 1908.

1904 Canadian federal election: Shefford
Party	Candidate	Votes	%	±%
Liberal	Charles Henry Parmelee	2,347	57.57	+2.45
Conservative	Peter Munroe Hayes	1,730	42.43	-2.45
Total valid votes		4,077	100.00	

1900 Canadian federal election: Shefford
Party	Candidate	Votes	%	±%
Liberal	Charles Henry Parmelee	2,314	55.12	-0.81
Conservative	Alonzo Chown Savage	1,884	44.88	+0.81
Total valid votes		4,198	100.00	

1896 Canadian federal election: Shefford
Party	Candidate	Votes	%	±%
Liberal	Charles Henry Parmelee	2,191	55.94	+3.34
Conservative	P.J.I. Peltier	1,726	44.06	-3.34
Total valid votes		3,917	100.00	
