= Pierre-Ernest Boivin =

Canadian politician

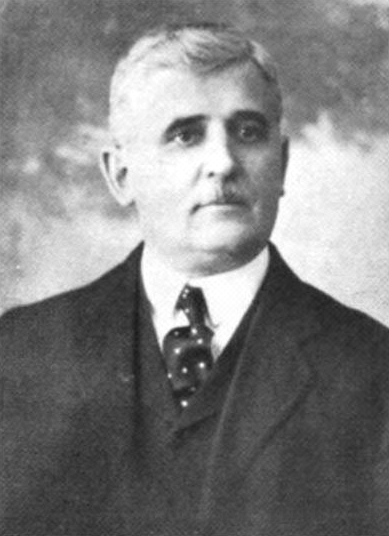

Member of the Canadian Parliament for Shefford
- In office 1926–1930
- Preceded by: Georges Henri Boivin
- Succeeded by: J.-Eugène Tétreault

Personal details
- Born: June 24, 1872 Farnham, Quebec, Canada
- Died: December 26, 1938 (aged 66) Montreal, Quebec, Canada
- Party: Liberal
- Spouse: Alma Comtois (m. 1899)
- Children: 4
- Occupation: Businessman

Pierre-Ernest Boivin (June 24, 1872 – December 26, 1938) was a politician and businessman. He was elected to the House of Commons of Canada in the 1926 election as a Member of the Liberal Party to represent the riding of Shefford. He was defeated in the 1930 election.

== Biography ==
Boivin was born in Farnham, Quebec on June 24, 1872.

He married Alma Comtois on June 19, 1899, and they had four children.

Prior to his federal political career, he became alderman for Granby, Quebec in 1916, and then served as mayor from 1917 until 1938.

He died at St. Mary's Hospital in Montreal on December 26, 1938.

== Electoral record ==
1926 Canadian federal election: Shefford
Party	Candidate	Votes	%	±%
Liberal	Pierre-Ernest Boivin	6,374	63.87	+7.10
Conservative	Louis-Joseph Gauthier	3,605	36.13	-7.10
Total valid votes		9,979	100.00	

1930 Canadian federal election: Shefford
Party	Candidate	Votes	%	±%
Conservative	J.-Eugène Tétreault	7,064	56.32	+20.20
Liberal	Pierre-Ernest Boivin	5,478	43.68	-20.20
Total valid votes		12,542	100.00	
