= Robert Vincent (politician) =

Canadian politician

Member of the Canadian Parliament for Shefford
- In office 2004–2011
- Preceded by: Diane St-Jacques
- Succeeded by: Réjean Genest

Personal details
- Born: April 13, 1956 (age 70) Granby, Quebec
- Party: Bloc Québécois
- Profession: plant foreman, union advisor

Robert Vincent (born April 13, 1956) is a Canadian politician, formerly a Bloc Québécois Member of Parliament for the riding of Shefford.

Born in Granby, Quebec, he was a foreman and union advisor before he was first elected in 2004.

== Electoral record (partial) ==
2011 Canadian federal election: Shefford
Party	Candidate	Votes	%	±%	Expenditures
New Democratic	Réjean Genest	27,575	51.09		$1,185
Bloc Québécois	Robert Vincent	12,615	23.37		$64,514
Conservative	Mélisa Leclerc	7,908	14.65		$53,500
Liberal	Bernard Demers	4,855	8.99	–	$9,662
Green	Frank Daoust	1,022	1.89	–	none listed
Total valid votes		53,975	100.00		
Total rejected ballots		877			
Turnout		54,852	64.79		
Electors on the lists		84,666			
Source: Official Voting Results, 41st General Election 2011, Elections Canada

2008 Canadian federal election: Shefford
Party	Candidate	Votes	%	±%	Expenditures
Bloc Québécois	Robert Vincent	21,650	42.82		$53,957
Liberal	Bernard Demers	10,810	21.38	–	$22,487
Conservative	Jean Lambert	9,927	19.63		$38,653
New Democratic	Simon Gnocchini Messier	6,323	12.51		$7,035
Green	Michel M. Champagne	1,848	3.66	–	none listed
Total valid votes		50,558	100.00		
Total rejected ballots		994			
Turnout		51,552	63.14		
Electors on the lists		81,651			
Source: Official Voting Results, 40th General Election 2008, Elections Canada

2006 Canadian federal election: Shefford
Party	Candidate	Votes	%	±%	Expenditures
Bloc Québécois	Robert Vincent	22,159	43.09		$46,245
Conservative	Jean Lambert	12,734	24.76		$19,667
Liberal	Diane St-Jacques	12,043	23.41	–	$53,682
New Democratic	Paula Maundcote	2,431	4.73		$1,540
Green	Francine Brière	2,061	4.01	–	none listed
Total valid votes		51,428	100.00		
Total rejected ballots		867			
Turnout		52,295	66.75		
Electors on the lists		78,345			
Source: Official Voting Results, 39th General Election 2006, Elections Canada

2004 Canadian federal election: Shefford
Party	Candidate	Votes	%	±%	Expenditures
Bloc Québécois	Robert Vincent	21,968	46.60	+2.65	$41,344
Liberal	Diane St-Jacques	18,725	39.72	-6.21	$60,445
Conservative	Jacques Parenteau	3,732	7.92	+0.45 (Note: Conservative vote is compared to the total of the Canadian Alliance vote and Progressive Conservative vote in the 2000 election.)	$6,910
Green	Francine Brière	1,571	3.33	–	
New Democratic	Sonia Bisson	1,146	2.43	+1.59	$400
Total valid votes/expense limit		47,146	100.00	$77,209	
