= Louis-Paul Neveu =

Canadian politician (1931–2017)

- Official 1966 portrait

Member of Parliament for Shefford
- In office November 1965 – April 1968

Personal details
- Born: 4 July 1931 Saint-Césaire, Quebec, Canada
- Died: 14 December 2017 (aged 86) Granby, Quebec, Canada
- Party: Liberal
- Profession: insurance superintendent, life insurance agent

Louis-Paul Neveu (4 July 1931 – 14 December 2017) was a Liberal party member of the House of Commons of Canada. He was an insurance superintendent and life insurance agent by career.

== Career ==
He was first elected at the Shefford riding in the 1965 general election. After his only term in office, the 27th Canadian Parliament, Neveu was defeated in the 1968 election by Gilbert Rondeau of the Ralliement créditiste (later the Social Credit party). Neveu was unsuccessful in subsequent bids for the riding in 1972 and 1974.

1965 Canadian federal election: Shefford
| Party | Candidate | Votes | % | ±% |
|---|---|---|---|---|
| Liberal | Louis-Paul Neveu | 9,494 | 32.82 | -3.97 |
| Progressive Conservative | Paul-O. Trépanier | 9,467 | 32.73 | +13.82 |
| Ralliement créditiste | Gilbert Rondeau | 9,447 | 32.66 | -5.18 (Note: Ralliement créditiste vote is compared to Social Credit vote in the 1963 election.) |
| Independent Liberal | Lucien Pearson | 518 | 1.79 | |
| Total valid votes | | 28,926 | 100.00 | |
