= Lucius Seth Huntington =

Canadian politician

The Honourable Lucius Seth Huntington PC
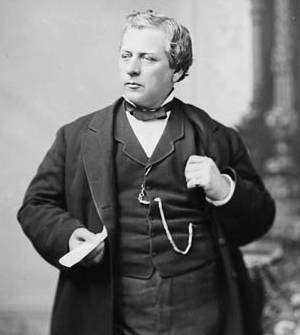
- Source: Library and Archives Canada

Member of Parliament for Shefford
- In office 1867–1882
- Preceded by: first member
- Succeeded by: Michel Auger

Personal details
- Born: May 26, 1827 Compton, Lower Canada
- Died: May 19, 1886 (aged 58) New York City, New York, United States
- Party: Liberal

Lucius Seth Huntington, PC (May 26, 1827–May 19, 1886) was a Canadian lawyer, journalist and political figure. He was a Liberal member of the House of Commons of Canada representing Shefford from 1867 to 1882. He also served as President of the Queen's Privy Council for Canada and Postmaster General.

He was born in Compton, Lower Canada in 1827. The families of his parents had come to the Eastern Townships from New England. He studied law with John Sewell Sanborn and was called to the bar in 1853. There was a surplus of lawyers at the time, so he became a merchant to provide himself with additional income. He also established a newspaper in Knowlton, later moving it to Waterloo after he was hired as secretary for a railroad company based there. He ran for the Shefford seat in the Legislative Assembly in 1860, but the election was not settled before parliament was dissolved; he was elected in the election that followed in 1861. In 1863, he was appointed solicitor general for Canada East. During the American Civil War, he profited from his ownership of a copper mine; later, the market in copper collapsed and so did Huntington's profits.

In 1873, he exposed the Pacific Scandal which led to the fall of Sir John A. Macdonald's Conservatives. He then became part of a syndicate formed to continue construction of the railway. He intended to resign from his government post to enter this business venture, but was persuaded to remain in office when the Conservatives alleged wrongdoing in his sale of his interests in copper mines, since his resignation might be interpreted as a sign of guilt. In 1875, Huntington was heavily criticized for a speech where he advised English Protestants in Quebec to vote Liberal to protect their own interests versus those of French Catholics. He fell ill later in his parliamentary career and, after his defeat in 1882, moved to New York City to seek medical treatment.

He died in New York in 1886.

1882 Canadian federal election: Shefford
Party	Candidate	Votes	%	±%
Independent Liberal	Michel Auger	1,581	52.23	+42.76
Liberal	Lucius Seth Huntington	1,446	47.77	-1.46
Total valid votes		3,027	100.00	

1878 Canadian federal election: Shefford
Party	Candidate	Votes	%	±%
Liberal	Lucius Seth Huntington	1,414	49.23	+7.23
Unknown	R. Nicol	1,186	41.30	
Unknown	M. Auger	272	9.47	
Total valid votes		2,872	100.00	

1874 Canadian federal election: Shefford
Party	Candidate	Votes	±%	
Liberal	Lucius Seth Huntington	1,618	57.99	+1.12
Unknown	J.J. Curran	1,172	42.01	
Total valid votes		2,790	100.00	

1872 Canadian federal election: Shefford
Party	Candidate	Votes	%	±%
Liberal	Lucius Seth Huntington	1,515	56.87	-0.19
Unknown	Charles Thibault	1,149	43.13	
Total valid votes		2,664	100.00	
Source: Canadian Elections Database

1867 Canadian federal election: Shefford
Party	Candidate	Votes	%
Liberal	Lucius Seth Huntington	1,317	57.06
Unknown	Parmelee	991	42.94
Total valid votes		2,308	100.00
Source: Canadian Elections Database
