= Gilbert Rondeau =

Canadian politician (1928–1994)

Gilbert F. Rondeau

Member of Parliament for Shefford
- In office June 1962 – November 1965
- In office June 1968 – March 1979

Personal details
- Born: 7 March 1928 Sainte-Élisabeth-de-Warwick, Quebec, Canada
- Died: 9 March 1994 (aged 66)
- Party: Social Credit; Ralliement créditiste
- Profession: businessman, industrialist, insurance agent

Gilbert F. Rondeau (7 March 1928 – 9 March 1994) was a Social Credit Party and Ralliement créditiste member of the House of Commons of Canada. He was born in Sainte-Élisabeth-de-Warwick, Quebec and became a businessman, insurance agent, and politician.

== Political career ==
Rondeau first campaigned in the 1949 federal election at the Beauharnois riding for the Union of Electors party, but did not win the seat.

His next election campaign was in the 1962 federal election where he won the Shefford riding for the Social Credit Party. After re-election to a second term in the 1963 election, Rondeau was defeated in 1965 by Liberal candidate Louis-Paul Neveu. Rondeau won the Shefford seat back in the following national election in 1968, and was re-elected in 1972 and 1974.

Being one of the few Social Credit politicians who was able to speak English, Rondeau helped represent the predominantly francophone party across Canada. But Rondeau's political career was ended by charges of unemployment insurance fraud for which he was convicted and sentenced to a five-month prison term. Because of these legal problems, he was ejected from the Social Credit Party in 1977 and was an independent member for the remainder of the 30th Canadian Parliament. In 1978, Rondeau became the first Canadian MP since Fred Rose (in 1946) to be convicted of a criminal offense, after being found guilty of burning a building he owned to collect insurance proceeds.

In the 1979 election, Rondeau campaigned at Shefford as an independent but lost to Jean Lapierre of the Liberals.

1962 Canadian federal election: Shefford
Party	Candidate	Votes	%	±%
Social Credit	Gilbert Rondeau	12,421	42.02	
Liberal	Marcel Boivin	9,570	32.37	-17.72
Progressive Conservative	Claude Léveillé	7,569	25.61	-21.45
Total valid votes		29,560	100.00	

1963 Canadian federal election: Shefford
Party	Candidate	Votes	%	±%
Social Credit	Gilbert Rondeau	9,989	37.84	-4.18
Liberal	Gérard Lacaille	9,713	36.79	+4.42
Progressive Conservative	Donat Marois	4,991	18.91	-6.70
New Democratic	Jacques Jourdenais	1,706	6.46	
Total valid votes		26,399	100.00	

1965 Canadian federal election: Shefford
Party	Candidate	Votes	%	±%
Liberal	Louis-Paul Neveu	9,494	32.82	-3.97
Progressive Conservative	Paul-O. Trépanier	9,467	32.73	+13.82
Ralliement créditiste	Gilbert Rondeau	9,447	32.66	-5.18 (Note: Ralliement créditiste vote is compared to Social Credit vote in the 1963 election.)
Independent Liberal	Lucien Pearson	518	1.79	
Total valid votes		28,926	100.00	

1968 Canadian federal election: Shefford
Party	Candidate	Votes	%	±%
Ralliement créditiste	Gilbert Rondeau	12,633	40.64	+7.98
Liberal	Louis-Paul Neveu	12,158	39.11	+6.29
Progressive Conservative	Paul-O. Trépanier	5,718	18.40	-14.33
New Democratic	Jean Miller	574	1.85	
Total valid votes		31,083	100.00	

1972 Canadian federal election: Shefford
Party	Candidate	Votes	%	±%
Social Credit	Gilbert Rondeau	18,803	48.53	+7.89 (Note: Social Credit vote is compared to Ralliement créditiste vote in the 1968 election.)
Liberal	Louis-Paul Neveu	12,928	33.37	-5.75
Progressive Conservative	Guy Arseneault	6,228	16.07	-2.32
New Democratic	John Philip Penner	786	2.03	+0.18
Total valid votes		38,745	100.00	

1974 Canadian federal election: Shefford
Party	Candidate	Votes	%	±%
Social Credit	Gilbert Rondeau	15,512	41.62	-6.91
Liberal	Louis-Paul Neveu	14,663	39.34	+5.97
Progressive Conservative	Louis Grignon	6,193	16.62	+0.54
New Democratic	Terry Haig	903	2.42	+0.39
Total valid votes		37,271	100.00	

1979 Canadian federal election: Shefford
Party	Candidate	Votes	%	±%
Liberal	Jean Lapierre	25,287	51.47	+12.13
Progressive Conservative	Gérald R. Scott	11,567	23.54	+6.93
Independent	Gilbert Rondeau	6,454	13.14	
Social Credit	Murielle Audette	3,922	7.98	-33.64
New Democratic	Denis Boisse	1,008	2.05	-0.37
Rhinoceros	Lyse Dumouchel	770	1.57	
Union populaire	Gilles Maille	121	0.25	
Total valid votes		49,129	100.00	

== Death ==
Rondeau died on 9 March 1994 due to complications following gallstone removal surgery.
