= Réjean Genest =

Canadian politician

Member of Parliament for Shefford
- In office 30 May 2011 – 4 August 2015
- Preceded by: Robert Vincent
- Succeeded by: Pierre Breton

Personal details
- Born: 9 March 1946 Saint-Raymond de Portneuf, Quebec
- Died: 26 December 2023 (aged 77) Granby, Quebec
- Party: New Democratic Party
- Spouse: Louise Lecours
- Profession: Author, gardener, horticulturalist

Réjean Genest (9 March 1946 – 26 December 2023) was a Canadian politician, who was elected to the House of Commons of Canada in the 2011 election. He represented the electoral district of Shefford as a member of the New Democratic Party.

He was formerly a meteorologist. At the time of his election, he was a horticulturalist and editor of Les Beaux Jardins online magazine.

Genest did not stand for re-election in 2015.

It was reported in 2018 that Genest was recruited by the Green Party to be its candidate for Shefford in the 2019 election. He dismissed the rumors as untrue.

Genest died in Granby on 26 December 2023 aged 77.

== Electoral record ==
2011 Canadian federal election: Shefford
Party	Candidate	Votes	%	±%	Expenditures
New Democratic	Réjean Genest	27,575	51.09		$1,185
Bloc Québécois	Robert Vincent	12,615	23.37		$64,514
Conservative	Mélisa Leclerc	7,908	14.65		$53,500
Liberal	Bernard Demers	4,855	8.99	–	$9,662
Green	Frank Daoust	1,022	1.89	–	none listed
Total valid votes		53,975	100.00		
Total rejected ballots		877			
Turnout		54,852	64.79		
Electors on the lists		84,666			
Source: Official Voting Results, 41st General Election 2011, Elections Canada
