= Andréanne Larouche =

Canadian politician

Andréanne Larouche MP

Member of Parliament for Shefford
- Incumbent
- Assumed office October 21, 2019
- Preceded by: Pierre Breton

Personal details
- Party: Bloc Québécois

Andréanne Larouche MP is a Canadian politician, who was elected to the House of Commons of Canada in the 2019 election. She represents the electoral district of Shefford as a member of the Bloc Québécois.

== Political career ==
She served as the critic of seniors, the status of Women and gender equality in the Bloc Québécois Shadow Cabinet of the 44th Parliament of Canada.

She was elected vice chair of the Canadian House of Commons Standing Committee on the Status of Women in the 45th Canadian Parliament in 2025.

== Electoral record ==
2025 Canadian federal election: Shefford
Party	Candidate	Votes	%	±%	Expenditures
Bloc Québécois	Andréanne Larouche	26,726	40.11	−1.81	
Liberal	Felix Dionne	26,155	39.25	+5.76	
Conservative	James Seale	11,404	17.12	+4.99	
New Democratic	Patrick Jasmin	1,557	2.34	−2.98	
People's	Susanne Lefebvre	789	1.18	−2.30	
Total valid votes/expense limit		66,631	98.29		
Total rejected ballots		1,156	1.71		
Turnout		67,787	70.50		
Eligible voters		96,155			
Bloc Québécois hold		Swing		−3.79	
Source: Elections Canada
Note: number of eligible voters does not include voting day registrations.

2019 Canadian federal election: Shefford
Party	Candidate	Votes	%	±%	Expenditures
Bloc Québécois	Andréanne Larouche	23,503	38.58	+16.36	$6,576.43
Liberal	Pierre Breton	22,605	37.11	-1.85	none listed
Conservative	Nathalie Clermont	7,495	12.30	-0.47	$32,903.14
New Democratic	Raymonde Plamondon	3,705	6.08	-17.59	none listed
Green	Katherine Turgeon	2,814	4.62	+2.25	none listed
People's	Mariam Sabbagh	497	0.82		$0.00
Indépendance du Québec	Darlène Daviault	294	0.48		$0.00
Total valid votes/expense limit		60,913	97.89		
Total rejected ballots		1,313	2.11	-0.05	
Turnout		62,226	68.28	+0.26	
Eligible voters		91,138			
Bloc Québécois gain from Liberal		Swing		+9.11	
Source: Elections Canada
