= Jean Leroux =

Canadian politician

Jean H. Leroux

Member of Parliament for Shefford
- In office 1993–1997
- Preceded by: Jean Lapierre
- Succeeded by: Diane St-Jacques

Personal details
- Born: Jean H. Leroux; 6 February 1949 (age 77) Granby, Quebec
- Party: Bloc Québécois
- Profession: teacher

Jean H. Leroux (born 6 February 1949) was a member of the House of Commons of Canada from 1993 to 1997. Born in Granby, Quebec, he is a teacher by career.

He was elected in the Shefford electoral district under the Bloc Québécois party in the 1993 federal election, thus he served in the 35th Canadian Parliament. He was defeated by Progressive Conservative candidate Diane St-Jacques in the 1997 federal election and left Canadian politics after that.

1993 Canadian federal election: Shefford
Party	Candidate	Votes	%	±%
Bloc Québécois	Jean Leroux	27,001	55.42	
Liberal	Roger Légaré	14,152	29.05	-19.19
Progressive Conservative	Jocelyn Compagnat	5,750	11.80	-31.41
Natural Law	Michèle Beausoleil	758	1.56	
New Democratic	Marielle Sanna	586	1.20	-7.34
Abolitionist	Denis Loubier	470	0.96	
Total valid votes		48,717	100.00	
