= Pierre Breton =

Canadian Liberal politician

Member of Parliament for Shefford
- In office October 19, 2015 – September 11, 2019
- Preceded by: Réjean Genest
- Succeeded by: Andréanne Larouche

Personal details
- Born: October 3, 1966 (age 59) Granby, Quebec
- Party: Liberal
- Education: Université du Québec à Montréal

Pierre Breton (born October 3, 1966) is a Canadian Liberal politician who was elected as a Member of Parliament in the House of Commons of Canada to represent the federal electoral district of Shefford during the 2015 Canadian federal election. He was defeated in the 2019 Canadian federal election.

Breton was born in Granby, Quebec, and attended the Université du Québec à Montréal, earning a degree in business administration. He worked for a number of companies, including Bombardier and Viasystems Canada. From 2003 until his election to Parliament, he was a business partner in the human resources department for the Société des alcools du Québec.

He began his involvement in politics by volunteering on the campaigns of Jean Lapierre, the Liberal MP for Shefford from 1979 to 1993. In 2005, he was elected as an independent to the city council of Granby, and held that position until his election to the House of Commons.

== Electoral record ==
2021 Canadian federal election: Shefford
Party	Candidate	Votes	%	±%	Expenditures
Bloc Québécois	Andréanne Larouche	24,997	41.9	+3.3	$31,772.48
Liberal	Pierre Breton	19,968	33.5	-3.6	$84,958.35
Conservative	Céline Lalancette	7,234	12.1	-0.2	$6,814.84
New Democratic	Patrick Jasmin	3,173	5.3	-0.8	$1,243.21
People's	Gerda Scheider	2,073	3.5	+2.7	$2,379.78
Green	Mathieu Morin	1,059	1.8	-2.8	$0.00
Free	Joel Lacroix	599	1.0	N/A	$2,821.90
Marijuana	Yannick Brisebois	284	0.5	N/A	none listed
Indépendance du Québec	Jean-Philippe Beaudry-Graham	239	0.4	-0.1	$0.00
Total valid votes/expense limit		59,626	97.7	–	$121,523.31
Total rejected ballots		1,409	2.3		
Turnout		61,035	65.2		
Eligible voters		93,597			
Bloc Québécois hold		Swing		+3.5	
Source: Elections Canada

2019 Canadian federal election: Shefford
Party	Candidate	Votes	%	±%	Expenditures
Bloc Québécois	Andréanne Larouche	23,503	38.58	+16.36	$6,576.43
Liberal	Pierre Breton	22,605	37.11	-1.85	none listed
Conservative	Nathalie Clermont	7,495	12.30	-0.47	$32,903.14
New Democratic	Raymonde Plamondon	3,705	6.08	-17.59	none listed
Green	Katherine Turgeon	2,814	4.62	+2.25	none listed
People's	Mariam Sabbagh	497	0.82		$0.00
Indépendance du Québec	Darlène Daviault	294	0.48		$0.00
Total valid votes/expense limit		60,913	97.89		
Total rejected ballots		1,313	2.11	-0.05	
Turnout		62,226	68.28	+0.26	
Eligible voters		91,138			
Bloc Québécois gain from Liberal		Swing		+9.11	
Source: Elections Canada
