= Georges Henri Boivin =

Canadian politician

The Hon. Georges Henri Boivin
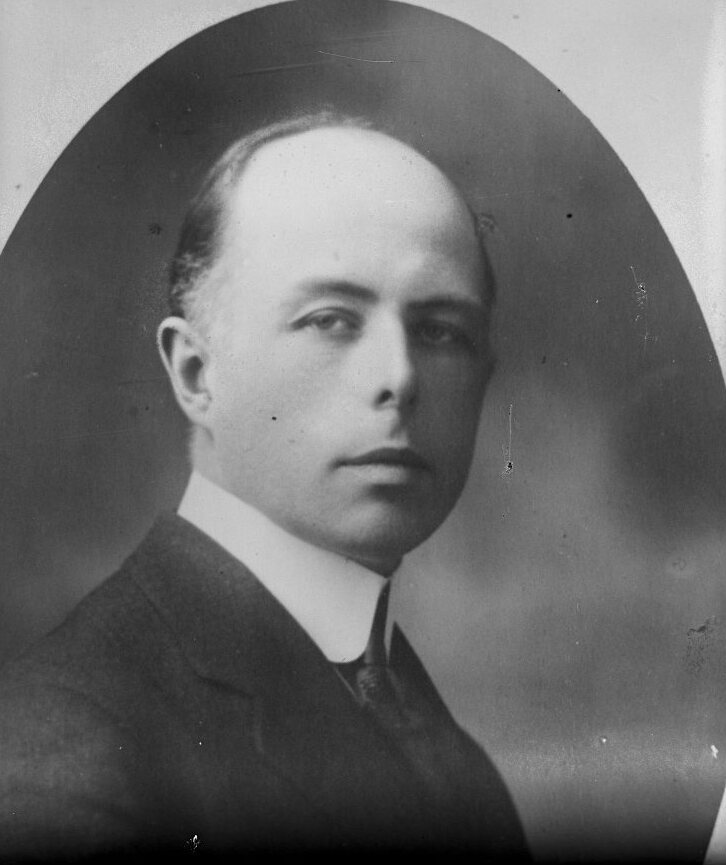
- Boivin, c. 1925

Member of the Canadian Parliament for Shefford
- In office 1911–1926
- Preceded by: Henry Edgarton Allen
- Succeeded by: Pierre-Ernest Boivin

Personal details
- Born: 26 December 1882 Granby, Quebec, Canada
- Died: 7 August 1926 (aged 43) Philadelphia, PA
- Party: Liberal
- Spouse: Helene Comeau
- Children: Marcel Boivin
- Education: Laval University

Georges Henri Boivin, PC KC (26 December 1882 – 7 August 1926) was a Canadian politician.

Born in Granby, Quebec, the son of Henri Boivin and Sarah Bray, Boivin was educated at Granby Academy, Granby St. Joseph's College, and Sainte-Marie-de-Monnoir College in Marieville, QC. He received a Bachelor of Arts degree in 1902 from Laval University in Quebec City. He studied law at the offices of Greenshields, Greenshields, Heneker & Mitchell in Montreal, and was admitted to the bar of the Province of Quebec in 1907. From 1907 to 1912, he was an advocate and barrister with the law firm of McKeown & Boivin in Sweetsburg (now Cowansville), Quebec. In 1907, he was appointed Crown Prosecutor for the District of Bedford.

He was elected to the House of Commons of Canada for the Quebec riding of Shefford in the 1911 federal election. A Liberal, he was re-elected in 1917, 1921, and 1925. From 1918 to 1921, he was the Deputy Speaker and Chairman of Committees of the Whole of the House of Commons. From 1925 to 1926, he was the Minister of Customs and Excise.

He married Hélène Comeau in 1908, and they had three children: Sarah Marguerite, James Joseph Henri, and Marcel Georges Wilfrid, who also served as an MP. Boivin died in August 1926 from complications of appendicitis while attending a Knights of Columbus convention in Philadelphia, Pennsylvania.

1925 Canadian federal election: Shefford
| Party | Candidate | Votes | % | ±% |
|---|---|---|---|---|
| Liberal | Georges Henri Boivin | 5,910 | 56.78 | -13.78 |
| Conservative | James Davidson | 4,499 | 43.22 | |
| Total valid votes | | 10,409 | 100.00 | |

1921 Canadian federal election: Shefford
| Party | Candidate | Votes | % |
|---|---|---|---|
| Liberal | Georges Henri Boivin | 6,318 | 70.56 |
| Independent | Hormisdas Beaudry | 2,636 | 29.44 |
| Total valid votes | | 8,954 | 100.00 |

1917 Canadian federal election: Shefford
| Party | Candidate | Votes |
|---|---|---|
| Opposition (Laurier Liberals) | Georges Henri Boivin | acclaimed |

1911 Canadian federal election: Shefford
| Party | Candidate | Votes | % | ±% |
|---|---|---|---|---|
| Liberal | Georges Henri Boivin | 2,271 | 50.29 | -3.03 |
| Conservative | James Davidson | 2,245 | 49.71 | +3.03 |
| Total valid votes | | 4,516 | 100.00 | |
