= Joseph-Hermas Leclerc =

Canadian politician

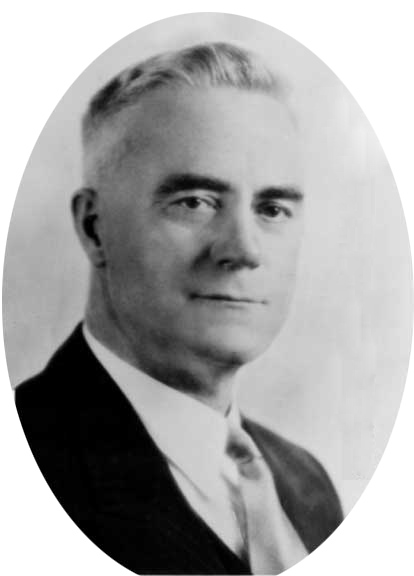
- Joseph-Hermas Leclerc around 1940

Member of Parliament for Shefford
- In office October 1935 – April 1945

Personal details
- Born: 12 July 1877 Saint-Germain-de-Grantham, Quebec
- Died: 4 October 1945 (aged 68)
- Party: Liberal
- Spouse(s): Clara Messier m. 20 Jan 1904
- Profession: industrialist

Joseph-Hermas Leclerc (12 July 1877 – 4 October 1945) was a Liberal party member of the House of Commons of Canada. He was born in Saint-Germain-de-Grantham, Quebec in Drummond County and became an industrialist by career.

Leclerc served as an alderman of Granby, Quebec for 6 years, then was the community's mayor from 1933 to 1939.

He was first elected to Parliament at the Shefford riding in the 1935 general election and re-elected there in 1940. After his second term in the House of Commons, Leclerc did not seek further re-election in the 1945 federal election.

1940 Canadian federal election: Shefford
Party	Candidate	Votes	%	±%
Liberal	Joseph-Hermas Leclerc	7,831	68.24	+16.67
National Government	Hector Choquette	3,644	31.76	-16.67 (Note: National Government vote is compared to the Conservative vote in the 1935 election.)
Total valid votes		11,475	100.00	
