= J.-Eugène Tétreault =

Canadian politician

Member of Parliament for Shefford
- In office July 1930 – 1935

Personal details
- Born: 28 September 1884 Saint-Valérien, Quebec
- Died: 24 December 1944 (aged 60) Granby, Quebec
- Party: Conservative
- Spouse(s): Ida Dion m. 16 September 1913
- Profession: merchant

J.-Eugène Tétreault (28 September 1884 – 24 December 1944) was a Conservative member of the House of Commons of Canada. He was born in Saint-Valérien, Quebec and became a merchant, notably the president of N. Mitchell Company and a director of Dominion Automatic Gate Company Ltd.

He was first elected to Parliament at the Shefford riding in the 1930 general election and served only one term in the House of Commons. Tétreault did not seek re-election in 1935.

1930 Canadian federal election: Shefford
Party	Candidate	Votes	%	±%
Conservative	J.-Eugène Tétreault	7,064	56.32	+20.20
Liberal	Pierre-Ernest Boivin	5,478	43.68	-20.20
Total valid votes		12,542	100.00	
