= Henry Edgarton Allen =

Canadian politician

Member of Parliament for Shefford (1908-1911)
- In office 1908–1911
- Preceded by: Charles Henry Parmelee
- Succeeded by: Georges Henri Boivin

Personal details
- Born: 14 December 1864 Waterloo, Canada East
- Died: 28 December 1924 (aged 60)
- Party: Liberal
- Profession: merchant

Henry Edgarton Allen (14 December 1864 – 28 December 1924) was a Canadian politician and merchant. He was elected in 1908 to the House of Commons of Canada as a member of the Liberal Party representing the riding of Shefford.

1908 Canadian federal election: Shefford
Party	Candidate	Votes	%	±%
Liberal	Henry Edgarton Allen	2,465	53.32	-4.25
Conservative	William H. Robinson	2,158	46.68	+4.25
Total valid votes		4,623	100.00	
