= Michel Auger (politician) =

Canadian politician

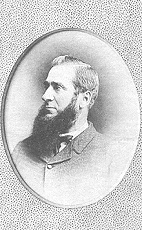

Member of Parliament for Shefford
- In office 1882–1887
- Preceded by: Lucius Seth Huntington
- Succeeded by: Antoine Audet

Personal details
- Born: November 18, 1830 St. Pie, Lower Canada
- Died: May 12, 1909 (aged 78) Toronto, Ontario, Canada
- Party: Independent Liberal
- Spouse: Priscilla Nicol
- Profession: farmer, mill owner

Michel Auger (November 18, 1830 – May 12, 1909) was a Canadian politician, farmer and mill owner. He was elected to the House of Commons of Canada in the 1882 federal election as an Independent Liberal, representing the riding of Shefford.

Born in Saint-Pie, Lower Canada, Auger was educated at the Grand Ligne Mission School and at the Hamilton Academy in Hamilton, New York. In 1856, he married Priscilla Nicol. Auger served five years as mayor of Sainte-Prudentienne, a village now within the municipality of Roxton Pond.

He first ran in the 1878 election as an Independent Liberal in opposition to the party's incumbent MP Lucius Seth Huntington, but was defeated by Huntington. In 1882, however, local Conservative supporters swung solidly behind Auger in a bid to punish Huntington for his role in exposing the Pacific Scandal, resulting in Auger's election.

He ran for reelection in the 1887 election as an Independent Liberal, but was defeated by Conservative Antoine Audet. He died in Toronto in 1909.

1887 Canadian federal election: Shefford
Party	Candidate	Votes	%	±%
Conservative	Antoine Audet	1,671	50.47	
Independent Liberal	M. Auger	1,640	49.53	-2.70
Total valid votes		3,311	100.00	

1882 Canadian federal election: Shefford
Party	Candidate	Votes	%	±%
Independent Liberal	Michel Auger	1,581	52.23	+42.76
Liberal	Lucius Seth Huntington	1,446	47.77	-1.46
Total valid votes		3,027	100.00	

1878 Canadian federal election: Shefford
Party	Candidate	Votes	%	±%
Liberal	Lucius Seth Huntington	1,414	49.23	+7.23
Unknown	R. Nicol	1,186	41.30	
Unknown	M. Auger	272	9.47	
Total valid votes		2,872	100.00	
