= Shefford (federal electoral district) =

Federal electoral district in Quebec, Canada

Quebec electoral district
- Interactive map of riding boundaries from the 2015 federal election

Federal electoral district
- Legislature: House of Commons
MP
Andréanne Larouche
Bloc Québécois
- District created: 1867
- First contested: 1867
- Last contested: 2025
- District webpage: profile, map

Demographics
- Population (2011): 107,538
- Electors (2015): 87,902
- Area (km²): 1,434
- Pop. density (per km²): 75
- Census subdivision(s): Granby, Shefford, Saint-Césaire, Waterloo, Roxton Pond, Saint-Alphonse-de-Granby, Ange-Gardien, Saint-Paul-d'Abbotsford, Rougemont, Sainte-Cécile-de-Milton

Shefford is a federal electoral district in southern Quebec, Canada. It is one of only four electoral districts that has been continually represented in the House of Commons of Canada since confederation in 1867, the other three being Beauce central Quebec, Halifax in Nova Scotia, and Simcoe North in Ontario.

== Demographics ==
Ethnic groups: 99.2% White
Languages: 95.2% French, 3.2% English
Religions: 90.3% Catholic, 3.8% Protestant, 4.7% no religious affiliation
Average income: $25,354

== Geography ==
This southern Quebec riding extends from Sherbrooke in the east to Montreal in the west, straddling the Quebec regions of Montérégie and Estrie.

The district includes the central and eastern Rouville Regional County Municipality, all of La Haute-Yamaska (except Bromont) and southwestern Le Val-Saint-François Regional County Municipality. The main communities are Granby, Roxton Pond, Saint-Césaire, Saint-Alphonse, Valcourt, Waterloo, Saint-Paul-d'Abbotsford, Shefford, Granby Township, and Rougemont. The area is 1,428 km^{2}.

The neighbouring ridings are Brome—Missisquoi, Saint-Jean, Belœil—Chambly, Saint-Hyacinthe—Bagot—Acton, Drummond, and Richmond—Arthabaska—des-Sources.

== History ==
The electoral district was created in the British North America Act 1867.

The 2012 electoral redistribution saw this riding gain a small fraction of territory from Brome—Missisquoi.

=== Members of Parliament ===
This riding has elected the following members of Parliament:

Parliament	Years	Member	Party
Shefford
1st	1867–1872	Lucius Seth Huntington	Liberal
2nd	1872–1874	Lucius Seth Huntington	Liberal
3rd	1874–1878	Lucius Seth Huntington	Liberal
4th	1878–1882	Lucius Seth Huntington	Liberal
5th	1882–1887	Michel Auger	Independent Liberal
6th	1887–1891	Antoine Audet	Conservative
7th	1891–1896	John Robbins Sanborn	Liberal
8th	1896–1900	Charles Henry Parmelee	Liberal
9th	1900–1904	Charles Henry Parmelee	Liberal
10th	1904–1908	Charles Henry Parmelee	Liberal
11th	1908–1911	Henry Edgarton Allen	Liberal
12th	1911–1917	Georges Henri Boivin	Liberal
13th	1917–1921	Georges Henri Boivin	Liberal
14th	1921–1925	Georges Henri Boivin	Liberal
15th	1925–1926	Georges Henri Boivin	Liberal
16th	1926–1930	Pierre-Ernest Boivin	Liberal
17th	1930–1935	J.-Eugène Tétreault	Conservative
18th	1935–1940	Joseph-Hermas Leclerc	Liberal
19th	1940–1945	Joseph-Hermas Leclerc	Liberal
20th	1945–1949	Marcel Boivin	Liberal
21st	1949–1953	Marcel Boivin	Liberal
22nd	1953–1957	Marcel Boivin	Liberal
23rd	1957–1958	Marcel Boivin	Liberal
24th	1958–1962	Marcel Boivin	Liberal
25th	1962–1963	Gilbert Rondeau	Social Credit
26th	1963–1963	Gilbert Rondeau	Social Credit
26th	1963–1965	Gilbert Rondeau	Ralliement créditiste
27th	1965–1968	Louis-Paul Neveu	Liberal
28th	1968–1971	Gilbert Rondeau	Ralliement créditiste
28th	1971–1972	Gilbert Rondeau	Social Credit
29th	1972–1974	Gilbert Rondeau	Social Credit
30th	1974–1977	Gilbert Rondeau	Social Credit
30th	1977–1979	Gilbert Rondeau	Independent
31st	1979–1980	Jean Lapierre	Liberal
32nd	1980–1984	Jean Lapierre	Liberal
33rd	1984–1988	Jean Lapierre	Liberal
34th	1988–1990	Jean Lapierre	Liberal
34th	1990–1993	Jean Lapierre	Bloc Québécois
35th	1993–1997	Jean Leroux	Bloc Québécois
36th	1997–2000	Diane St-Jacques	Progressive Conservative
37th	2000–2004	Diane St-Jacques	Liberal
38th	2004–2006	Robert Vincent	Bloc Québécois
39th	2006–2008	Robert Vincent	Bloc Québécois
40th	2008–2011	Robert Vincent	Bloc Québécois
41st	2011–2015	Réjean Genest	New Democratic
42nd	2015–2019	Pierre Breton	Liberal
43rd	2019–2021	Andréanne Larouche	Bloc Québécois
44th	2021–2025	Andréanne Larouche	Bloc Québécois
45th	2025–present	Andréanne Larouche	Bloc Québécois

== Election results ==
2025 Canadian federal election
Party	Candidate	Votes	%	±%	Expenditures
Bloc Québécois	Andréanne Larouche	26,726	40.11	−1.81	$50,306.60
Liberal	Felix Dionne	26,155	39.25	+5.76	$78,375.21
Conservative	James Seale	11,404	17.12	+4.99	$6,034.15
New Democratic	Patrick Jasmin	1,557	2.34	−2.98	$0.00
People's	Susanne Lefebvre	789	1.18	−2.30	$1,429.68
Total valid votes/expense limit		66,631	98.29	–	$141,844.00
Total rejected ballots		1,156	1.71		
Turnout		67,787	70.50		
Eligible voters		96,155			
Bloc Québécois hold		Swing		−3.79	
Source: Elections Canada
Note: number of eligible voters does not include voting day registrations.

2021 Canadian federal election
Party	Candidate	Votes	%	±%	Expenditures
Bloc Québécois	Andréanne Larouche	24,997	41.9	+3.3	$31,772.48
Liberal	Pierre Breton	19,968	33.5	-3.6	$84,958.35
Conservative	Céline Lalancette	7,234	12.1	-0.2	$6,814.84
New Democratic	Patrick Jasmin	3,173	5.3	-0.8	$1,243.21
People's	Gerda Scheider	2,073	3.5	+2.7	$2,379.78
Green	Mathieu Morin	1,059	1.8	-2.8	$0.00
Free	Joel Lacroix	599	1.0	N/A	$2,821.90
Marijuana	Yannick Brisebois	284	0.5	N/A	none listed
Indépendance du Québec	Jean-Philippe Beaudry-Graham	239	0.4	-0.1	$0.00
Total valid votes/expense limit		59,626	97.7	–	$121,523.31
Total rejected ballots		1,409	2.3		
Turnout		61,035	65.2		
Eligible voters		93,597			
Bloc Québécois hold		Swing		+3.5	
Source: Elections Canada

2019 Canadian federal election
Party	Candidate	Votes	%	±%	Expenditures
Bloc Québécois	Andréanne Larouche	23,503	38.58	+16.36	$6,576.43
Liberal	Pierre Breton	22,605	37.11	-1.85	none listed
Conservative	Nathalie Clermont	7,495	12.30	-0.47	$32,903.14
New Democratic	Raymonde Plamondon	3,705	6.08	-17.59	none listed
Green	Katherine Turgeon	2,814	4.62	+2.25	none listed
People's	Mariam Sabbagh	497	0.82		$0.00
Indépendance du Québec	Darlène Daviault	294	0.48		$0.00
Total valid votes/expense limit		60,913	97.89		
Total rejected ballots		1,313	2.11	-0.05	
Turnout		62,226	68.28	+0.26	
Eligible voters		91,138			
Bloc Québécois gain from Liberal		Swing		+9.11	
Source: Elections Canada

2015 Canadian federal election
Party	Candidate	Votes	%	±%	Expenditures
Liberal	Pierre Breton	22,957	38.96	+29.97	$38,440.56
New Democratic	Claire Mailhot	13,945	23.67	-27.42	$59,455.32
Bloc Québécois	Jocelyn Beaudoin	13,092	22.22	-1.15	$34,737.83
Conservative	Sylvie Fontaine	7,529	12.78	-1.87	$22,193.17
Green	Simon McMillan	1,397	2.37	+0.48	–
Total valid votes/expense limit		58,920	97.84		$228,694.19
Total rejected ballots		1,299	2.16	–	
Turnout		60,219	68.02	–	
Eligible voters		88,533			
Liberal gain from New Democratic		Swing		+28.69	
Source: Elections Canada

2011 federal election redistributed results
Party	Vote	%
New Democratic	27,578	51.09
Bloc Québécois	12,617	23.37
Conservative	7,908	14.65
Liberal	4,856	9.00
Green	1,022	1.89

2011 Canadian federal election
Party	Candidate	Votes	%	±%	Expenditures
New Democratic	Réjean Genest	27,575	51.09		$1,185
Bloc Québécois	Robert Vincent	12,615	23.37		$64,514
Conservative	Mélisa Leclerc	7,908	14.65		$53,500
Liberal	Bernard Demers	4,855	8.99	–	$9,662
Green	Frank Daoust	1,022	1.89	–	none listed
Total valid votes		53,975	100.00		
Total rejected ballots		877			
Turnout		54,852	64.79		
Electors on the lists		84,666			
Source: Official Voting Results, 41st General Election 2011, Elections Canada

2008 Canadian federal election
Party	Candidate	Votes	%	±%	Expenditures
Bloc Québécois	Robert Vincent	21,650	42.82		$53,957
Liberal	Bernard Demers	10,810	21.38	–	$22,487
Conservative	Jean Lambert	9,927	19.63		$38,653
New Democratic	Simon Gnocchini Messier	6,323	12.51		$7,035
Green	Michel M. Champagne	1,848	3.66	–	none listed
Total valid votes		50,558	100.00		
Total rejected ballots		994			
Turnout		51,552	63.14		
Electors on the lists		81,651			
Source: Official Voting Results, 40th General Election 2008, Elections Canada

2006 Canadian federal election
Party	Candidate	Votes	%	±%	Expenditures
Bloc Québécois	Robert Vincent	22,159	43.09		$46,245
Conservative	Jean Lambert	12,734	24.76		$19,667
Liberal	Diane St-Jacques	12,043	23.41	–	$53,682
New Democratic	Paula Maundcote	2,431	4.73		$1,540
Green	Francine Brière	2,061	4.01	–	none listed
Total valid votes		51,428	100.00		
Total rejected ballots		867			
Turnout		52,295	66.75		
Electors on the lists		78,345			
Source: Official Voting Results, 39th General Election 2006, Elections Canada

2004 Canadian federal election
Party	Candidate	Votes	%	±%	Expenditures
Bloc Québécois	Robert Vincent	21,968	46.60	+2.65	$41,344
Liberal	Diane St-Jacques	18,725	39.72	-6.21	$60,445
Conservative	Jacques Parenteau	3,732	7.92	+0.45 (Note: Conservative vote is compared to the total of the Canadian Alliance vote and Progressive Conservative vote in the 2000 election.)	$6,910
Green	Francine Brière	1,571	3.33	–	
New Democratic	Sonia Bisson	1,146	2.43	+1.59	$400
Total valid votes/expense limit		47,146	100.00	$77,209	

2000 Canadian federal election
Party	Candidate	Votes	%	±%
Liberal	Diane St-Jacques	20,707	45.93	+19.74
Bloc Québécois	Michel Benoit	19,816	43.95	+8.13
Alliance	Jean-Jacques Treyvaud	1,867	4.14	
Progressive Conservative	Audrey Castonguay	1,498	3.32	-33.58
Marijuana	Nicolas Cousineau	819	1.82	
New Democratic	Elizabeth Morey	380	0.84	-0.25
Total valid votes		45,087	100.00	

1997 Canadian federal election
Party	Candidate	Votes	%	±%
Progressive Conservative	Diane St-Jacques	17,897	36.90	+25.10
Bloc Québécois	Jean H. Leroux	17,376	35.82	-19.60
Liberal	Chantal Gareau	12,699	26.18	-2.87
New Democratic	Karen Hurley	531	1.09	-0.11
Total valid votes		48,503	100.00	

1993 Canadian federal election
Party	Candidate	Votes	%	±%
Bloc Québécois	Jean Leroux	27,001	55.42	
Liberal	Roger Légaré	14,152	29.05	-19.19
Progressive Conservative	Jocelyn Compagnat	5,750	11.80	-31.41
Natural Law	Michèle Beausoleil	758	1.56	
New Democratic	Marielle Sanna	586	1.20	-7.34
Abolitionist	Denis Loubier	470	0.96	
Total valid votes		48,717	100.00	

1988 Canadian federal election
Party	Candidate	Votes	%	±%
Liberal	Jean Lapierre	23,943	48.24	+0.73
Progressive Conservative	Danielle Coté	21,445	43.21	+0.27
New Democratic	Paul Pearson	4,242	8.55	+1.89
Total valid votes		49,630	100.00	

1984 Canadian federal election
Party	Candidate	Votes	%	±%
Liberal	Jean Lapierre	25,483	47.51	-20.96
Progressive Conservative	Denis Loubier	23,028	42.94	+22.18
New Democratic	Denis Boissé	3,569	6.65	-1.16
Parti nationaliste	Pierre C. Boivin	1,552	2.89	
Total valid votes		53,632	100.00	

1980 Canadian federal election
Party	Candidate	Votes	%	±%
Liberal	Jean Lapierre	32,449	68.47	+17.00
Progressive Conservative	Armand Russell	9,837	20.76	-2.79
New Democratic	Denis Boissé	3,701	7.81	+5.76
Rhinoceros	Cornélius André Brazeau	1,274	2.69	+1.12
Marxist–Leninist	Gilles Davignon	129	0.27	
Total valid votes		47,390	100.00	

1979 Canadian federal election
Party	Candidate	Votes	%	±%
Liberal	Jean Lapierre	25,287	51.47	+12.13
Progressive Conservative	Gérald R. Scott	11,567	23.54	+6.93
Independent	Gilbert Rondeau	6,454	13.14	
Social Credit	Murielle Audette	3,922	7.98	-33.64
New Democratic	Denis Boisse	1,008	2.05	-0.37
Rhinoceros	Lyse Dumouchel	770	1.57	
Union populaire	Gilles Maille	121	0.25	
Total valid votes		49,129	100.00	

1974 Canadian federal election
Party	Candidate	Votes	%	±%
Social Credit	Gilbert Rondeau	15,512	41.62	-6.91
Liberal	Louis-Paul Neveu	14,663	39.34	+5.97
Progressive Conservative	Louis Grignon	6,193	16.62	+0.54
New Democratic	Terry Haig	903	2.42	+0.39
Total valid votes		37,271	100.00	

1972 Canadian federal election
Party	Candidate	Votes	%	±%
Social Credit	Gilbert Rondeau	18,803	48.53	+7.89 (Note: Social Credit vote is compared to Ralliement créditiste vote in the 1968 election.)
Liberal	Louis-Paul Neveu	12,928	33.37	-5.75
Progressive Conservative	Guy Arseneault	6,228	16.07	-2.32
New Democratic	John Philip Penner	786	2.03	+0.18
Total valid votes		38,745	100.00	

1968 Canadian federal election
Party	Candidate	Votes	%	±%
Ralliement créditiste	Gilbert Rondeau	12,633	40.64	+7.98
Liberal	Louis-Paul Neveu	12,158	39.11	+6.29
Progressive Conservative	Paul-O. Trépanier	5,718	18.40	-14.33
New Democratic	Jean Miller	574	1.85	
Total valid votes		31,083	100.00	

1965 Canadian federal election
Party	Candidate	Votes	%	±%
Liberal	Louis-Paul Neveu	9,494	32.82	-3.97
Progressive Conservative	Paul-O. Trépanier	9,467	32.73	+13.82
Ralliement créditiste	Gilbert Rondeau	9,447	32.66	-5.18 (Note: Ralliement créditiste vote is compared to Social Credit vote in the 1963 election.)
Independent Liberal	Lucien Pearson	518	1.79	
Total valid votes		28,926	100.00	

1963 Canadian federal election
Party	Candidate	Votes	%	±%
Social Credit	Gilbert Rondeau	9,989	37.84	-4.18
Liberal	Gérard Lacaille	9,713	36.79	+4.42
Progressive Conservative	Donat Marois	4,991	18.91	-6.70
New Democratic	Jacques Jourdenais	1,706	6.46	
Total valid votes		26,399	100.00	

1962 Canadian federal election
Party	Candidate	Votes	%	±%
Social Credit	Gilbert Rondeau	12,421	42.02	
Liberal	Marcel Boivin	9,570	32.37	-17.72
Progressive Conservative	Claude Léveillé	7,569	25.61	-21.45
Total valid votes		29,560	100.00	

1958 Canadian federal election
Party	Candidate	Votes	%	±%
Liberal	Marcel Boivin	13,001	50.10	-12.87
Progressive Conservative	Jacques Hannon	12,211	47.05	+10.02
Co-operative Commonwealth	Adrien Dumas	739	2.85	
Total valid votes		25,951	100.00	

1957 Canadian federal election
Party	Candidate	Votes	%	±%
Liberal	Marcel Boivin	14,897	62.97	-5.13
Progressive Conservative	Hector Choquette	8,760	37.03	+5.13
Total valid votes		23,657	100.00	

1953 Canadian federal election
Party	Candidate	Votes	%	±%
Liberal	Marcel Boivin	15,409	68.10	+8.81
Progressive Conservative	Jean-Louis Robert	7,219	31.90	-4.68
Total valid votes		22,628	100.00	

1949 Canadian federal election
Party	Candidate	Votes	%	±%
Liberal	Marcel Boivin	12,993	59.29	+11.92
Progressive Conservative	Wilson Irwin	8,017	36.58	
Union des électeurs	Fernand Brodeur	906	4.13	0.44
Total valid votes		21,916	100.00	

1945 Canadian federal election
Party	Candidate	Votes	%	±%
Liberal	Marcel Boivin	7,413	47.37	-20.87
Bloc populaire	Lindor Tétreault	4,212	26.92	
Independent PC	Patrick Edward Delaney	3,446	22.02	
Social Credit	Elzéar Brodeur	578	3.69	
Total valid votes		15,649	100.00	

1940 Canadian federal election
Party	Candidate	Votes	%	±%
Liberal	Joseph-Hermas Leclerc	7,831	68.24	+16.67
National Government	Hector Choquette	3,644	31.76	-16.67 (Note: National Government vote is compared to the Conservative vote in the 1935 election.)
Total valid votes		11,475	100.00	

1935 Canadian federal election
Party	Candidate	Votes	%	±%
Liberal	Joseph-Hermas Leclerc	6,925	51.58	+7.90
Conservative	Sylva Lebrun	6,502	48.42	-7.90
Total valid votes		13,427	100.00	

1930 Canadian federal election
Party	Candidate	Votes	%	±%
Conservative	J.-Eugène Tétreault	7,064	56.32	+20.20
Liberal	Pierre-Ernest Boivin	5,478	43.68	-20.20
Total valid votes		12,542	100.00	

1926 Canadian federal election
Party	Candidate	Votes	%	±%
Liberal	Pierre-Ernest Boivin	6,374	63.87	+7.10
Conservative	Louis-Joseph Gauthier	3,605	36.13	-7.10
Total valid votes		9,979	100.00	

1925 Canadian federal election
Party	Candidate	Votes	%	±%
Liberal	Georges Henri Boivin	5,910	56.78	-13.78
Conservative	James Davidson	4,499	43.22	
Total valid votes		10,409	100.00	

1921 Canadian federal election
Party	Candidate	Votes	%
Liberal	Georges Henri Boivin	6,318	70.56
Independent	Hormisdas Beaudry	2,636	29.44
Total valid votes		8,954	100.00

1917 Canadian federal election
Party	Candidate	Votes
Opposition (Laurier Liberals)	Georges Henri Boivin	acclaimed

1911 Canadian federal election
Party	Candidate	Votes	%	±%
Liberal	Georges Henri Boivin	2,271	50.29	-3.03
Conservative	James Davidson	2,245	49.71	+3.03
Total valid votes		4,516	100.00	

1908 Canadian federal election
Party	Candidate	Votes	%	±%
Liberal	Henry Edgarton Allen	2,465	53.32	-4.25
Conservative	William H. Robinson	2,158	46.68	+4.25
Total valid votes		4,623	100.00	

1904 Canadian federal election
Party	Candidate	Votes	%	±%
Liberal	Charles Henry Parmelee	2,347	57.57	+2.45
Conservative	Peter Munroe Hayes	1,730	42.43	-2.45
Total valid votes		4,077	100.00	

1900 Canadian federal election
Party	Candidate	Votes	%	±%
Liberal	Charles Henry Parmelee	2,314	55.12	-0.81
Conservative	Alonzo Chown Savage	1,884	44.88	+0.81
Total valid votes		4,198	100.00	

1896 Canadian federal election
Party	Candidate	Votes	%	±%
Liberal	Charles Henry Parmelee	2,191	55.94	+3.34
Conservative	P.J.I. Peltier	1,726	44.06	-3.34
Total valid votes		3,917	100.00	

1891 Canadian federal election
Party	Candidate	Votes	%	±%
Liberal	J. R. Sanborn	1,792	52.60	
Conservative	A.C. Savage	1,615	47.40	-3.07
Total valid votes		3,407	100.00	

1887 Canadian federal election
Party	Candidate	Votes	%	±%
Conservative	Antoine Audet	1,671	50.47	
Independent Liberal	M. Auger	1,640	49.53	-2.70
Total valid votes		3,311	100.00	

1882 Canadian federal election
Party	Candidate	Votes	%	±%
Independent Liberal	Michel Auger	1,581	52.23	+42.76
Liberal	Lucius Seth Huntington	1,446	47.77	-1.46
Total valid votes		3,027	100.00	

1878 Canadian federal election
Party	Candidate	Votes	%	±%
Liberal	Lucius Seth Huntington	1,414	49.23	+7.23
Unknown	R. Nicol	1,186	41.30	
Unknown	M. Auger	272	9.47	
Total valid votes		2,872	100.00	

1874 Canadian federal election
Party	Candidate	Votes	±%	
Liberal	Lucius Seth Huntington	1,618	57.99	+1.12
Unknown	J.J. Curran	1,172	42.01	
Total valid votes		2,790	100.00	

1872 Canadian federal election
Party	Candidate	Votes	%	±%
Liberal	Lucius Seth Huntington	1,515	56.87	-0.19
Unknown	Charles Thibault	1,149	43.13	
Total valid votes		2,664	100.00	
Source: Canadian Elections Database

1867 Canadian federal election
Party	Candidate	Votes	%
Liberal	Lucius Seth Huntington	1,317	57.06
Unknown	Parmelee	991	42.94
Total valid votes		2,308	100.00
Source: Canadian Elections Database

== See also ==
- List of Canadian electoral districts
- Historical federal electoral districts of Canada
