= John Robbins Sanborn =

Canadian politician

John Robbins Sanborn (1839 – January 13, 1914) was a farmer and political figure in Quebec. He represented Shefford from 1891 to 1896 as a Liberal member.

He was born in South Roxton, Lower Canada, the son of A. Sanborn who came to Lower Canada from New Hampshire, and was educated in Granby. He married Malvina Blampin. Sanborn served on the council for South Roxton. He was also a school commissioner, president of the Agricultural Society, vice-president of the Dairy Association and a director of the Fruit Grower's Association.

== Electoral record ==
1891 Canadian federal election: Shefford
Party	Candidate	Votes	%	±%
Liberal	J. R. Sanborn	1,792	52.60	
Conservative	A.C. Savage	1,615	47.40	-3.07
Total valid votes		3,407	100.00	

Parliament of Canada
Preceded by Antoine Audet	Member of Parliament for Shefford; 1891–1896	Succeeded by Charles Henry Parmelee
