= Antoine Audet =

Canadian politician

Member of Parliament for Shefford
- In office 1887–1891
- Preceded by: Michel Auger
- Succeeded by: John Robbins Sanborn

Personal details
- Born: December 8, 1846 Boucherville, Canada East
- Died: June 14, 1915 (aged 68)
- Party: Conservative
- Profession: Farmer, postmaster

Antoine Audet (December 8, 1846 – June 14, 1915) was a Canadian politician and farmer. He was elected to the House of Commons of Canada in 1887 as a Member of the historical Conservative Party to represent the riding of Shefford. He did not stand for the next election.

In 1857, he married Louise Couture. Audet was postmaster for North Stukely in Shefford County.

1887 Canadian federal election: Shefford
Party	Candidate	Votes	%	±%
Conservative	Antoine Audet	1,671	50.47	
Independent Liberal	M. Auger	1,640	49.53	-2.70
Total valid votes		3,311	100.00	
