= Hector Choquette =

Canadian politician (1884–1959)

Member of the Legislative Assembly of Quebec for Shefford
- In office 1935–1939
- Preceded by: Robert-Raoul Bachand
- Succeeded by: Charles Munson Bullock
- In office 1944–1952
- Preceded by: Charles Munson Bullock
- Succeeded by: Gaston Ledoux

Personal details
- Born: October 3, 1884 Saint-Alphonse, near Granby, Quebec
- Died: May 8, 1959 (aged 74) Montreal, Quebec
- Party: Action libérale nationale Union Nationale

Hector Choquette (October 3, 1884 – May 8, 1959) was a Canadian politician and Member of the Legislative Assembly of Quebec (MLA).

== Early life ==
He was born on October 3, 1884, near Granby, Estrie and became a farmer.

== Member of the legislature ==
He ran as an Action libérale nationale candidate in the district of Shefford in the 1935 provincial election and won. Choquette joined Maurice Duplessis's Union Nationale and was re-elected in the 1936 election. He was defeated by Liberal candidate Charles Munson Bullock in the 1939 election.

== Political comeback ==
Choquette was re-elected in the 1944 and 1948 elections. He lost his bid for re-election in the 1952 elections and was succeeded by Liberal candidate Gaston Ledoux.

== Federal politics ==
Choquette unsuccessfully ran as a Progressive Conservative candidate in the federal district of Shefford in the 1957 federal election.

== Death ==
He died on May 8, 1959, in Montreal.
