= Mégantic =

Mégantic can refer to:

- Lac-Mégantic, Quebec, a municipality in southeastern Quebec formerly called Mégantic
- Lac-Mégantic derailment, a train derailment that occurred 6 July 2013
- Lake Mégantic, a lake in southeastern Quebec
- Mont Mégantic, a mountain in southeastern Quebec
- Mont Mégantic Observatory, an observatory located at Mont Megantic, Quebec
- Mont-Mégantic National Park, a Quebec provincial park surrounding Mount Megantic
- 4843 Mégantic, the asteroid Mégantic, 4843th registered, named after the Mont Mégantic Observatory
- SS Megantic (1908), a White Star Lines passenger ship named for Lake Mégantic, Québec

== Canadian federal electoral districts ==
- Mégantic—L'Érable—Lotbinière, a Canadian federal electoral district
- Mégantic (federal electoral district), a former Canadian federal electoral district
- Frontenac—Mégantic, a former Canadian federal electoral district
- Mégantic—Frontenac, a former Canadian federal electoral district

== Quebec provincial electoral districts ==
- Mégantic (provincial electoral district), a Quebec provincial electoral district
- Mégantic-Compton, a former Quebec provincial electoral district

== See also ==
- Notre Dame and Mégantic Mountains, a physiographic province of the larger Appalachian division
- Megantic outlaw, the folk hero Donald Morrison, an outlaw
- Lac Megantic (disambiguation)
