= Compton County, Quebec =

Historical county in Quebec, Canada

Coordinates: 45°20′N 71°30′W

Compton County is an historical county in southeastern Quebec, Canada, on the western flanks of the Appalachian Mountains on the Canada–United States border. It is in the Estrie (Eastern Townships) region of the province and was named in 1793 after a town in Surrey, England, by British officers who were convinced of the agricultural potential of the area. The county seat is Cookshire. Mount Megantic (altitude 1111 m) has an observatory operated by the Université de Montréal at its peak, which is accessible only from an adjacent county. In the early 1980s the County was dissolved, most of it becoming part of the MRC de Le Haut-Saint-François except for the southern portion which went to MRC de Coaticook.
