= Notre-Dame-des-Bois =

- Municipality
- Church of Notre-Dame-des-Bois
- Motto: Plus près des étoiles ("Closer to the stars")
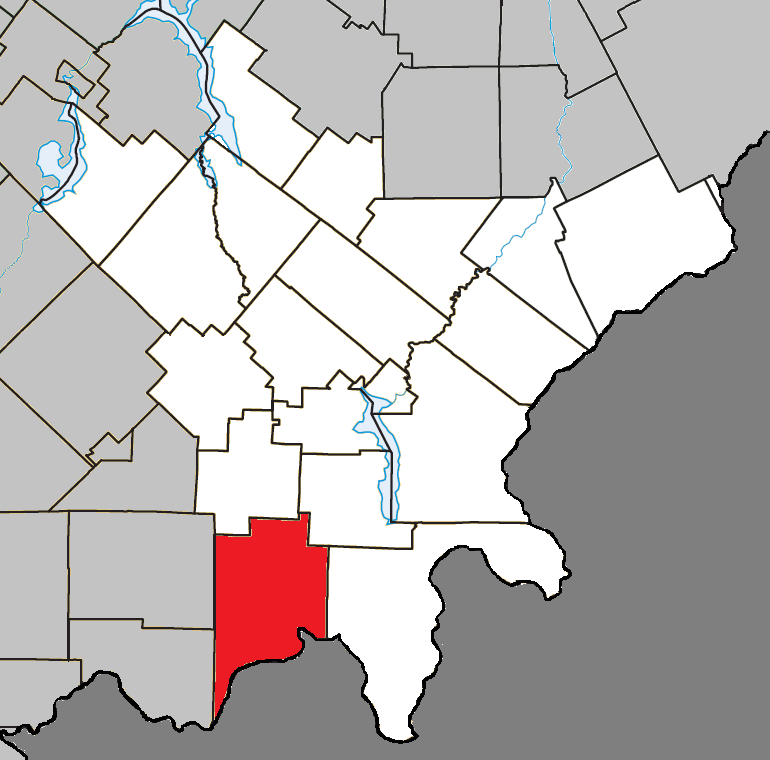
- Location within Le Granit RCM

- Location in southern Quebec
- Coordinates: 45°24′N 71°04′W
- Country: Canada
- Province: Quebec
- Region: Estrie
- RCM: Le Granit
- Constituted: January 1, 1877

Government
  - Mayor: Roger Goyette
  - Federal riding: Mégantic—L'Érable—Lotbinière
  - Prov. riding: Mégantic

Area
  - Total: 192.10 km^{2} (74.17 sq mi)
  - Land: 192.51 km^{2} (74.33 sq mi)
- There is an apparent contradiction between to authoritative sources

Population (2021)
  - Total: 1,028
  - Density: 5.3/km^{2} (14/sq mi)
  - Pop 2016-2021: ▲9.6%
  - Dwellings: 817
- Time zone: UTC−5 (EST)
  - Summer (DST): UTC−4 (EDT)
- Postal code(s): J0B 2E0
- Area code: 819
- Highways: R-212
- Website: www.notredamedesbois.qc.ca

Notre-Dame-des-Bois (French pronunciation: [nɔtʁə dam de bwa]) is a municipality in Le Granit Regional County Municipality in the Estrie region of Quebec, Canada, on the Canada–United States border. The population was 1,028 as of the Canada 2021 Census.

Located in the Appalachians, it lies at 555 metres in altitude, making it one of the highest towns in Quebec. Mont-Mégantic National Park is located in Notre-Dame-des-Bois and is one of the biggest tourism draws to the region.

== History ==
The municipality was created in 1876 when Ditton-Chesham-et-Clinton was split in two distinct municipality: Ditton-et-Clinton and Chesham. In 1958, Chesham changed its name to Notre-Dame-des-Bois.

== Attractions ==
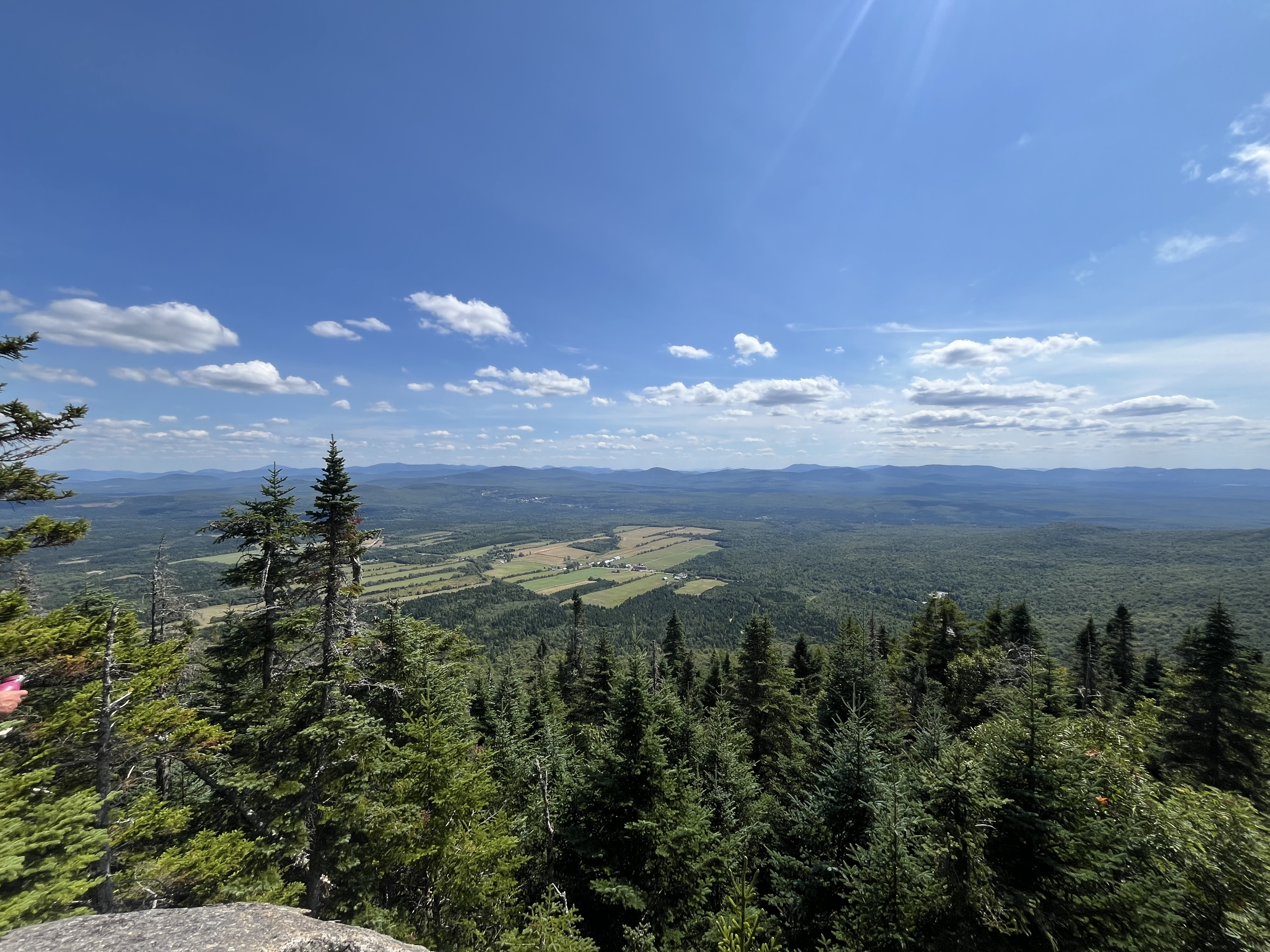
Notre-Dame-des-Bois and surrounding farmland viewed from Mont Mégantic National Park

The Mont-Mégantic National Park is located in this municipality. On top of Mont Mégantic is located Mont Mégantic Observatory which houses the second largest telescope in Eastern Canada.

== Sources ==
- Commission de toponymie du Québec
- Ministère des Affaires municipales, des Régions et de l'Occupation du territoire
