= LaPatrie (guitar) =

Line of classical guitars by the Godin guitar company

La Patrie is a line of classical guitars produced by the Godin guitar company. The La Patrie series of classical guitars consists of eight models including: Motif, Etude, Presentation, Concert, Concert CW (cutaway), Arena, Arena CW, Collection, Hybrid Light Burst, and the Hybrid Black.

== History ==
The guitar line originated from a small luthier shop founded in 1982 in the village of La Patrie, Quebec, Canada. In 1996, the first demo of collection model was available for purchase in some of the biggest guitar stores in Montreal, Quebec. In 2008, La Patrie won an acoustic guitar players' choice award.

Today there are over 200 people in La Patrie dedicated to the art of hand crafting guitars.
