= Seagull (company) =

Canadian musical instrument company

Seagull Guitars
- Company type: Private
- Industry: Musical instrument
- Founded: 1982; 44 years ago
- Founder: Robert Godin
- Headquarters: Montreal, Canada
- Area served: Worldwide
- Key people: Robert Godin
- Products: Acoustic guitars, mandolins, ukuleles
- Number of employees: 1,000+
- Parent: Godin Guitars
- Website: seagullguitars.com

Seagull is a Canadian company and sub-brand of Godin Guitars that produces acoustic guitars, mandolins, and ukuleles. The company was originally located in La Patrie, a small village in the Eastern Townships of Quebec, and founded in 1982 by Robert Godin and a few of his friends.

== Guitar architecture ==
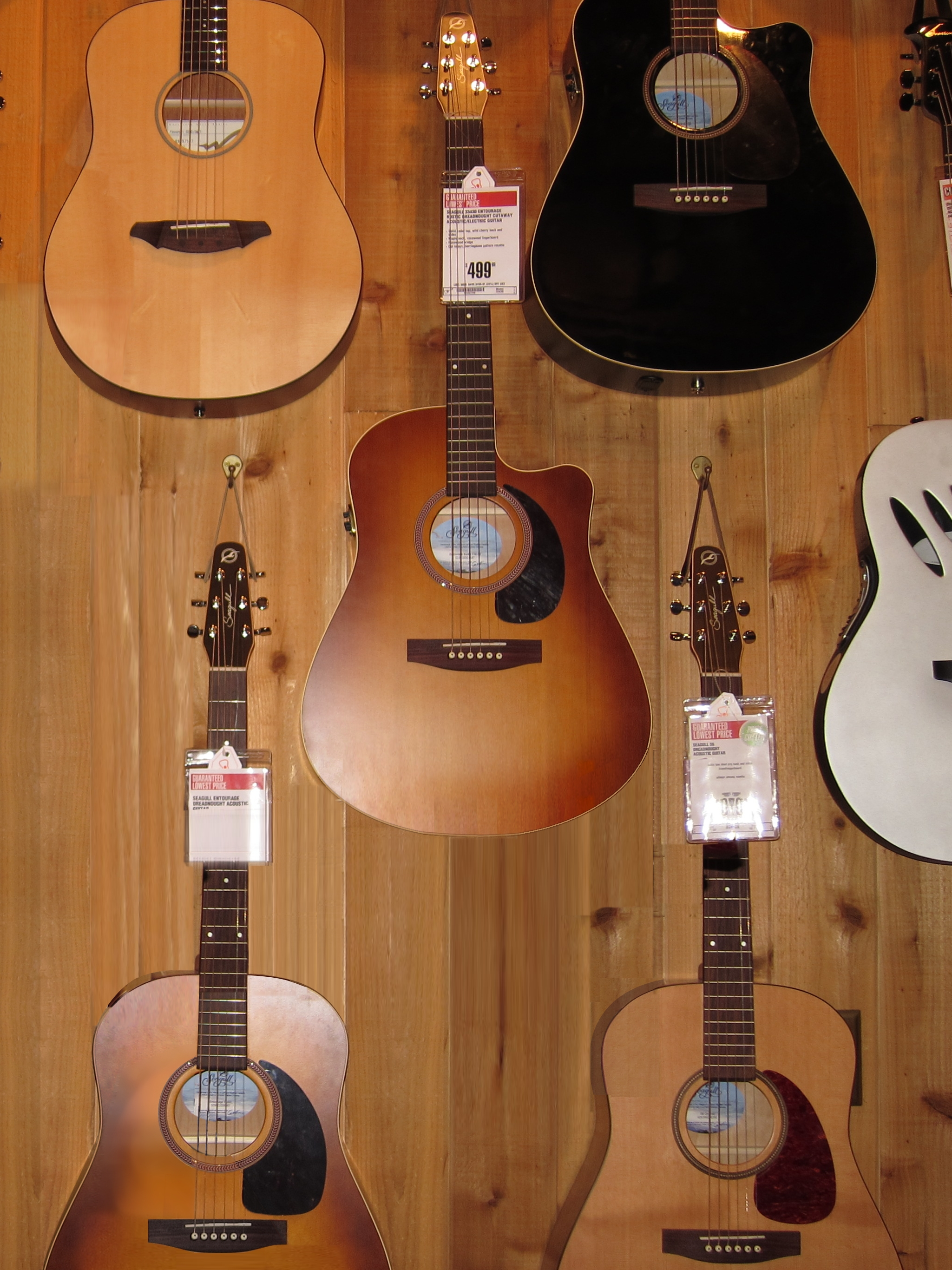
Several Seagull guitars on display

Seagull guitars feature a headstock which places the tuning machines roughly in line with the nut to improve tuning stability. Most models are available with either the Godin Quantum I electronics (featuring an under saddle transducer) or the Godin Quantum II electronics (with both a transducer and small microphone which can be blended together).

Seagull Guitars have also released a "compound-curve" top design on all of their lines. This adds an arch to the top of the guitar to allow for a thinner and a more lightly braced top. This is opposed to the typical flat top of an acoustic guitar which has problems with the sound hole sinking in. As part of the new design, the top has a slight (7 meter radius) curve slightly above the soundhole which then levels out around the bridge of the guitar. This provides stability while maintaining a traditional sound.

As Robert Godin, owner of Godin guitars, put it: “Our motivation for this project was to create a new acoustic design that would simultaneously improve sound and structural integrity. As a general rule better sound comes with more delicate construction. Conversely, stronger construction, such as thicker tops and heavier bracing, stifles the sound.”

== Notable players ==
- Michalis Hatzigiannis - Greek singer, plays a Seagull Performer Mini-Jumbo QI
- Peppino D'Agostino - Italian acoustic guitarist, plays a Seagull Artist Series Peppino D’Agostino CW model
- James Blunt - UK singer and songwriter, plays a Seagull S6 Original
- Emm Gryner - Canadian singer and songwriter, plays a Seagull Folk S6 Original
- Michelle Lambert - American singer and songwriter, plays a Seagull Artist Studio CW
- Kim Deal - American musician
- Sufjan Stevens - American musician
