= Beaver dam =

Dam constructed by beavers

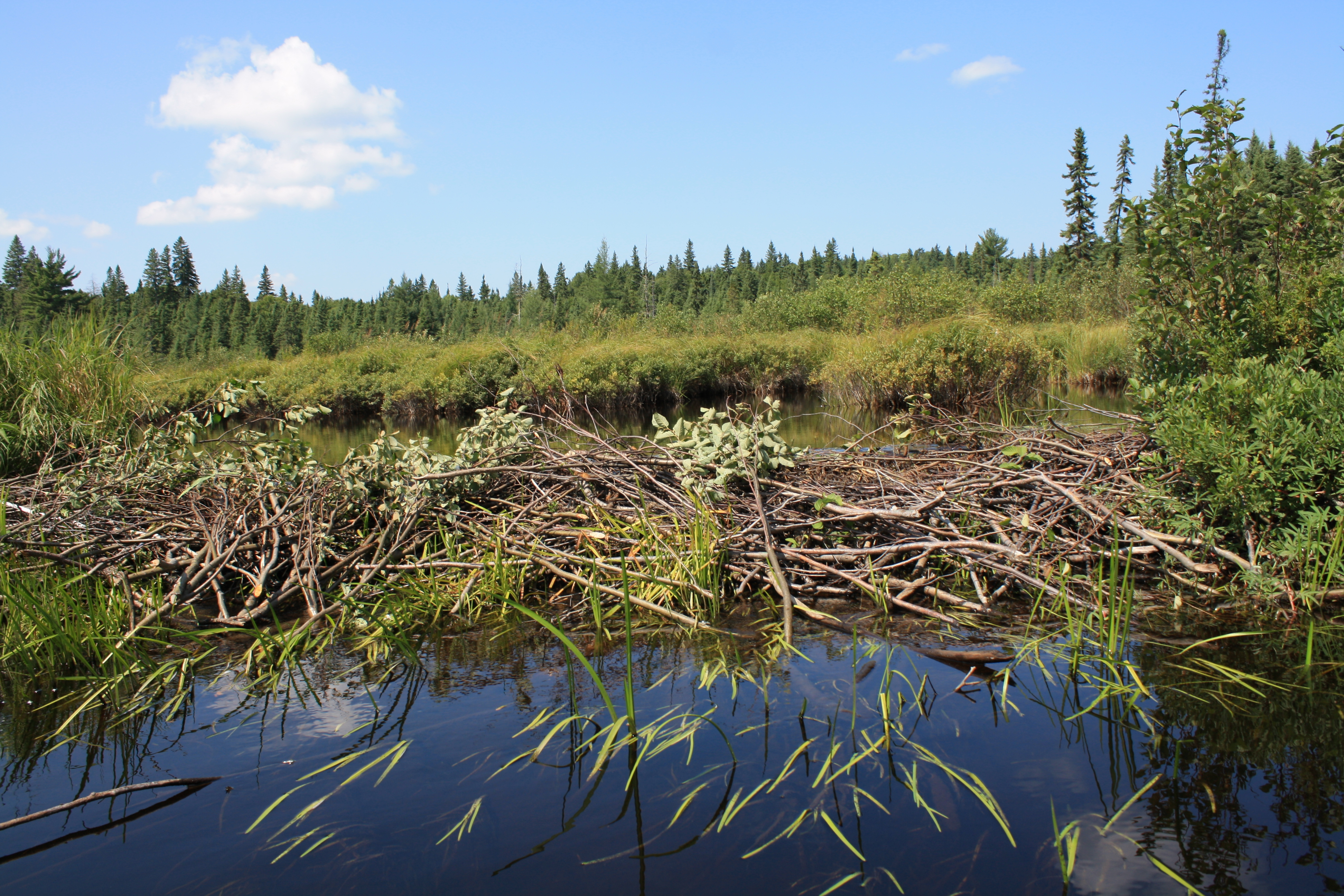
Beaver dam at Algonquin Park in Ontario, Canada

A beaver dam, or beaver impoundment, is a dam built by beavers; it creates a pond which protects against predators and holds food during winter. Beavers build prolifically at night, carrying mud with their forepaws and timber between their teeth. Dams include other wild materials also found in the region, such as rocks and other organic materials.

These structures modify the natural environment in such a way that the overall ecosystem builds upon the change, making beavers a keystone species and ecosystem engineers. In native regions, these dams reduce downstream flooding, clean water, help restore and maintain wetlands and provide important firebreaks in fire-prone regions. Abandoned damns gradually silt over and decompose, leaving rich soil that gradually becomes other ecological niches.

Inspired by the positive effects on the environment, humans build beaver dam analogues (BDAs), which can provide similar ecosystem services, deliberately deployed for water retention in the landscape and the construction of ponds as wetland and breeding ground for other species. Beaver's impoundments can be disruptive in human-managed landscapes, such as farmland or near roads or homes. When introduced non-natively, they can be severely damaging to natural ecosystems, such as in Southern Patagonia.

== Construction ==
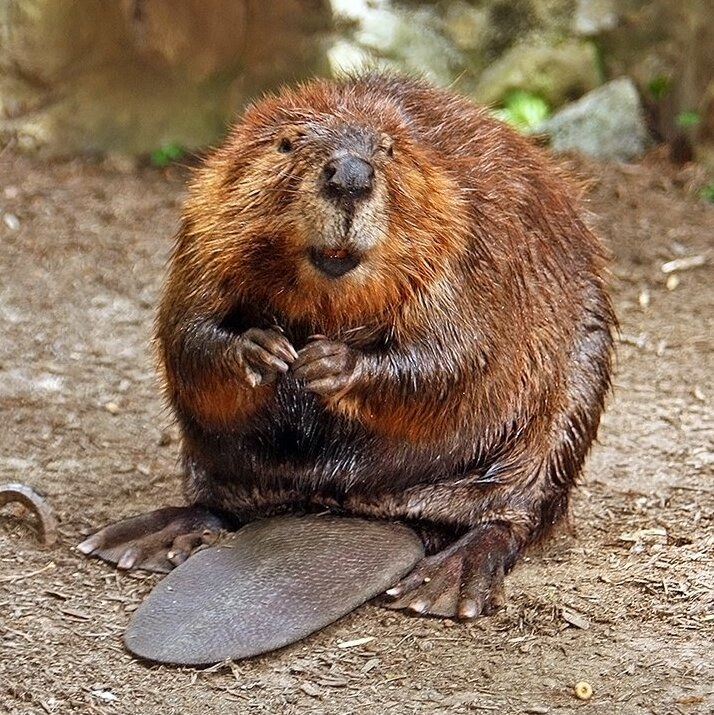
North American beaver (Castor canadensis), one of two species of beaver

A minimum water level of 0.6 to 0.9 metres (2 ft 0 in to 2 ft 11 in) is required to keep the underwater entrance to beaver lodges from being blocked by ice during the winter. In lakes, rivers and large streams with deep enough water, beavers may not build dams, instead living in bank burrows and lodges.

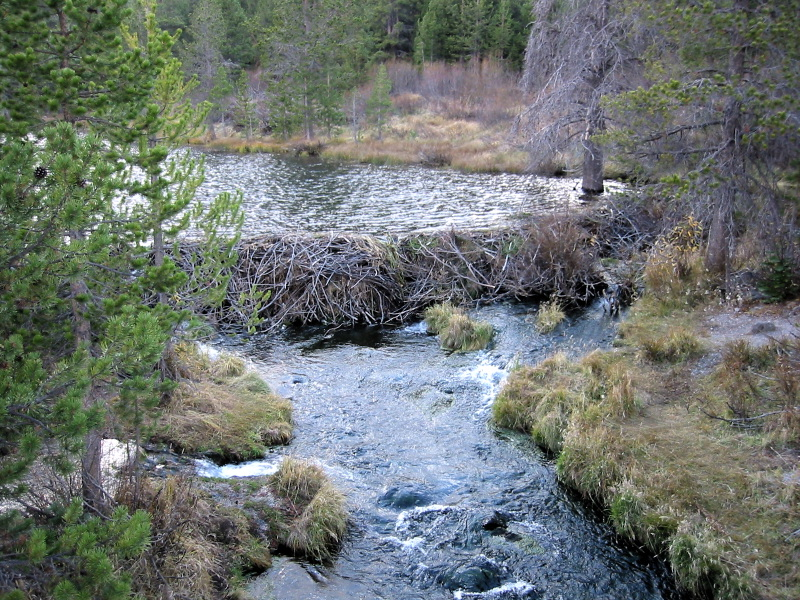
Beaver dam in Lassen Volcanic National Park

Beavers start construction by diverting the stream to lessen the water's flow pressure. Branches and logs are then driven into the mud of the stream bed to form a base. Then sticks, bark (from deciduous trees), rocks, mud, grass, leaves, masses of plants, and anything else available are used to build the superstructure. Beavers can transport their own weight in material; they drag logs along mudslides and float them through canals to get them in place. Once the dam has flooded enough area to the proper depth to form a protective moat for the lodge (often covering many acres), beavers begin construction of the lodge.

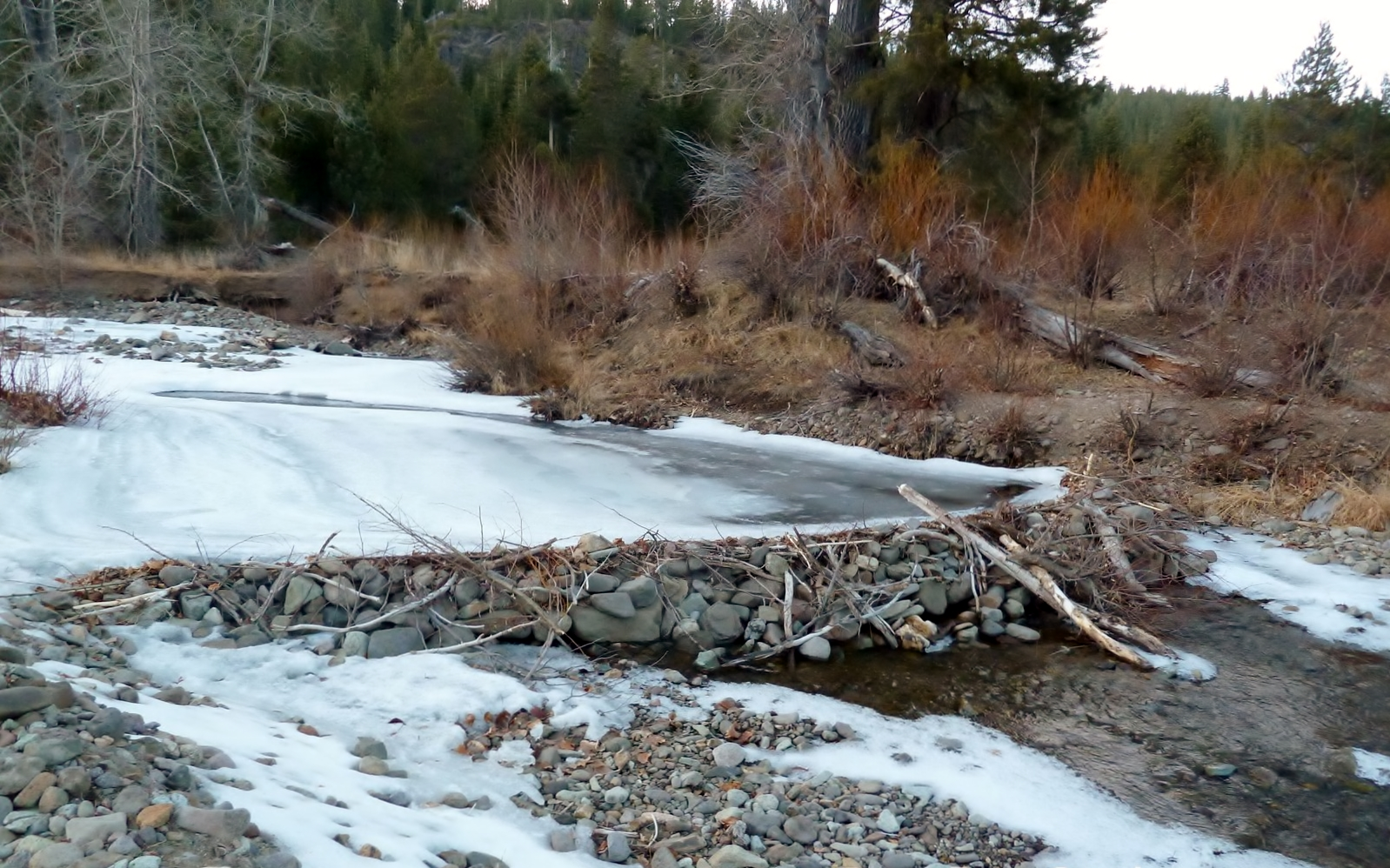
Beavers use rocks for their dams when mud and branches are less available, as seen on Bear Creek, a tributary to the Truckee River, in Alpine Meadows, California.

Trees approaching a diameter of 90 centimetres (2 ft 11 in) may be used to construct a dam, although the average is 10 to 30 centimetres (3.9 in to 11.8 in). Log length depends on the diameter of the tree and the size of the beaver. There are recorded cases of beavers felling trees of 45 metres (147 ft 8 in) tall and 115 centimetres (3 ft 9 in) in diameter. Logs of this size are not intended to be used as structural members of the dam; rather, the bark is used for food, and sometimes to get to upper branches. It takes a beaver about 20 minutes to cut down a 15-centimetre (5.9 in) wide aspen, by gnawing a groove around the trunk in an hourglass shape. A beaver's jaws are powerful enough to cut a 1.5-centimetre (0.59 in) sapling in one bite.

Beavers are most active in maintaining their dams in the fall and spring in colder climates, while in ice-free climates, they may maintain their dams throughout the year, albeit with reduced activity during the summer. A study in Poland found that beavers could rebuild a destroyed dam and restore water levels in approximately 8 hours.

If beavers are considered central place foragers, their canals may be considered an extension of their "central place" far beyond the lodge, according to a 2004–2012 study that mapped beaver ponds and cut stumps.

It has been suggested that by building dams, beavers are expressing tool use behaviour.

=== Size ===
Beaver dams typically range in length from a few meters to about 100 metres (328 ft 1 in). Canals can be over 500 metres (1,640 ft 5 in) long. The largest known beaver dam is in Wood Buffalo National Park in Alberta, Canada, and is 775 metres (2,542 ft 8 in) long. Satellite photos provided by NASA WorldWind show the dam did not exist in 1975, but it appeared in subsequent images. It has two or more lodges and is a combination of two original dams. Google Earth images show new dams being built which could ultimately join the main dam and increase the overall length by another 50 to 100 metres (164 ft 1 in to 328 ft 1 in) during the next decade. Coordinates: 58°16′15″N 112°15′6″W.

Another large beaver dam measuring 652 metres (2,139 ft) long, 4.3 metres (14 ft) high and 7.0 metres (23 ft) thick at the base was found in Three Forks, Montana.

== Effects ==
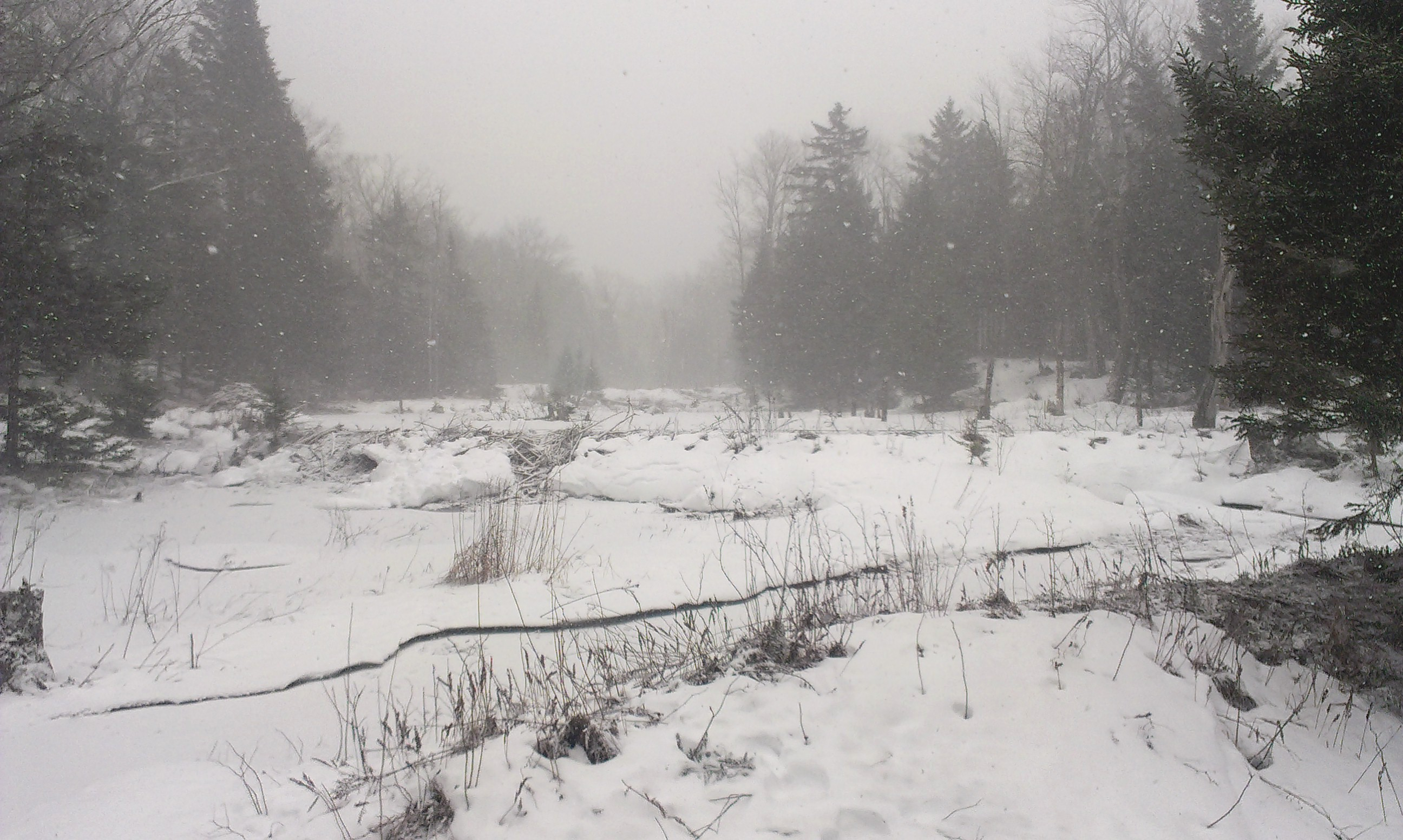
Beaver dam in winter in Mont Mégantic

Dam building can help to restore damaged wetlands. Wetland benefits include flood control downstream, biodiversity (by providing habitat for different species), and water cleansing, both by the breakdown of toxins such as pesticides and the retention of silt by beaver dams. Beaver dams reduce erosion and decrease the turbidity that can be a limiting factor for some aquatic life. The benefits may be long-term and largely unnoticed unless a catchment is monitored closely. Almost half of endangered and threatened species in North America rely upon wetlands.

In 2012, a systematic review was conducted on the impacts of beaver dams on fishes and fish habitat (biased to North America (88%)). The most frequently cited benefits of beaver dams were increased habitat heterogeneity, rearing and overwintering habitat, flow refuge, and invertebrate production. Impeded fish movement because of dams, siltation of spawning habitat and low oxygen levels in ponds were the most often cited negative impacts. Benefits (184) were cited more frequently than costs (119).

=== Flood control ===
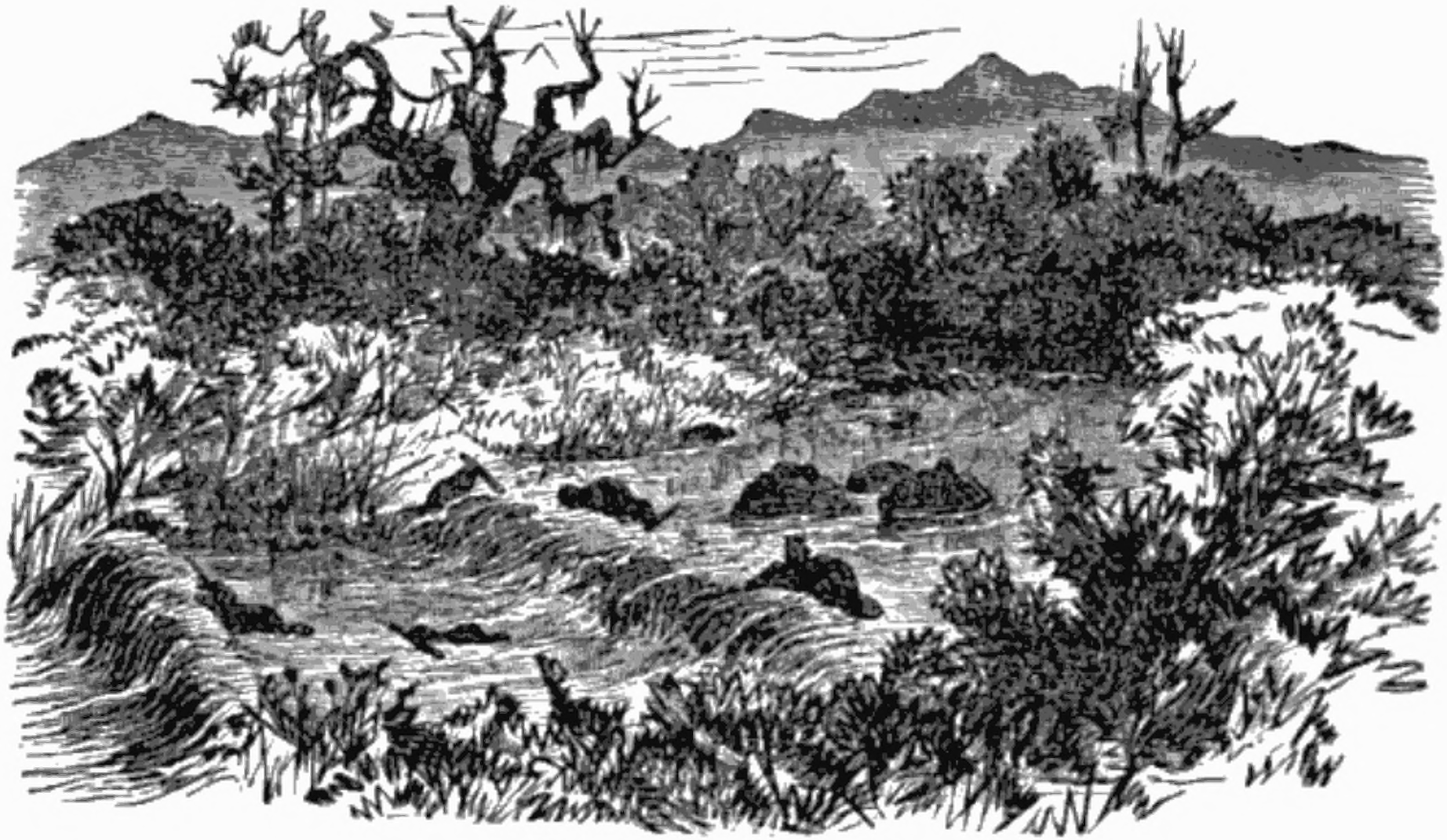
Beaver dam as depicted in Frances Fuller Victor's 1887 book Eleven Years in the Rocky Mountains and a Life on the Frontier.

A beaver dam may have a freeboard above the water level. When heavy rains occur, the river or lake fills up. Afterward the dam gradually releases the extra stored water, thus somewhat reducing the height of the flood wave moving down the river.

The surface of any stream intersects the surrounding water table. By raising the stream level, the gradient of the surface of the water table above the beaver dam is reduced, and water near the beaver dam flows more slowly into the stream. This may also help in reducing flood waves, and increasing water flow when there is no rain. In other words, beaver dams smooth out water flow by increasing the area wetted by the stream. This allows more water to seep into the ground where its flow is slowed. This water eventually finds its way back to the stream. Rivers with beaver dams in their head waters have lower high water and higher low water levels.

By raising the water table in wetlands such as peatlands, they can stabilize a fluctuating water table, which influences the levels of both carbon and water. In a 2017 study of beaver dam hydrology, monitored beaver dams in a Rocky Mountain peatland were found to increase groundwater storage and regional water balance, which can be beneficial for preventing drought. The study also suggested potential to improve carbon sequestration.

=== Excess nutrient removal ===
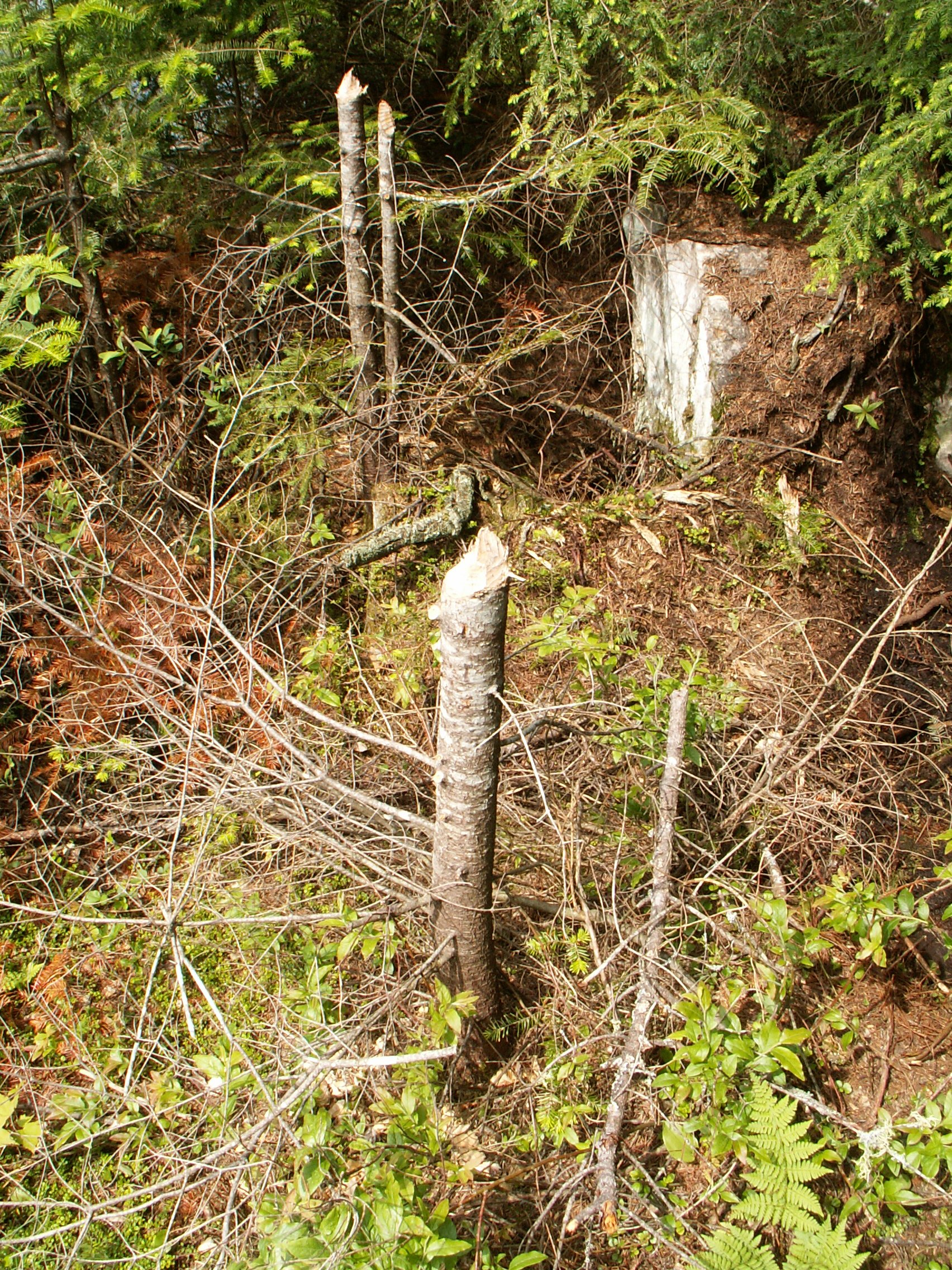
Beavers working on top of heavy snowfall make cuts that are high above ground.

Beaver ponds can cause the removal of nutrients from the stream flow. Farming along the banks of rivers often increases the loads of phosphates, nitrates and other nutrients, which can cause eutrophication and may contaminate drinking water. Besides silt, the beaver dam collects twigs and branches from the beavers' activity as well as leaves, notably in the autumn. The main component of this material is cellulose, a polymer of β-glucose monomers. (This creates a more crystalline structure than is found in starch, which is composed of α-glucose monomers. Cellulose is a type of polysaccharide.) Many bacteria produce cellulase which can split off the glucose and use it for energy. Just as algae receive energy from sunlight, these bacteria derive energy from cellulose, and form the base of a very similar food chain.

Additionally, bacterial populations absorb nitrogen and phosphorus compounds as they pass by in the water stream and keep these and other nutrients in the beaver pond and the surrounding ecology.

=== Pesticide and herbicide removal ===
Agriculture introduces herbicides and pesticides into streams. Some of these toxicants are metabolized and decomposed by the bacteria in the cellulose-rich bottom of a beaver dam.

=== Denitrification ===
Some scientists believe that the nitrogen cascade – the production of more fixed nitrogen than the natural cycles can turn back into nitrogen gas – may be as much of a problem to Earth's ecology as carbon dioxide production. Studies have shown that beaver dams along a stream contribute to denitrification (the conversion of nitrogen compounds back into nitrogen). Bacteria in the dirt and the plant debris, which collects at the dams, turns nitrates into nitrogen gas. The gas bubbles to the surface and mixes with the atmosphere once more.

=== Salmon and trout ===
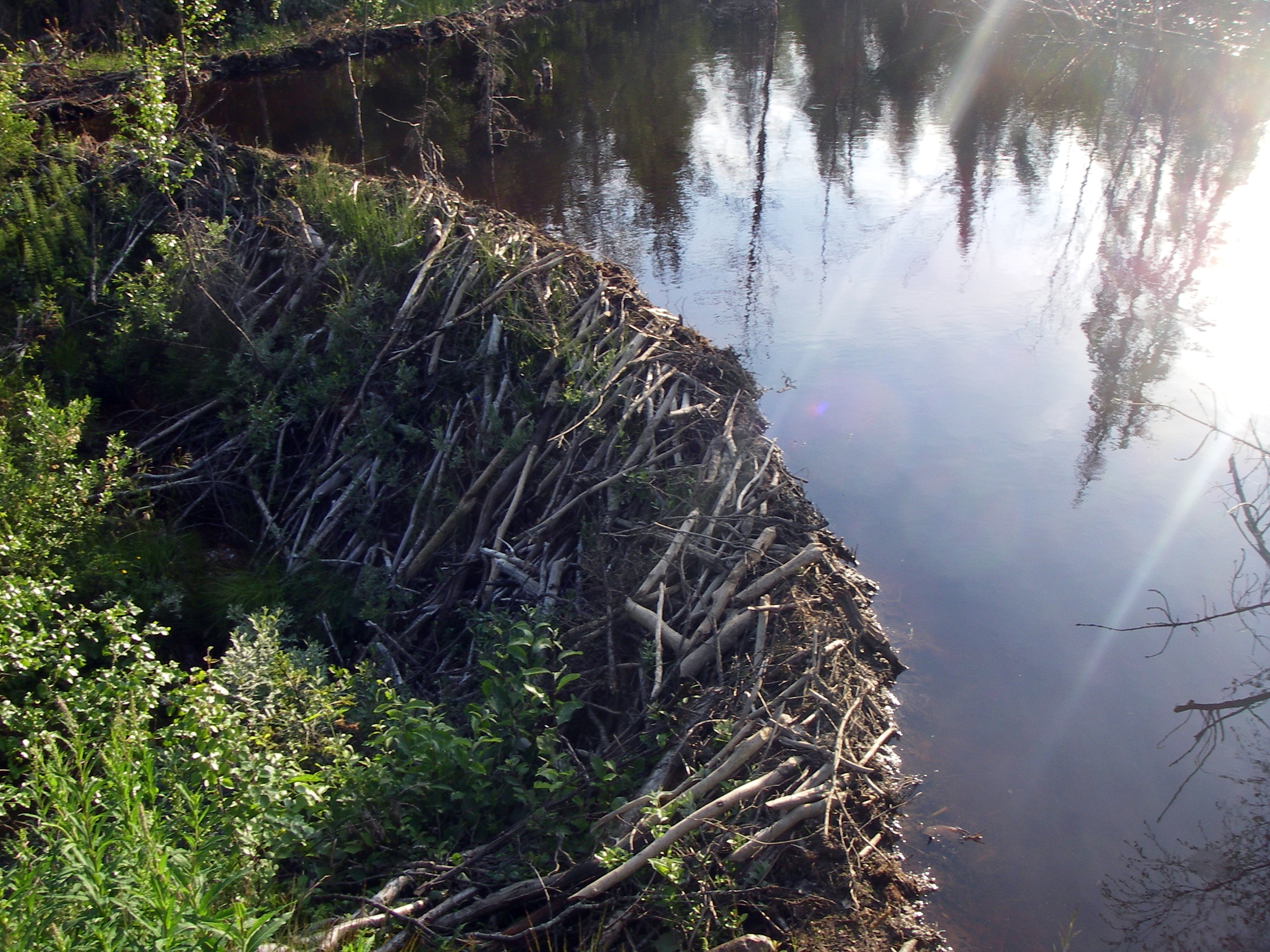
Large beaver dam near Olden, Jämtland, Sweden

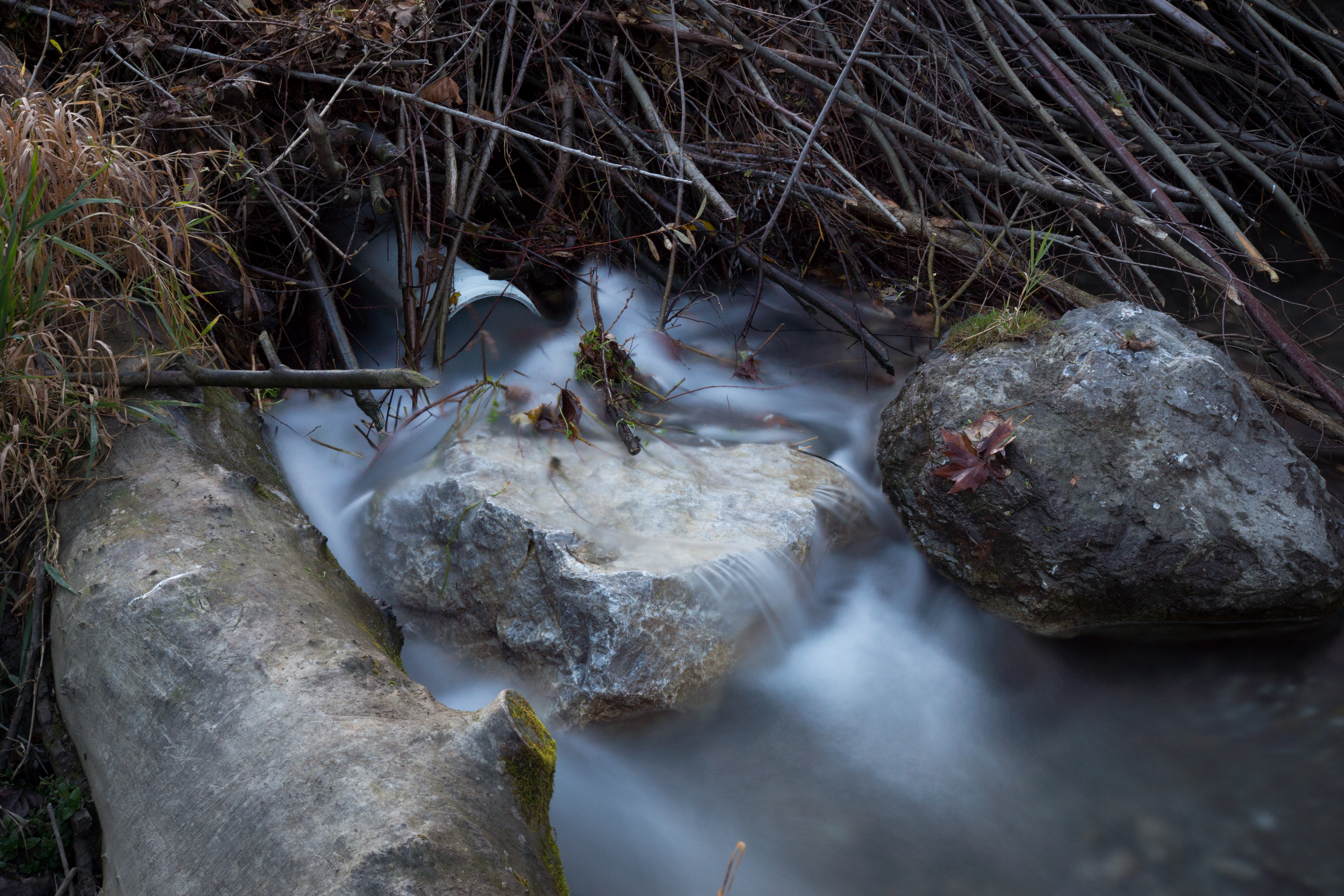
An experimental pipe through a beaver dam, placed to allow migratory fish to cross through the dam during their spawning season

Beaver dams and the associated ponds can provide nurseries for salmon and trout. An early indication of this was seen following the 1818 agreement between the British government of Canada and the government of America allowing Americans access to the Columbia watershed. The Hudson's Bay Company, in a fit of pique, instructed its trappers to extirpate the fur-bearing animals in the area. The beaver was the first to be made locally extinct. Salmon runs fell precipitously in the following years, even though none of the factors associated with the decline of salmon runs were extant at that time.

There are several reasons why beaver dams increase salmon runs. They produce ponds that are deep enough for juvenile salmon to hide from predatory wading birds. They trap nutrients in their ecology and notably the nutrient pulse represented by the migration of the adult salmon upstream. These nutrients help feed the juveniles after the yolk sac has been digested. The dams provide calm water which means that the young salmon can use energy for growth rather than for navigating currents; larger smolts with a food reserve have a better rate of survival when they reach the sea. Finally, beaver dams keep the water clear which favours all salmonoids.

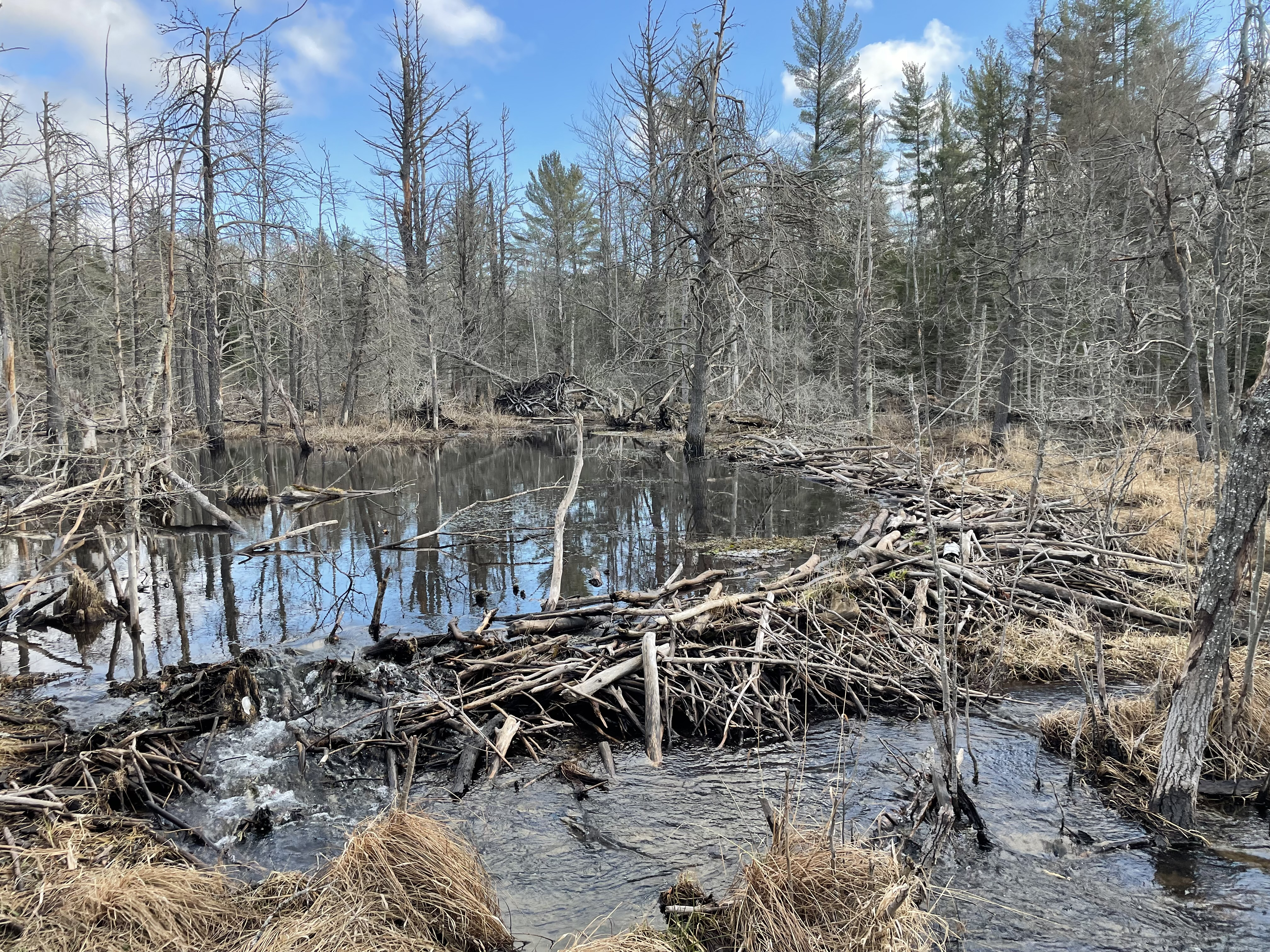
Smaller beaver dam on a creek near Fife Lake, Michigan

=== Frogs ===
Beaver dams have been shown to be beneficial to frog and toad populations, likely because they provide protected areas for larvae to mature in warmer, well-oxygenated water. A study in Alberta, Canada, showed that "Pitfall traps on beaver ponds captured 5.7 times more newly metamorphosed wood frogs, 29 times more western toads and 24 times more boreal chorus frogs than on nearby free-flowing streams."

=== Birds ===
Beaver dams help migrating songbirds. By stimulating the growth of species of plants that are critical to populations of songbirds in decline, beaver dams help create food and habitat. The presence of beaver dams has been shown to be associated with an increased diversity of songbirds. They can also have positive effects on local waterfowl, such as ducks, that are in need of standing water habitats.

=== Disruption ===
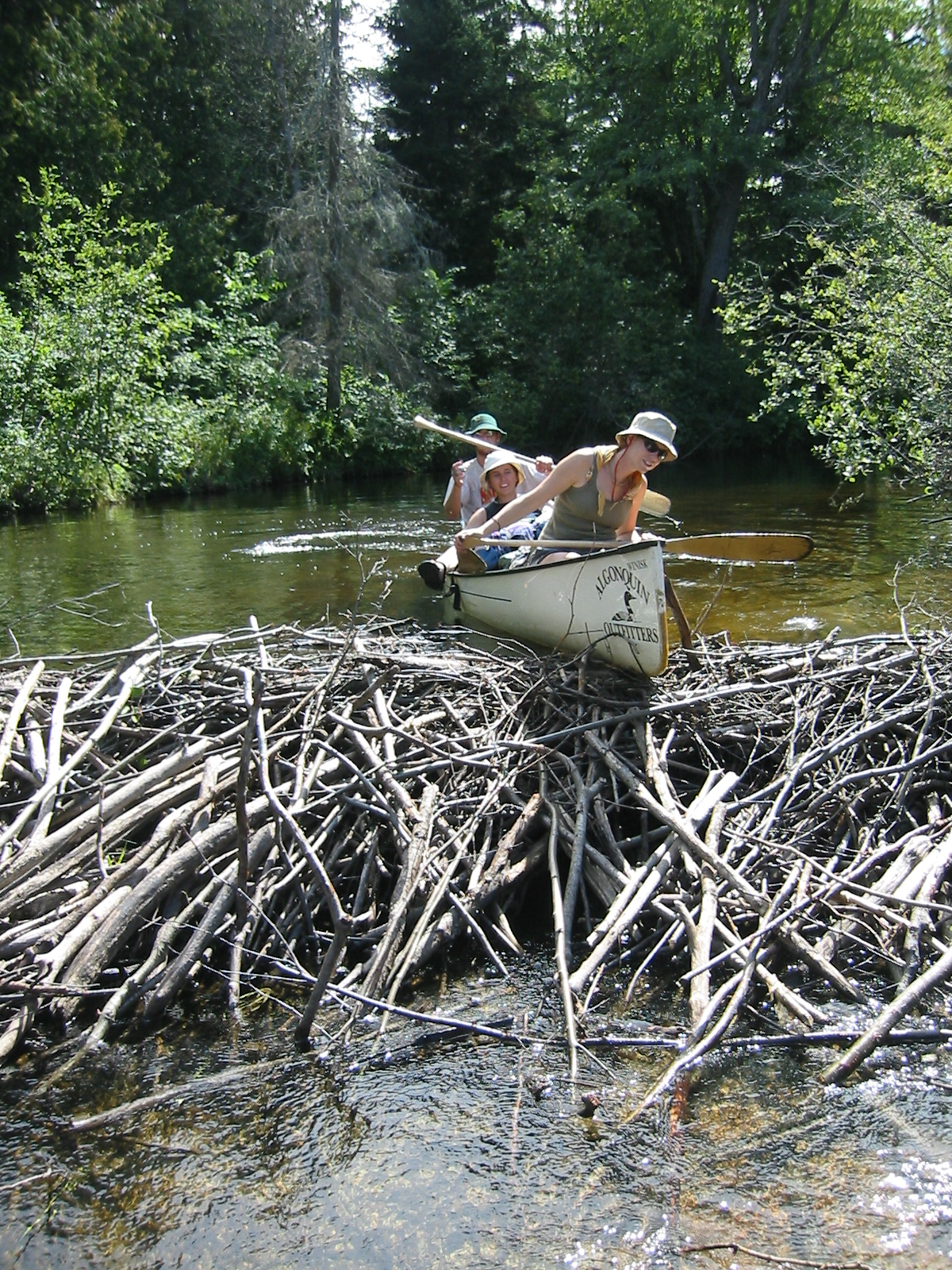
Canoeists try to run a beaver dam in Algonquin Park. The dam is about 1 metre (3 ft 3 in) high.

Beaver dams can be disruptive; the flooding can cause extensive property damage, and, when the flooding occurs next to a railroad roadbed, it can cause derailments by washing out the tracks. When a beaver dam bursts, the resulting flash flood may overwhelm a culvert.

Traditional solutions to beaver problems have been focused on the trapping and removal of all the beavers in the area. While this is sometimes necessary, it is typically a short-lived solution, as beaver populations have made a remarkable comeback in the United States (after near extirpation in the nineteenth century) and are likely to continually recolonize suitable habitat. Modern solutions include relatively cost-effective and low maintenance flow devices.

Introduced to an area without its natural predators, as in Tierra del Fuego, beavers have flooded thousands of acres of land and are considered a plague. One notable difference in Tierra del Fuego from most of North America is that the trees in Tierra del Fuego cannot be coppiced as can willows, poplars, aspens, and other North American trees. Thus the damage by the beavers seems more severe. The beaver's disruption is not limited to human geography; beavers can destroy nesting habitat for endangered species.

Warming temperatures in the Arctic allow beavers to extend their habitat further north, where their dams impair boat travel, impact access to food, affect water quality, and endanger downstream fish populations. Pools formed by the dams store heat, thus changing local hydrology and causing localized thawing of permafrost that in turn contributes to global warming.

== Stream life cycle ==
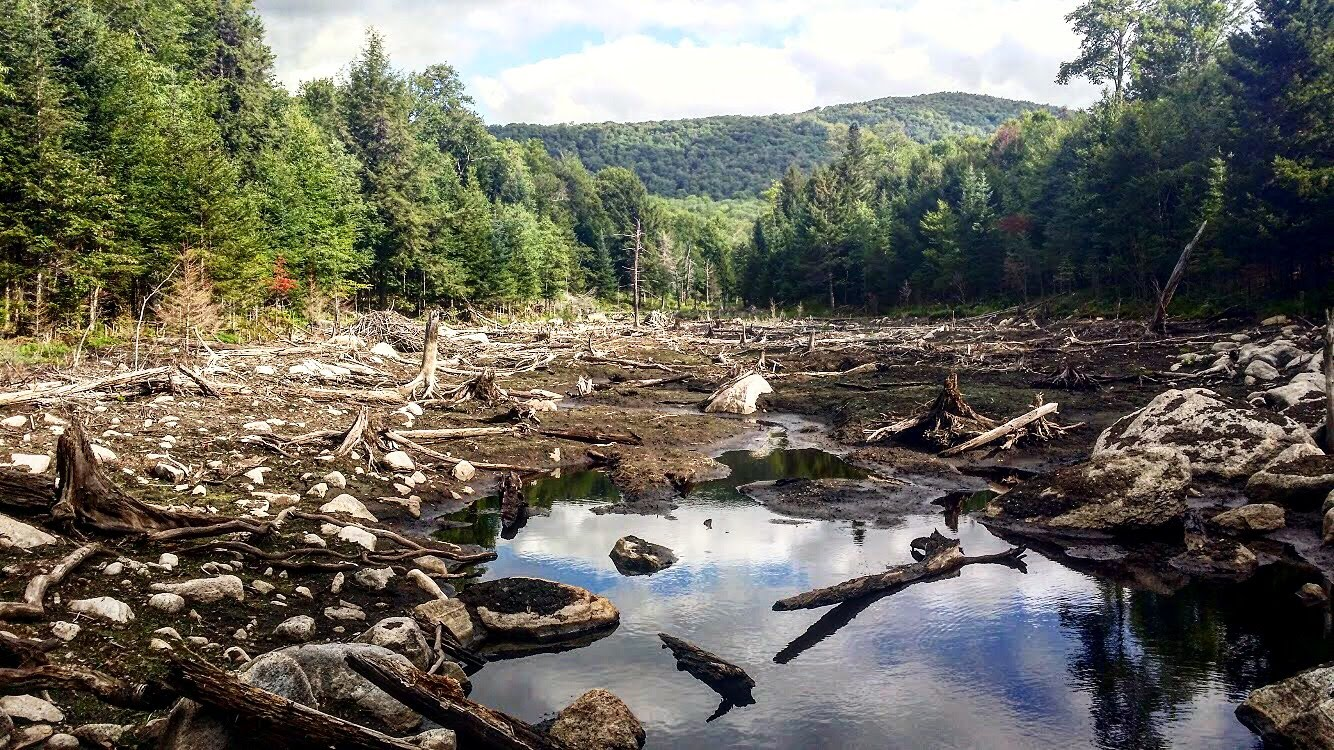
Drained beaver pond in Adirondack State Park

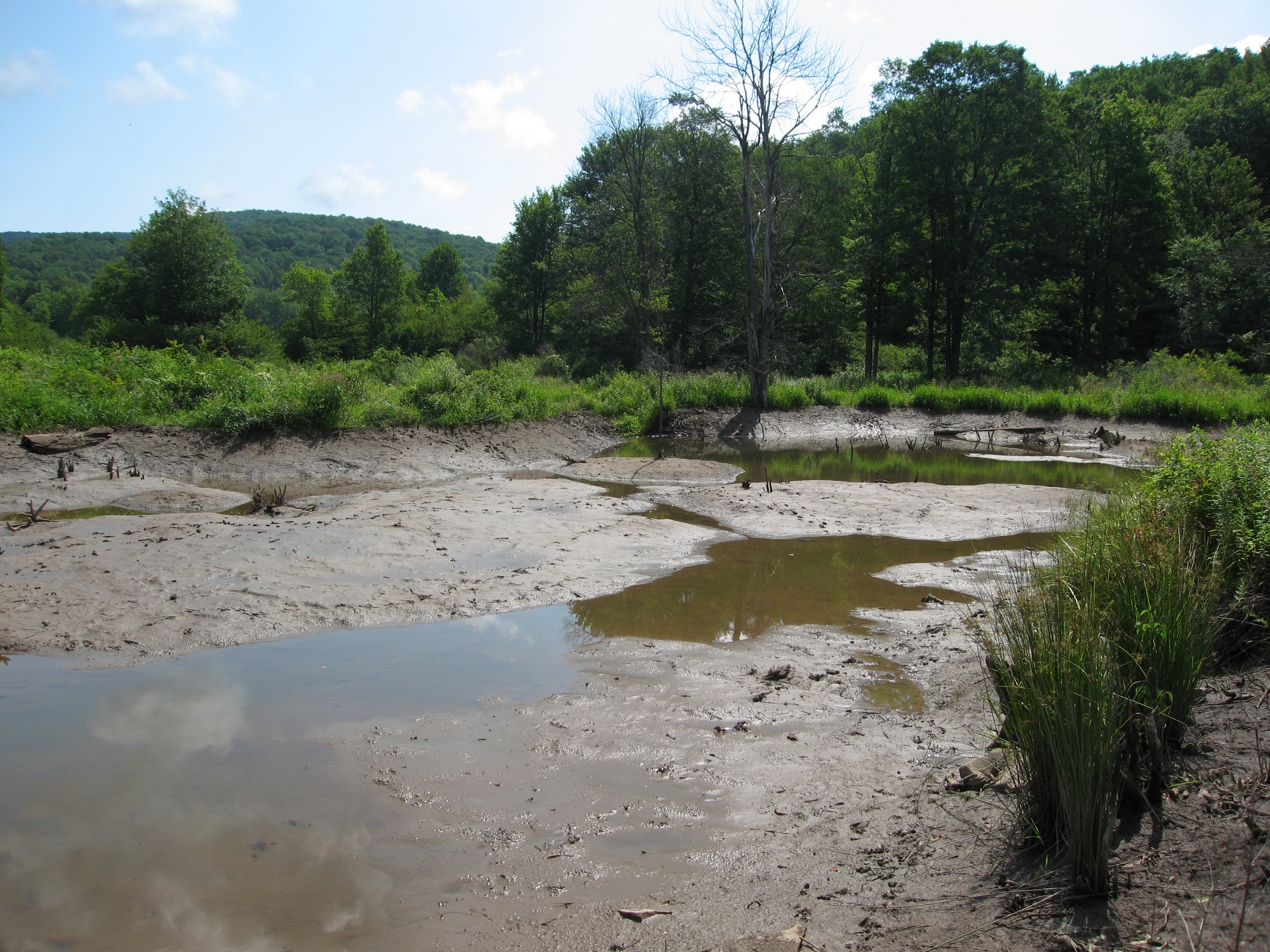
Drained beaver pond in Allegany State Park

=== Wetland creation ===
If a beaver pond becomes too shallow due to sediment accumulation, or the tree supply is depleted, beavers will abandon the site, leaving a wetland behind. Eventually the dam will be breached and the water will drain out. The rich thick layer of silt, branches, and dead leaves behind the old dam is an ideal habitat for some wetland species.

=== Meadow creation ===
As the wetland fills up with plant debris and dries out, pasture species colonize it and the wetland may eventually become a meadow suitable for grazing in a previously forested area. This provides a valuable niche for many animals which otherwise would be excluded. Beaver dam creation also increases the plants the dams were made from (such as willows) to reproduce by cutting, encouraging the growth of adventitious roots.

=== Riverine forest ===
Finally, the meadow will be colonized by riverine trees, typically aspens, willows and such species which are favoured by the beaver. Beavers are then likely to recolonize the area, and the cycle begins again.

=== Bottomland ===
Each time the stream life cycle repeats itself another layer of organic soil is added to the bottom of the valley. The valley slowly fills and the flat area at the bottom widens. Research is sparse, but it seems likely that parts of the bottomland in North America was created, or at least added to, by the efforts of the generations of beavers that lived there.

== Beaver dam analogs (BDAs) ==
Humans sometimes build structures similar to beaver dams in streams, either to get the benefits of beaver dams in places without beavers, or to encourage beavers to settle in a particular area. These are often called "beaver dam analogs" (BDA) although other names are also used. When the goal is to attract beavers, sometimes the site is unsuitable in its present condition, such as being too eroded for beavers to build a dam in their usual way. BDA builders may use construction techniques beyond the beaver's capabilities, such as driving wooden posts into the stream bed to brace horizontal branches that would otherwise be washed away. The hope is that beavers who wander by or are brought in will choose to live there and take over construction and maintenance of the dam. Even if beavers do not take over the dam, BDAs provide many of the benefits of natural beaver dams.

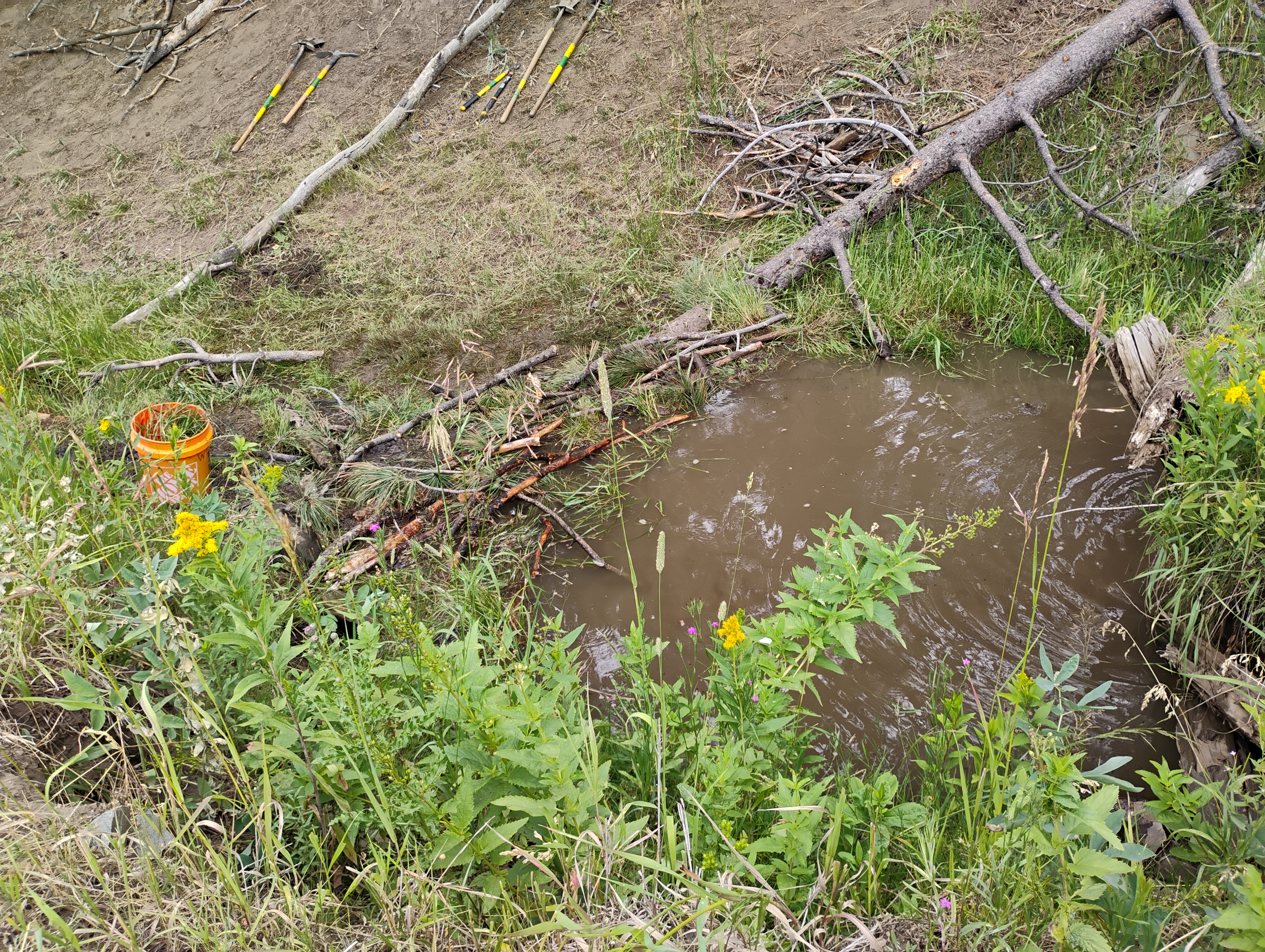
A mostly-complete beaver dam analogue under construction near Genesee, Colorado

In Bridge Creek, Oregon BDAs were quickly adopted by beavers and led to a dramatic 175% increase in steelhead trout (Oncorhynchus mykiss) abundance. In 2026 Pollock et al. published the similarly dramatic impact of installing BDAs on coho salmon (Oncorhynchus kisutch) in the Sugar Creek and French Creek tributaries of the mainstem Scott River: juvenile coho salmon survival rose from 8% to 60% and in two years became the dominant source of coho in four nearby Klamath River tributaries.

Shaun Overton, a former software programmer from Fort Worth, Texas, purchased Dustups Ranch, a 320-acre plot in Far West Texas near the Eagle Mountains, with the goal of transforming a barren desert into a thriving desert forest using artificial beaver dams method.

== See also ==
- Environmental impacts of beavers
- Logjam, an accumulation of wood debris on a river or stream
