= Lac Megantic =

Lac Megantic may refer to:

- Lac Mégantic or Lake Mégantic, a lake in Quebec near its border with Maine
- Lac-Mégantic, Quebec, a town on the shores of the lake, at the lake's outlet to the Chaudière River
  - Lac-Mégantic rail disaster, a 2013 train derailment, fire and explosion in the town

== See also ==
- Megantic (disambiguation)
