= Beavers in Southern Patagonia =

Beavers in region of Chile and Argentina

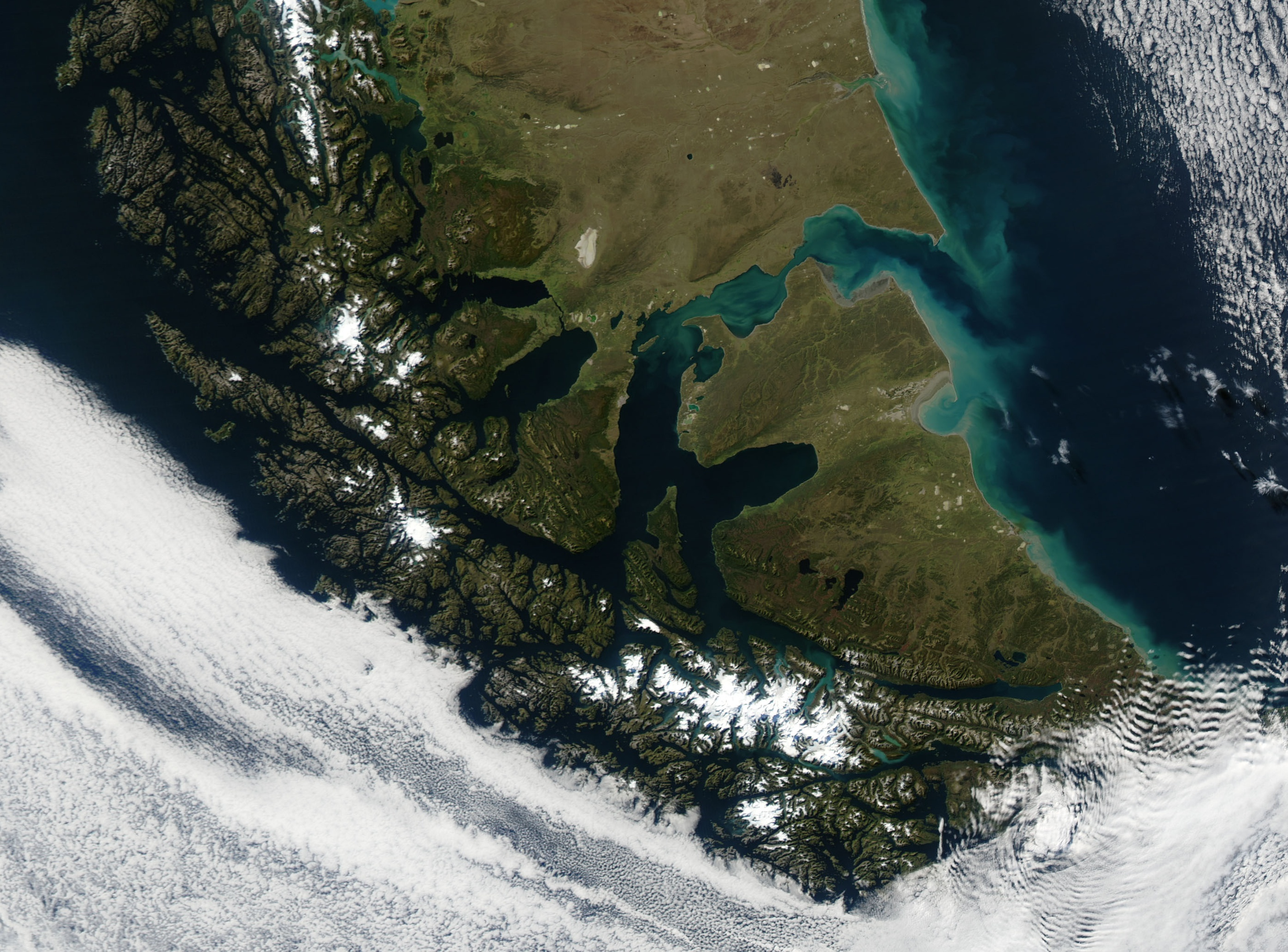
Satellite view of Tierra del Fuego.

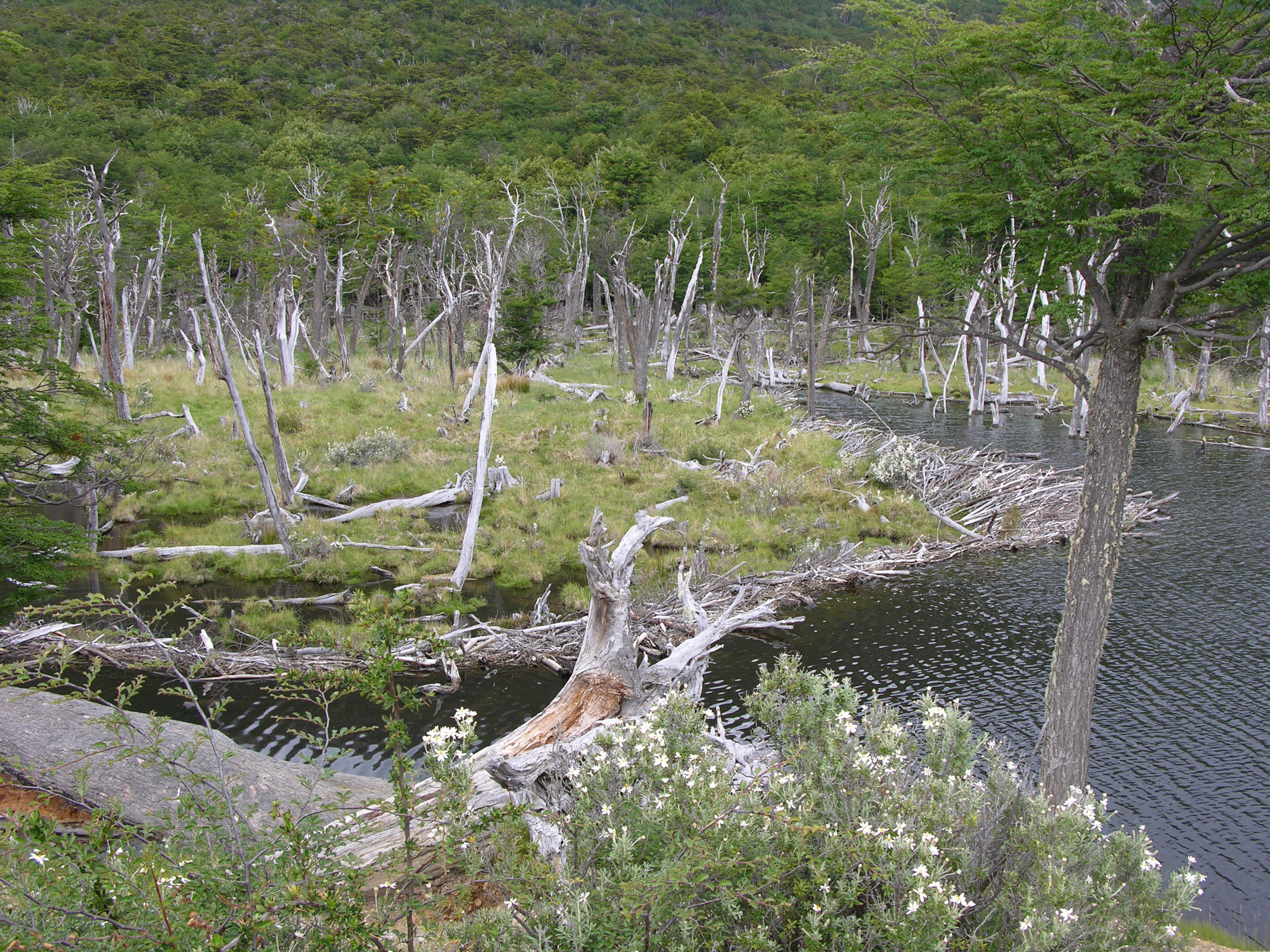
Dead trees as a result of the construction of a beaver dam.

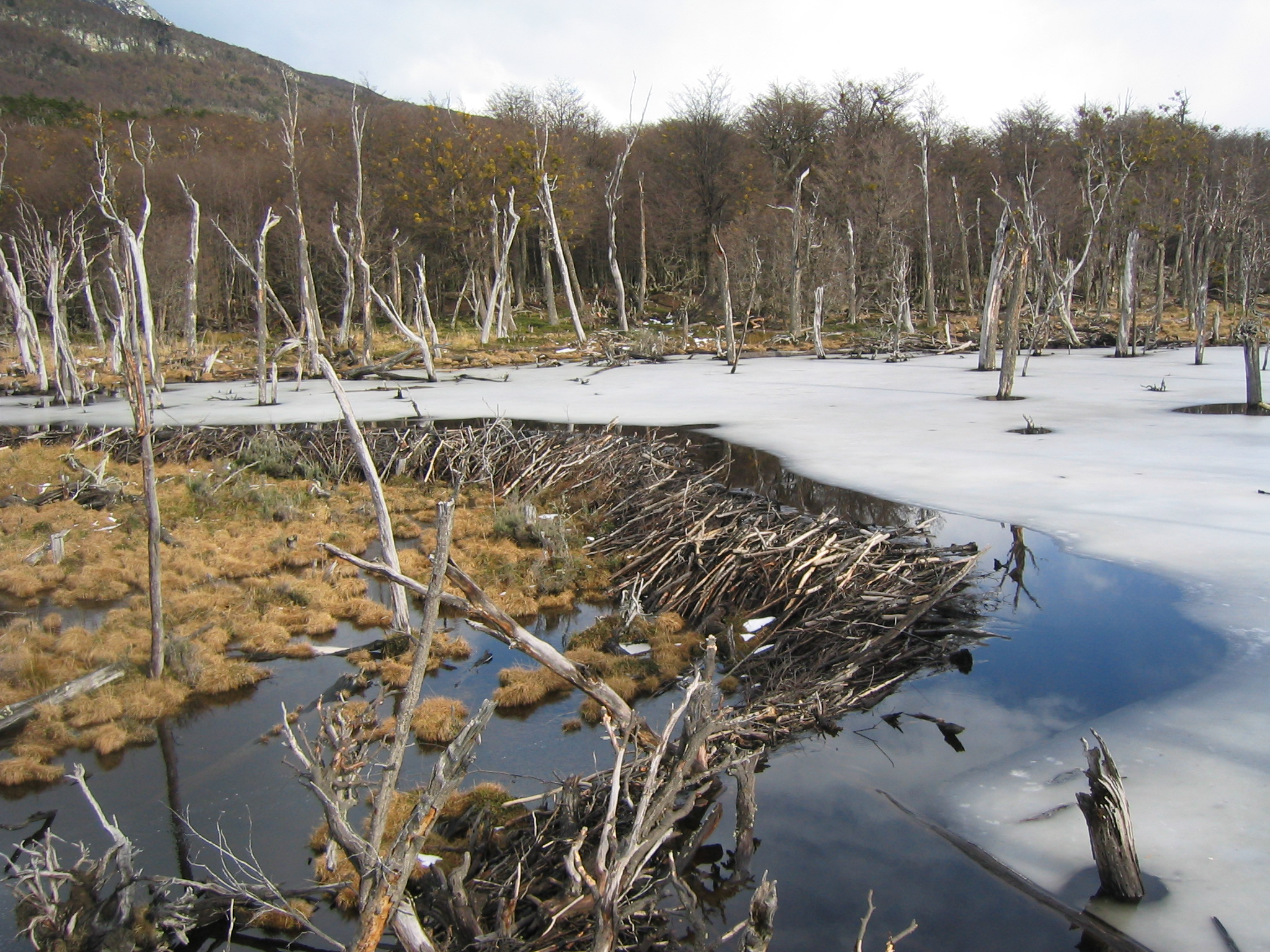
Beaver dam in Tierra del Fuego

The North American beaver (Castor canadensis) is an invasive species in Tierra del Fuego, at the southern end of Patagonia. Tierra del Fuego is a large island encompassing parts of Chile and Argentina, so policies and actions to control the species have mainly been binational. The beavers were introduced to the area in 1946 in an effort by the Argentine government to establish a fur trade in the region. Since then, the beavers have spread throughout most of Tierra del Fuego and have also been seen on the Brunswick Peninsula of mainland Chile. When the fur trade failed to establish, the beavers became problematic and the two governments agreed to intervene to eradicate them.

A June 2011 NPR report stated that the beavers have caused millions of dollars of damage. According to Nature, it is the largest eradication project ever attempted.

== Background and history ==
In 1946, the Argentinian government imported 20 beavers from Canada, which were to be released in Cami Lake with the intention of creating a commercial fur trading industry. Though a viable industry ultimately failed to establish, the introduction of beavers into the region has had far-reaching consequences.

North American beavers do not have many natural predators in the area. In their natural range in North America, bears and wolves prey on the beavers and keep the population under control. One observer noted that anyone considering importing beavers should also import bears, those being the beavers' natural predators. According to a June 2011 NPR report, 200,000 beavers were living in the area. Another report put the number in excess of 100,000, and stated the level of destruction as akin to having bulldozers thrashing through the area.

Tierra del Fuego National Park in Argentina is especially threatened, as the beavers are destroying long-protected trees. The animals have spread beyond Tierra del Fuego itself into the Brunswick Peninsula of Chile, and the government fears further penetration into continental South America. The beavers already threaten around sixteen million hectares of indigenous forest. Unlike many trees in North America, trees in South America often do not regenerate when coppiced, destroying the forest.

As well as felling trees, the animals create dams that drown trees and other vegetation while creating freshwater ponds and lakes. Flooding from beaver dams also damages roads and cattle pastures. Ecologist Christopher Anderson, professor at the Universidad de Magallanes, has said, "The change in the forested portion of this biome is the largest landscape-level alteration in the Holocene – that is, approximately 10,000 years".

A 2017 survey of Tierra del Fuego land managers and researchers showed significant support for eradicating beavers and restoring the landscape. The support for eradication is strongest among managers, while support for restoration is stronger among researchers.

== Impacts ==
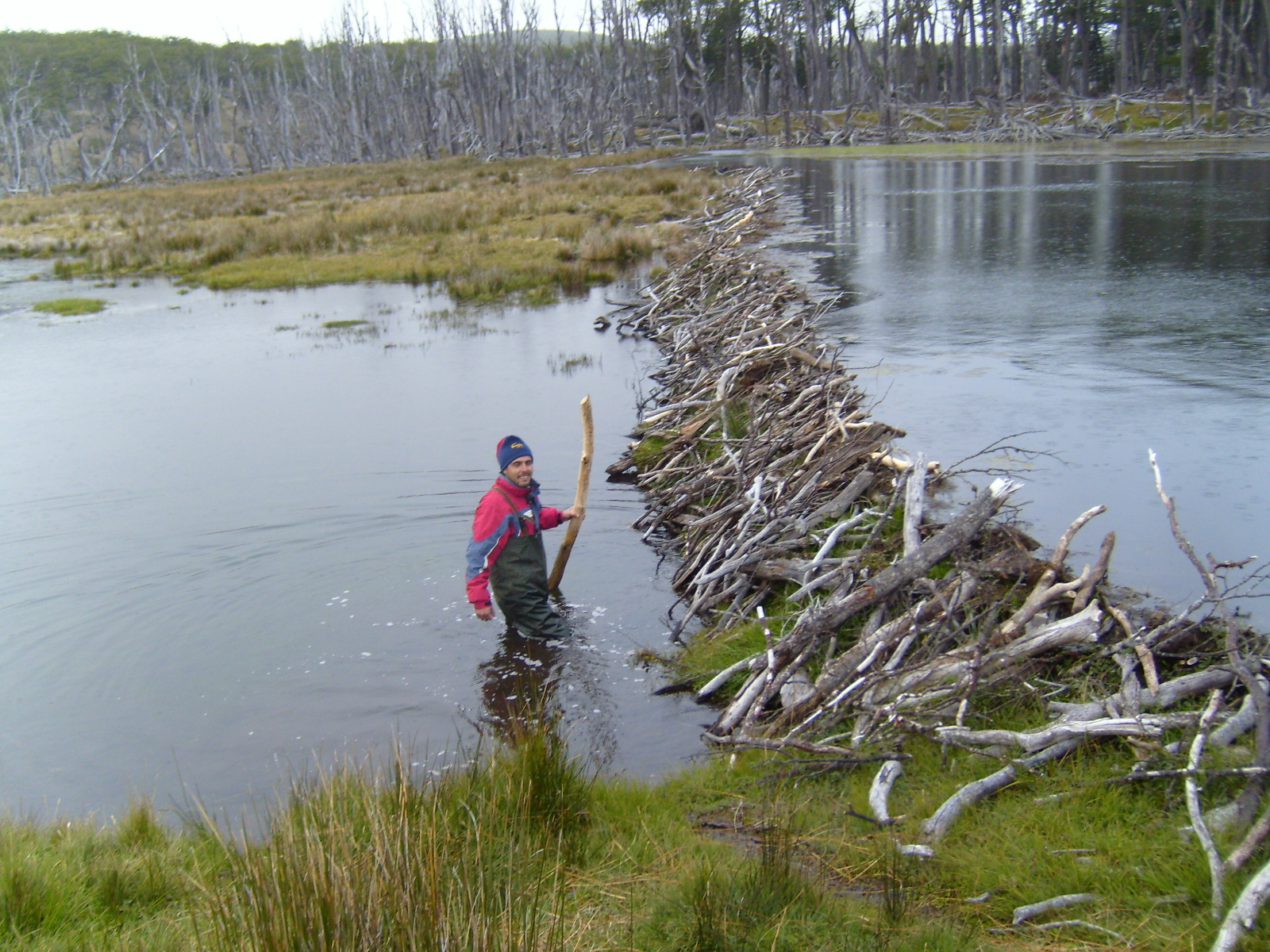
A beaver dam in Tierra del Fuego.

The impact of the beavers on Tierra del Fuego's forest landscape has been described as "the largest landscape-level alteration in subantarctic forests since the last ice age." One factor contributing to their success as invaders is the lack of predators in Tierra del Fuego. Another is the reluctance of local people to hunt beavers, which has led to the beaver population growing almost exponentially. Another factor is that Tierra del Fuego provides exceptional habitat for beavers, with much of the area being close to watercourses, and forested with trees and other plants that provide sources of food and shelter.

Beaver damage to the environment of Tierra del Fuego has been extensive, including structural changes in habitat, including the destruction of riparian trees, hydrological changes to rivers via the creation of dams, sediment deposition and increasing retention and accumulation of nutrients and organic matter in rivers and streams. The local habitats have little ability to recover from beaver damage.

Apart from causing structural changes to the landscape, an act which causes a cascade of effects along the entire ecosystem by destroying habitat and also facilitating invasions of other exotic plants and animals, beavers have affected the local human population as their range expanded from the originally remote introduction site. Impacts include the flooding of roads and farmland, as well as the destruction of internet and cell service poles, and livestock fences. It is estimated that these problems cost Argentina alone $66 million a year.

== Policies ==
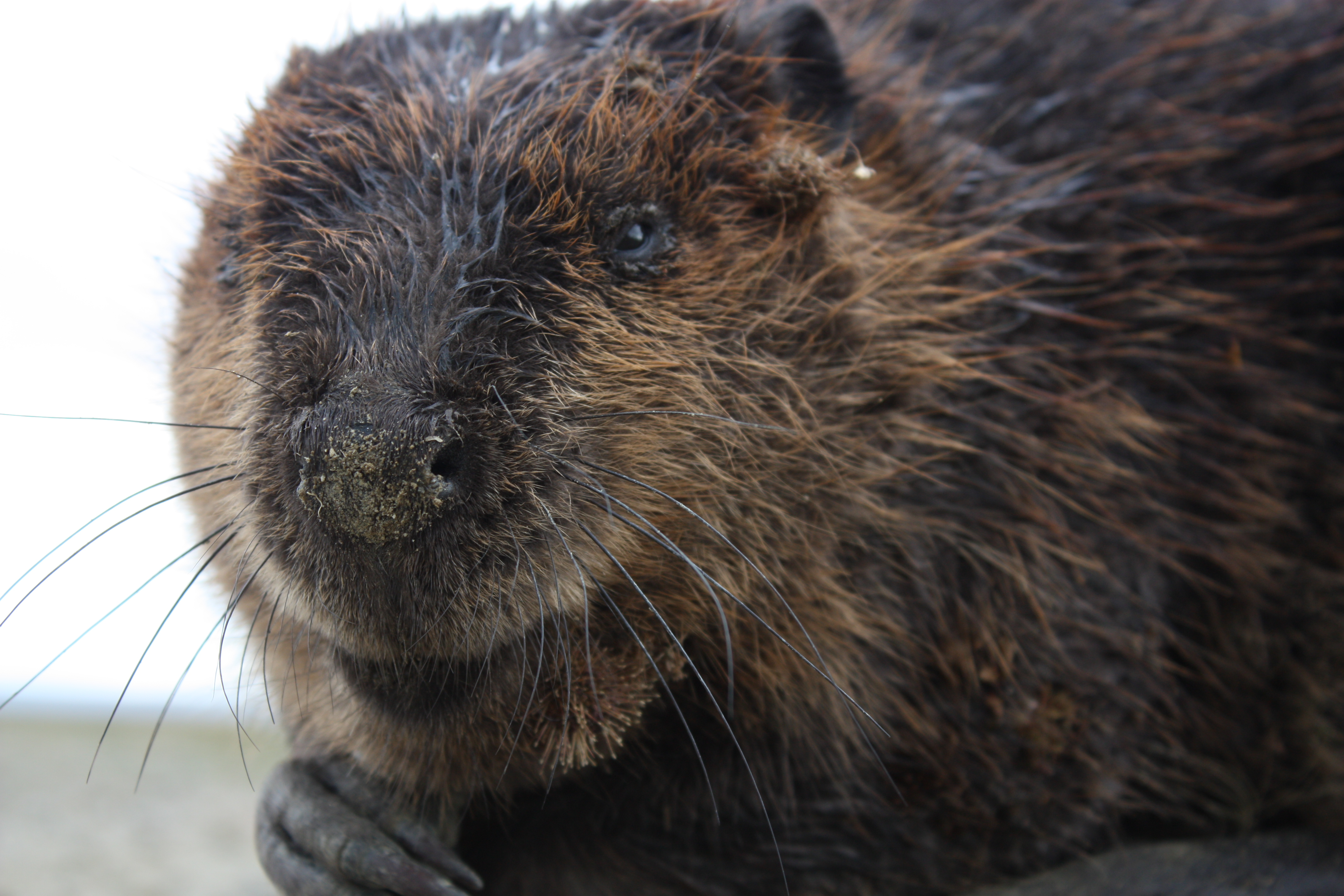
North American beaver found in Chile

One attempt to address the problem was through encouraging recreational hunting of the animal, with previous protection laws repealed. However, the resulting hunting effort was insufficient to be effective. The pelts are not highly valued in local markets, a reason the fur trade did not take off in the 1940s as the Argentine government had hoped. This lack of financial incentive meant that hunters had to kill purely for sport. A cultural factor is that beavers are not viewed as destructive invaders, but as likeable, peaceful, dam-building herbivores.

In 2008, Chile and Argentina passed binational legislation, Resolution 157/10, that ended the policy of population control and called for complete eradication of the species from Tierra del Fuego. This was passed in accordance with research conducted by scientists from nations like the United States and New Zealand that found that this method was possible but expensive, costing an estimated $33 million.

== Methods ==
Some park rangers use steel traps that snap down on the animal's head and instantly kill it. Private individuals receive rewards for trapping beavers, although – as of 2011 – success had been elusive. That same year, government officials announced plans to bring in professional trappers, using dogs, helicopters and boats to move in rolling fronts. Ongoing efforts have been subjected to scientific study. As of 2011 the emphasis in the Tierra del Fuego National Park was on control, not on eradication, as killing of invasives was disfavoured for animal welfare reasons.

== See also ==
- Beaver drop
- Tierra del Fuego Province, Argentina
- Tierra del Fuego Province, Chile
