= Christopher B. Anderson =

American ecologist

- Born: December 31, 1976 (age 49); North Carolina, U.S.
- Education: University of North Carolina at Chapel Hill (B.S.); Odum School of Ecology – University of Georgia (PhD)
- Scientific career
- Fields: Ecology, conservation biology
- Workplaces: Austral Center for Scientific Research, Ushuaia, Argentina

Christopher B. Anderson (born 31 December 1976 in North Carolina) is an American ecologist working in southern Patagonia's Tierra del Fuego Archipelago, shared between Chile and Argentina. Anderson obtained his B.S. in biology with honors from the University of North Carolina at Chapel Hill in 1999 and his PhD in ecology from the Odum School of Ecology – University of Georgia in 2006. His research in southern Patagonia has involved social entrepreneurial efforts, as well, such as the creation of the Omora Sub-Antarctic Research Alliance (USA), a non-profit dedicated to promoting research, education and conservation in Tierra del Fuego and southern Patagonia. Anderson and his colleagues also have developed long-term socio-ecological research platforms that attempt to link long-term academic endeavors with society to demonstrate the inextricable union between conservation and social well-being. In 2005, this initiative was able to successfully apply to UNESCO to obtain the designation of the Cape Horn Biosphere Reserve.

Anderson was the founding coordinator of Chile's Long-Term Socio-Ecological Research Network, and from 2009 to 2011 was the administrative director of the Sub-Antarctic Biocultural Conservation Program, a binational effort between the University of North Texas and the Universiad de Magallanes. Currently, he is a visiting scientist at the Forestry Resources Lab at the Austral Center for Scientific Research in Ushuaia, Argentina, where his research focuses broadly on watershed ecosystem ecology and the role of invasive species in Tierra del Fuego, particularly the eradication of North American beavers. Honors for his research and teaching include a Fulbright Fellowship from the U.S. State Department, a National Security Education Program Grant from the U.S. Department of Defense, various National Science Foundation grants, a Tinker Foundation Award, and a UGA Excellence in Undergraduate Mentoring Award.
