= Godin (guitar manufacturer) =

Canadian musical instrument manufacturer

Godin Guitars
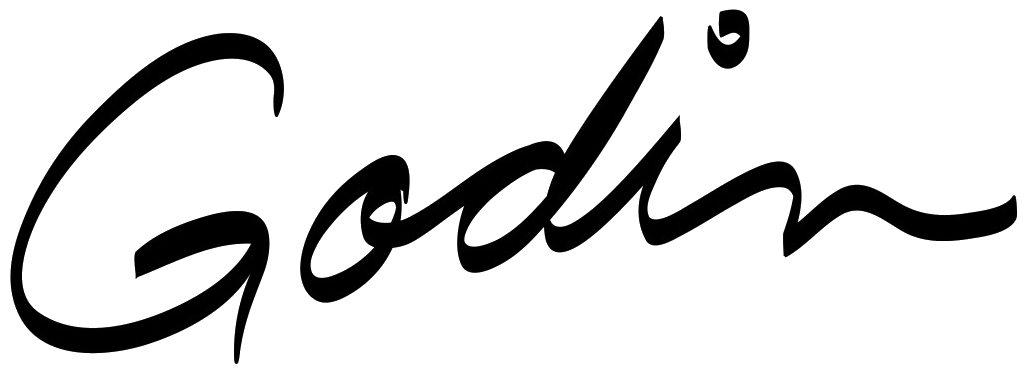
- Company type: Private
- Industry: Musical instruments
- Founded: 1972; 54 years ago
- Founder: Robert Godin
- Headquarters: Montreal, Quebec, Canada
- Area served: Worldwide
- Products: Electric and acoustic guitars, basses
- Number of employees: 1,000+
- Subsidiaries: Seagull Guitars; Simon & Patrick Guitars; Norman Guitars; Art & Lutherie Guitars; La Patrie Guitars; TRIC
- Website: godinguitars.com

Godin Guitars is a Canadian manufacturing company headquartered in Montreal that specializes in string instruments. The company was founded by Robert Godin CM, and is currently led by Simon Godin.

Range of products currently manufactured by Godin includes electric and acoustic guitars and basses. The company also produced ukuleles, mandolins, and ouds (named "multi oud") in the past.

== Overview ==
Godin started building Robert Godin's guitars in 1972 in La Patrie, Quebec. The head office is located in Montreal, and they build instruments in five factories in three locations in Quebec, Canada.

Godin Guitars makes instruments under several different labels. Norman makes entry- to pro-level acoustic guitars. Art & Lutherie makes entry-level budget acoustic guitars. The Simon and Patrick brand make mid- to high-range steel-string acoustics. La Patrie manufactures classical guitars. Seagull makes solid wood entry- to professional-range acoustic guitars. Guitars under the Godin brand are primarily mid-range to top-of the-line electrics that are made of high-quality wood from the northeastern part of North America. They have many models that feature synth hex pickups (MIDI-equipped) and some with piezo pickup-equipped bridges. Godin 'SA' guitars have piezo bridge pickups which provide six separate outputs via a Roland GK 13-pin output jack, making them compatible with Roland GR, and other guitar-synthesizer units, and the Roland VG series of guitar modelling units.

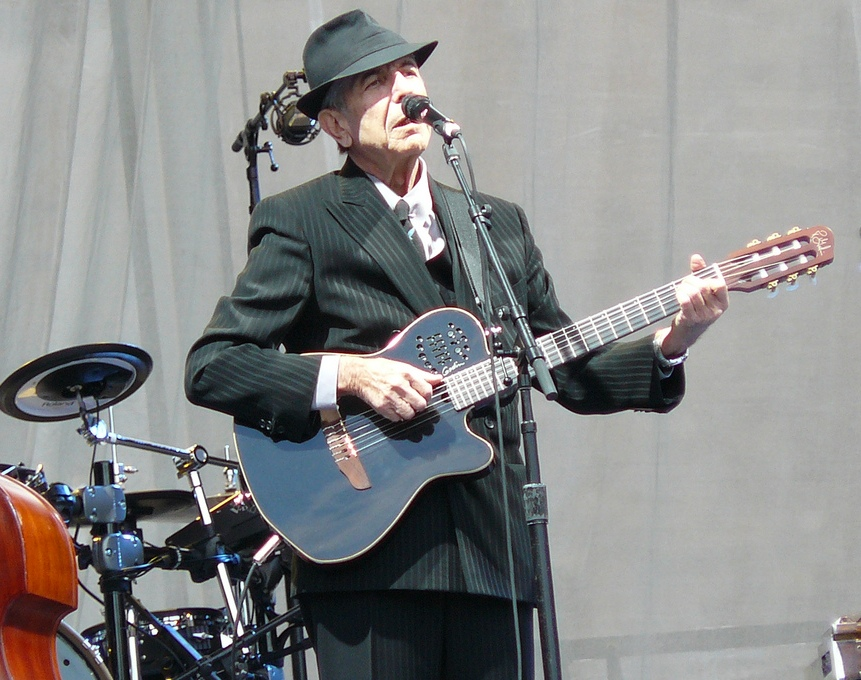
Leonard Cohen with a Godin guitar (2008)

Godin's guitars have won several awards, including Guitar Player magazine's Editors Pick for the LG, Exit 22, and Freeway Classic. Godin's popular LG Hmb is made of mahogany with a mahogany neck and a rosewood fretboard. The scale length is 24.75", the neck radius is 14" and it has 22 frets. The 2004 model features a five way switch for neck, neck-split to single, neck and humbucker in parallel, bridge-split to single and bridge. The pickups are ceramic. Godin is well known for the Multiac series of hybrid guitars which are available in steel string or nylon string versions, incorporating both piezo and magnetic pickups.

== Brands and products ==
Brand	Products
Godin Guitars	Guitars
Seagull Guitars	Acoustic guitars
Norman Guitars	Acoustic guitars
Simon & Patrick Guitars	Acoustic guitars
Art & Lutherie Guitars	Acoustic guitars

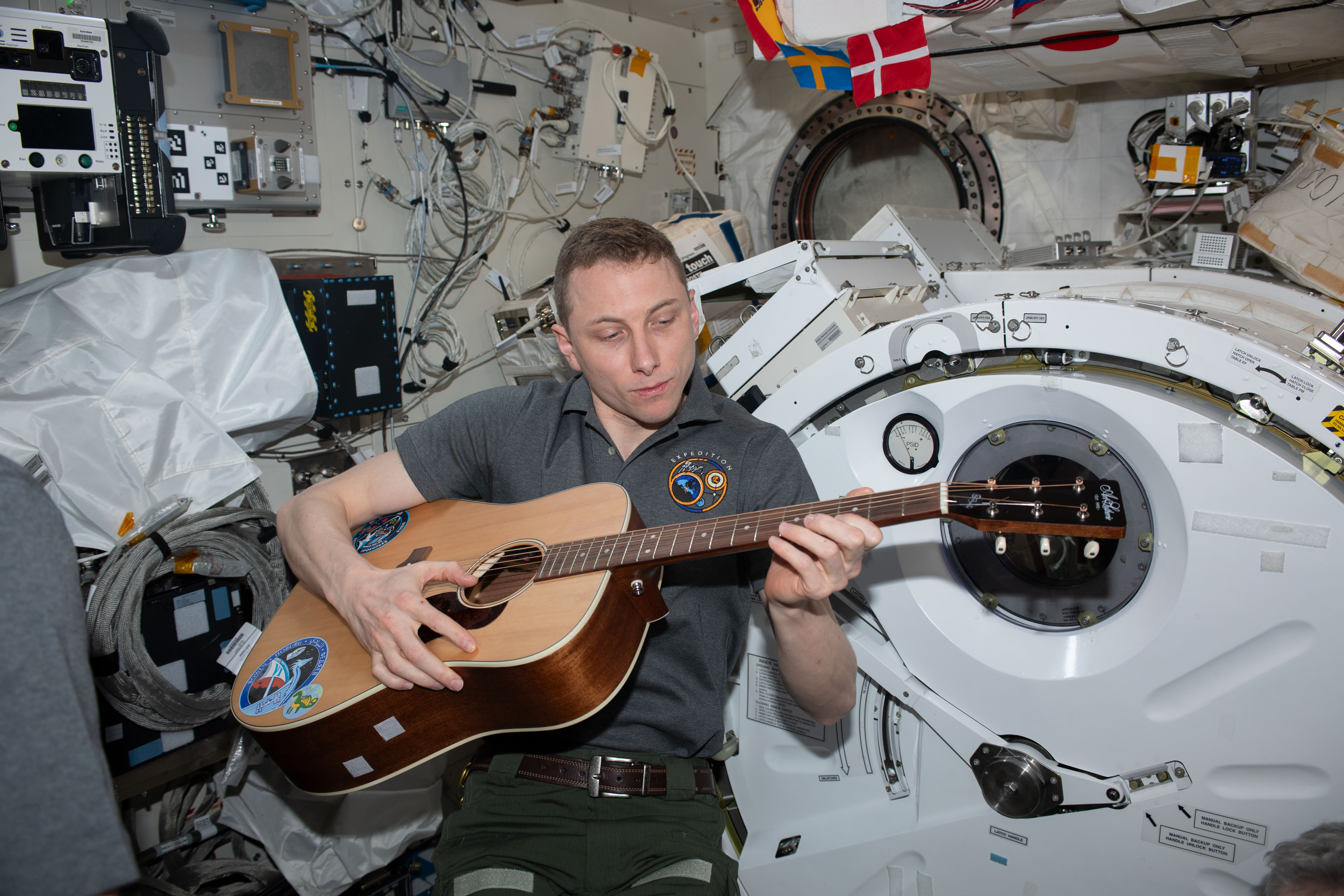
Art & Lutherie acoustic guitar being played by astronaut Warren Hoburg on the ISS (2023)
