= Mont-Mégantic National Park =

National park in Quebec, Canada

- IUCN category II (national park)
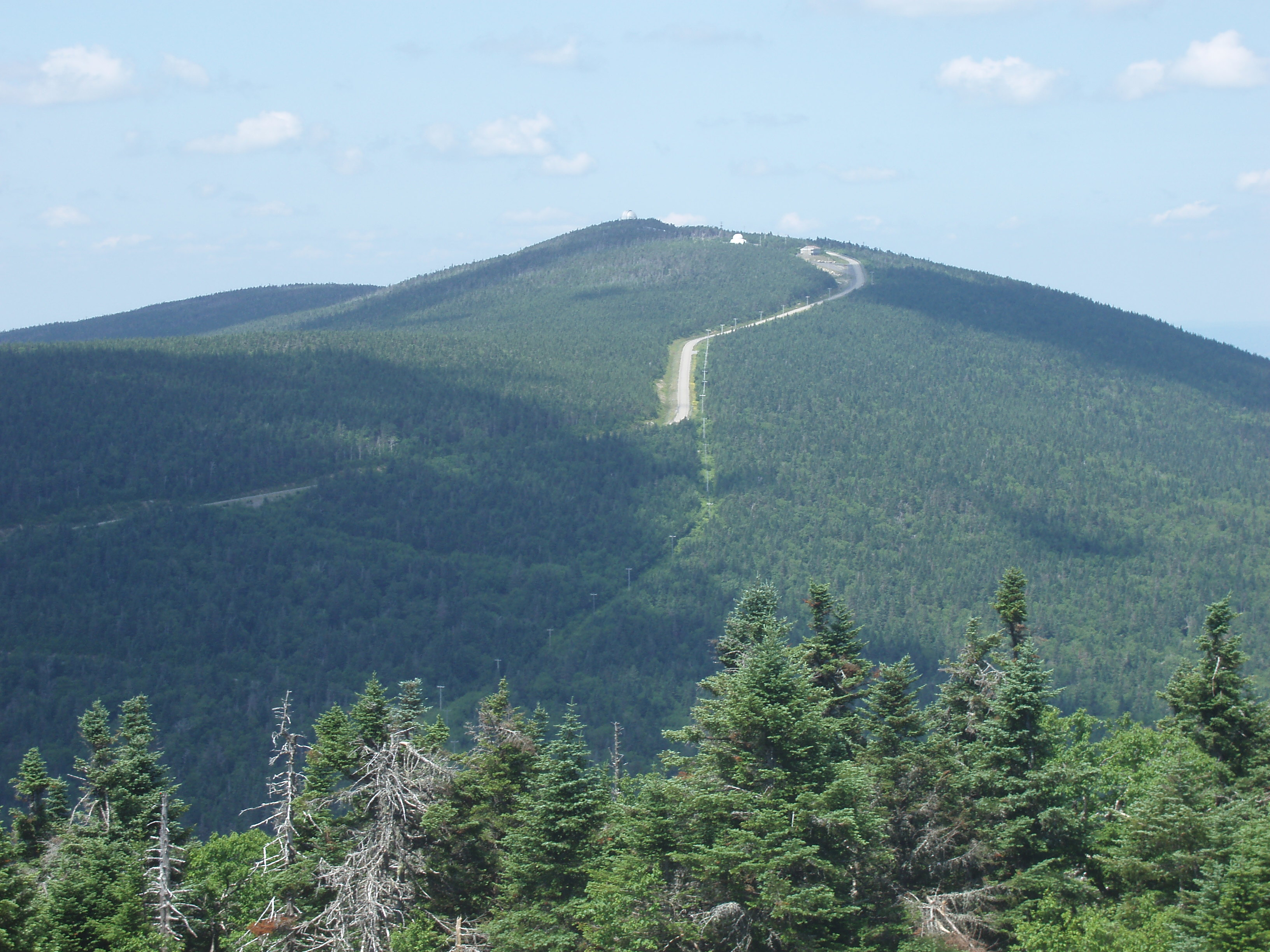
- Interactive map of Mont-Mégantic National Park
- Location: Hampden / La Patrie / Val-Racine, Quebec, Canada
- Nearest city: Sherbrooke
- Coordinates: 45°27′25″N 71°09′45″W
- Area: 54.86 km^{2} (21.18 sq mi)
- Established: June 16, 1994
- Visitors: 50 000
- Governing body: SÉPAQ

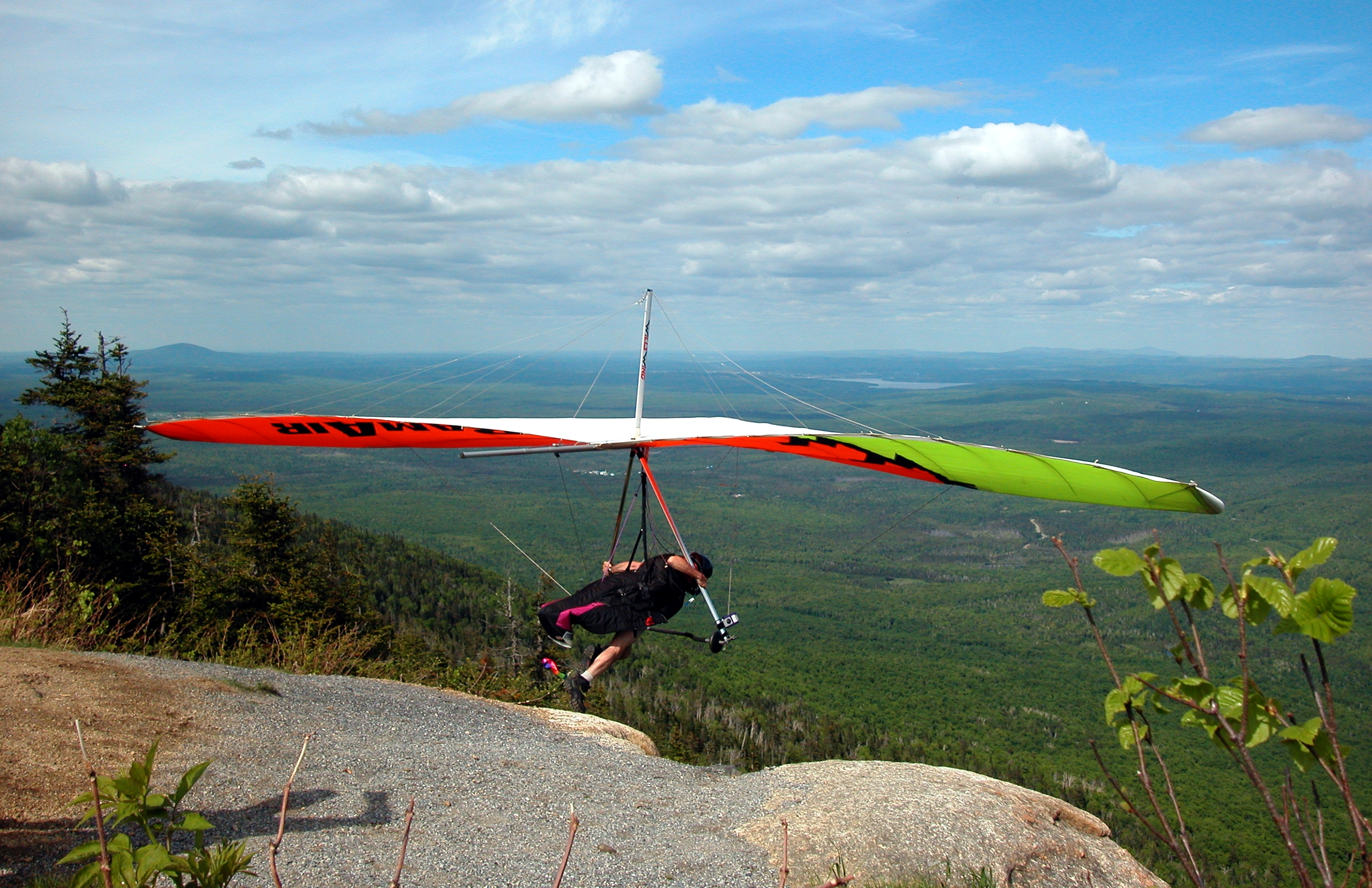
Hang-gliding off Mount St. Joseph

Mont-Mégantic National Park (Parc national du Mont-Mégantic) is a provincial park in Quebec, Canada. It is located near the municipality of Notre-Dame-des-Bois in the Estrie region. The park was created in 1994 and is adjacent to the Samuel-Brisson Ecological Reserve which is located northeast of it.

Mont Mégantic is the approximate geographic centre of the park. Located at its peak is the Mont Mégantic Observatory, which is the most important astronomical observatory in eastern Canada. Part of the park is Also recognized as important area for bird conservation.

The park is managed by the Quebec government through the Société des établissements de plein air du Québec (SÉPAQ).

== Special features of the park ==
The park terrain is characteristic of the frontier mountains in the Appalachia region, although the bulk of it is in fact the most easterly of the Montérégie. Four peaks are accessible by hiking trails including the Pic de l'Aurore (c. 825 m (2,707 ft)), Mont Victoria (c. 1,050 m (3,440 ft)), Mont St. Joseph (c. 1,075 m (3,527 ft)) and Mont Mégantic (c. 1,105 m (3,625 ft)). Mont Mégantic is the tenth highest mountain in Quebec and is the highest peak accessible by car.

The park is known for its scientific observatory at the top (at an elevation of 1,111 m (3,645 ft)). The observatory hosts a Ritchey-Chrétien telescope of 1.6 m (5.2 ft) (5'3") in diameter, the most powerful of this type in North America. The site is mainly used by the University of Montreal and Laval University who are the owners. If conditions permit, naked-eye observations are possible through the telescope during the Mont Mégantic Astronomy Festival, an event that usually takes place in early July.

On September 21, 2007, following sustained efforts to reduce light pollution in the region of Mont-Mégantic, it was recognized as the first international Dark-sky preserve by the International Dark-Sky Association.

Close to the scientific observatory is the Observatoire populaire du Mont-Mégantic (OPMM). Equipped with a telescope of a 61 cm (2 ft) diameter, it is one of the largest observatories in the world built for use by the public. It is operated by ASTROLab of the Mont-Mégantic National Park.

Five hundred feet below is the ASTROLab Mont-Mégantic National Park. ASTROLab is a museum and activity centre for public astronomy. There are exhibitions and a star cinema. At night, two public observatories, several telescopes and other observational instruments are available for public use.

== Sports ==
In addition to a network of over 50 km (31 mi) of hiking trails, the park also includes trails for cross country skiing, snowshoeing, and mountain biking.

Although rare, favorable wind conditions allow many hang gliders and paragliders to leap from the summit of Mount St. Joseph. Flight activities are supervised by the gliding club in Thetford Mines. The hang gliding altitude record in Quebec was set from the mountain in 2003. An altitude of 3,749 m (12,300 ft) was achieved by Marco Levasseur.

The ascent of Mont Mégantic by bike is probably the most difficult in Quebec as well as being the highest elevated road in the province. The elevated portions of the many kilometres give a good challenge to those who are facing it. The Tour de Beauce (formerly called the Grand Prix de Beauce) has been partly known in the international cycling world by its arrival at altitude. The organizers have taken to include the path to almost every edition of the event in the month of June.

== See also ==
- National Parks of Canada
