= La Patrie, Quebec =

La Patrie
- Municipality
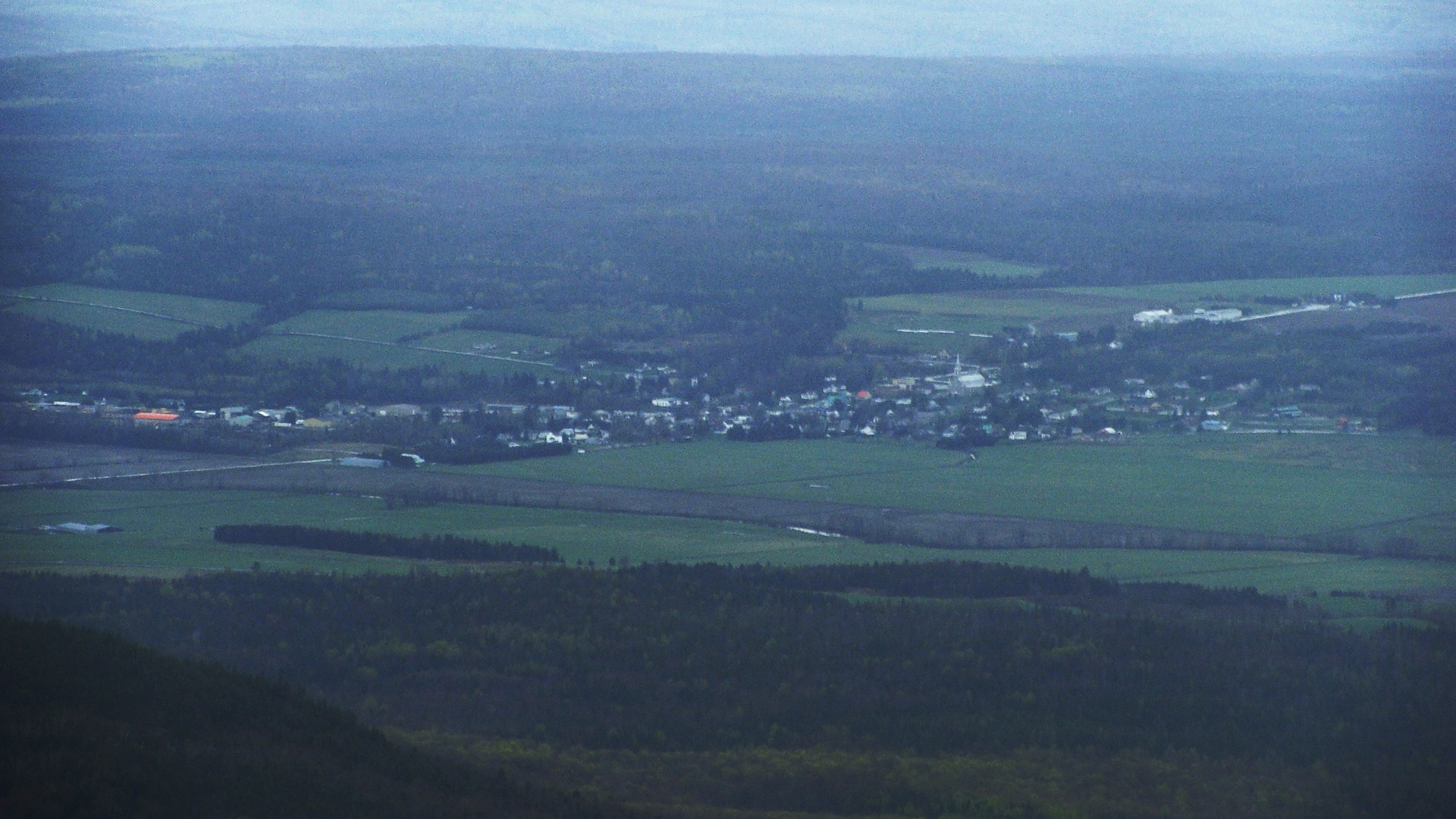
- La Patrie from Mont Mégantic

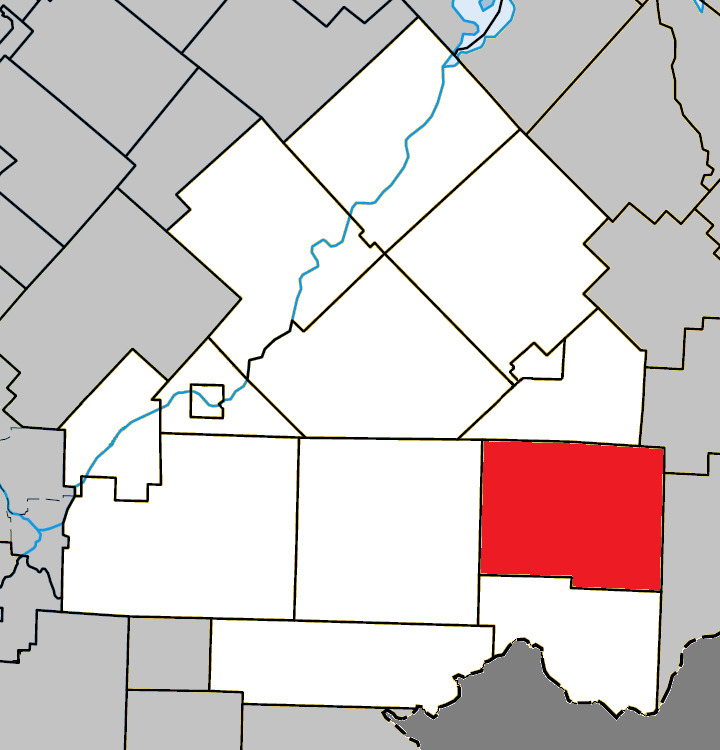
- Location within Le Haut-Saint-François RCM.

- Location in southern Quebec.
- Coordinates: 45°24′N 71°15′W
- Country: Canada
- Province: Quebec
- Region: Estrie
- RCM: Le Haut-Saint-François
- Constituted: December 24, 1997

Government
  - Mayor: Johanne Delage
  - Federal riding: Compton—Stanstead
  - Prov. riding: Mégantic

Area
  - Total: 206.70 km^{2} (79.81 sq mi)
  - Land: 204.61 km^{2} (79.00 sq mi)

Population (2021)
  - Total: 815
  - Density: 3.9/km^{2} (10/sq mi)
  - Pop 2016-2021: ▲4.8%
  - Dwellings: 425
- Time zone: UTC−5 (EST)
  - Summer (DST): UTC−4 (EDT)
- Postal code(s): J0B 1Y0
- Area code: 819
- Highways: R-212; R-257
- Website: www.lapatrie.ca

La Patrie (French pronunciation: [la patʁi]) is a municipality of about 815 people in Le Haut-Saint-François Regional County Municipality, in Quebec, Canada. It is located at the base of Mont Mégantic.

Some industries specializing in the field of forestry have settled in La Patrie. The company Guitabec, which produces guitars under the label Godin, has a manufacturing facility in La Patrie.

== History ==
Since the 2020s, La Patrie has participated in a program initiated and established by the Mont-Mégantic National Park in collaboration with Hydro-Québec, in which the municipality has greatly reduced its light pollution, which strongly affects the Mont Mégantic Observatory.
