= Mont Mégantic Observatory =

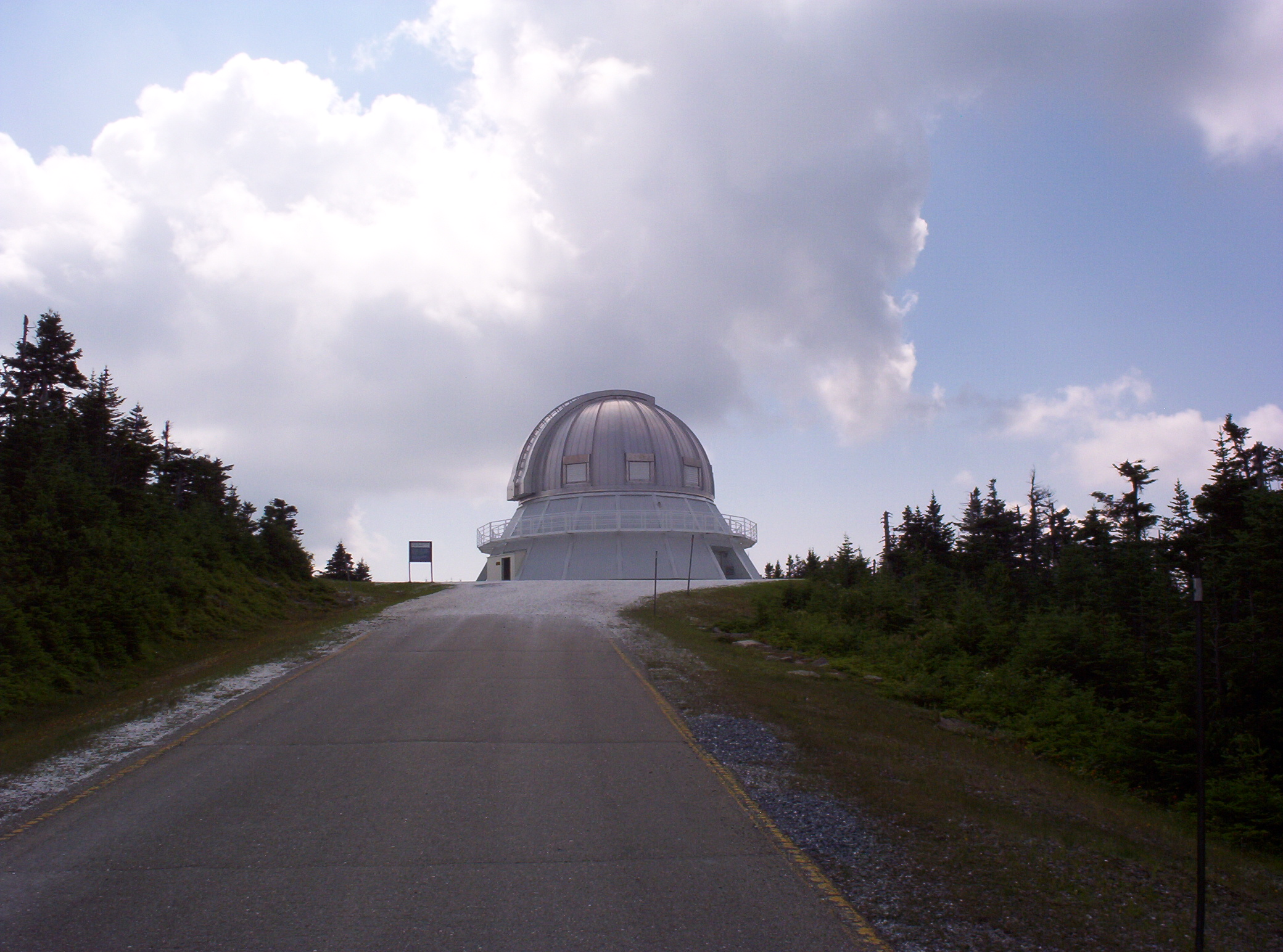
- Dome of OMM's 1.6 m telescope
- Alternative names: Mont Megantic Observatory
- Organization: UdeM, and ULaval
- Observatory code: 301
- Location: Notre-Dame-des-Bois, Québec
- Coordinates: 45.4558°N 71.1525°W
- Altitude: 1,111 metres (3,645 ft)
- Established: 1978
- Website: Observatoire du Mont-Mégantic

Telescopes
- unnamed telescope: 1.6m reflector
- Related media on Commons

The Mont Mégantic Observatory (French: Observatoire du Mont-Mégantic, pronounced [ɔpsɛʁvatwaʁ dy mɔ̃ meɡɑ̃tik]; OMM) is an astronomical observatory owned and operated jointly by the Université de Montréal (UdeM) and the Université Laval (ULaval). Founded in 1978, the observatory houses the second largest telescope in Eastern Canada after David Dunlap Observatory near Toronto. It is situated at the summit of Mont Mégantic, the highest point of Eastern Canada accessible by car. OMM is about 60 kilometres (37 mi) east of Sherbrooke and 190 kilometres (120 mi) east of Montreal.

The asteroid 4843 Mégantic is named for the observatory.

== Telescope ==
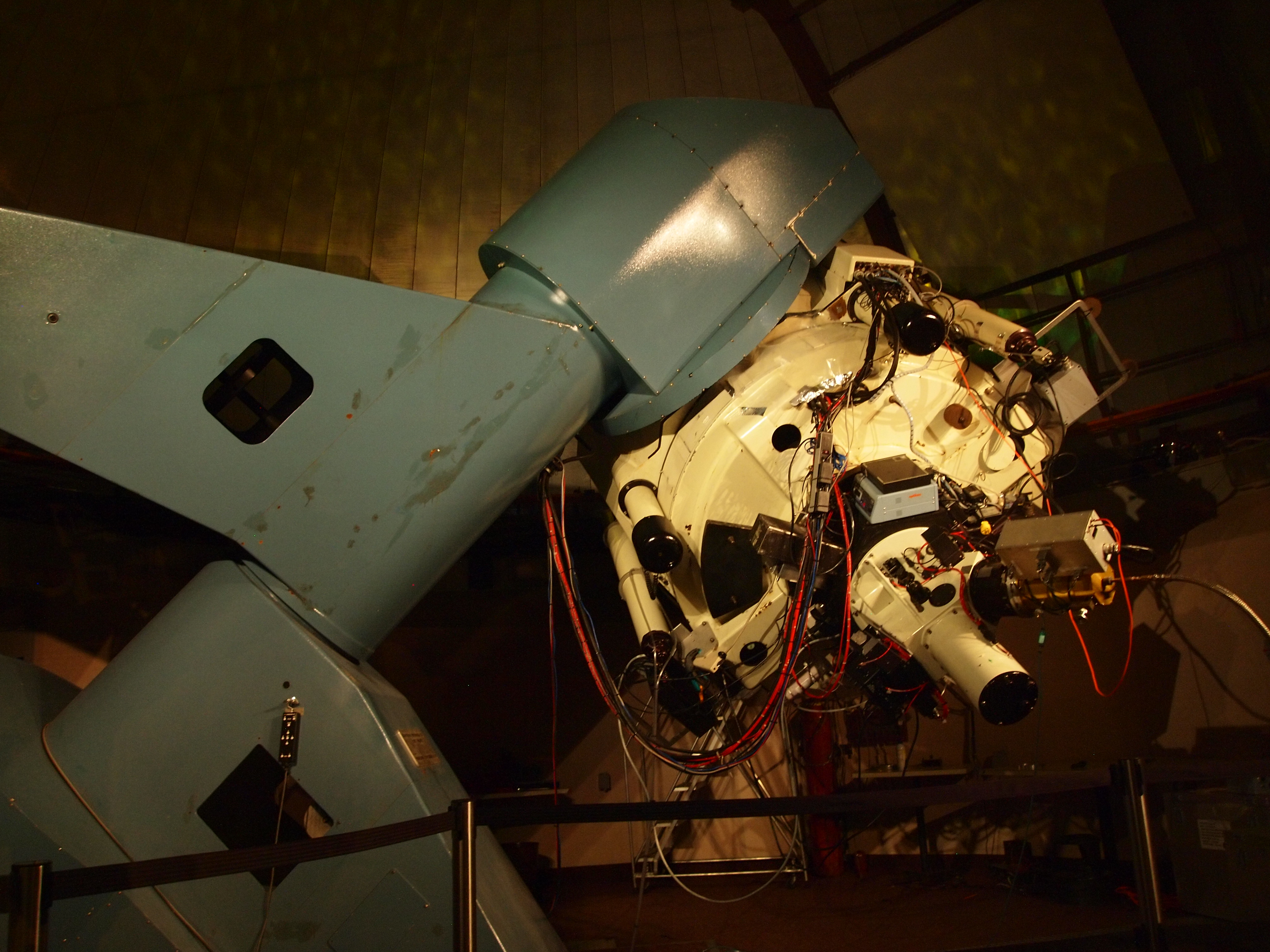
The 1.6 meter telescope inside Mt Megantic Observatory

The 1.6 metres (63 in) Ritchey-Chrétien telescope is equipped with a complement of modern instruments. Imaging, spectroscopy, and polarimetry are routinely conducted at both visible and infrared wavelengths.

== Light pollution ==
Efforts to control local light pollution, about one-quarter of which is due to the nearby city of Sherbrooke, have led to the establishment of the world's first International Dark-Sky Association (IDA) Dark Sky preserve around the observatory, covering some 5500 square km (2123 square miles).

== ASTROLab ==
ASTROLab is an astronomy activity centre operated by the Parc national du Mont-Mégantic. There are interactive displays about the history of the Universe, the Earth and life. Visitors can take guided daytime tours of ASTROLab and the Mount Megantic Observatory. There are also astronomy evenings, an astronomy festival, and the Perseid Festival.

== Solar eclipse of April 8th 2024 ==
The observatory was near the center path of totality of the solar eclipse of April 8, 2024.

== See also ==
- List of astronomical observatories
- List of largest optical reflecting telescopes
