= Mont Mégantic =

Monadnock in Montérégie, Quebec, Canada

Mont Mégantic Namesokanjik
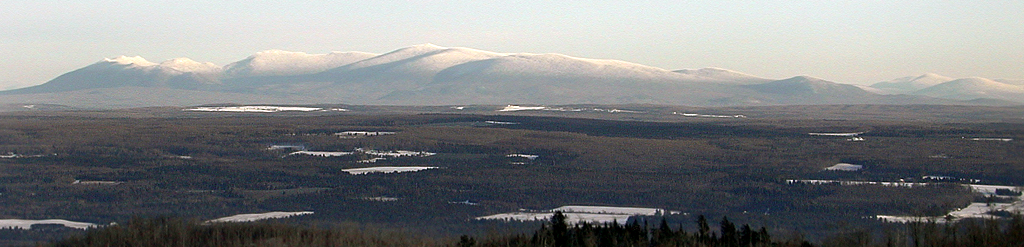
- Mont Mégantic from Stoke Mountains, 40 km to the west

Highest point
- Elevation: 1,110 m (3,640 ft)
- Prominence: 583 m (1,913 ft)
- Coordinates: 45°27′21″N 71°09′10″W

Geography
- Location: Québec, Canada
- Topo map: NTS 21E6 La Patrie

Geology
- Rock age: Early Cretaceous
- Mountain type: Intrusive stock

Mont Mégantic (French: [mɔ̃ megɑ̃tik]; Abenaki: Namesokanjik) is a monadnock located in Québec, Canada, about 15 km (9.3 mi) north of the border between Québec and the U.S. states of Maine and New Hampshire. Mégantic is on the border of the regional county municipalities of Le Granit and Le Haut-Saint-François. Its summit is the highest point of the latter. Many geologists believe that Mont Mégantic is a member of the Monteregian Hills formed by the New England hotspot, as it has the same mechanism and depth of intrusion.

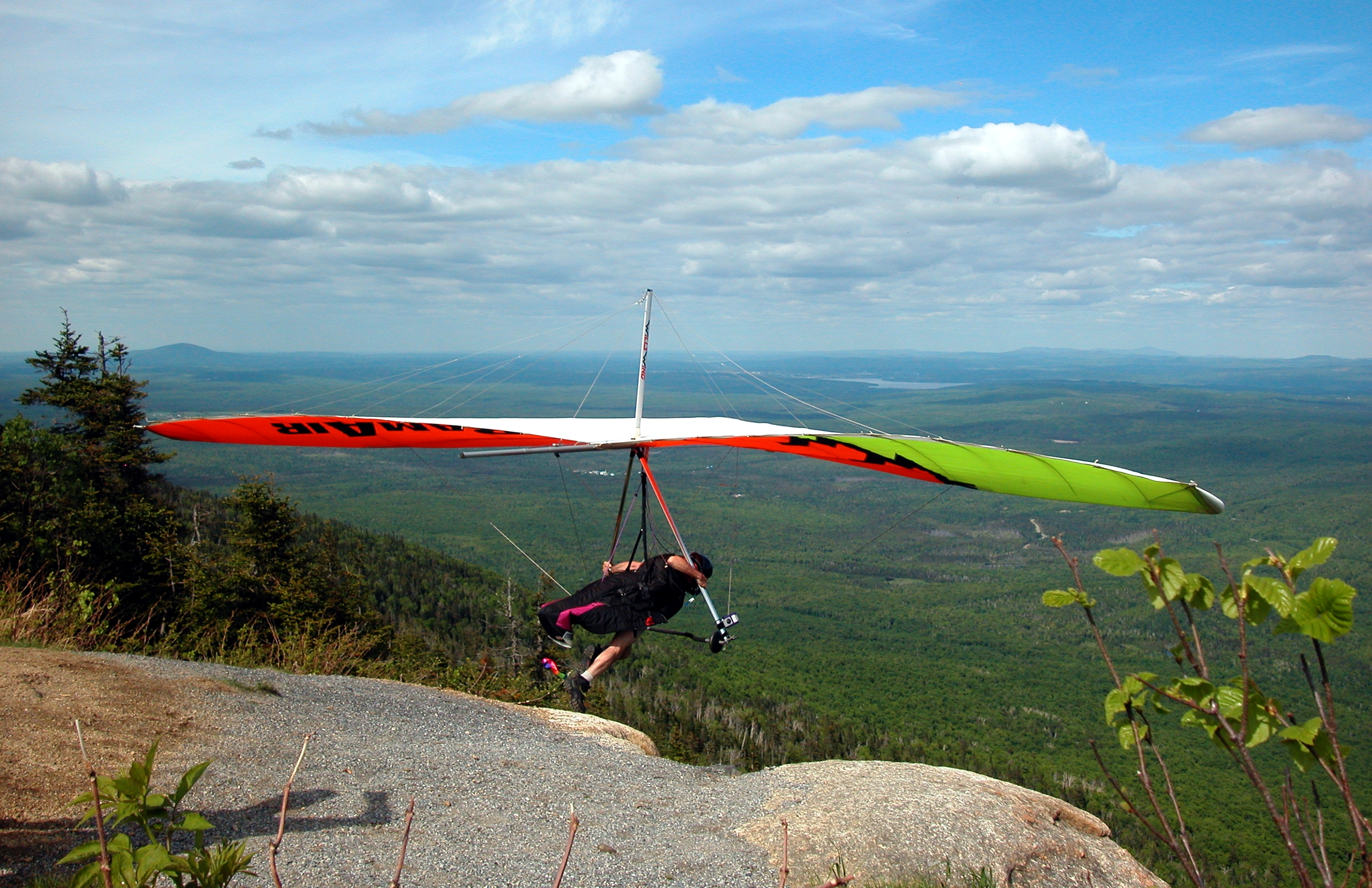
Hang gliding off Mégantic's Mont St.-Joseph subpeak

Mont Mégantic stands within the watershed of the Saint Lawrence River, which drains into the Gulf of Saint Lawrence. The east side of Mégantic drains into Rivière Victoria, thence into Lake Mégantic, the Chaudière River, and the St. Lawrence. The rest of Mégantic drains into Rivière Au Saumon (Salmon River), thence into the Saint-François River, and the St. Lawrence.

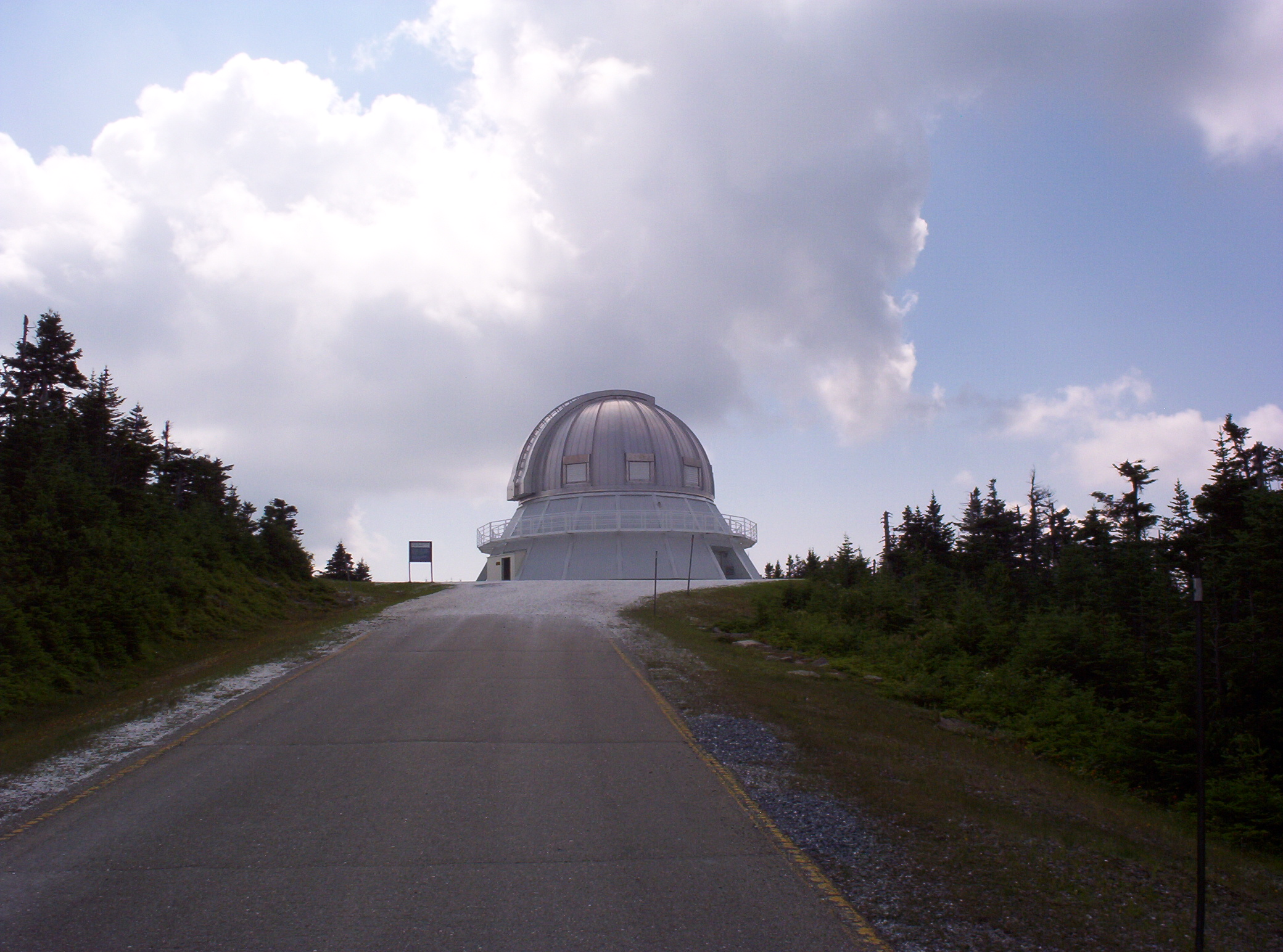
Dome of OMM's 1.6 m telescope

An observatory Observatoire du Mont Mégantic (OMM) is located on the mountain's summit, which is the highest point in Québec accessible by road. The mountain is in the middle of the 55 km^{2} (21 sq mi) Parc national du Mont-Mégantic. The annual Tour de Beauce bicycle race is routed over Mont Mégantic.
