= Newport River (North Eaton River tributary) =

River in Quebec (Canada)

- Location within Quebec
- Native name: Rivière Newport (French)

Location
- Country: Canada
- Province: Quebec
- Region: Estrie
- MRC: Le Haut-Saint-François Regional County Municipality
- Municipality: Newport and Cookshire-Eaton

Physical characteristics
- Source: Little unnamed lake
  - location: Newport
  - coordinates: 45.431282°N 71.559919°W
  - elevation: 316 m (1,037 ft)
- Mouth: North Eaton River
  - location: Cookshire-Eaton
  - coordinates: 45.39917°N 71.58083°W
  - elevation: 208 m (682 ft)
- Length: 10.8 km (6.7 mi)

Basin features
- Progression: Saint-François River, Saint Lawrence River
- Tributaries
  - left: (upstream)
  - right: (upstream)

The Newport River is a tributary of the North Eaton River whose current flows successively into the Eaton River, Saint-François River, then the Saint Lawrence River.

The Newport River flows through the municipalities of Newport and Cookshire-Eaton in the Le Haut-Saint-François Regional County Municipality (MRC), in the administrative region of Estrie, in Quebec, in Canada.

== Geography ==
The adjacent hydrographic slopes of the Newport River are:

- north side: Bury brook, Tambs brook, Brookbury brook, Saint-François River, Ditton West brook;
- east side: Sherman stream, Statton stream, rivière aux Saumons;
- south side: North Eaton River;
- west side: Pope stream, Eaton River.

The Newport River originates in the municipality of Bury, south of the village of Bury and north of the locality of Learned Plain.

From its source, the Newport River descends 10.8 kilometres (6.7 mi) south in the following segments:

- 1.6 kilometres (0.99 mi) southwesterly, to the municipal boundary between Newport and Cookshire-Eaton;
- 2.0 kilometres (1.2 mi) southwest, to Learned Plain Road;
- 6.4 kilometres (4.0 mi) southwest, to route 212;
- 0.8 kilometres (0.50 mi) towards the south, until its mouth.

The Newport River drains on the north bank of the North Eaton River at 0.6 kilometres (0.37 mi) downstream of the mouth of the latter and 2.9 kilometres (1.8 mi) upstream the confluence of the Sherman stream located at the boundary between the municipalities of Newport and Cookshire-Eaton.

== Toponymy ==
The toponym "Newport River" was formalized on December 5, 1968, at the Commission de toponymie du Québec.

== See also ==
- St. Lawrence River
- List of rivers of Quebec
