= Eaton River =

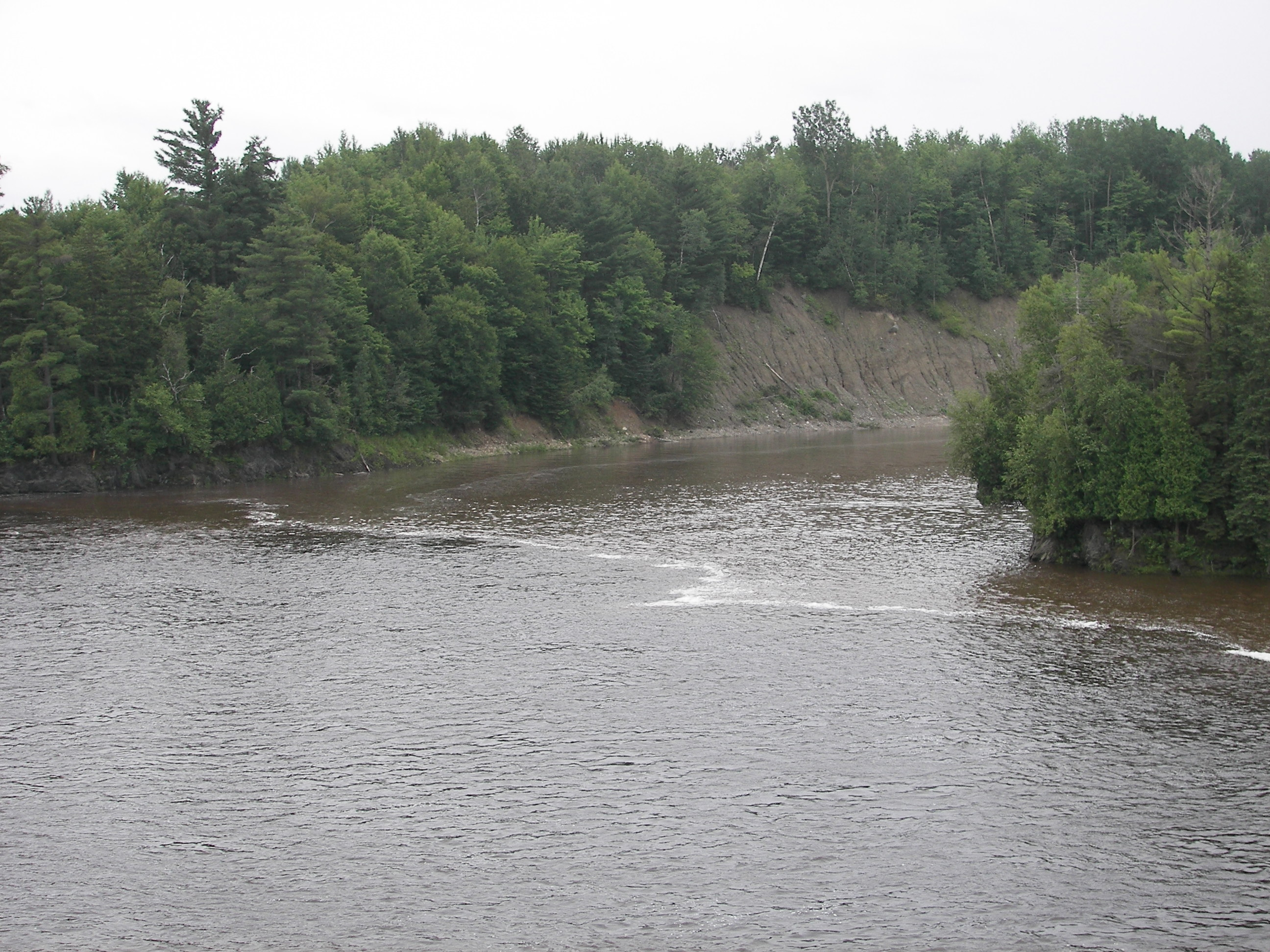
- Confluence of the Eaton river and the St-Francois river in East Angus.
- Native name: Rivière Eaton (French)

Location
- Country: Canada
- Province: Quebec
- Region: Estrie
- MRC: Le Haut-Saint-François Regional County Municipality
- Municipality: Saint-Isidore-d'Auckland, Newport, Sawyerville, Cookshire-Eaton, East Angus

Physical characteristics
- Source: Mountain streams near the border
  - location: Saint-Isidore-d'Auckland
  - coordinates: 45.235075°N 71.393139°W
  - elevation: 550 m (1,800 ft)
- Mouth: Saint-François River
  - location: East Angus - Parc des deux Rivières
  - coordinates: 45.472337°N 71.651670°W
  - elevation: 180 m (590 ft)
- Length: 43.5 km (27.0 mi)

Basin features
- Progression: Saint-François River, Saint Lawrence River
- Tributaries
  - left: (upstream) ruisseau des Pope, ruisseau Birchton, ruisseau Sawyer, ruisseau Saxland, Clifton River, Première Branche de la rivière Eaton, Deuxième Branche de la rivière Eaton, Cours d'eau Thivierge
  - right: (upstream) ruisseau Gendreau, ruisseau Gosselin, ruisseau Leclerc, Eaton North River, ruisseau Alder, cours d'eau Roy, ruisseau Chez Pérusse

The Eaton River is a tributary of the Saint-François River which is a sub-tributary of the Saint Lawrence River. The Eaton River successively crosses the municipalities of Saint-Isidore-d'Auckland, Newport, Sawyerville, Cookshire-Eaton and East Angus. These municipalities are located in the Le Haut-Saint-François Regional County Municipality (MRC), in the administrative region of Estrie, in the south of Quebec, in Canada.

== Geography ==
The main neighboring hydrographic slopes of the Eaton River are:

- North side: Saint-François River;
- East side: North Eaton River;
- South side: rivière aux Saumons (Massawippi River tributary);
- West side: Massawippi River, rivière aux Saumons (Massawippi River tributary), brook Stacey.

Many streams and different branches of the river originate near the crest of the northern White Mountains and meet on the flanks near the Quebec border and New Hampshire. Its watershed is 642 kilometres (398.92 mi) its drop is 396 metres (1,299 ft).

The small valley at the head of the Eaton River (located in Quebec) is a continuation of the valley of the "West Branch" of the Indian Stream flowing south into New Hampshire to go to discharge into the river Connecticut.

Course to Quebec from the border (segment of 19.9 kilometres (12.4 mi))

From ninth rang of Saint-Isidore-d'Auckland, on the border between Quebec and New Hampshire, the Eaton River flows north according to the following segments:

- 7.9 kilometres (4.9 mi) north-west, up to the confluence of the "first branch of the Eaton river" stream (coming from the south);
- 3.6 kilometres (2.2 mi) northwesterly, to the municipal boundary between Newport and Saint-Isidore-d'Auckland;
- 6.3 kilometres (3.9 mi) northwesterly, to the Parker road bridge, south of the hamlet of Randboro which is crossed by route 210;
- 2.1 kilometres (1.3 mi) westward to the confluence of the Clifton River (coming from the south).

Course of the river downstream of the Clifton River (segment of 11.7 kilometres (7.3 mi))

From the confluence of the Clifton River, the Eaton River flows over:

- 0.6 kilometres (0.37 mi) north-west, to the route 210 bridge;
- 1.9 kilometres (1.2 mi) north-west, to the bridge located north of the village of Sawyerville;
- 3.4 kilometres (2.1 mi) northwesterly, to the confluence of Sawyer Creek (coming from the southwest);
- 4.6 kilometres (2.9 mi) north, passing east of the hamlet of Eaton Corner, to the hamlet of Lake's Mill bridge (Flanders Road);
- 1.2 kilometres (0.75 mi) north to the confluence of the North Eaton River.

Course downstream of the North Eaton River (segment of 11.9 kilometres (7.4 mi))

From the confluence of the North Eaton River, the Eaton River flows over:

- 1.4 kilometres (0.87 mi) northwesterly, to the route 212 bridge;
- 2.3 kilometres (1.4 mi) northwesterly, crossing the village of Cookshire to the route 108 bridge;
- 8.2 kilometres (5.1 mi) north, crossing Lambert Pond, as well as the municipalities of Cookshire-Eaton, Westbury and East Angus, up to its mouth.

The mouth of the Eaton River empties on the south bank of the Saint-Francois River in a river loop bypassing the town of East Angus.

== Toponymy ==
The toponym "Eaton River" was made official on December 5, 1968, at the Commission de toponymie du Québec.

== See also ==
- St. Lawrence River
- List of rivers of Quebec
