= Rivière du Sud (North Eaton River tributary) =

River in Estrie, Quebec, Canada

- Location within Quebec

Location
- Country: Canada
- Province: Quebec
- Region: Estrie
- RCM: Le Haut-Saint-François Regional County Municipality
- Ville: Saint-Mathias-de-Bonneterre, Newport

Physical characteristics
- Source: Little unnamed lake near the Canada-US border
  - location: Saint-Mathias-de-Bonneterre
  - coordinates: 45.29103°N 71.34768°W
  - elevation: 520 m (1,710 ft)
- Mouth: North Eaton River
  - location: Newport
  - coordinates: 45.35544°N 71.36415°W
  - elevation: 330 m (1,080 ft)
- Length: 10.3 km (6.4 mi)

Basin features
- Progression: North Eaton River, Eaton River, rivière aux Saumons, Massawippi River, Saint-François River, Saint Lawrence River
- Tributaries
  - right: Ruisseau Poilu

The rivière du Sud (in English: South River) is a tributary of the south bank of the North Eaton River whose current flows successively into the Eaton River, the Saint-François River, then the south shore of the St. Lawrence River.

The Rivière du Sud flows through the municipalities of Saint-Mathias-de-Bonneterre and Newport, in the Le Haut-Saint-François Regional County Municipality (MRC), in the administrative region of Estrie, in Quebec, in Canada.

== Geography ==
The neighboring hydrographic slopes of the South River are:

- north side: North Eaton River, Ditton Creek West;
- east side: North Eaton River, Poilu Creek, Mining Creek;
- south side: Canada-US border;
- west side: Lyon stream, Eaton River, North Eaton River.

The South River takes its source from a small mountain lake surrounded by marshes. This lake is located in the eastern part of the municipality of Saint-Mathias-de-Bonneterre (almost at the limit of Chartierville). It is 0.8 kilometres (0.50 mi) northwest of the Canada-US border.

From its source, the South River descends on 10.3 kilometres (6.4 mi) towards the south entirely in a forest zone, with a drop of 190 metres (620 ft) according to the following segments:

- 4.3 kilometres (2.7 mi) first east along the border, then north, to route 210;
- 6.0 kilometres (3.7 mi) north-west, to its mouth. Note: A forest road runs along this segment.

The South River empties on the south bank of the North Eaton River at 1.9 kilometres (1.2 mi) upstream of the mouth of Christmas Creek (coming from the northwest).

== Toponymy ==
The toponym Rivière du Sud was formalized on December 5, 1968, at the Commission de toponymie du Québec.

== See also ==
- List of rivers of Quebec
