= Clifton River =

River in Estrie, Quebec, Canada

- Location within Quebec
- Native name: Rivière Clifton (French)

Location
- Country: Canada
- Province: Quebec
- Region: Estrie
- MRC: Le Haut-Saint-François Regional County Municipality
- Municipality: Saint-Malo, Saint-Isidore-de-Clifton and Newport

Physical characteristics
- Source: Mountain streams
  - location: Saint-Isidore-de-Clifton
  - coordinates: 45.211923°N 71.481333°W
  - elevation: 459 m (1,506 ft)
- Mouth: Saint-François River
  - location: Newport
  - coordinates: 45.33278°N 71.545°W
  - elevation: 260 m (850 ft)
- Length: 14.3 km (8.9 mi)

Basin features
- Progression: Saint-François River, Saint Lawrence River
- Tributaries
  - left: (upstream) ruisseau Saltworth
  - right: (upstream) ruisseau Alyre-Vallée, ruisseau du Moulin, ruisseau Chabot

The Clifton River is a tributary of the Eaton River, which flows into the Saint-François River which in turn flows on the south shore of the Saint-François River which in turn flows onto the south shore of the St. Lawrence River.

The Clifton River flows through the municipalities of Saint-Malo, Saint-Isidore-de-Clifton and Newport, in the Le Haut-Saint-François Regional County Municipality (MRC), in the administrative region of Estrie, in Quebec, in Canada.

== Geography ==
The neighboring hydrographic slopes of the Clifton River are:

- north side: Eaton River;
- east side: Eaton River;
- south side: Thompson stream;
- west side: Lajoie brook, Bobines brook, rivière aux Saumons (Massawippi River tributary).

The Clifton River originates in a small valley between two mountains (the northeastern one reaches 611 metres (2,005 ft); the southern one reaches 581 metres (1,906 ft)), near Auckland Road, in the Fifth Rang of canton of Auckland, east of the village of Saint-Malo, in Estrie.

From its source in the municipality of Saint-Malo, this river descends on 14.3 kilometres (8.9 mi) towards the north, according to the following segments:

- 5.0 kilometres (3.1 mi) northwesterly to the limit of the municipality of Saint-Isidore-de-Clifton;
- 3.9 kilometres (2.4 mi) north-west, passing west of the village of Saint-Malo, to the limit of the township municipality of Saint-Isidore-de-Clifton;
- 1.8 kilometres (1.1 mi) north-west, to the limit of the municipality of Newport;
- 3.6 kilometres (2.2 mi) north, up to its mouth.

The Clifton River empties on the south bank of the Eaton River on the east side of the village of Sawyerville, at 0.6 kilometres (0.37 mi) upstream of the bridge over the route 210, at 2.1 kilometres (1.3 mi) downstream of the Randboro hamlet bridge, approximately 25 kilometres (16 mi) east of Sherbrooke.

== Toponymy ==
The term "Clifton" is a family name of English origin.

The toponym "Clifton River" was formalized on December 5, 1968, at the Commission de toponymie du Québec.

== See also ==
- List of rivers of Quebec
