= Westbury =

Westbury may refer to:

== Places ==
=== United Kingdom ===
- Westbury, Buckinghamshire
- Westbury, Shropshire
- Westbury, Wiltshire
- Westbury-on-Severn, Gloucestershire
- Westbury-on-Trym, Bristol
- Westbury-sub-Mendip, Somerset

=== United States ===
- Westbury, Connecticut, a town in Litchfield County
- Westbury, New York, a village in Nassau County, New York on Long Island
  - Westbury station (LIRR), a station on the Long Island Rail Road's Main Line
- Westbury, Cayuga County, New York, a hamlet on the border of Cayuga and Wayne counties in New York
- Westbury, Houston, a neighborhood in Houston, Texas

=== Elsewhere ===
- Westbury, Tasmania, Australia
- Westbury, Quebec, Canada
- Westbury, suburb of Limerick, Ireland
- Westbury, Johannesburg, suburb of Johannesburg, South Africa

== Other ==
- Westbury (brand), a brand of clothing retailer C&A
- Westbury (surname), including a list of people with the name
- Westbury (housebuilder), British housebuilding company
- Westbury (UK Parliament constituency), former constituency in Wiltshire
- Westbury, model of guitar made by Univox

== See also ==
- Gwespyr, a village in Wales with the same etymology
- Baron Westbury, a title in the Peerage of the United Kingdom
- Westbury High School (disambiguation), several schools
- Westbury Park (disambiguation), several places
- Westbury Square (Houston)
