= North Eaton River =

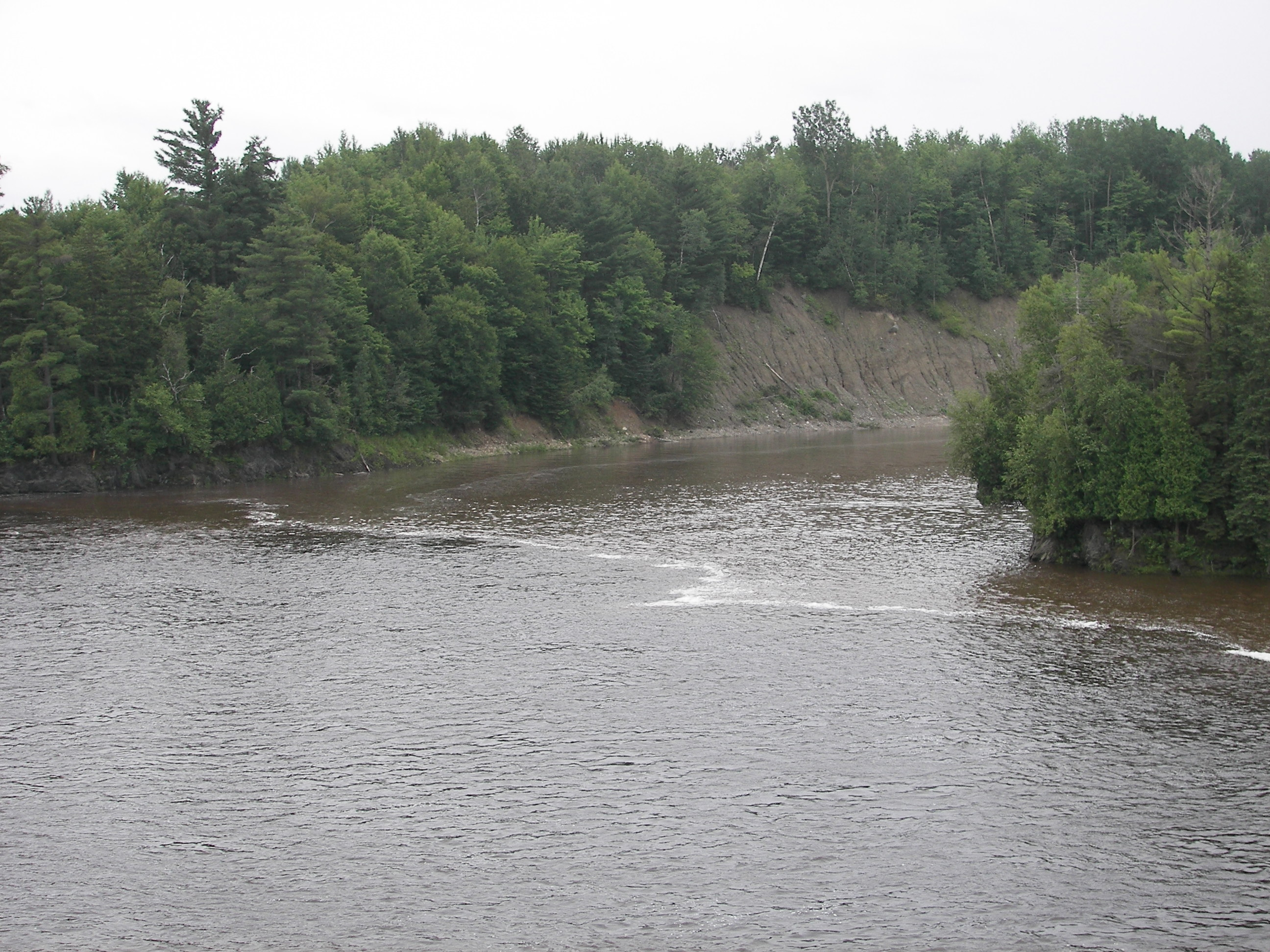
- North Eaton River near the New Mexico Road Bridge.

- Location within Quebec
- Native name: Rivière Eaton Nord (French)

Location
- Country: Canada
- Province: Quebec
- Region: Estrie
- MRC: Le Haut-Saint-François Regional County Municipality
- Municipality: La Patrie, Newport et de Cookshire-Eaton

Physical characteristics
- Source
  - location: Newport
  - coordinates: 45.382375°N 71.306238°W
  - elevation: 490 m (1,610 ft)
- Mouth: Saint-François River
  - location: Cookshire-Eaton
  - coordinates: 45.39861°N 71.58666°W
  - elevation: 208 m (682 ft)
- Length: 37.5 km (23.3 mi)

Basin features
- Progression: Saint-François River, Saint Lawrence River
- Tributaries
  - left: (upstream) ruisseau Lyon
  - right: (upstream) Newport River (North Eaton River), ruisseau Sherman, ruisseau Island, ruisseau au Pin, rivière du Sud (North Eaton River)

The North Eaton River (in French: Rivière Eaton Nord) is a tributary of the Eaton River, which flows into the Saint-Francois River which in turn flows to the south bank of the Saint Lawrence River. The North Eaton River flows through the municipalities of La Patrie, Newport and Cookshire-Eaton, in the Le Haut-Saint-François Regional County Municipality (MRC), in the administrative region of Estrie, in Quebec, in Canada.

== Geography ==
The neighboring hydrographic slopes of the North Eaton River are:

- north side: Newport River (North Eaton River), Pope Creek, Saint-François River, Ditton West Creek;
- east side: Ditton River, rivière aux Saumons (Massawippi River tributary);
- south side: Lyon stream, Eaton River, rivière du Sud (North Eaton River);
- west side: Eaton River.

The North Eaton River originates in the municipality of La Patrie, on the southern slope of Mount West Ditton (summit at 542 metres (1,778 ft)). This spring is located southwest of the village La Patrie, south of the hamlet of West Ditton, west of the rivière au Saumon (Le Haut-Saint-François).

From its source, the "North Eaton River" generally flows northwest over 37.5 kilometres (23.3 mi) in the following segments:

- 4.1 kilometres (2.5 mi) southeast into Township of Eaton;
- 8.3 kilometres (5.2 mi) westerly, to the confluence of the "South River" (coming from the south), located in Township of Newport;
- 1.8 kilometres (1.1 mi) northwesterly, up to the confluence of Ditton West brook (coming from the north);
- 3.0 kilometres (1.9 mi) towards the west, to the confluence of the Ruisseau au Pin (coming from the north);
- 6.4 kilometres (4.0 mi) west, to a road bridge, located north of the hamlet of New Mexico;
- 3.0 kilometres (1.9 mi) northwesterly to the confluence of Island Creek (coming from the north);
- 5.5 kilometres (3.4 mi) west, to a road bridge;
- 5.4 kilometres (3.4 mi) towards the north-west, to its mouth.

The North Eaton River drains on the east bank of the Eaton River at 1.2 kilometres (0.75 mi) downstream from the Lakes Mill Bridge and at 1.4 kilometres (0.87 mi) upstream from the bridge from route 212.

== Toponymy ==
The toponym "Rivière Eaton Nord" was made official on December 5, 1968, at the Commission de toponymie du Québec.

== See also ==
- List of rivers of Quebec
