= Saint-Isidore-de-Clifton =

- Municipality
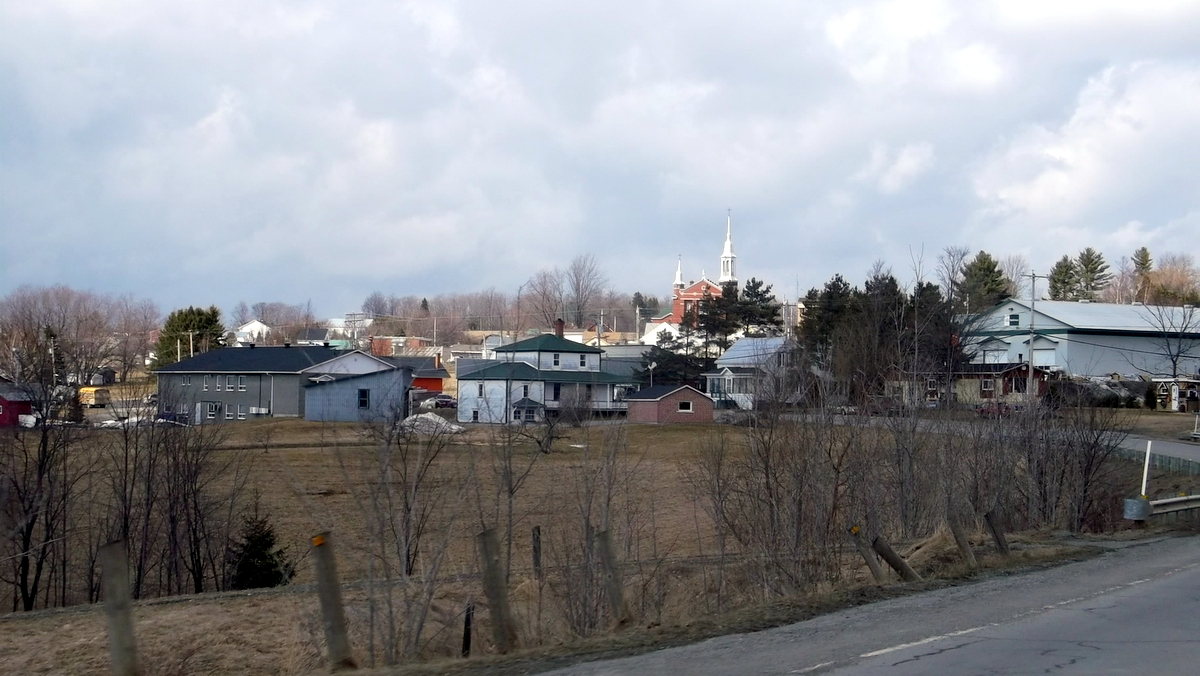

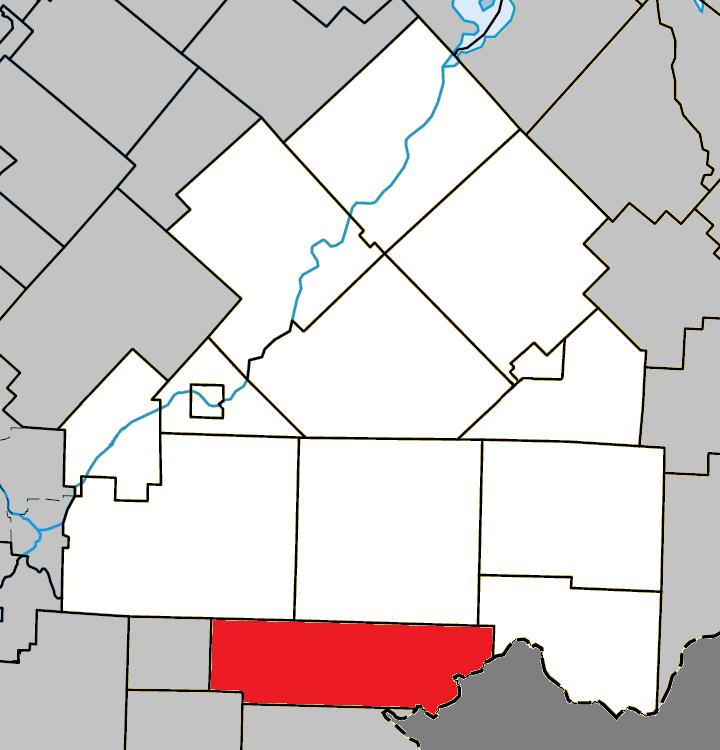
- Location within Le Haut-Saint-François RCM

- Location in southern Quebec
- Coordinates: 45.27°N 71.52°W
- Country: Canada
- Province: Quebec
- Region: Estrie
- RCM: Le Haut-Saint-François
- Constituted: December 24, 1997

Government
  - Mayor: André Perron
  - Federal riding: Compton—Stanstead
  - Prov. riding: Mégantic

Area
  - Total: 178.60 km^{2} (68.96 sq mi)
  - Land: 176.94 km^{2} (68.32 sq mi)

Population (2021)
  - Total: 673
  - Density: 3.8/km^{2} (9.8/sq mi)
  - Pop 2016-2021: ▼3.2%
  - Dwellings: 353
- Time zone: UTC−5 (EST)
  - Summer (DST): UTC−4 (EDT)
- Postal code(s): J0B 2X0
- Area code: 819
- Highways: R-210; R-253
- Website: www.st-isidore-clifton.qc.ca

Saint-Isidore-de-Clifton (French pronunciation: [sɛ̃t‿izidɔʁ də kliftən]) is a municipality of 700 people in Le Haut-Saint-François Regional County Municipality, in Quebec, Canada on the Canada–United States border. Saint-Isidore-de-Clifton is the source of the Eaton and Clifton rivers.

== History ==
=== Municipality of Saint-Isidore-d'Auckland ===
The earliest known name for Saint-Isidore-d'Auckland was the name of Popeville, formed from the surname of Pope which the surname of the president of the Cookshire branch of the Standard Chemical Company. Later the name of Saint-Isidore-d'Auckland was established, the Saint-Isidore part was chosen to honor Isidore of Seville who was bishop of Seville in 600. The Auckland part of the name was added in 1806 and probably comes from a toponym added by William Eden, 1st Baron Auckland after he was named man of state commissioner in North America in 1778 in order to settle border disputes following American independence. Saint-Isidore-d'Auckland was established canonically in 1904 with the foundation of the catholic parish of Saint-Isidore and was established civilly the year after. The post office was later established in 1911.

=== Municipality of Clifton-Partie-Est ===
the Municipality of Clifton-Partie-Est was named after the village of Clifton in Gloucestershire in 1799. Clifton is now a suburb of Bristol and the name of Bristol's of one of the city's thirty-five council wards. In 1873 the township of Clifton was subdivided into the municipality of the township of Clifton and the municipality of the east part of the township of Clifton (Clifton-Partie-Est).

=== Merger of the municipalities of Saint-Isidore-d'Auckland and Clifton-Partie-Est ===
Saint-Isidore-de-Clifton used to be two separate municipalities of the Municipalité de Saint-Isidore-d'Auckland and the Clifton-Partie-Est until they were merged into the Municipalité de Saint-Isidore-de-Clifton on the 24 December 1997. The name Clifton-Partie-Est is now used to refer to a part of Saint-Isidore-de-Clifton which corresponds to the old territory of Clifton-Partie-Est.

== Notable people ==
Jean Perron, former trainer of the Montreal Canadiens was born in Saint-Isidore d'Auckland before the merger of the two municipalities.
