= Quebec Route 253 =

Highway in Quebec, Canada

Route 253

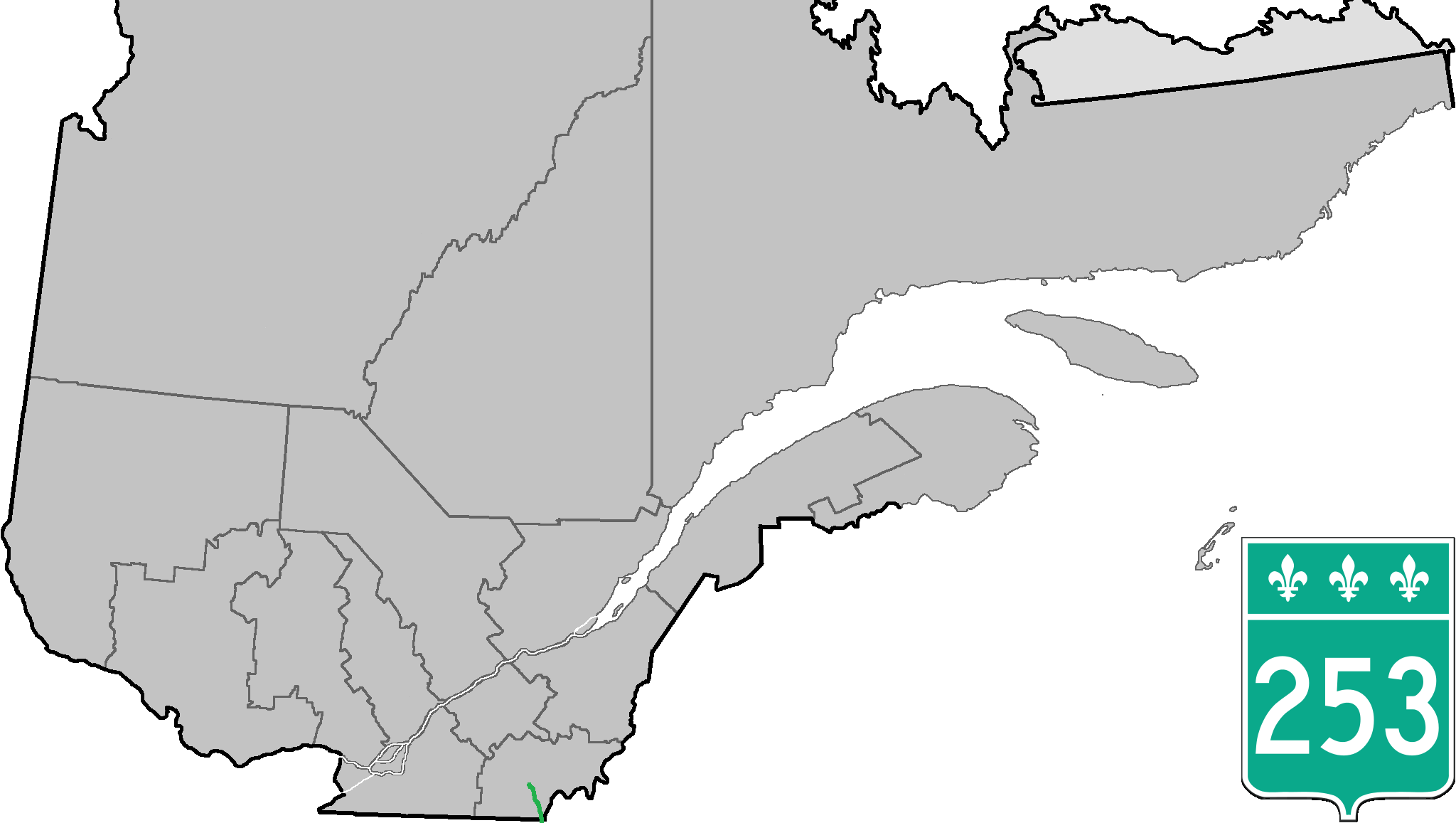

Route information
- Maintained by Transports Québec
- Length: 62.4 km (38.8 mi)

Major junctions
- South end: VT 253 at the U.S. border near East Hereford
- R-206 in Saint-Malo; R-108 / R-210 in Cookshire-Eaton
- North end: R-112 in East Angus

Location
- Country: Canada
- Province: Quebec

Highway system
- Quebec provincial highways; Autoroutes; List; Former
← R-251	→ R-255

Route 253 is a north–south highway on the south shore of the St. Lawrence River. Its northern terminus is in East Angus at Route 112 and its southern terminus is at the Vermont border, where it becomes Vermont Route 253.

== Municipalities along Route 253 ==
- East Hereford
- Saint-Venant-de-Paquette
- Saint-Malo
- Saint-Isidore-de-Clifton
- Cookshire-Eaton
- Westbury
- East Angus
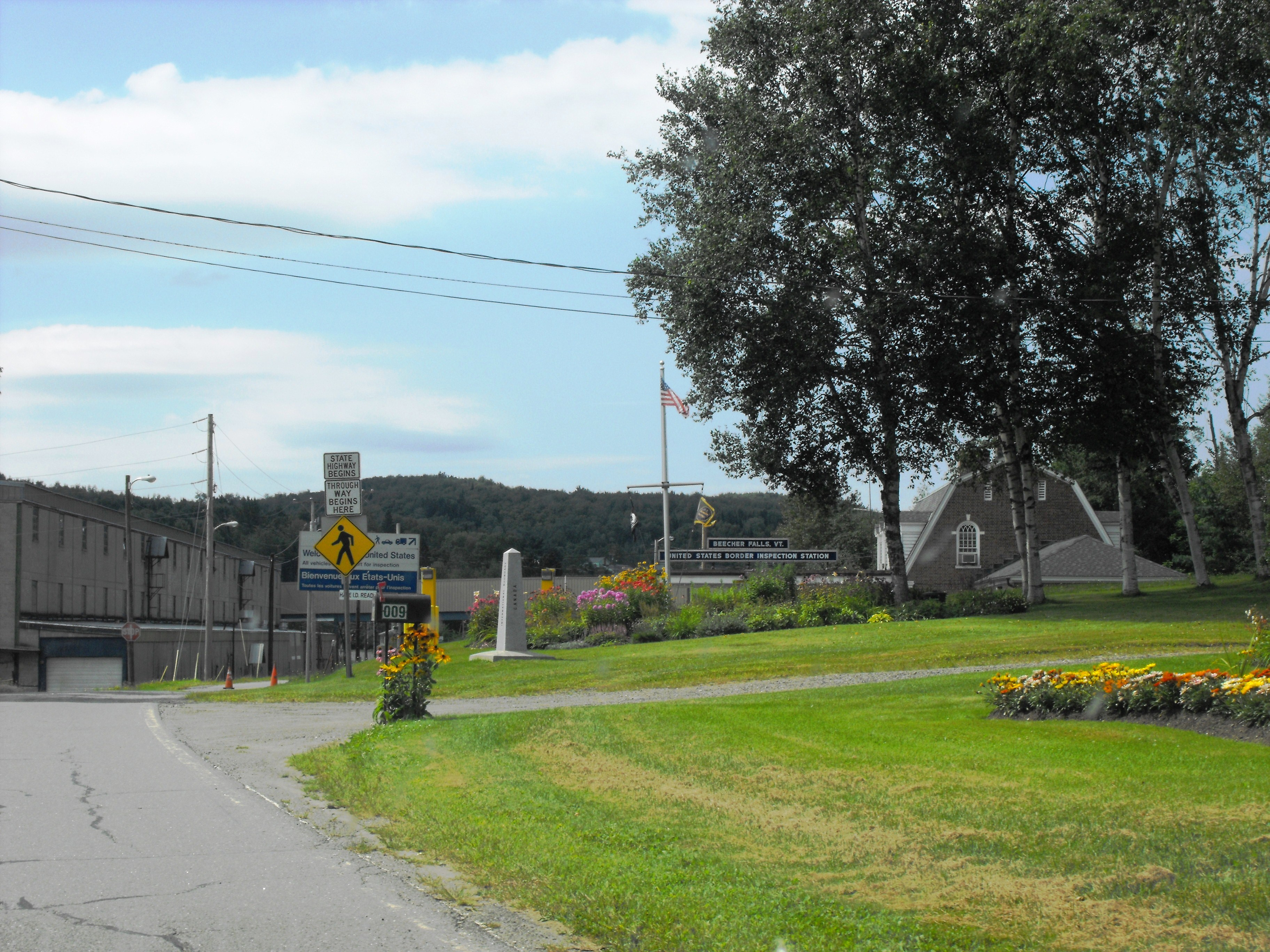
Route 253 southern end at the Canada-US border.

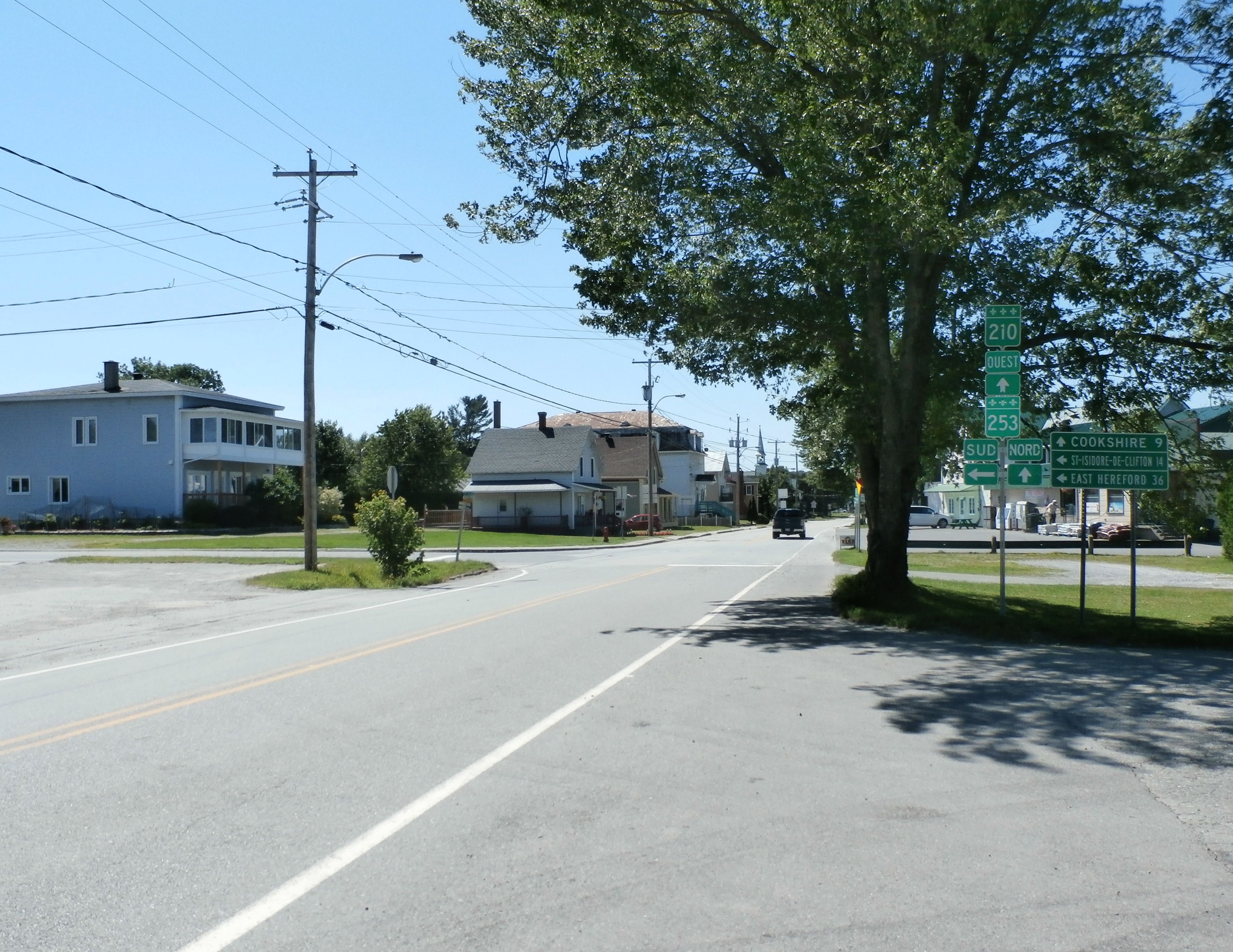
Junction of Routes 210 and 253 in Sawyerville.

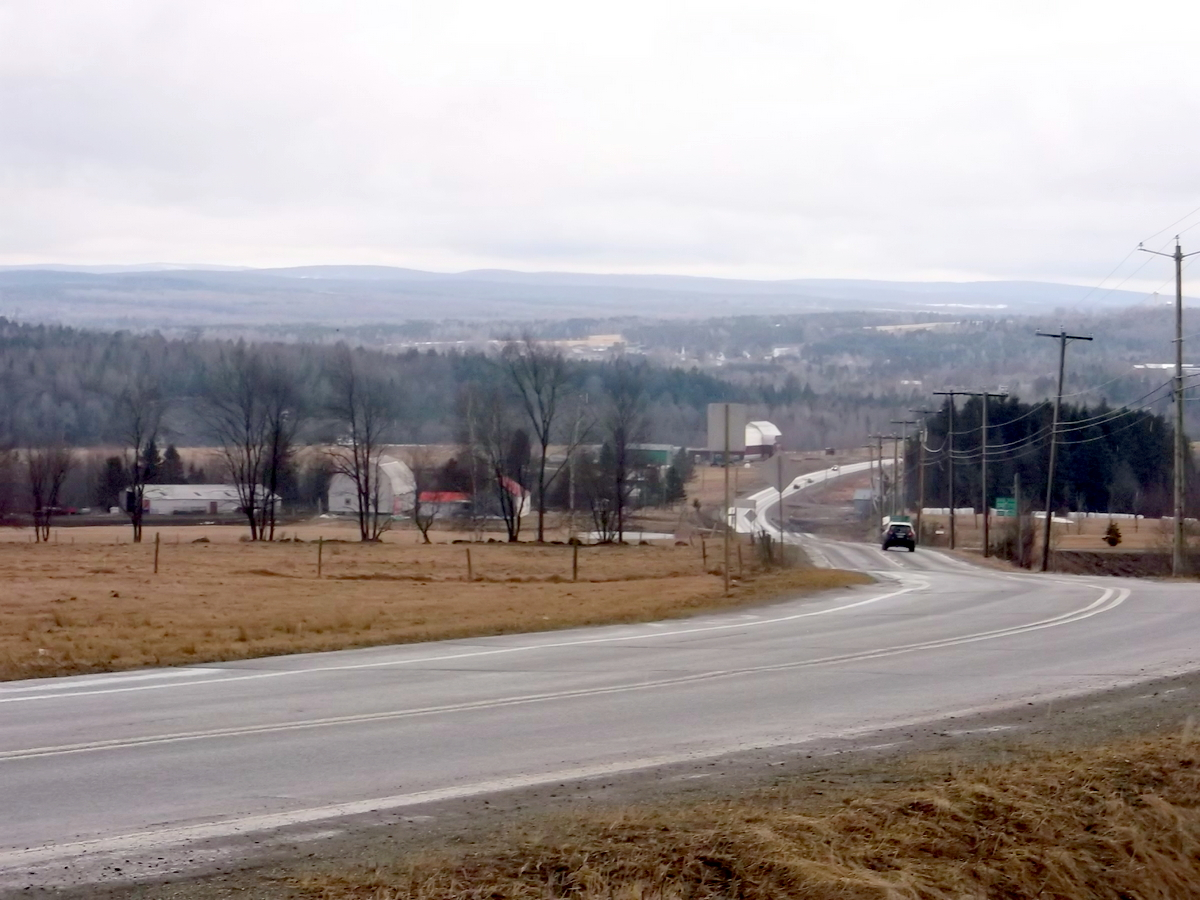
Eaton-Sawyerville Road (Routes 210 and 253) near Eaton.

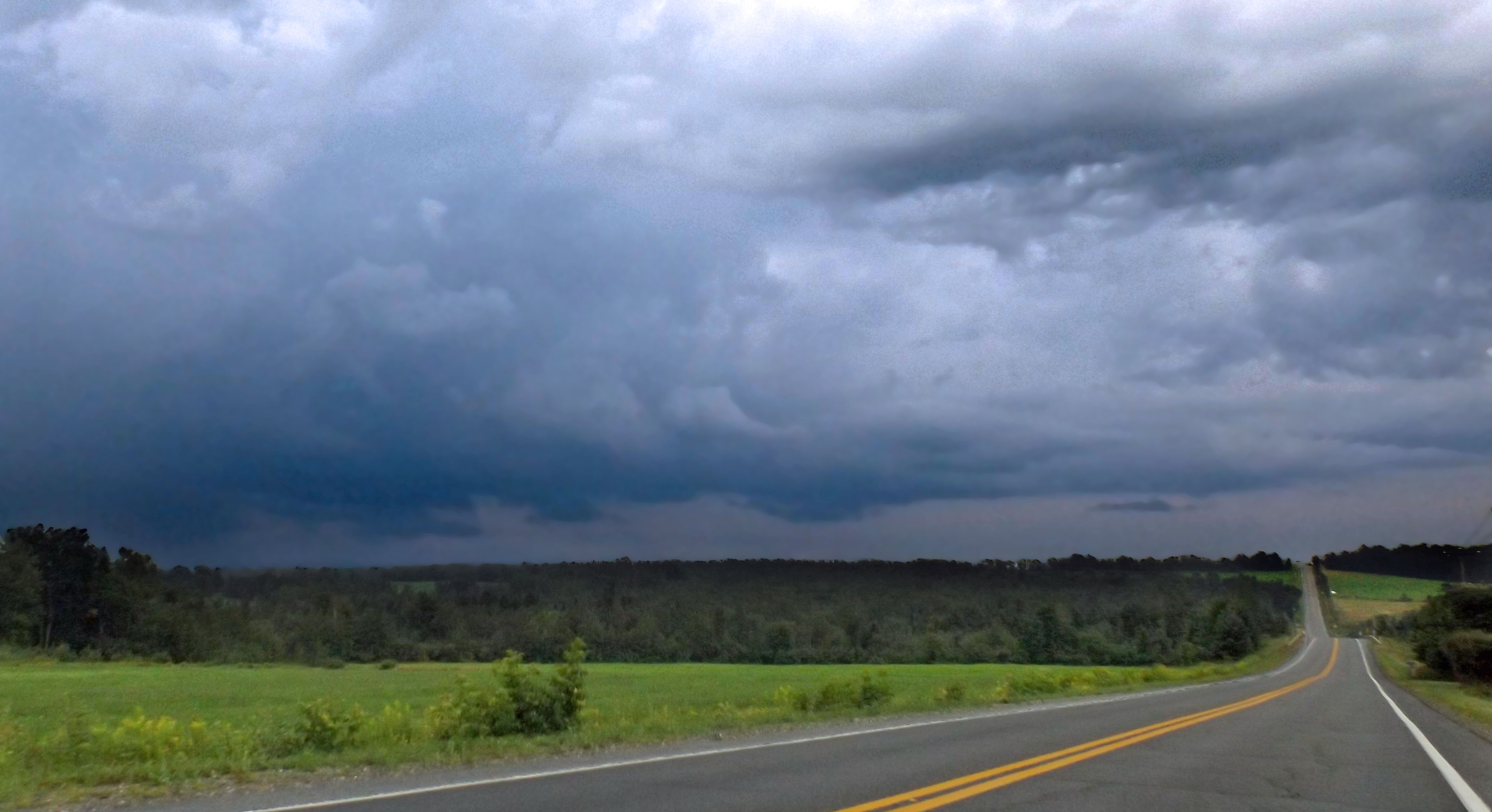
Route 253 near Cookshire.

== See also ==
- List of Quebec provincial highways
