= Westbury High School =

Westbury High School can refer to:

- Westbury High School (Houston) in Houston, Texas, United States
- Westbury High School (Old Westbury, New York) in Old Westbury, New York, United States
- Westbury High School (South Africa) in Johannesburg, South Africa
