= Westbury Park =

Westbury Park may refer to:

- Westbury Park, Bristol, England
- Westbury Park, a public park in Westbury, Houston, Texas, U.S.

== See also ==
- Westbury (disambiguation)
