= Saint-Herménégilde =

- Municipality
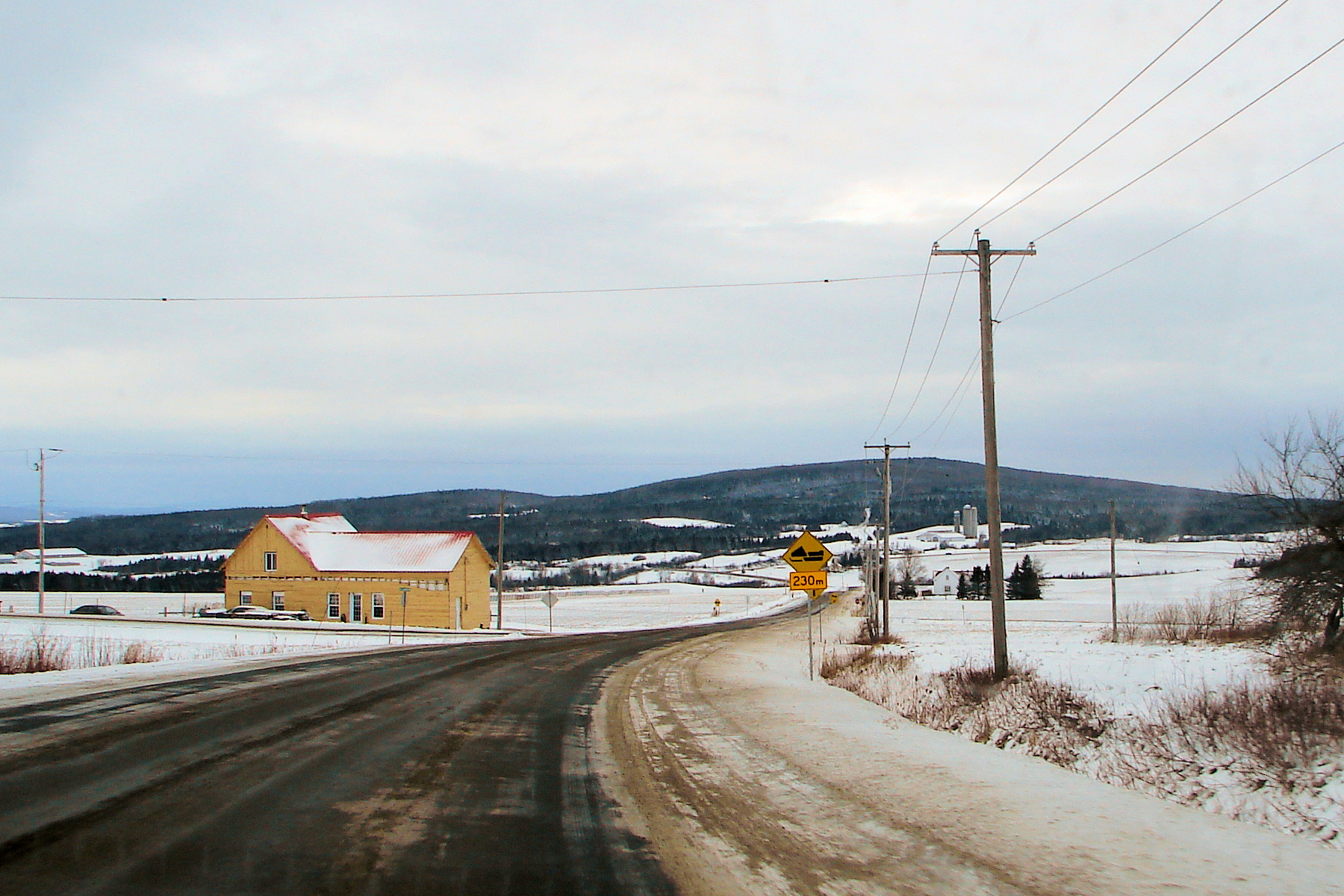

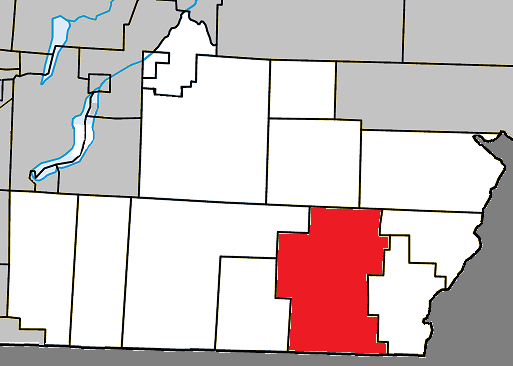
- Location within Coaticook RCM.

- Location in southern Quebec.
- Coordinates: 45°06′N 71°40′W
- Country: Canada
- Province: Quebec
- Region: Estrie
- RCM: Coaticook
- Constituted: October 12, 1985

Government
  - Mayor: Lucie Tremblay
  - Federal riding: Compton—Stanstead
  - Prov. riding: Saint-François

Area
  - Total: 168.80 km^{2} (65.17 sq mi)
  - Land: 166.42 km^{2} (64.26 sq mi)

Population (2016)
  - Total: 670
  - Density: 4/km^{2} (10/sq mi)
  - Pop 2011-2016: ▼4.6%
  - Dwellings: 554
- Time zone: UTC−5 (EST)
  - Summer (DST): UTC−4 (EDT)
- Postal code(s): J0B 2W0
- Area code: 819
- Highways: R-141; R-251
- Website: www.st-hermenegilde.qc.ca

Saint-Herménégilde (French pronunciation: [sɛ̃t‿ɛʁmeneʒild]) is a municipality in Quebec.

== Demographics ==
=== Population ===
Population trend:

Census	Population	Change (%)
2016	670	▼4.6%
2011	702	▼2.2%
2006	718	▲20.7%
2001	595	▼3.4%
1996	616	▲7.1%
1991	575	N/A

== See also ==
- List of anglophone communities in Quebec
