= Westbury, Quebec =

Westbury
- Township municipality
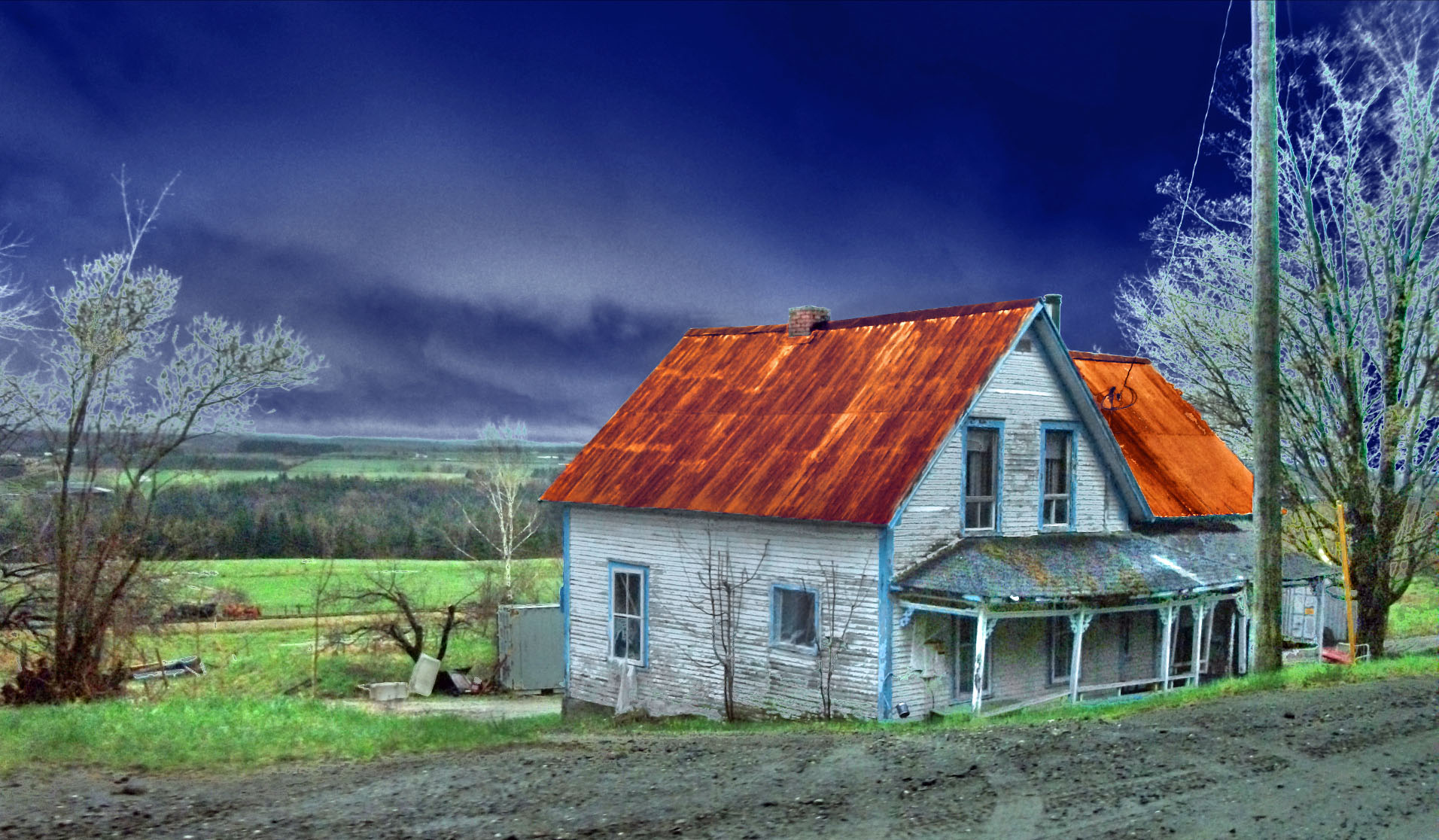
- Old house in Westbury

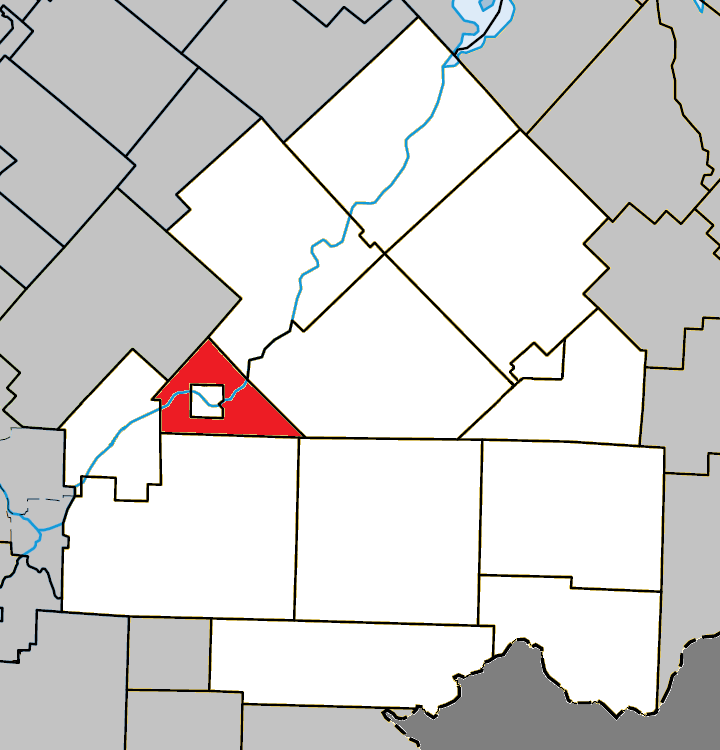
- Location within Le Haut-Saint-François RCM

- Location in southern Quebec
- Coordinates: 45.5°N 71.67°W
- Country: Canada
- Province: Quebec
- Region: Estrie
- RCM: Le Haut-Saint-François
- Constituted: August 16, 1858

Government
  - Mayor: Gray Forster
  - Federal riding: Compton—Stanstead
  - Prov. riding: Mégantic

Area
  - Total: 57.30 km^{2} (22.12 sq mi)
  - Land: 55.61 km^{2} (21.47 sq mi)

Population (2021)
  - Total: 1,097
  - Density: 19.7/km^{2} (51/sq mi)
  - Pop 2016-2021: ▲9%
- Time zone: UTC−5 (EST)
  - Summer (DST): UTC−4 (EDT)
- Postal code(s): J0B 1R0
- Area code: 819
- Highways: R-108; R-112; R-214; R-253
- Website: www.cantonwestbury.com

Westbury is a township municipality in Le Haut-Saint-François Regional County Municipality, in Quebec, Canada. It surrounds the city of East Angus.

The township had a population of 1,097 in the Canada 2021 Census.

== Demographics ==
In the 2021 Census of Population conducted by Statistics Canada, Westbury had a population of 1,097 living in 424 of its 440 total private dwellings, a change of 9% from its 2016 population of 1,006. With a land area of 55.61 km^{2} (21.47 sq mi), it had a population density of 19.7/km^{2} (51.1/sq mi) in 2021.
