= Quebec Route 251 =

Highway in Quebec, Canada

Route 251

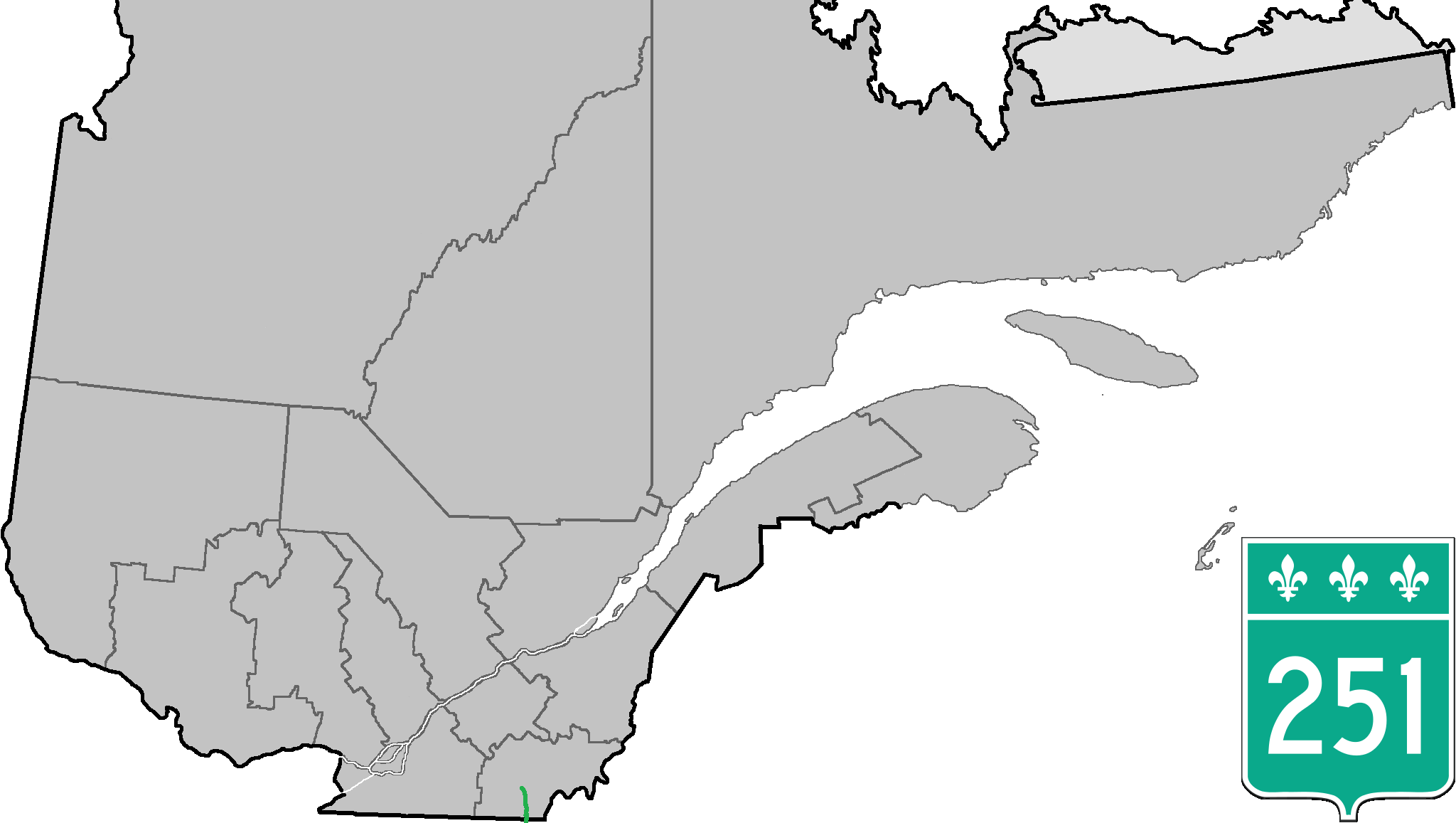

Route information
- Maintained by Transports Québec
- Length: 38.5 km (23.9 mi)

Major junctions
- South end: R-141 in Saint-Herménégilde
- R-206 in Sainte-Edwidge-de-Clifton; R-208 in Martinville
- North end: R-108 in Cookshire-Eaton

Location
- Country: Canada
- Province: Quebec
- Major cities: Martinville

Highway system
- Quebec provincial highways; Autoroutes; List; Former
← R-249	→ R-253

Route 251 is a north–south highway on the south shore of the St. Lawrence River. Its northern terminus is at Route 108 in Cookshire-Eaton, and its southern terminus is at Route 141, in Saint-Herménégilde.

== Municipalities along Route 251 ==
- Saint-Herménégilde
- Sainte-Edwidge-de-Clifton
- Martinville
- Cookshire-Eaton
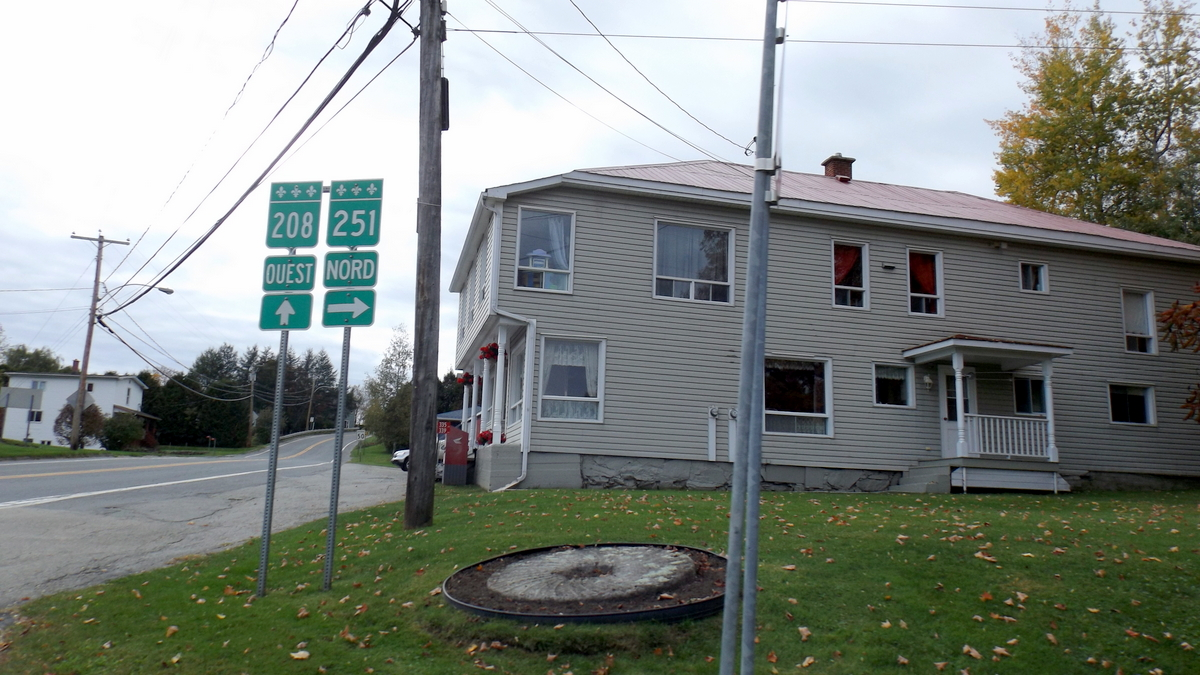
Junction of Route 208 with Route 251 in Martinville.

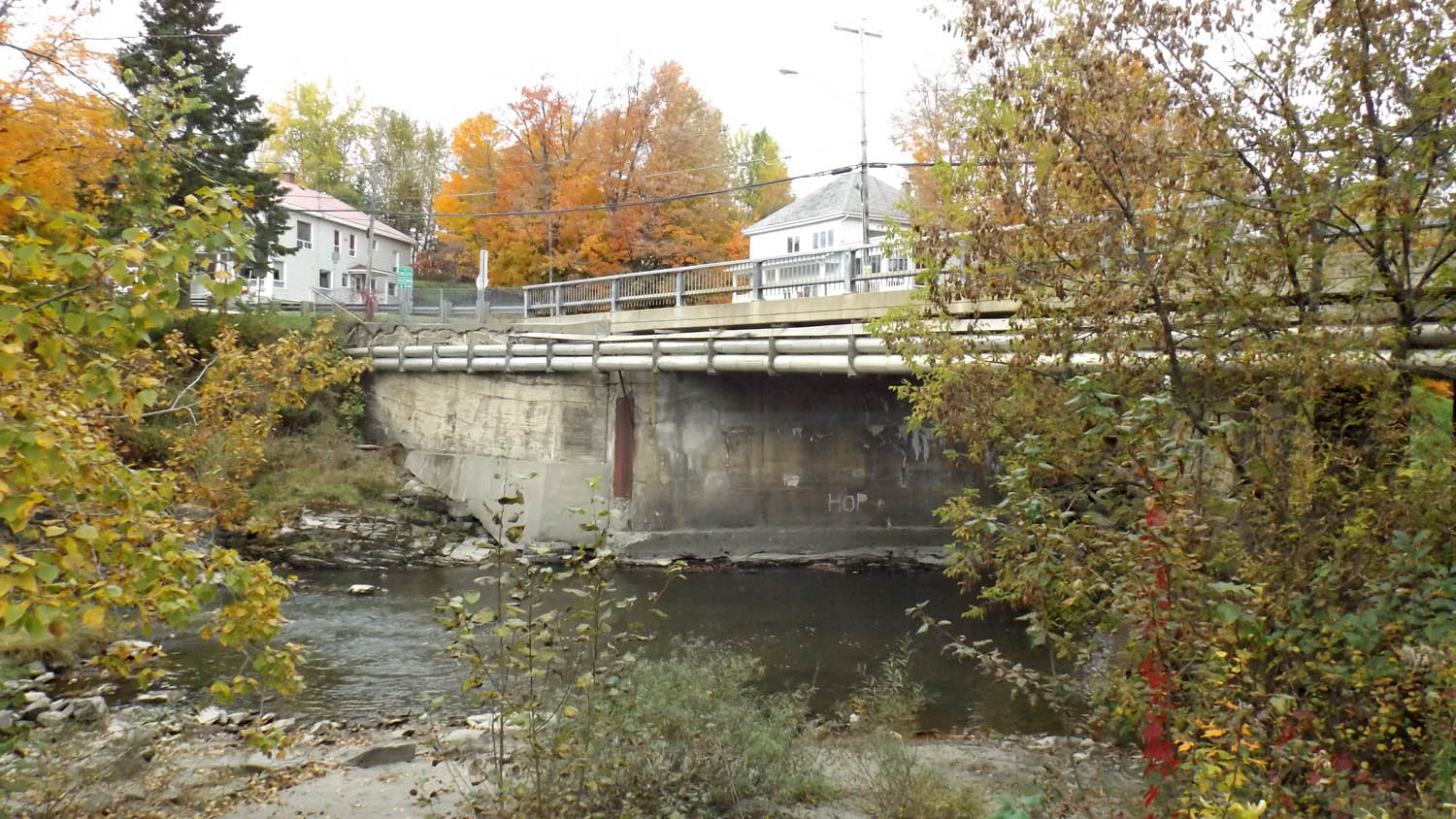
Bridge over Saumons River.

== See also ==
- List of Quebec provincial highways
