= Hampden, Quebec =

Hampden
- Township municipality
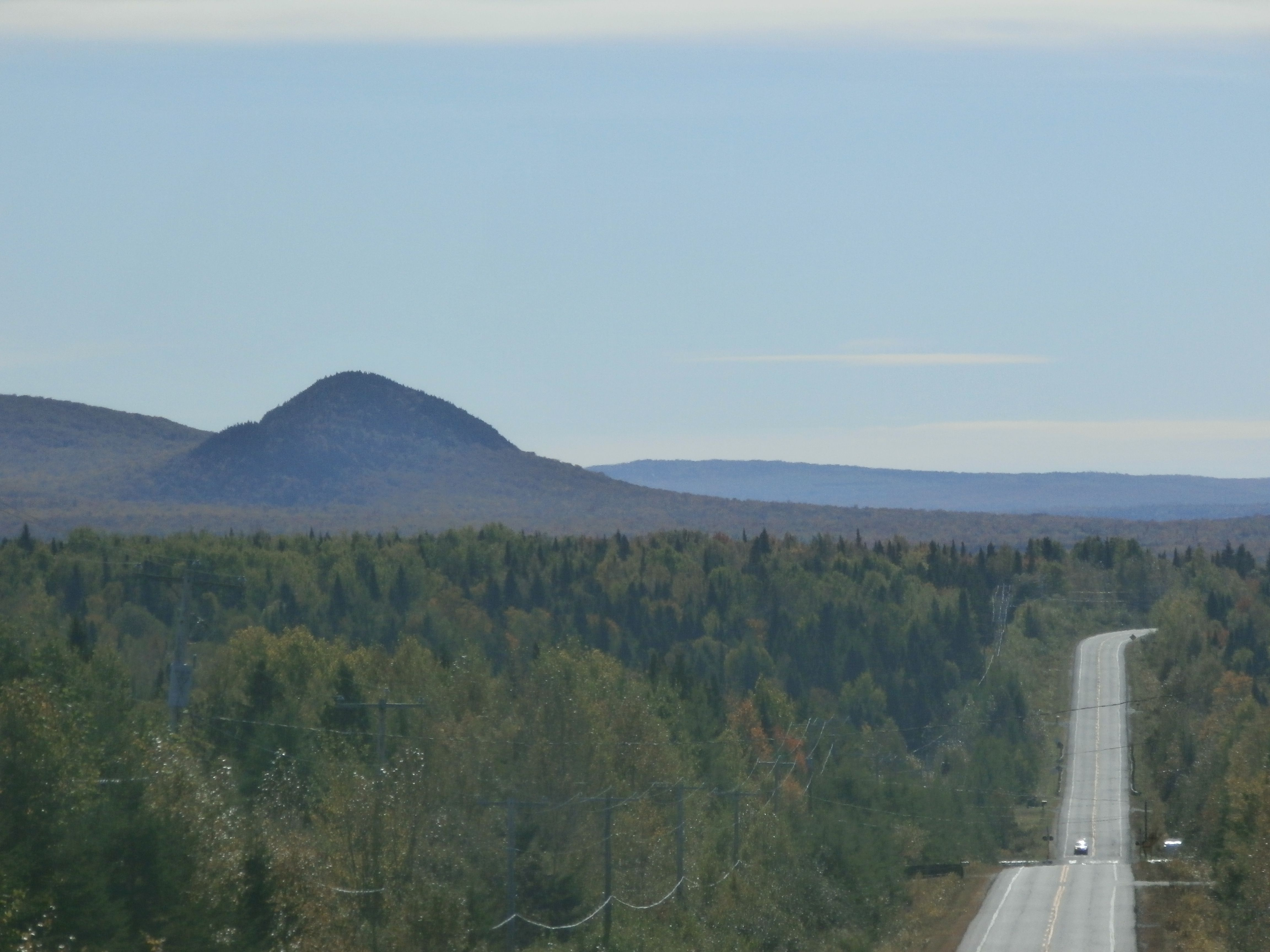
- Pain de Sucre

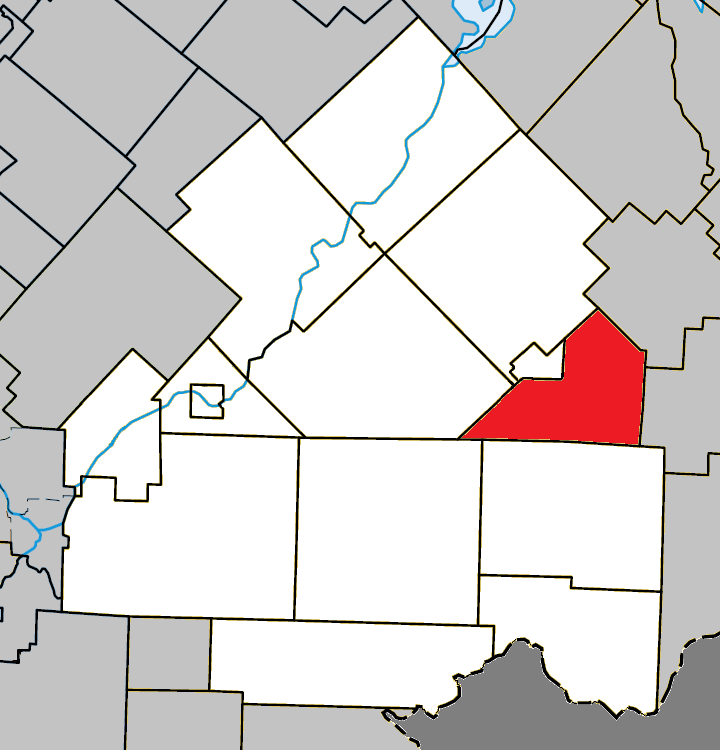
- Location within Le Haut-Saint-François RCM

- Location in southern Quebec
- Coordinates: 45.5°N 71.25°W
- Country: Canada
- Province: Quebec
- Region: Estrie
- RCM: Le Haut-Saint-François
- Constituted: January 1, 1874

Government
  - Mayor: Bertrand Prévost
  - Federal riding: Compton—Stanstead
  - Prov. riding: Mégantic

Area
  - Total: 111.80 km^{2} (43.17 sq mi)
  - Land: 111.68 km^{2} (43.12 sq mi)

Population (2021)
  - Total: 193
  - Density: 1.7/km^{2} (4.4/sq mi)
  - Pop 2016-2021: ▲9.7%
  - Dwellings: 114
- Time zone: UTC−5 (EST)
  - Summer (DST): UTC−4 (EDT)
- Postal code(s): J0B 1Y0
- Area code: 819
- Highways: R-214; R-257
- Website: www.cantonhampden.com

Hampden is a township municipality of about 200 people in Le Haut-Saint-François Regional County Municipality, in the Estrie region of Quebec, Canada.

== Demographics ==
In the 2021 Census of Population conducted by Statistics Canada, Hampden had a population of 193 living in 87 of its 114 total private dwellings, a change of 9.7% from its 2016 population of 176. With a land area of 111.68 km^{2} (43.12 sq mi), it had a population density of 1.7/km^{2} (4.5/sq mi) in 2021.

Canada census – Hampden community profile

	2021	2016	2011
Population	193 (+9.7% from 2016)	176 (-17.8% from 2011)	214 (+2.4% from 2006)
Land area	111.68 km^{2} (43.12 sq mi)	111.88 km^{2} (43.20 sq mi)	112.70 km^{2} (43.51 sq mi)
Population density	1.7/km^{2} (4.4/sq mi)	1.6/km^{2} (4.1/sq mi)	1.9/km^{2} (4.9/sq mi)
Median age	49.2 (M: 48.4, F: 52.8)	50.2 (M: 49.0, F: 50.2)	43.7 (M: 41.3, F: 44.5)
Private dwellings	114 (total)	104 (total)	94 (total)
Median household income	$.N/A	$.N/A	$.N/A

Notes: Income data for this area has been suppressed for data quality or confidentiality reasons.
References: 2021 2016 2011

Historical census populations – Hampden

Year	Pop.	±%
1881	547	—
1891	1,066	+94.9%
1901	390	−63.4%
1911	373	−4.4%
1921	333	−10.7%
1931	389	+16.8%
1941	429	+10.3%
1951	392	−8.6%
1956	390	−0.5%
1961	277	−29.0%
1966	194	−30.0%

Year	Pop.	±%
1971	156	−19.6%
1976	131	−16.0%
1981	125	−4.6%
1986	120	−4.0%
1991	137	+14.2%
1996	153	+11.7%
2001	167	+9.2%
2006	209	+25.1%
2011	214	+2.4%
2016	176	−17.8%
2021	193	+9.7%

Source: Statistics Canada
