= Quebec Route 210 =

Highway in Quebec, Canada

Route 210

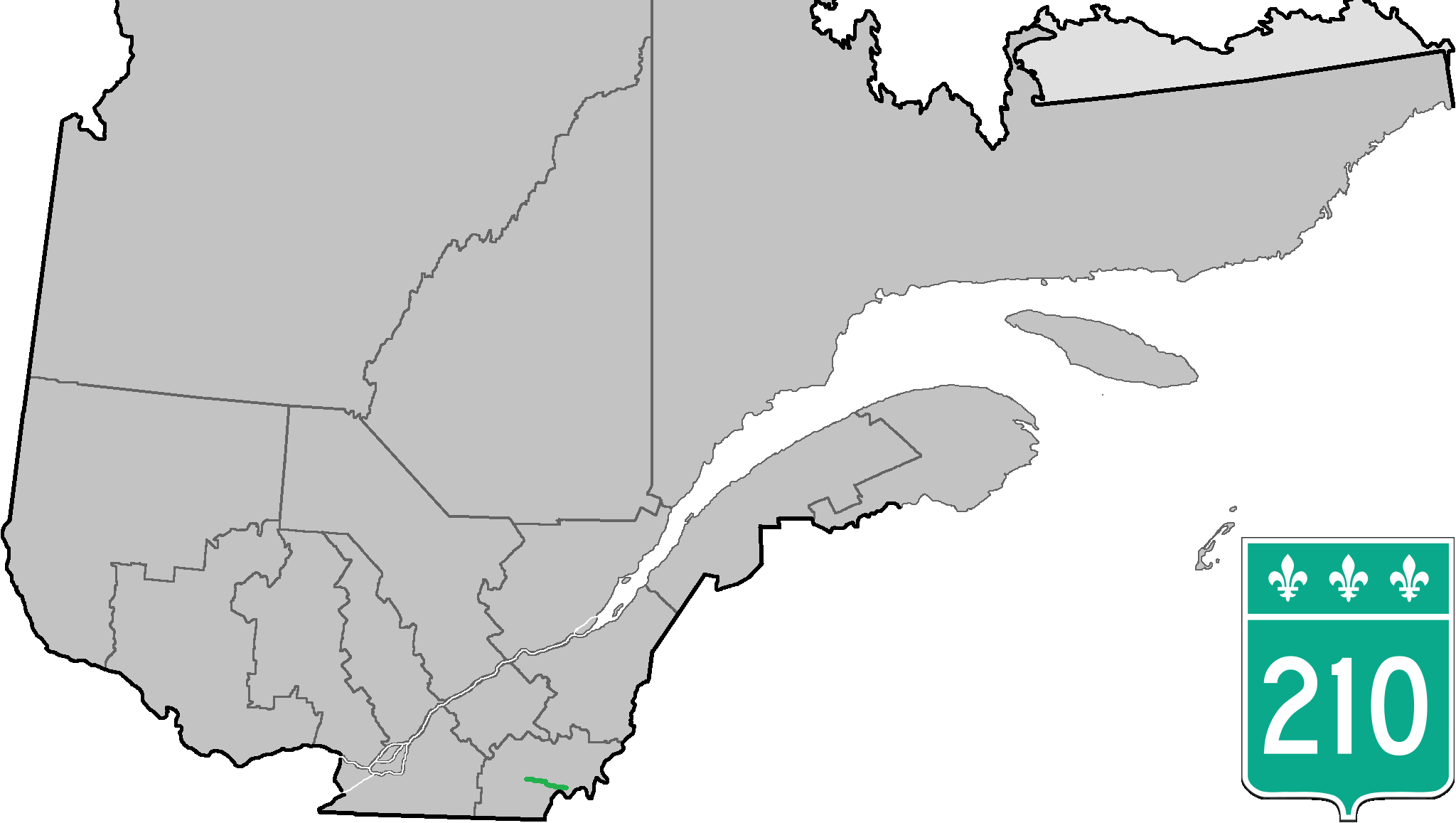

Route information
- Maintained by Transports Québec
- Length: 40.9 km (25.4 mi)

Major junctions
- West end: R-108 in Cookshire-Eaton
- R-253 in Cookshire-Eaton
- East end: R-257 in Chartierville

Location
- Country: Canada
- Province: Quebec

Highway system
- Quebec provincial highways; Autoroutes; List; Former
← R-209	→ R-211

Route 210 is a provincial highway located in the Estrie region of Quebec. The 40.9 km (25.4 mi) highway runs from west to east from the Eaton area of Cookshire-Eaton at the junction of Route 108 to Chartierville at the junction of Route 257, via the village of Sawyerville. Between Eaton and Sawyerville, it overlaps Route 253 for slightly more than 4 km (2.5 mi).

Approximately 15 km (9.3 mi) of the easternmost section of Route 210 is unpaved, other than the final 450 metres (0.28 mi) approaching the terminus at Route 257.

== Municipalities along Route 210 ==
- Cookshire-Eaton
- Newport
- Chartierville
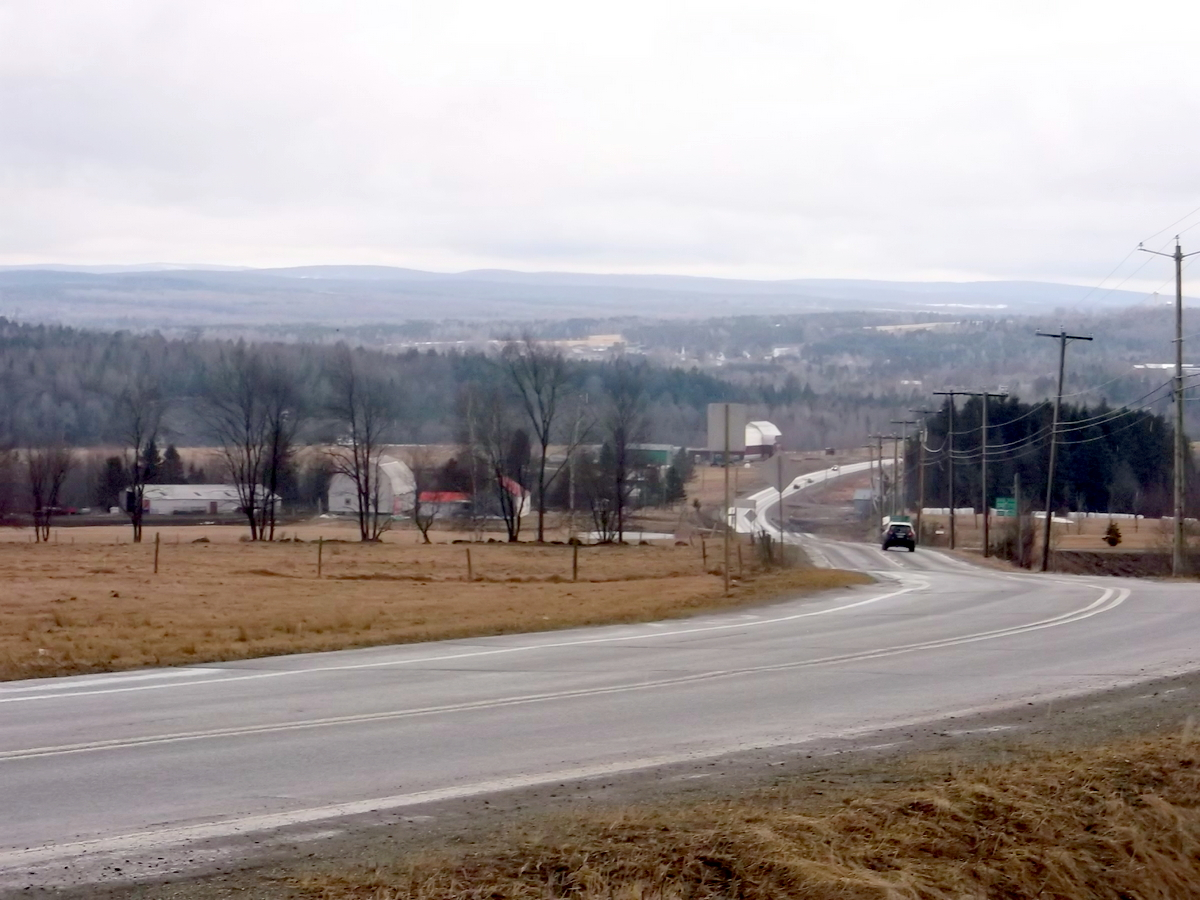
Route 210 east of Eaton Corner.

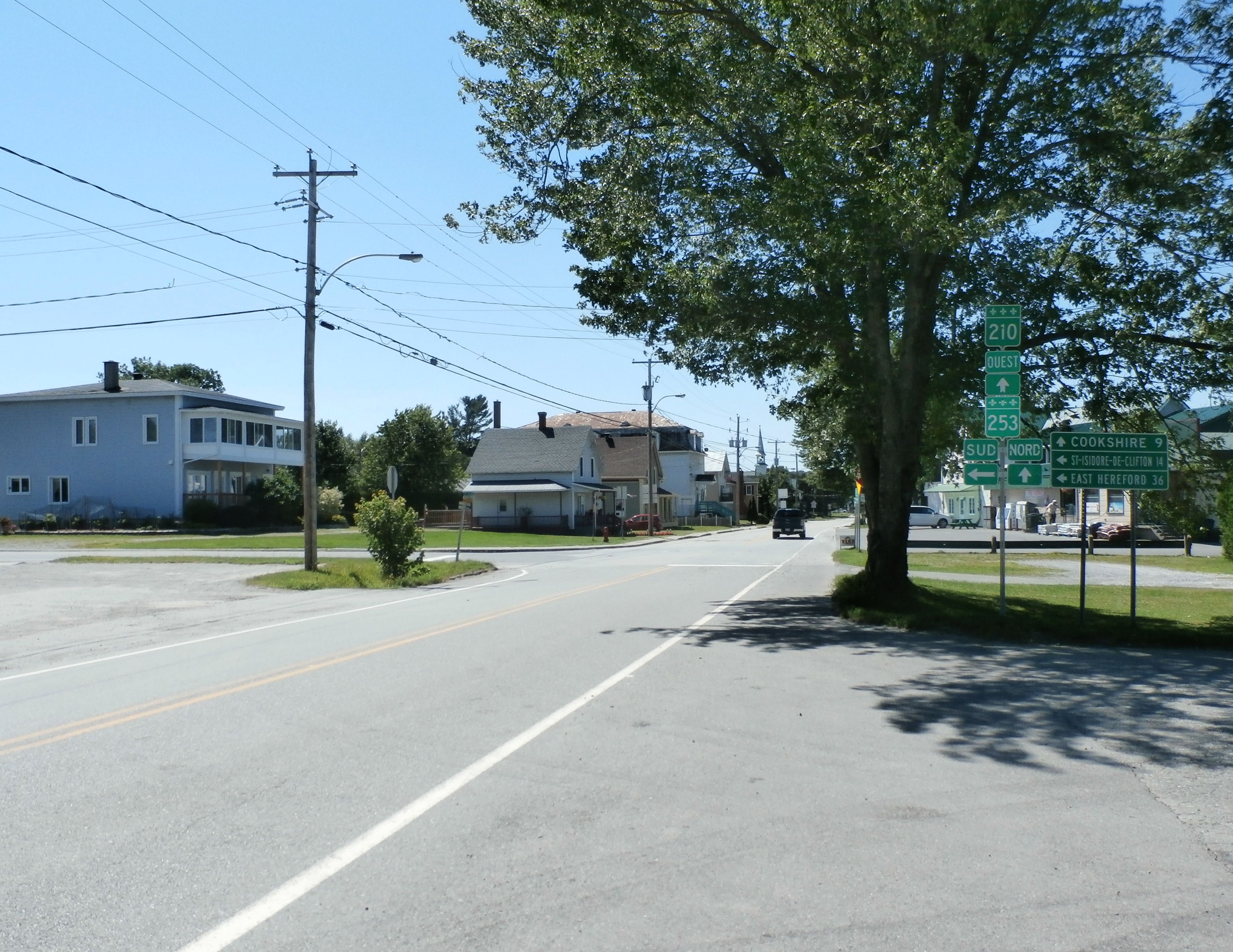
Route 253 and 210 in Sawyerville.

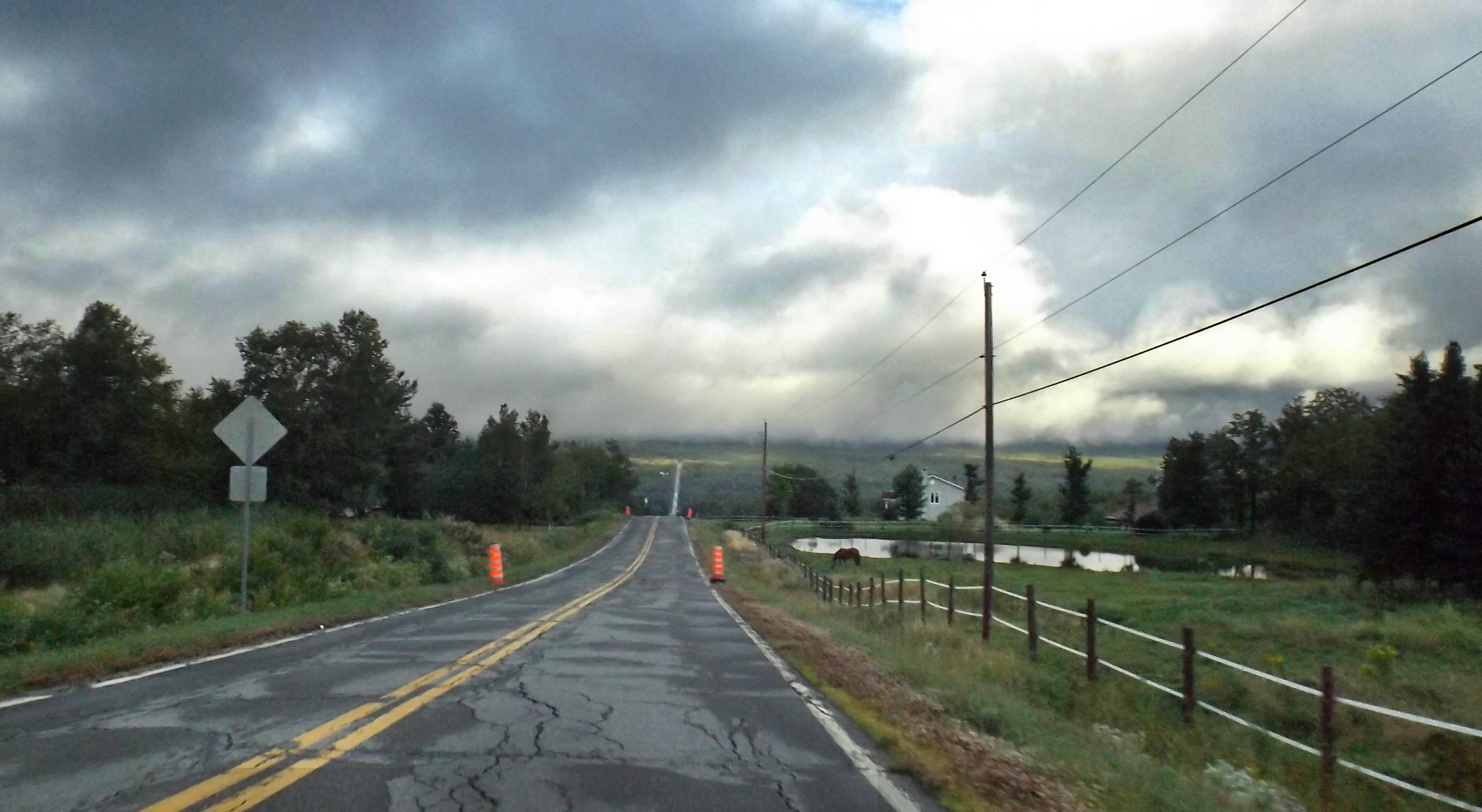
Route 210 nearing Saint-Mathias-de-Bonneterre.

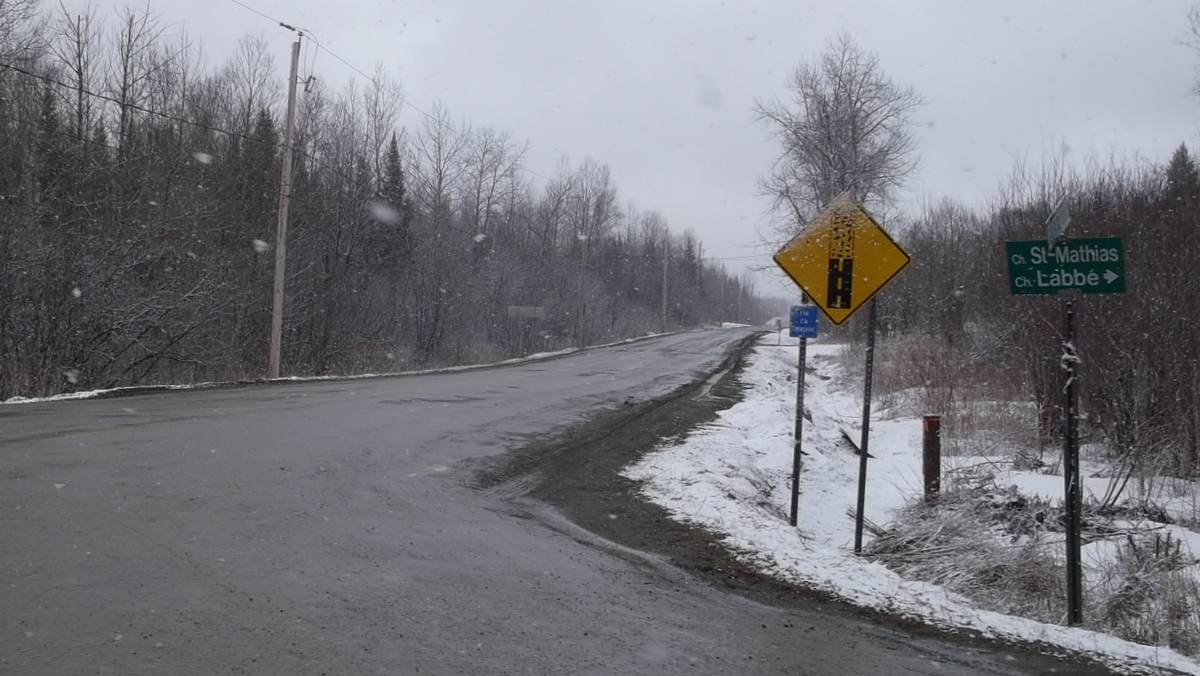
Route 210 is unpaved between Saint-Mathias and Chartierville.

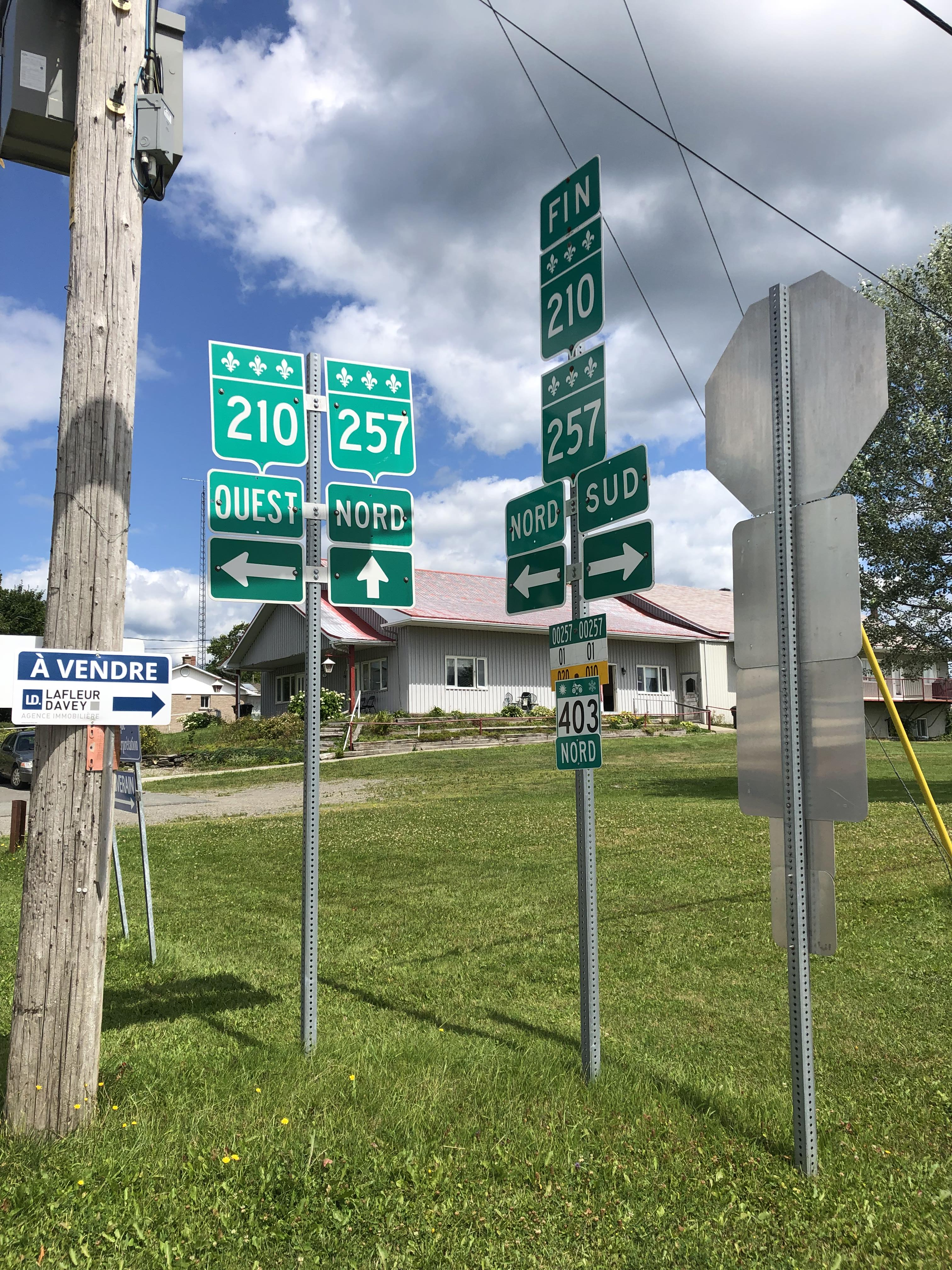
Eastern terminus of Route 210 in Chartierville.

== Major intersections ==
The entire route is in Le Haut-Saint-François RCM.

Location	km	mi	Destinations	Notes
Cookshire-Eaton	0	0.0	R-108 – Sherbrooke, Bury	Western terminus
Cookshire-Eaton	5.2	3.2	R-253 north – Cookshire	Begin/end concurrency with Route 253
Cookshire-Eaton	9.8	6.1	R-253 south – Saint-Isidore-de-Clifton	Begin/end concurrency with Route 253
Chartierville	40.9	25.4	R-257 – Pittsburg, New Hampshire, La Patrie	Eastern terminus
1.000 mi = 1.609 km; 1.000 km = 0.621 mi

== See also ==
- List of Quebec provincial highways
