= Westbury Secondary School =

School in Johannesburg, South Africa

Coordinates: 26.1797°S 27.9743°E

- Westbury, Johannesburg; South Africa

Information
- School type: Secondary school

Westbury Secondary School or Westbury High School is a secondary school in Westbury, Johannesburg, South Africa.

In 2014 officials from the South African Police Service (SAPS) and the Gauteng Department of Education raided the school to combat illegal drugs. K9 units were used to search for drugs. ENCA wrote that "Westbury has been indentified [sic] as a gangsterism hot spot".
