= Quebec Route 212 =

Highway in Quebec, Canada

Route 212

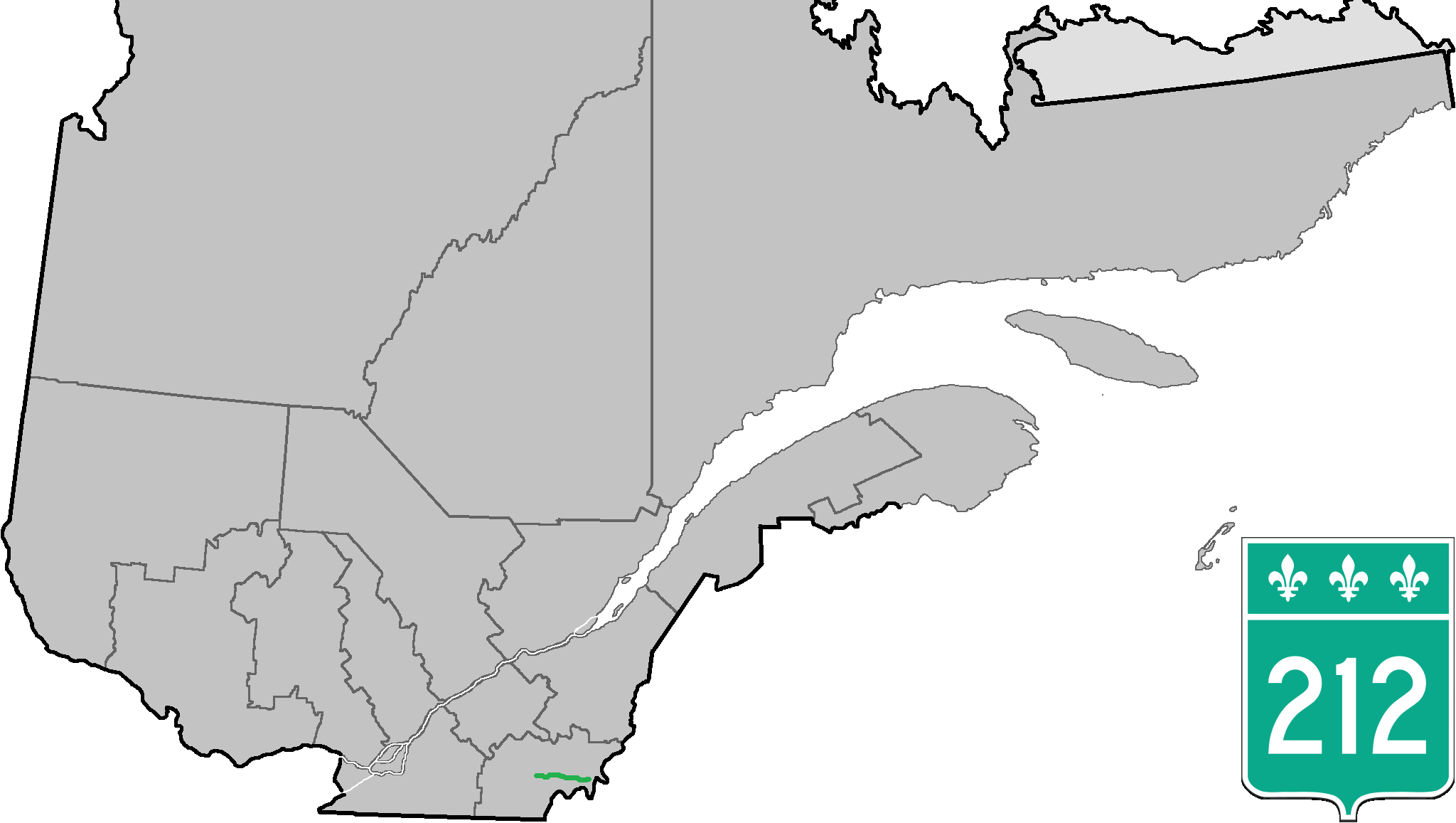

Route information
- Maintained by Transports Québec
- Length: 63.2 km (39.3 mi)

Major junctions
- West end: R-108 in Cookshire
- R-257 in La Patrie
- East end: R-161 in Saint-Augustin-de-Woburn

Location
- Country: Canada
- Province: Quebec

Highway system
- Quebec provincial highways; Autoroutes; List; Former
← R-211	→ R-213

Route 212 is a two-lane east/west highway in the Estrie region in the province of Quebec, Canada. It begins in the city of Cookshire at a junction with Route 108 and runs through Newport, La Patrie and Notre-Dame-des-Bois before reaching its terminal at Route 161 in the village of Woburn.

== Municipalities along Route 212 ==
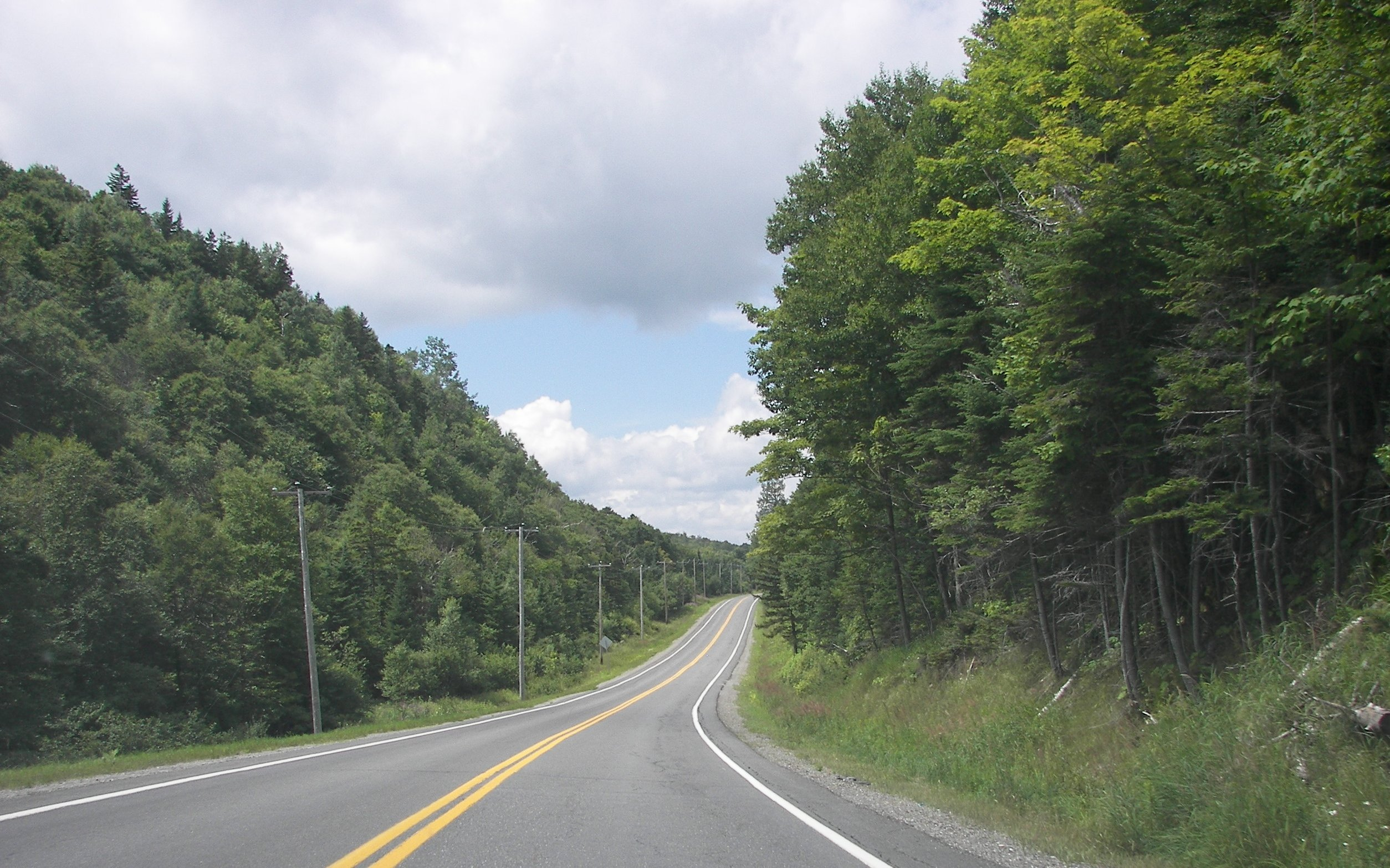
Quebec Route 212 between Saint-Augustin-de-Woburn and Notre-Dame-des-Bois

- Cookshire-Eaton
- Newport
- La Patrie
- Notre-Dame-des-Bois
- Saint-Augustin-de-Woburn

== Major intersections ==
RCM or ET	Municipality	Km	Junction	Notes
Western terminus of Route 212
Le Haut-Saint-François	Cookshire-Eaton	0.0	R-108	108 WEST: to Sherbrooke; 108 EAST: to Bury
Le Haut-Saint-François	La Patrie	31.0	R-257	257 SOUTH: to Chartierville; 257 NORTH: to Hampden & Scotstown
Le Granit	Saint-Augustin-de-Woburn	63.2	R-161	161 SOUTH: to SR 27 in Coburn Gore, Maine; 161 NORTH: to Frontenac
Eastern terminus of Route 212

== See also ==
- List of Quebec provincial highways
