= Westbury (surname) =

Westbury is a surname. Notable people with the surname include:

- David Westbury (1923–1983), English physician
- Edgar T. Westbury (1896–1970), British model engineer
- Frank Atha Westbury (1838–1901), British author, popular in Australia and New Zealand
- Gerald Westbury (1927–2014), English surgeon who pioneered treatments for cancer
- Isabelle Westbury (born 1990), English cricketer
- Jayne Westbury (born 1957), English former cyclist
- John Westbury (died c. 1440/49), MP for Wiltshire in 1417 and 1419
- June Westbury (1921–2004), Canadian politician born in New Zealand
- Katherine Westbury (born 1993), Thai-New Zealand tennis player
- Ken Westbury (1927–2023), British cinematographer
- Marcus Westbury (born 1974), Australian festival director
- Marjorie Westbury (1905–1989), English actress and singer
- Paul Westbury, business executive
- Peter Westbury (1938–2015), British racing driver
- Richard Bethell, 1st Baron Westbury (1800–1873), Lord Chancellor of Great Britain
- William de Westbury (died c. 1440), English judge
