= East Angus, Quebec =

East Angus
- City
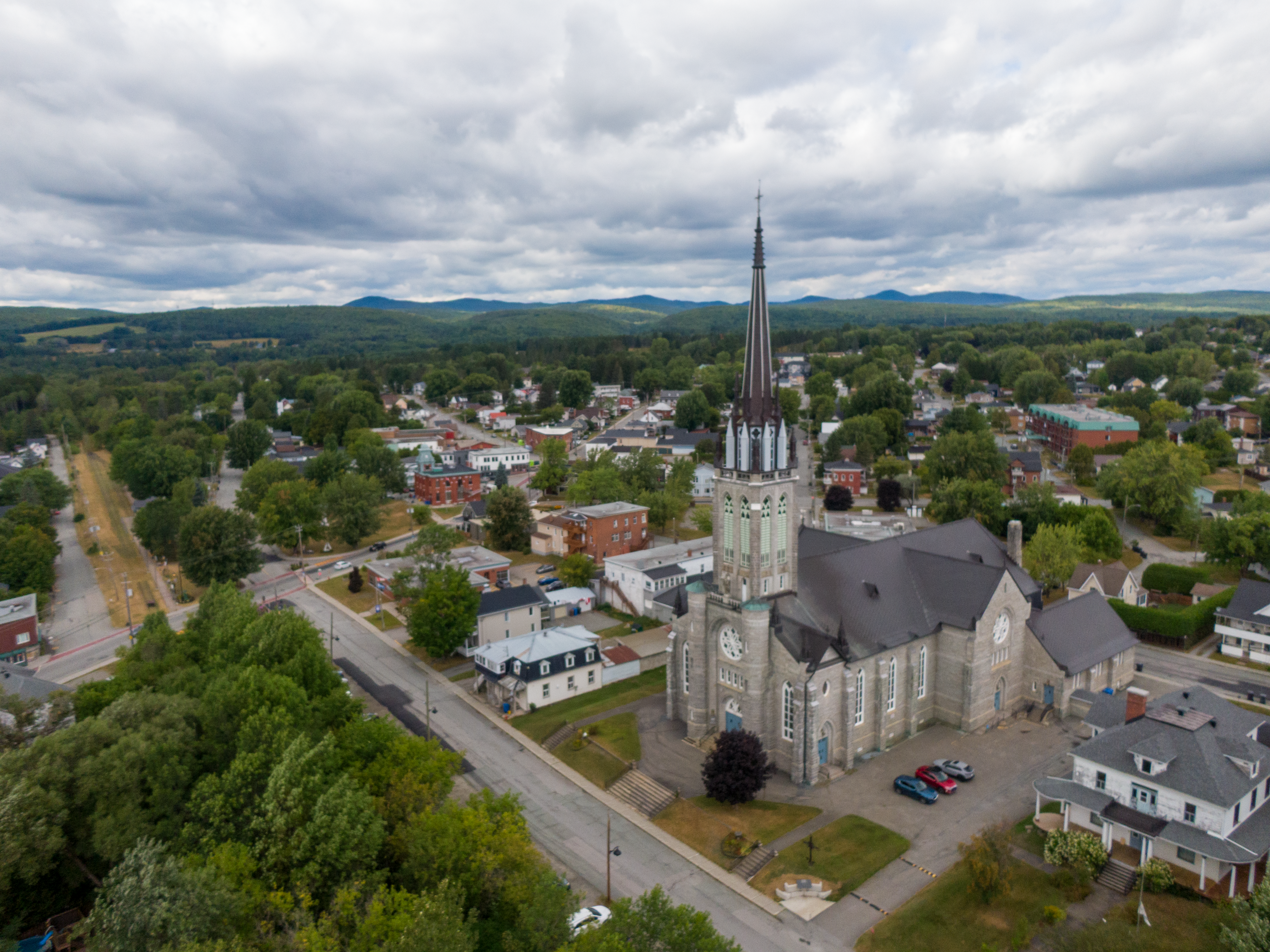

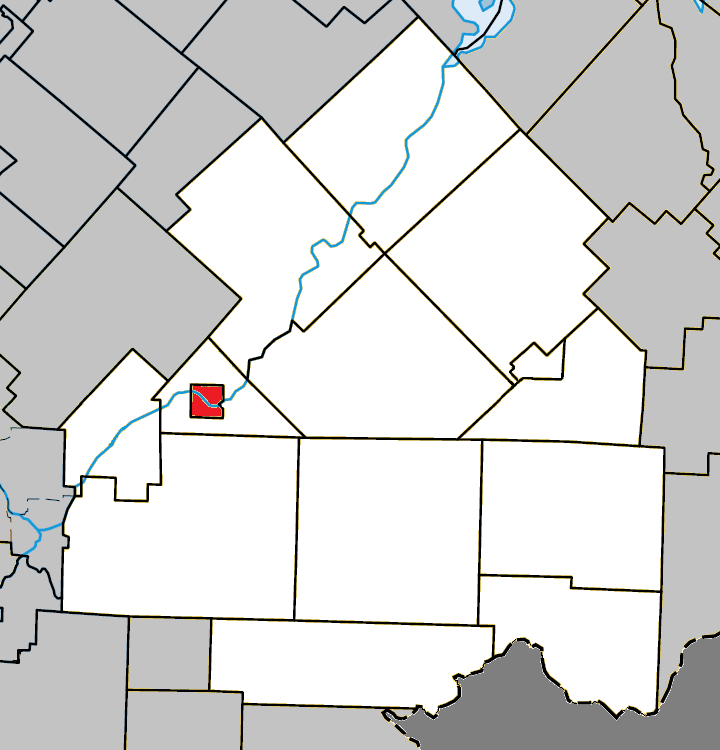
- Location within Le Haut-Saint-François RCM

- Location in southern Quebec
- Coordinates: 45°29′N 71°40′W
- Country: Canada
- Province: Quebec
- Region: Estrie
- RCM: Le Haut-Saint-François
- Constituted: March 14, 1912

Government
  - Mayor: Robert G. Roy
  - Federal riding: Compton—Stanstead
  - Prov. riding: Mégantic

Area
  - Total: 8.30 km^{2} (3.20 sq mi)
  - Land: 7.91 km^{2} (3.05 sq mi)

Population (2011)
  - Total: 3,741
  - Density: 472.7/km^{2} (1,224/sq mi)
  - Pop 2006-2011: ▲11.4%
- Time zone: UTC−5 (EST)
  - Summer (DST): UTC−4 (EDT)
- Postal code(s): J0B 1R0
- Area code: 819
- Highways: R-112; R-214; R-253
- Website: www.ville.east-angus.qc.ca

East Angus (French pronunciation: [istɛ̃ɡys]) is a city in Le Haut-Saint-François Regional County Municipality, in Quebec, Canada. The city had a population of 3,741 as of the Canada 2011 Census.

== Demographics ==
In the 2021 Census of Population conducted by Statistics Canada, East Angus had a population of 3,840 living in 1,653 of its 1,718 total private dwellings, a change of 4.9% from its 2016 population of 3,659. With a land area of 7.84 km^{2} (3.03 sq mi), it had a population density of 489.8/km^{2} (1,268.6/sq mi) in 2021.
