= Cookshire-Eaton =

- City
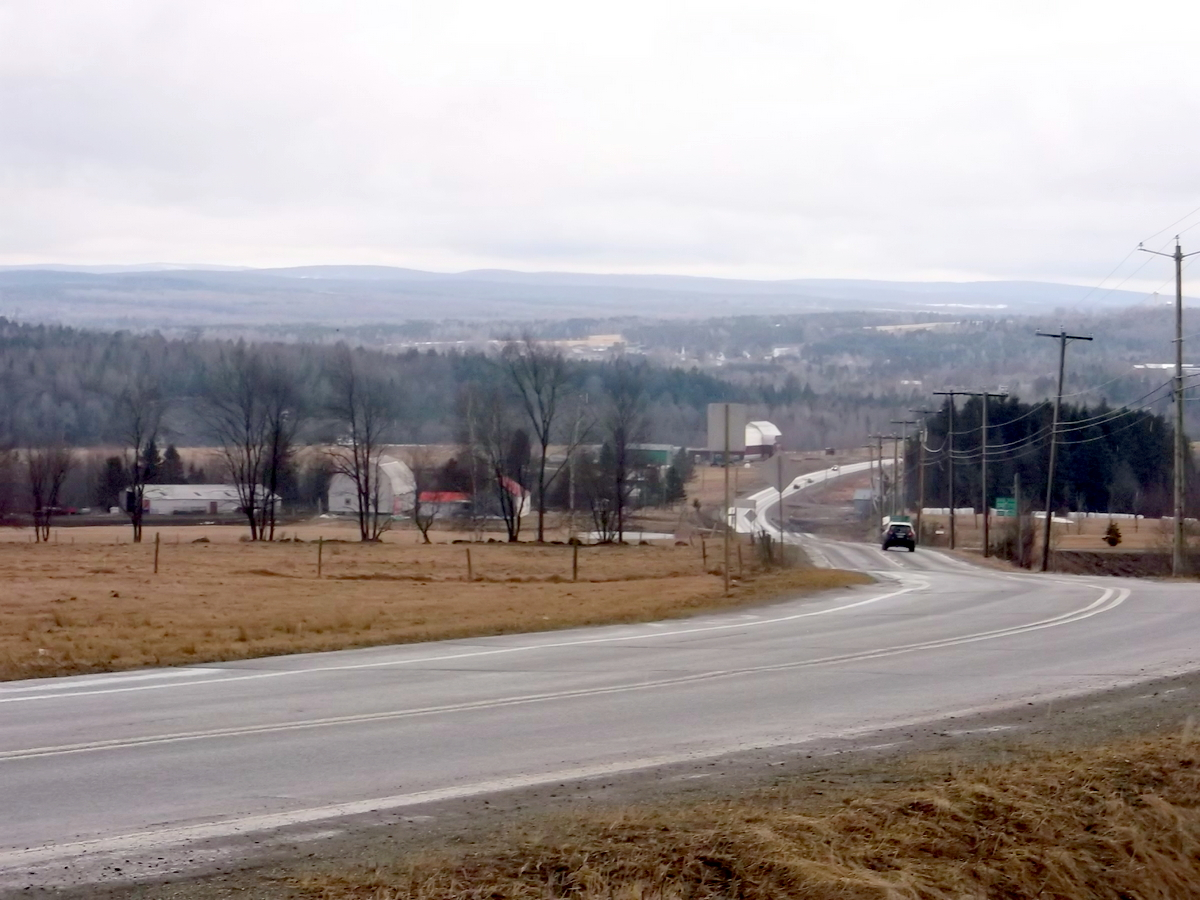

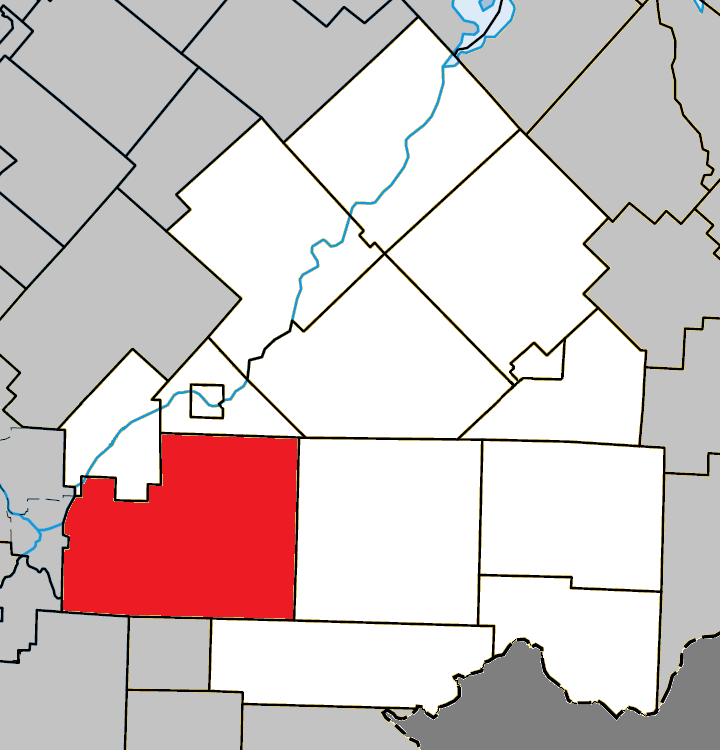
- Location within Le Haut-Saint-François RCM

- Location in southern Quebec
- Coordinates: 45.41342°N 71.63067°W
- Country: Canada
- Province: Quebec
- Region: Estrie
- RCM: Le Haut-Saint-François
- Constituted: 24 July 2002

Government
  - Mayor: Daphné Raymond
  - Federal riding: Compton—Stanstead
  - Prov. riding: Mégantic

Area
  - Total: 298.70 km^{2} (115.33 sq mi)
  - Land: 295.95 km^{2} (114.27 sq mi)

Population (2011)
  - Total: 5,171
  - Density: 17.5/km^{2} (45/sq mi)
  - Pop 2006-2011: ▲3.3%
- Time zone: UTC−5 (EST)
  - Summer (DST): UTC−4 (EDT)
- Postal code(s): J0B 1M0
- Area code: 819
- Highways: R-108; R-210; R-212; R-251; R-253
- Website: www.cookshire-eaton.qc.ca

Cookshire-Eaton (French: [kuk.ʃa.jœʁ‿i.tɔn]) is a city in the Estrie region of Quebec. It is the seat of Le Haut-Saint-François Regional County Municipality. Sherbrooke Airport is located there.

As part of the 2000–2006 municipal reorganization in Quebec, on 24 July 2002 the city of Cookshire, the municipality of Newport and the township of Eaton were merged to form Cookshire-Eaton; prior to this, on 25 April 2001, the village of Sawyerville had merged with Eaton. After a 2004 referendum, however, Newport de-merged and was reconstituted as an independent municipality as of 1 January 2006. Nevertheless, Newport and Cookshire-Eaton both remain part of the urban agglomeration of Cookshire-Eaton.

The community had a population of 5,171 in the Canada 2011 Census.

== Demographics ==
In the 2021 Census of Population conducted by Statistics Canada, Cookshire-Eaton had a population of 5,344 living in 2,190 of its 2,283 total private dwellings, a change of −0.9% from its 2016 population of 5,393. With a land area of 296.25 km^{2} (114.38 sq mi), it had a population density of 18.0/km^{2} (46.7/sq mi) in 2021.

== See also ==
- List of anglophone communities in Quebec
