= Bury, Quebec =

Bury
- Municipality
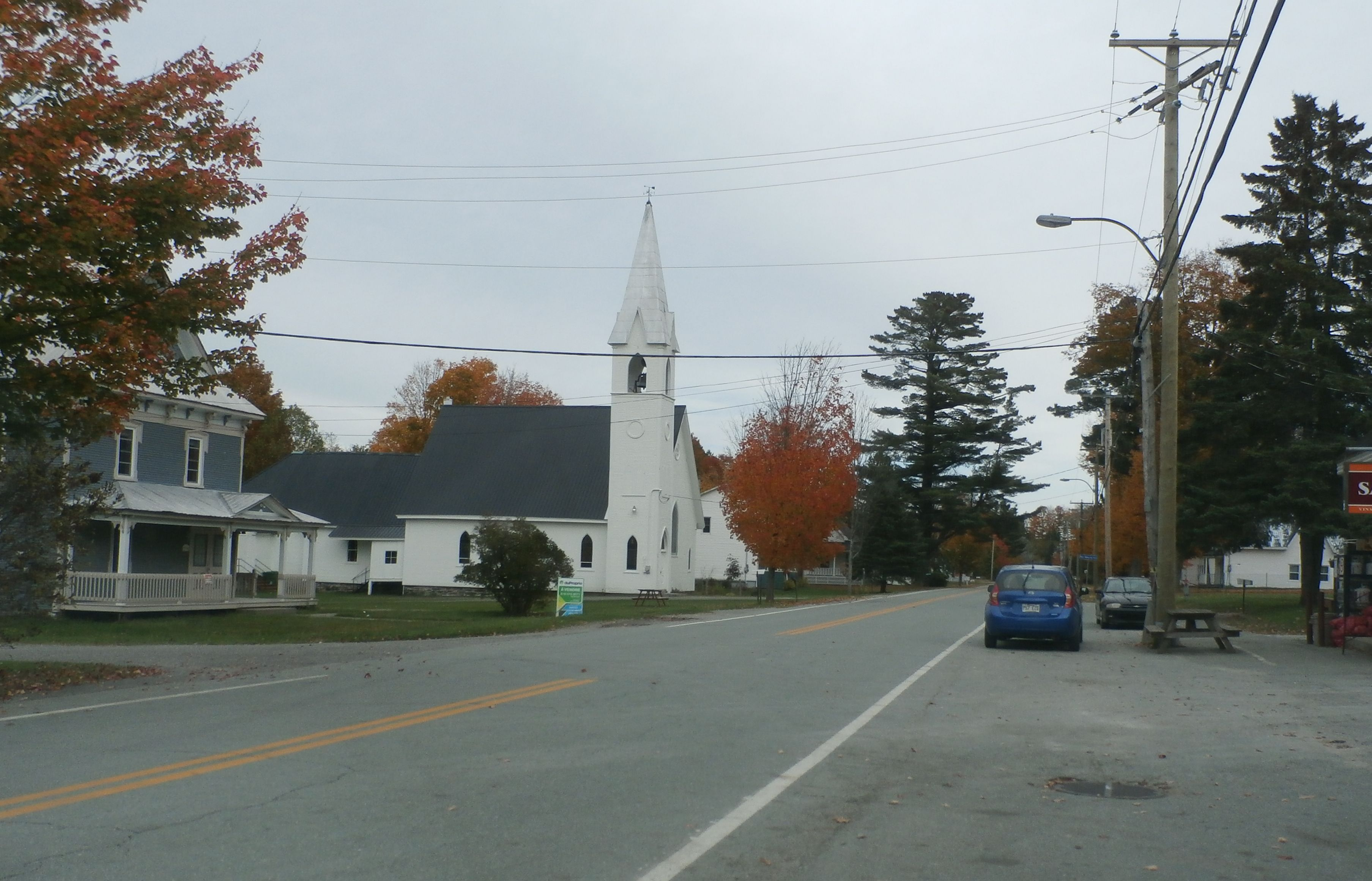

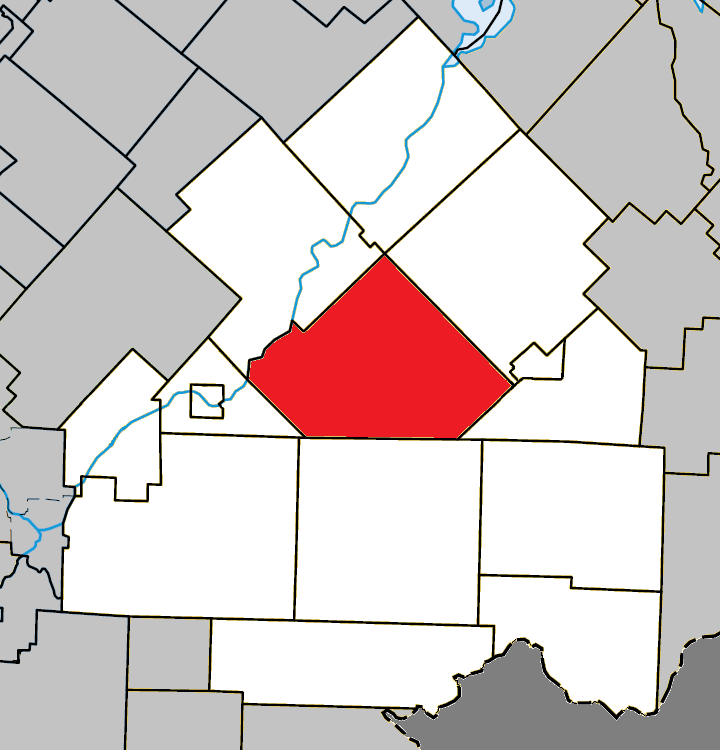
- Location within Le Haut-Saint-François RCM

- Location in southern Quebec
- Coordinates: 45°28′N 71°30′W
- Country: Canada
- Province: Quebec
- Region: Estrie
- RCM: Le Haut-Saint-François
- Constituted: 1 July 1855

Government
  - Mayor: Denis Savage
  - Federal riding: Compton—Stanstead
  - Prov. riding: Mégantic

Area
  - Total: 235.50 km^{2} (90.93 sq mi)
  - Land: 234.13 km^{2} (90.40 sq mi)
- There is an apparent contradiction between two authoritative sources

Population (2021)
  - Total: 1,252
  - Density: 5.3/km^{2} (14/sq mi)
  - Pop 2016-2021: ▲6.6%
- Time zone: UTC−5 (EST)
  - Summer (DST): UTC−4 (EDT)
- Postal code(s): J0B 1J0
- Area code: 819
- Highways: R-108; R-214; R-255
- Website: www.municipalite debury.qc.ca

Bury is a municipality within the Le Haut-Saint-François Regional County Municipality in the Estrie region of Quebec, Canada. It is part of the Eastern Townships.

Bury is home to a Canada Day celebration which is well known in the Estrie region and which draws in triple the town's population for a parade and events in the park. Bury has no restaurants or cinemas, but has two churches.

About 49% of Bury's population are bilingual (English and French), 43% only speaks French and 9% only speaks English.

In 1981, Mrs. Isabel Harrison of Bury was chosen by the Royal Canadian Legion as the Silver Cross Mother. Each year, a mother is invited to lay a wreath during the Remembrance Day ceremony at the National War Memorial in Ottawa on behalf of all mothers who have lost children in the service of their country. Widows and survivors of Canadian Forces' casualties are eligible to receive and wear the Memorial Cross. Politician Aylmer Byron Hunt was born in Bury.

== Geography ==
=== Climate ===
Climate data for Bury
Month	Jan	Feb	Mar	Apr	May	Jun	Jul	Aug	Sep	Oct	Nov	Dec	Year
Record high °C (°F)	13.3 (55.9)	15.5 (59.9)	22.2 (72.0)	28.9 (84.0)	31.1 (88.0)	32 (90)	33 (91)	34.4 (93.9)	29.4 (84.9)	27.8 (82.0)	21.1 (70.0)	14.5 (58.1)	34.4 (93.9)
Mean daily maximum °C (°F)	−6 (21)	−4.1 (24.6)	1.7 (35.1)	9.1 (48.4)	17.4 (63.3)	21.5 (70.7)	24.3 (75.7)	22.8 (73.0)	17.7 (63.9)	11.1 (52.0)	4 (39)	−2.8 (27.0)	9.7 (49.5)
Daily mean °C (°F)	−11.4 (11.5)	−9.6 (14.7)	−3.7 (25.3)	3.8 (38.8)	11.2 (52.2)	15.7 (60.3)	18.4 (65.1)	17.1 (62.8)	12.4 (54.3)	6.3 (43.3)	−0.2 (31.6)	−7.7 (18.1)	4.4 (39.9)
Mean daily minimum °C (°F)	−16.7 (1.9)	−15 (5)	−9.1 (15.6)	−1.6 (29.1)	5 (41)	9.9 (49.8)	12.5 (54.5)	11.5 (52.7)	7 (45)	1.4 (34.5)	−4.4 (24.1)	−12.5 (9.5)	−1 (30)
Record low °C (°F)	−38 (−36)	−38.9 (−38.0)	−33 (−27)	−22.2 (−8.0)	−7.8 (18.0)	−1.1 (30.0)	0 (32)	−1.1 (30.0)	−6 (21)	−12.2 (10.0)	−23.3 (−9.9)	−35.6 (−32.1)	−38.9 (−38.0)
Average precipitation mm (inches)	102.1 (4.02)	81.2 (3.20)	104.6 (4.12)	96.7 (3.81)	107.2 (4.22)	117.8 (4.64)	118.5 (4.67)	135 (5.3)	113.3 (4.46)	102.2 (4.02)	104.6 (4.12)	102.8 (4.05)	1,285.8 (50.62)
Source: Environment Canada

== See also ==
- List of anglophone communities in Quebec
