= Le Haut-Saint-François Regional County Municipality =

Le Haut-Saint-François
- Regional county municipality
- Coordinates: 45°28′N 71°32′W
- Country: Canada
- Province: Quebec
- Region: Estrie
- Effective: January 1, 1982
- County seat: Cookshire-Eaton

Government
  - Type: Prefecture
  - Prefect: Robert G. Roy

Area
  - Total: 2,307.50 km^{2} (890.93 sq mi)
  - Land: 2,273.39 km^{2} (877.76 sq mi)

Population (2016)
  - Total: 22,335
  - Density: 9.8/km^{2} (25/sq mi)
  - Change 2011-2016: ▲1.2%
- Time zone: UTC−5 (EST)
  - Summer (DST): UTC−4 (EDT)
- Area code: 819
- Website: www.mrchsf.com

Le Haut-Saint-François (French pronunciation: [lə o sɛ̃ fʁɑ̃swa]; The Upper Saint-François [St. Francis]) is a regional county municipality in southeastern Quebec, Canada in the Estrie region. Its seat is in Cookshire-Eaton, and it is named for the Saint-François River which runs through the RCM.

== Subdivisions ==
There are 14 subdivisions within the RCM:

Cities & towns (3)

- Cookshire-Eaton
- East Angus
- Scotstown

Municipalities (8)

- Ascot Corner
- Bury
- Chartierville
- Dudswell
- La Patrie
- Newport
- Saint-Isidore-de-Clifton
- Weedon

Townships (3)

- Hampden
- Lingwick
- Westbury

== Demographics ==
Mother tongue data, from Canada 2016 Census:

Language	Population	Pct (%)
French only	19,580	88.3%
English only	2,195	9.9%
Both English and French	205	0.9%
Other languages	200	0.9%

== Transportation ==
=== Access routes ===
Highways and numbered routes that run through the municipality, including external routes that start or finish at the county border:

- Autoroutes
  - None
- Principal highways
  - R-108
  - R-112
  - R-161
- Secondary highways
  - R-210
  - R-212
  - R-214
  - R-251
  - R-253
  - R-255
  - R-257
- External routes
  - US 3

== See also ==
- List of regional county municipalities and equivalent territories in Quebec
