= Sawyerville, Quebec =

Unincorporated community in Quebec, Canada

Coordinates: 45.337957°N 71.567396°W

Sawyerville is an unincorporated community in Le Haut-Saint-François County, Quebec, Canada. It is recognized as a designated place by Statistics Canada.

== Demographics ==
In the 2021 Census of Population conducted by Statistics Canada, Sawyerville had a population of 782 living in 354 of its 375 total private dwellings, a change of -2.5% from its 2016 population of 802. With a land area of 12.78 km^{2} (4.93 sq mi), it had a population density of 61.2/km^{2} (158.5/sq mi) in 2021.

== See also ==
- List of communities in Quebec
- List of designated places in Quebec
