= Newport, Quebec =

Newport
- Municipality
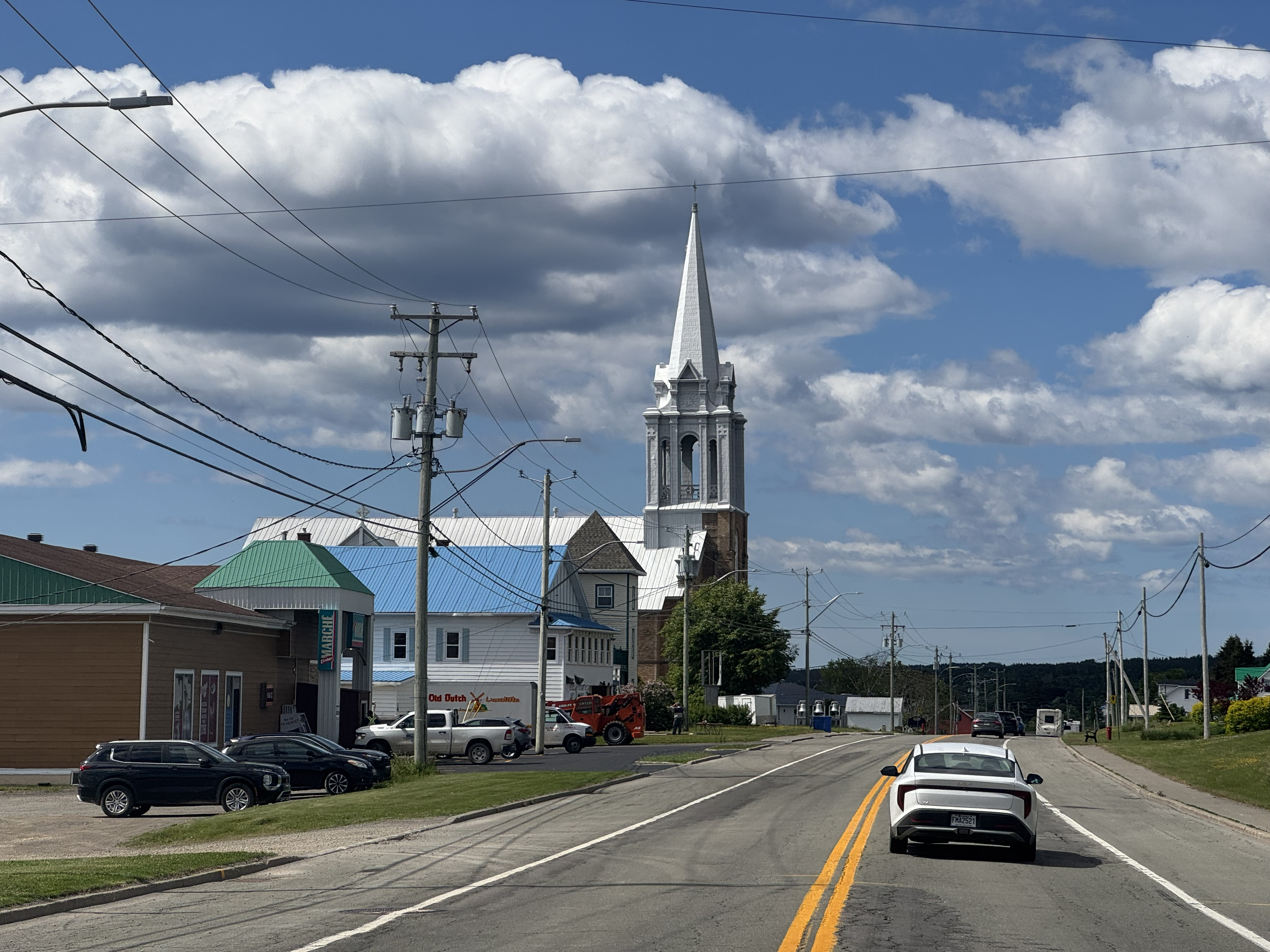

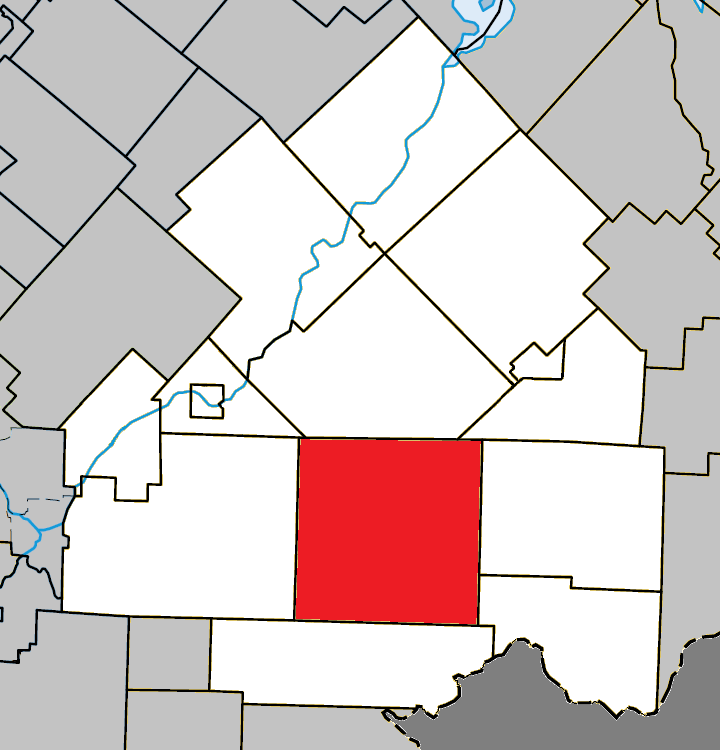
- Location within Le Haut-Saint-François RCM

- Location in southern Quebec
- Coordinates: 45°23′N 71°29′W
- Country: Canada
- Province: Quebec
- Region: Estrie
- RCM: Le Haut-Saint-François
- Constituted: January 1, 2006

Government
  - Mayor: Robert Asselin
  - Federal riding: Compton—Stanstead
  - Prov. riding: Mégantic

Area
  - Total: 272.50 km^{2} (105.21 sq mi)
  - Land: 270.63 km^{2} (104.49 sq mi)

Population (2021)
  - Total: 698
  - Density: 2.6/km^{2} (6.7/sq mi)
  - Pop 2016-2021: ▼4.8%
  - Dwellings: 401
- Time zone: UTC−5 (EST)
  - Summer (DST): UTC−4 (EDT)
- Postal code(s): J0B 1M0
- Area code: 819
- Highways: R-108; R-210; R-212

Newport is a municipality of about 700 people in Le Haut-Saint-François Regional County Municipality, in Quebec, Canada. Newport has a small town called Island Brook.

On July 24, 2002, the then-township of Newport was amalgamated into the city of Cookshire-Eaton as part of the early 2000s municipal reorganization in Quebec. After a referendum, Newport de-merged and became an independent municipality on January 1, 2006. However, it remains part of the urban agglomeration of Cookshire-Eaton.

== See also ==
- List of anglophone communities in Quebec
