= Environmental impacts of beavers =

Beaver dam enlargement

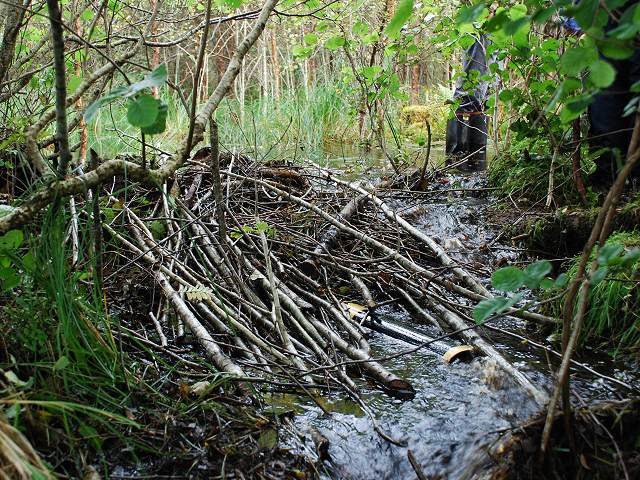
September 2009

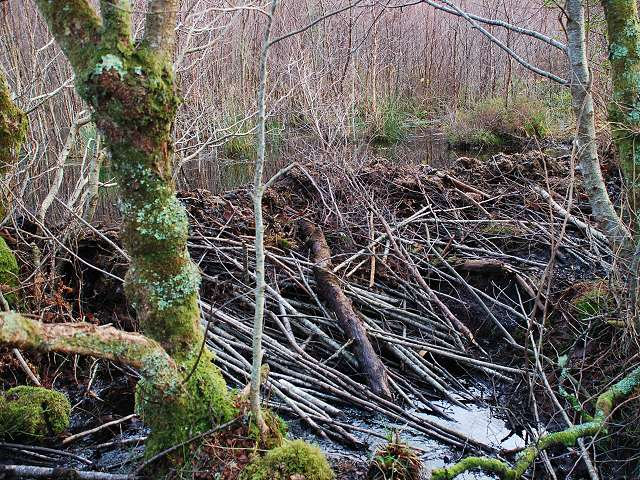
December 2009

Images of a beaver dam over a four month period. Beaver dams block rivers and create ponds.

The beaver is a keystone species, increasing biodiversity in its territory through creation of ponds and wetlands. As wetlands are formed and riparian habitats enlarged, aquatic plants colonize newly available watery habitat. Insect, invertebrate, fish, mammal, and bird diversities are also expanded. Effects of beaver recolonization on native and non-native species in streams where they have been historically absent, particularly dryland streams, is not well-researched.

== Effects on stream flows and water quality ==
Beaver ponds increase stream flows in seasonally dry streams by storing run-off in the rainy season, which raises groundwater tables via percolation from beaver ponds. In a recent study using 12 serial aerial photo mosaics from 1948 to 2002, the impact of the return of beavers on openwater area in east-central Alberta, Canada, found that the mammals were associated with a 9-fold increase in openwater area. Beavers returned to the area in 1954 after a long absence since their extirpation by the fur trade in the 19th century. During drought years, where beavers were present, 60% more open water was available than those same areas during previous drought periods when beavers were absent. The authors concluded that beavers have a dramatic influence on the creation and maintenance of wetlands even during extreme drought.

From streams in the Maryland coastal plain to Lake Tahoe, beaver ponds have been shown to remove sediment and pollutants, including total suspended solids, total nitrogen, phosphates, carbon, and silicates, thus improving stream water quality. In addition, fecal coliform and streptococci bacteria excreted into streams by grazing cattle are reduced by beaver ponds, where slowing currents lead to settling of the bacteria in bottom sediments.

Following findings that the parasite Giardia lamblia, which causes giardiasis, was putatively carried by beavers, the term "beaver fever" was coined by the American press in the 1970s. Further research has shown that many animals and birds carry this parasite, and the major source of water contamination is by humans. Recent concerns point to domestic animals as a significant vector of giardia, with young calves in dairy herds testing as high as 100% positive for giardia. New Zealand has giardia outbreaks, but no beavers, whereas Norway has plenty of beavers, but had no giardia outbreaks until recently (in a southern part of Norway densely populated by humans but no beaver).

In 2011, a Eurasian beaver pair was introduced to a beaver project site in West Devon, consisting of a 4.4 acres (1.8 ha) large enclosure with a 600 feet (183 m) long channel and one pond. Within five years, the pair created a complex wetland with an extensive network of channels, 13 ponds and dams. Survey results showed that the created ponds hold 6.50–22.74 pounds per square foot (31.75–111.05 kg/m^{2}) of sediment, which stores 13.19–18.11 long tons; 14.77–20.28 short tons (13.40–18.40 t) of carbon and 0.75–1.04 long tons; 0.84–1.17 short tons (0.76–1.06 t) of nitrogen. Concentrations of carbon and nitrogen were significantly higher in these ponds than farther upstream of this site. These results indicate that the beavers' activity contributes to reducing the effects of soil erosion and pollution in agricultural landscapes.

== Effects on animals ==
=== Bird abundance and diversity ===
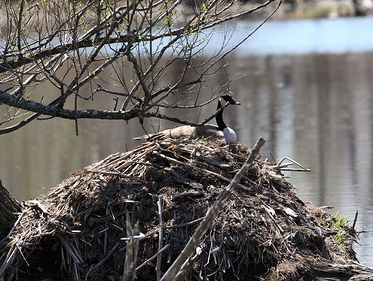
Canada goose nest on beaver lodge

Beavers help waterfowl by creating increased areas of water, and in northerly latitudes, they thaw areas of open water, allowing an earlier nesting season. In a study of Wyoming streams and rivers, watercourses with beavers had 75-fold more ducks than those without.

Trumpeter swans (Cygnus buccinator) and Canada geese (Branta canadensis) often depend on beaver lodges as nesting sites. Canada's small trumpeter swan population was observed not to nest on large lakes, preferring instead to nest on the smaller lakes and ponds associated with beaver activity.

Beavers may benefit birds frequenting their ponds in several additional ways. Removal of some pondside trees by beavers increases the density and height of the grass–forb–shrub layer, which enhances waterfowl nesting cover adjacent to ponds. Both forest gaps where trees had been felled by beavers and a "gradual edge" described as a complex transition from pond to forest with intermixed grasses, forbs, saplings, and shrubs are strongly associated with greater migratory bird species richness and abundance. Coppicing of waterside willows and cottonwoods by beavers leads to dense shoot production which provides important cover for birds and the insects on which they feed. Widening of the riparian terrace alongside streams is associated with beaver dams and has been shown to increase riparian bird abundance and diversity, an impact that may be especially important in semiarid climates.

As trees are drowned by rising beaver impoundments, they become ideal nesting sites for woodpeckers, which carve cavities that attract many other bird species, including flycatchers (Empidonax spp.), tree swallows (Tachycineta bicolor), tits (Paridae spp.), wood ducks (Aix sponsa), goldeneyes (Bucephala spp.), mergansers (Mergus spp.), owls (Tytonidae, Strigidae) and American kestrels (Falco sparverius). Piscivores, including herons (Ardea spp.), grebes (Podicipedidae), cormorants (Phalacrocorax ssp.), American bitterns (Botaurus lentiginosa), great egret (Ardea alba), snowy egret (Egretta thula), mergansers, and belted kingfishers (Megaceryle alcyon), use beaver ponds for fishing. Hooded mergansers (Lophodytes cucullatus), green heron (Butorides virescens), great blue heron (Ardea herodias) and belted kingfisher appeared more frequently in New York wetlands where beaver were active than at sites with no beaver activity.

By perennializing streams in arid deserts, beavers can create habitat which increases abundance and diversity of riparian-dependent species. For example, such as the upper San Pedro River in southeastern Arizona, reintroduced beavers have created a willow and pool habitat which has extended the range of the endangered Southwestern willow flycatcher (Empidonax trailii extimus) with the southernmost verifiable nest recorded in 2005.

=== Bats ===
Beaver modifications to streams in Poland have been associated with increased bat activity. While overall bat activity was increased, Myotis bat species, particularly Myotis daubentonii, activity may be hampered in locations where beaver ponds allow for increased presence of duckweed.

=== Trout and salmon ===
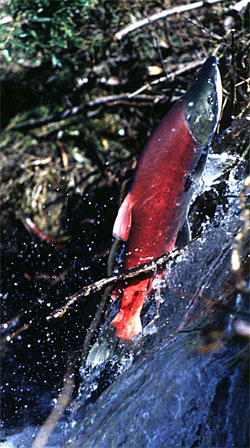
Salmon (Oncorhynchus nerka) jumping beaver dam

Beaver ponds have been shown to have a beneficial effect on trout and salmon populations. Many authors believe that the decline of salmonid fishes is related to the decline in beaver populations. Research in the Stillaguamish River basin in Washington found that extensive loss of beaver ponds resulted in an 89% reduction in coho salmon (Oncorhynchus kisutch) smolt summer production and an almost equally detrimental 86% reduction in critical winter habitat carrying capacity. This study also found that beaver ponds increased smolt salmon production 80 times more than the placement of large woody debris. Swales and Leving had previously shown on the Coldwater River in British Columbia that off-channel beaver ponds were preferentially populated by coho salmon over other salmonids and provided overwintering protection, protection from high summer snowmelt flows and summer coho rearing habitat. Beaver-impounded tidal pools on the Pacific Northwest's Elwha River delta support three times as many juvenile Chinook salmon (Oncorhynchus tshawytscha) as pools without beaver.

The presence of beaver dams has also been shown to increase either the number of fish, their size, or both, in a study of brook trout (Salvelinus fontinalis), rainbow trout (Oncorhynchus mykiss) and brown trout (Salmo trutta) in Sagehen Creek, which flows into the Little Truckee River at an altitude of 5,800 feet (1,800 m) in the northern Sierra Nevada. These findings are consistent with a study of small streams in Sweden, that found that brown trout were larger in beaver ponds compared with those in riffle sections, and that beaver ponds provide habitat for larger trout in small streams during periods of drought. Similarly, brook trout, coho salmon, and sockeye salmon (Oncorhynchus nerka) were significantly larger in beaver ponds than those in unimpounded stream sections in Colorado and Alaska. In a recent study on a headwater Appalachian stream, brook trout were also larger in beaver ponds.

Most beaver dams do not pose barriers to trout and salmon migration, although they may be restricted seasonally during periods of low stream flows. In a meta-review of studies claiming that beaver dams act as fish passage barriers, Kemp et al. found that 78% of these claims were not supported by any data. In a 2013 study of radiotelemetry-tagged Bonneville cutthroat trout (Oncorhynchus clarki utah) and brook trout (Salvelinus fontinalis) in Utah, both of these fish species crossed beaver dams in both directions, including dams up to 6.6 feet (2 m) high. Rainbow, brown, and brook trout have been shown to cross as many as 14 consecutive beaver dams. Both adults and juveniles of coho salmon, steelhead trout, sea run cutthroat (Oncorhyncus clarki clarki), Dolly Varden trout (Salvelinus malma malma), and sockeye salmon are able to cross beaver dams. In southeast Alaska, coho jumped dams as high as two meters, were found above all beaver dams and had their highest densities in streams with beaver. In Oregon coastal streams, beaver dams are ephemeral and almost all wash out in high winter flows only to be rebuilt every summer. Migration of adult Atlantic salmon (Salmo salar) may be limited by beaver dams, but the presence of juveniles upstream from the dams suggests that the dams are penetrated by parr. Downstream migration of Atlantic salmon smolts was similarly unaffected by beaver dams, even in periods of low flows. Two-year-old Atlantic salmon parr in beaver ponds in eastern Canada showed faster summer growth in length and mass and were in better condition than parr upstream or downstream from the pond.

The importance of winter habitat to salmonids afforded by beaver ponds may be especially important in streams without deep pools or where ice cover makes contact with the bottom of shallow streams. Enos Mills wrote in 1913, "One dry winter the stream ... ran low and froze to the bottom, and the only trout in it that survived were those in the deep holes of beaver ponds." Cutthroat trout and bull trout were noted to overwinter in Montana beaver ponds, brook trout congregated in winter in New Brunswick and Wyoming beaver ponds, and coho salmon in Oregon beaver ponds. In 2011, a meta-analysis of studies of beaver impacts on salmonids found that beaver were a net benefit to salmon and trout populations primarily by improving habitat (building ponds) both for rearing and overwintering and that this conclusion was based over half the time on scientific data. In contrast, the most often cited negative impact of beavers on fishes were barriers to migration, although that conclusion was based on scientific data only 22% of the time. They also found that when beaver dams do present barriers, these are generally short-lived, as the dams are overtopped, blown out, or circumvented by storm surges.

By creating additional channel network complexity, including ponds and marshes laterally separated from the main channel, beavers may play a role in the creation and maintenance of fish biodiversity. In off-mainstem channels restored by beaver on the middle section of Utah's Provo River, native fish species persist even when they have been extirpated in the mainstem channel by competition from introduced non-native fish. Efforts to restore salmonid habitat in the western United States have focused primarily on establishing large woody debris in streams to slow flows and create pools for young salmonids. Research in Washington found that the average summer smolt production per beaver dam ranges from 527 to 1,174 fish, whereas the summer smolt production from a pool formed by instream large woody debris is about 6–15 individuals, suggesting that re-establishment of beaver populations would be 80 times more effective.

Beaver have been discovered living in brackish water in estuarine tidal marshes where Chinook salmon (Oncorhynchus tshawytscha) densities were five times higher in beaver ponds than in neighboring areas.

=== Amphibians ===
A study of mid-elevation (1,840 feet (560 m) - 3,310 feet (1,010 m)) beaver-dammed vs. undammed lentic streams in Washington's southern Cascades found that prevalence of slow-developing amphibian populations was 2.7 times higher in the former, because beaver ponds were deeper with longer hydroperiods. Specifically, slow developing northern red-legged frogs (Rana aurora) and northwestern salamanders (Ambystoma gracile) were found almost exclusively in beaver-dammed locations, suggesting that these amphibians depend on beaver-engineered microhabitats. In the arid Great Basin of the western and northwestern United States, establishment of beaver ponds has been used as a successful management strategy to accelerate population growth of Columbia spotted frog (Rana luteiventris), which also depend on ponds with longer hydroperiods. In a report from Contra Costa County, California, both beaver dams and burrows associated with bank-lodges were found to provide refuge microhabitat for federally listed threatened California red-legged frog (Rana draytonii). Beaver-dammed ponds were also found to provide breeding habitat for R. draytonii adults and rearing habitat for their tadpoles. The report recommended that beaver "be treated as critical to the survival" of California red-legged frogs.

Beaver-engineered wetlands in the Boreal Foothills of west-central Alberta were also found to play a pre-eminent role in establishment of anuran species including the boreal chorus frog (Pseudacris maculata), North American wood frog (Rana sylvatica) and western toad (Anaxyrus boreas). In northern New York, mink frogs (Rana septentrionalis) were more abundant in larger ponds associated with beaver in the Adirondack Mountains, possibly because the colder, deeper water associated with large beaver ponds buffers this heat-intolerant species.

=== Insects ===
The fallen trees and stripped bark produced by beaver activity provides popular sites for oviposition of the virilis group of Drosophila, including the fruit fly Drosophila montana. Capture of these species of Drosophila for research is significantly more successful near beaver residences. The preference of beavers for birch, willow, and alder corresponds with oviposition site preferences of the Drosophila virilis species group, leading to commensalism between beavers and these species.

== Effects on riparian trees and vegetation ==
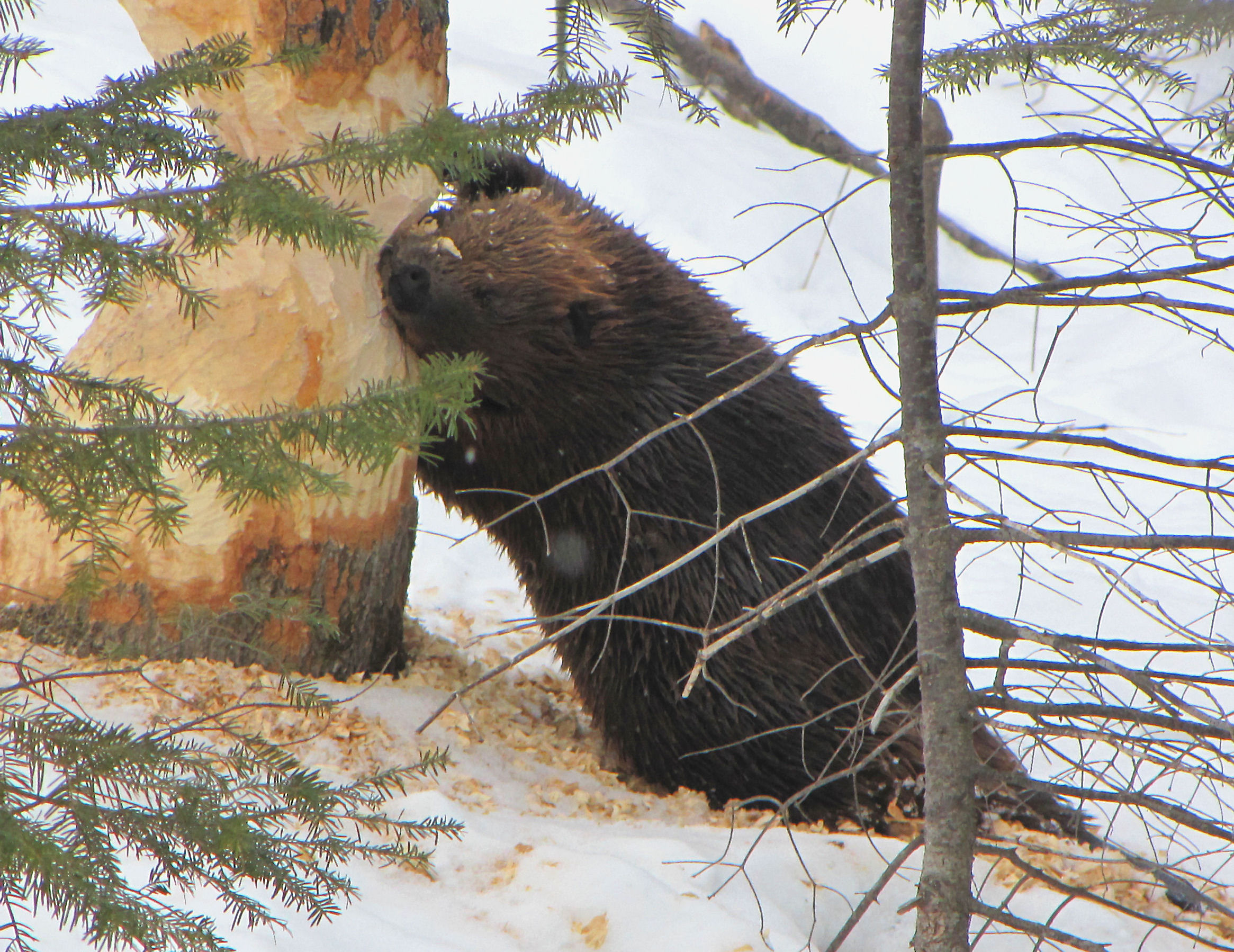
North American beaver chewing down a tree

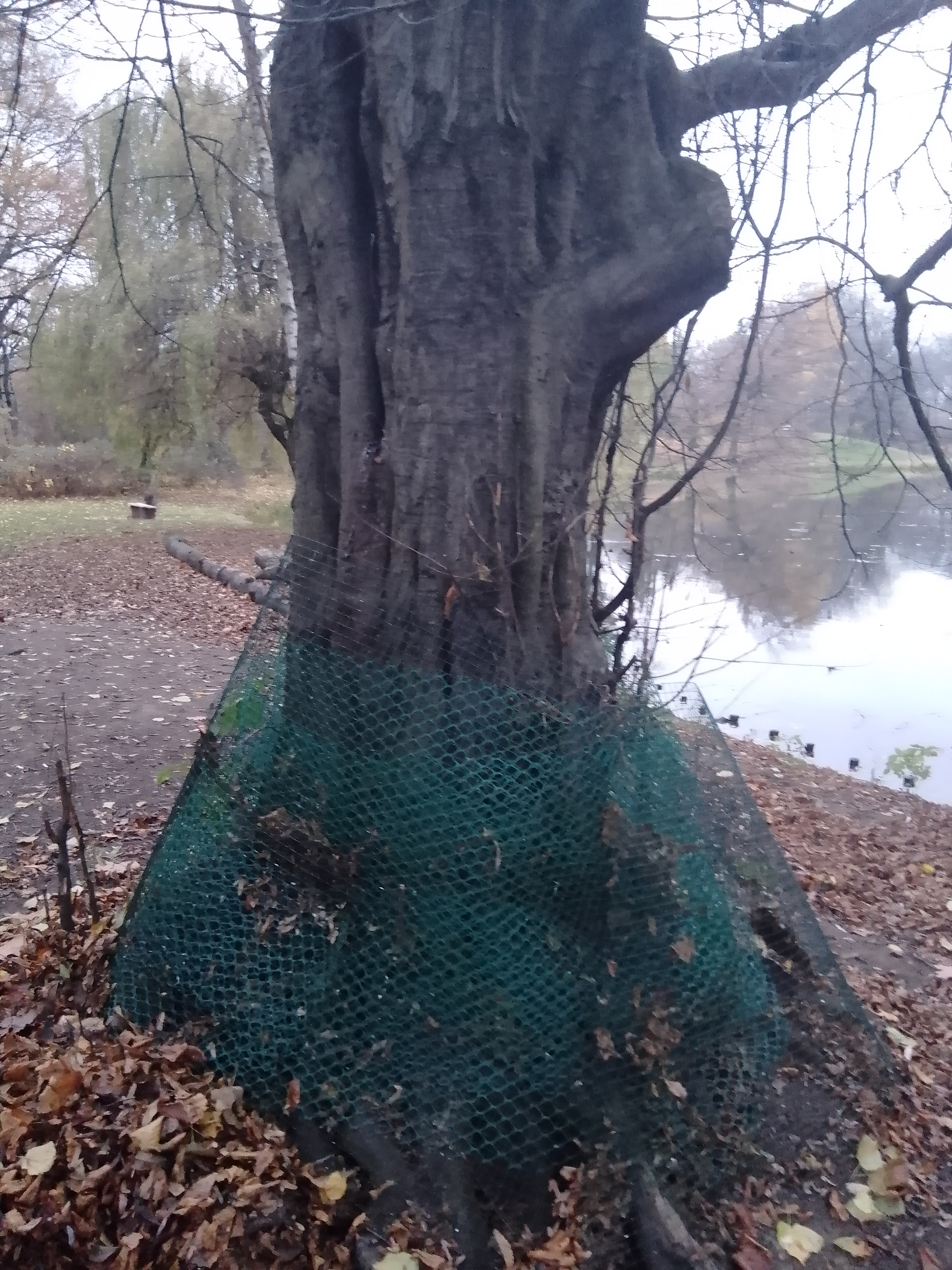
A protective net against beavers on a tree in a Warsaw park, Poland

Conventional wisdom has held that beavers girdle and fell trees and that they diminish riparian trees and vegetation, but the opposite appears to be true when studies are conducted longer-term. In 1987, Beier reported that beavers had caused local extinction of Quaking aspen (Populus tremuloides) and Black cottonwood (Populus trichocarpa) on 4–5% of stream reaches on the lower Truckee River in the Sierra Nevada mountains; however willow (Salix spp.) responded by regrowing vigorously in most reaches. He further speculated that without control of beaver populations, aspen and cottonwood could go extinct on the Truckee River. Not only have aspen and cottonwood survived ongoing beaver colonization, but a recent study of ten Sierra Nevada streams in the Lake Tahoe basin using aerial multispectral videography has also shown that deciduous, thick herbaceous, and thin herbaceous vegetation are more highly concentrated near beaver dams, whereas coniferous trees are decreased. These findings are consistent with those of Pollock, who reported that in Bridge Creek, a stream in semiarid eastern Oregon, the width of riparian vegetation on stream banks was increased several-fold as beaver dams watered previously dry terraces adjacent to the stream.

In a second study of riparian vegetation based on observations of Bridge Creek over a 17-year period, although portions of the study reach were periodically abandoned by beaver following heavy utilization of streamside vegetation, within a few years, dense stands of woody plants of greater diversity occupied a larger portion of the floodplain. Although black cottonwood and thinleaf alder did not generally resprout after beaver cutting, they frequently grew from seeds landing on freshly exposed alluvial deposits subsequent to beaver activity. Therefore, beaver appear to increase riparian vegetation given enough years to aggrade sediments and pond heights sufficiently to create widened, well-watered riparian zones, especially in areas of low summer rainfall. Beavers play an important role in seed dispersal for the water lily populations that they consume.

The surface of beaver ponds is typically at or near bank-full, so even small increases in stream flows cause the pond to overflow its banks. Thus, high stream flows spread water and nutrients beyond the stream banks to wide riparian zones when beaver dams are present.

Finally, beaver ponds may serve as critical firebreaks in fire-prone areas.

== Stream restoration ==
In the 1930s, the U.S. government put 600 beavers to work alongside the Civilian Conservation Corps in projects to stop soil erosion by streams in Oregon, Washington, Wyoming, and Utah. At the time, each beaver, whose initial cost was about $5, completed work worth an estimated $300. In 2014, a review of beaver dams as stream restoration tools proposed that an ecosystem approach using riparian plants and beaver dams could accelerate repair of incised, degraded streams versus physical manipulation of streams.

The province of Alberta published a booklet in 2016 providing information on using beaver for stream restoration.

Utah published a Beaver Management Plan which includes reestablishing beavers in ten streams per year for the purpose of watershed restoration each year from 2010 through 2020.

In a pilot study in Washington, the Lands Council is reintroducing beavers to the upper Methow River Valley in the eastern Cascades to evaluate its projections that if 10,000 miles (16,000 km) of suitable habitat were repopulated, then 650 trillion gallons of spring runoff would be held back for release in the arid autumn season. Beavers were nearly exterminated in the Methow watershed by the early 1900s by fur trappers. This project was developed in response to a 2003 Washington Department of Ecology proposal to spend as much as $10 billion on construction of several dams on Columbia River tributaries to retain storm-season runoff. As of January, 2016, 240 beavers released into the upper Methow River at 51 sites had built 176 beaver ponds, storing millions of gallons of water in this semiarid east region. One beaver that was passive integrated transponder tagged and released in the upper part of the Methow Valley, swam to the mouth of the Methow River, then up the Okanogan River almost to the Canada–US border, a journey of 120 miles (190 km).

In efforts to 'rebeaver' areas of declined beaver populations, artificial logjams have been placed. Beavers may be encouraged to build dams by the creation of a "beaver dam analog (BDA)". Initially, these were made by felling fir logs, pounding them upright into the stream bed, and weaving a lattice of willow sticks through the posts, which beavers would then expand. To minimize labor further, newer postless designs have been used, which in smaller streams, beavers can still expand into sequential dams.

=== Beaver ponds as wildlife refugia and firebreaks in wildfires ===
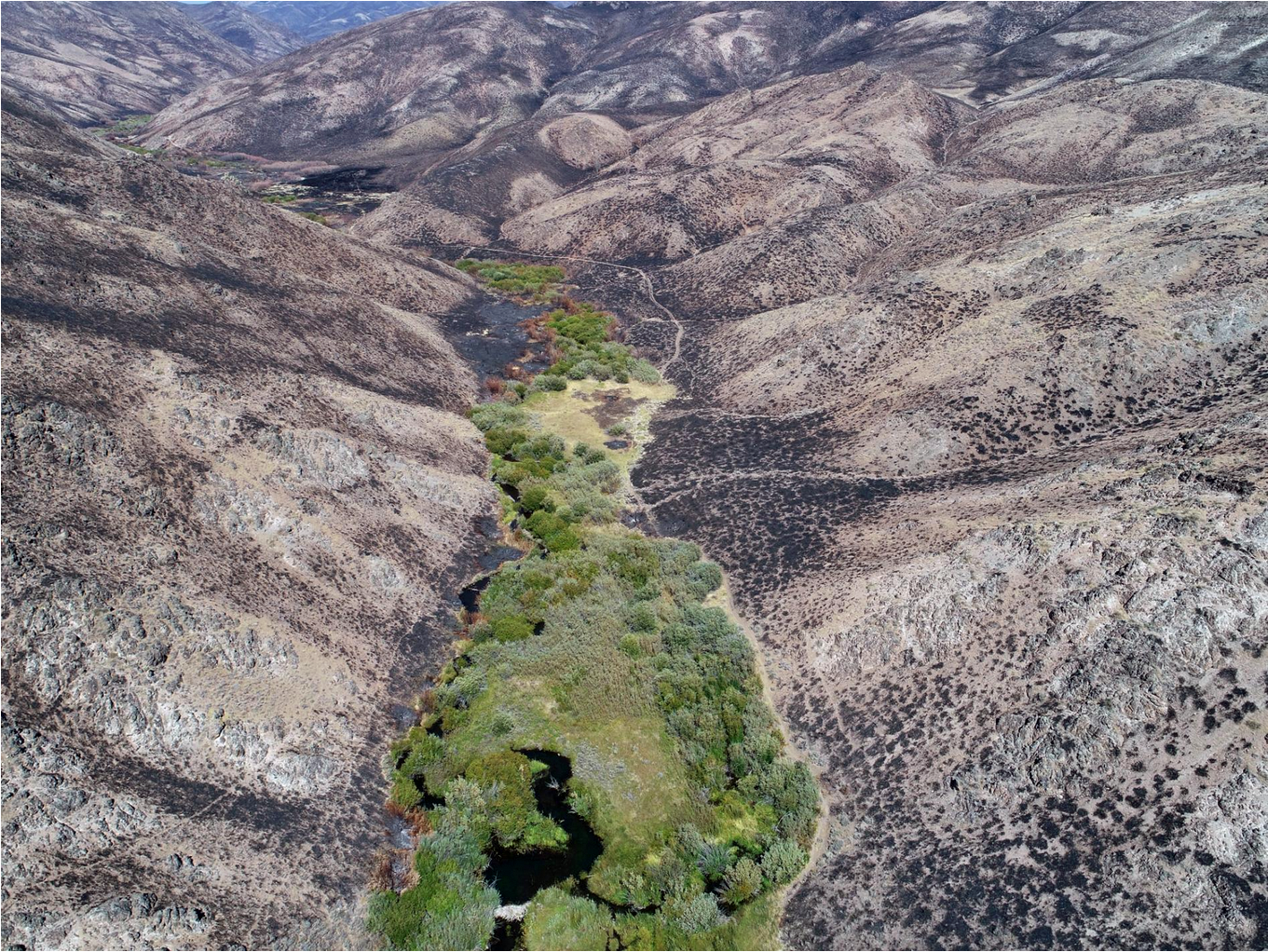
Photo of Baugh Creek, Idaho, illustrates how a string of beaver ponds in a barren, post-wildfire landscape, serves as wildlife refugia and potentially as firebreaks. Beaver dam visible at bottom of image. Courtesy of Prof. Joe Wheaton.

Beaver and their associated ponds and wetlands may be overlooked as effective wildfire-fighting tools. Eric Collier's 1959 book, Three Against the Wilderness, provides an early description of a string of beaver ponds serving as a firebreak, saving the home of his pioneer family from a wildfire in interior British Columbia. Reduction of fuel loads by beaver removal of riparian trees, increased moisture content in riparian vegetation by beaver-raised water tables, and water held in beaver ponds all act as barriers to wildfires. A study of vegetation after five large wildfires in the western United States found that riparian corridors within 330 feet (100 m) of beaver ponds were buffered from wildfires when compared to similar riparian corridors without beaver dams. One month after the Sharps Fire burned 65,000 acres (260 km^{2}) in Idaho's Blaine County in 2018, a lone surviving green ribbon of riparian vegetation along Baugh Creek was observed, (see image) illustrating how a string of beaver ponds resists wildfires, creating an "emerald refuge" for wildlife. After the 2015 Twisp River Fire burned 11,200 acres (45 km^{2}), ponds built by translocated beaver created firebreaks as evidenced by burns on one side of the river but not the other. A study of 29 beaver ponds in the Columbia River Basin found that they store an average of 1.1 million gallons of water, suggesting that beaver ponds may provide a water source for firefighters in remote areas. Lastly, two studies of the Methow River watershed, after the 2014 Carlton Complex Fire burned 256,000 acres (1,040 km^{2}) in north central Washington State, have shown that beaver dams reduced the negative impacts of wildfire on sediment runoff, reduced post-wildfire sediment and nutrient loads, and preserved both plant and macroinvertebrate communities.

== Urban beavers ==
=== Canada ===
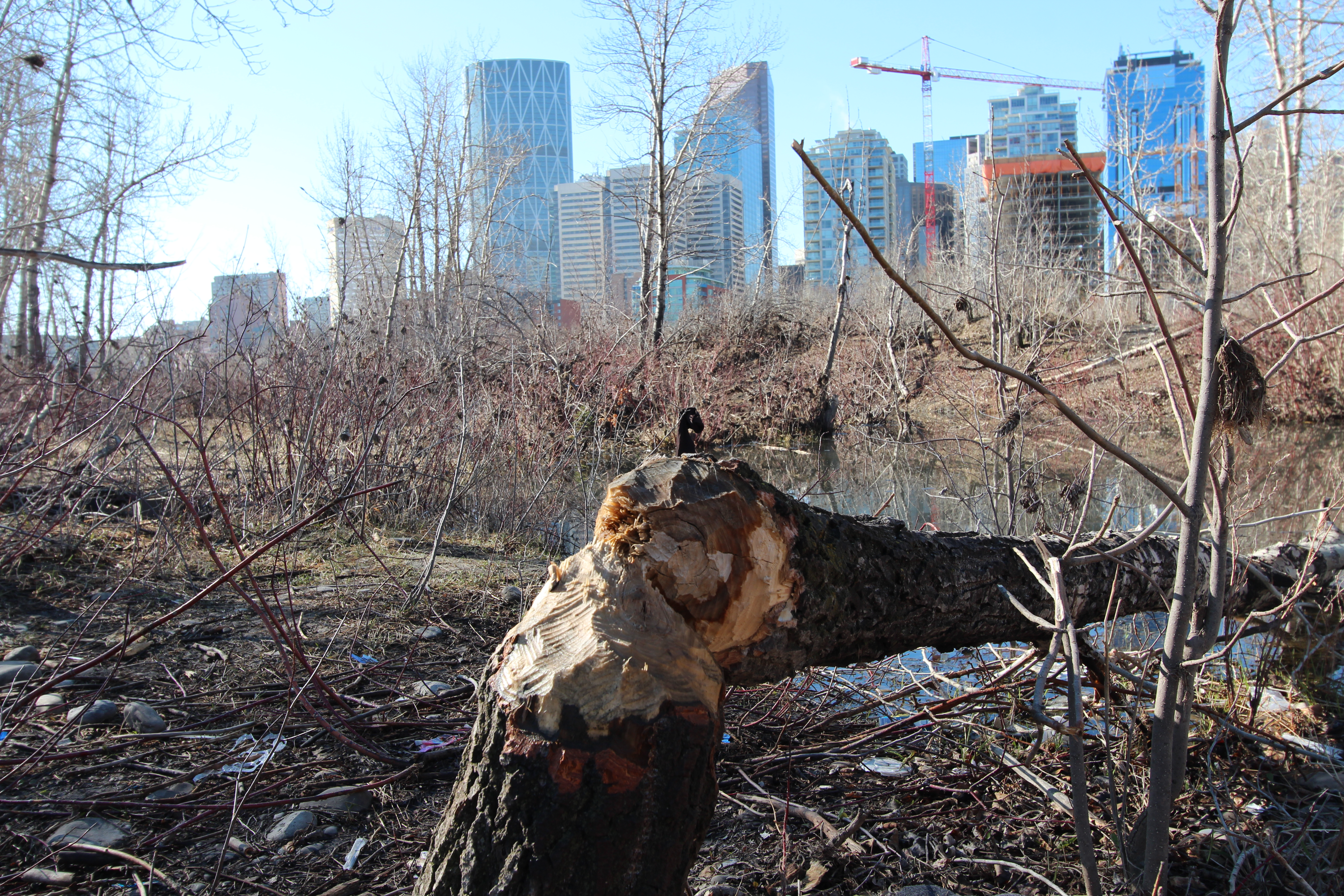
A tree felled by a beaver at Prince's Island Park in Calgary.

Several Canadian cities have seen a resurgence in its beaver population in recent decades. The beaver population in Calgary was approximately 200 in 2016, with the majority of the population located near the Bow, and Elbow River. When required, the city of Calgary will use a combination of methods to prevent beaver damage to trees and river parks. Methods of damage prevention includes the placement of a mesh wire fence around the tree trunk, planting trees less palatable to beavers near shorelines, placing under-dam drainage systems to control water levels; and placing traps designed to kill instantly, as Alberta Environment and Parks does not allow the relocation of caught beavers to other areas.

Beavers have occasionally wandered into Downtown Ottawa, including Parliament Hill, Major's Hill Park, and Sparks Street. Beavers caught in the urban core of Ottawa by the National Capital Commission's conservation team are typically brought to a wildlife centre, and later released near the Ottawa River, close to the Greenbelt. In 2011, the city of Ottawa began to trap beavers taking up residence in the stormwater pond in the Stittsville neighbourhood. Ottawa is situated 2.5 miles (4 km) south of the southern entrance to Gatineau Park. Located on the Quebec side of the Ottawa River, the park is home to one of North America's densest populations of beavers, with more than 1,100 beavers in 272 beaver colonies according to a 2011 aerial inventory of the park. The beaver population at Gatineau Park is monitored by the National Capital Commission in an effort to protect local infrastructure, and maintain public safety.

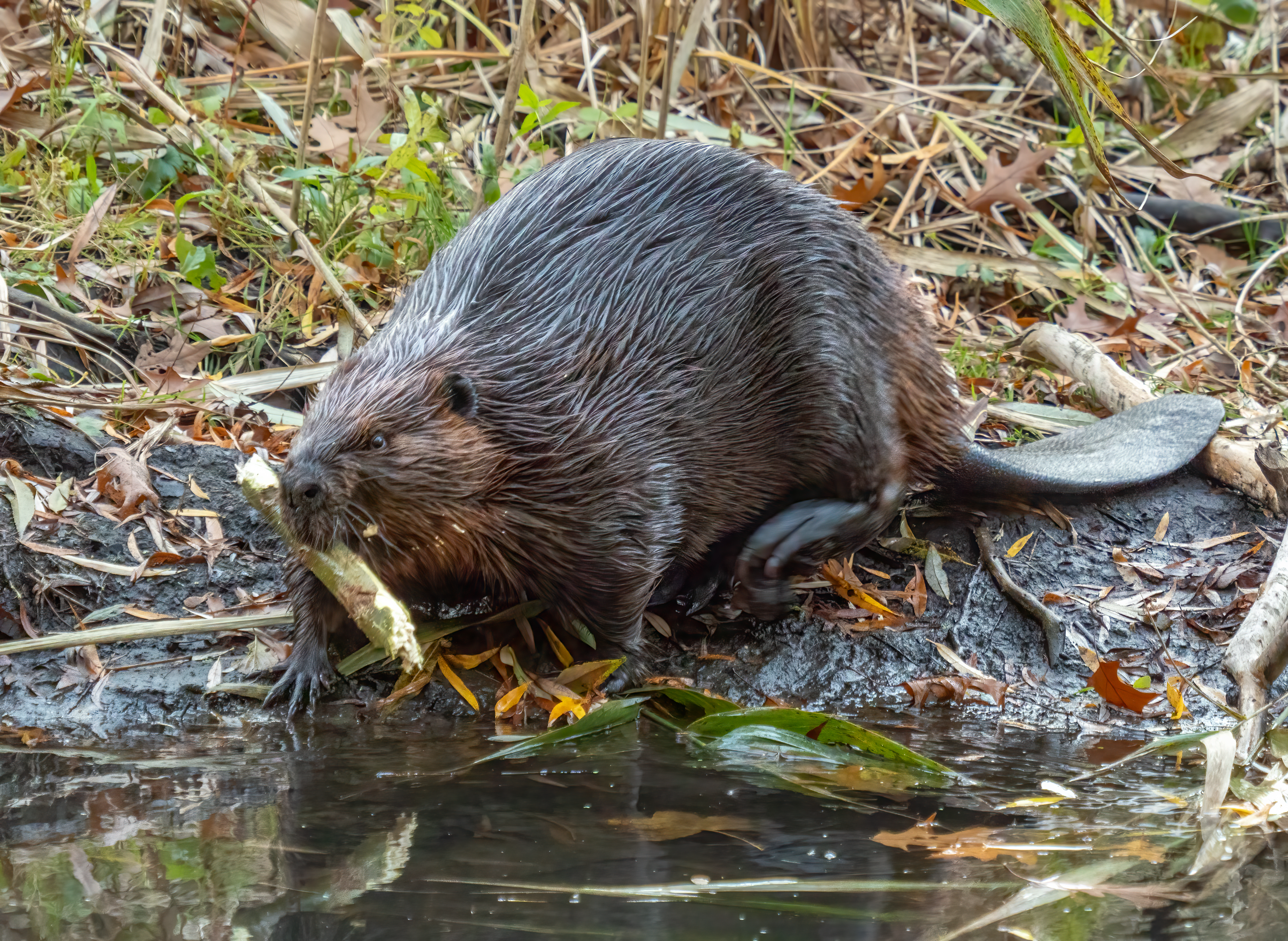
A beaver swimming in High Park, Toronto. Beavers make their way through the city by traversing the city's waterways.

The city of Toronto government, and the Toronto and Region Conservation Authority (TRCA) do not keep track of the number of beavers residing in Toronto, although an estimate from 2001 places the local beaver population at several hundred. Beavers are commonly found along the shoreline of Lake Ontario, and make their way throughout the waterway corridors of the city, most notably the Don, Humber, and Rouge River; the ravine system adjacent to the waterways, and the Toronto Islands. The city of Toronto government does not have any plans to either control the spread, or contain the number of beavers in the city. The city's urban forestry department will occasionally install heavy mesh wire fences around the trunks of trees to prevent them from being damaged by beavers. In 2013, flow devices were installed along the Rouge River, to prevent beaver dams from flooding the river. Prior to their installation, beavers whose dams caused the river to flood were trapped. In a 2017 TRCA report on local occurrences of fauna in Greater Toronto, beavers were given a score of L4. The score was given to species whose populations were secure in the rural portions of Greater Toronto, but whose populations in the urban areas of Greater Toronto remained vulnerable to potential long-term decline of its habitats.

Several dozen beavers were estimated to inhabit Vancouver in 2016. Beavers have inhabited Jericho Beach as early as 2000, although they did not move into the other areas of Vancouver until later in that decade. After an 80-year absence, a beaver was spotted in Stanley Park's Beaver Lake in 2008. In 2016, five beavers inhabited Beaver Lake. In the same year, a pair of beavers built a dam in Hinge Park. The Vancouver Park Board approved a strategy that included plans to promote the growth of the beaver population near the Olympic Village in 2016.

Beavers in Winnipeg numbered around 100 in 2019, and live along the city's rivers and streams. After receiving complaints for beaver-related damages in 2012, the city of Winnipeg has placed mesh wire fence around tree trunks along the shore of the Assiniboine River during the winter; as well as laid down traps designed to kill the beavers. Like Alberta, provincial guidelines in Manitoba do not allow for the live capture and relocation of beavers. The city employs one contractor 10 times a year to manage the beaver population in Winnipeg, who is authorized to remove beavers with a firearm under Manitoba's Wildlife Act.

=== United States ===
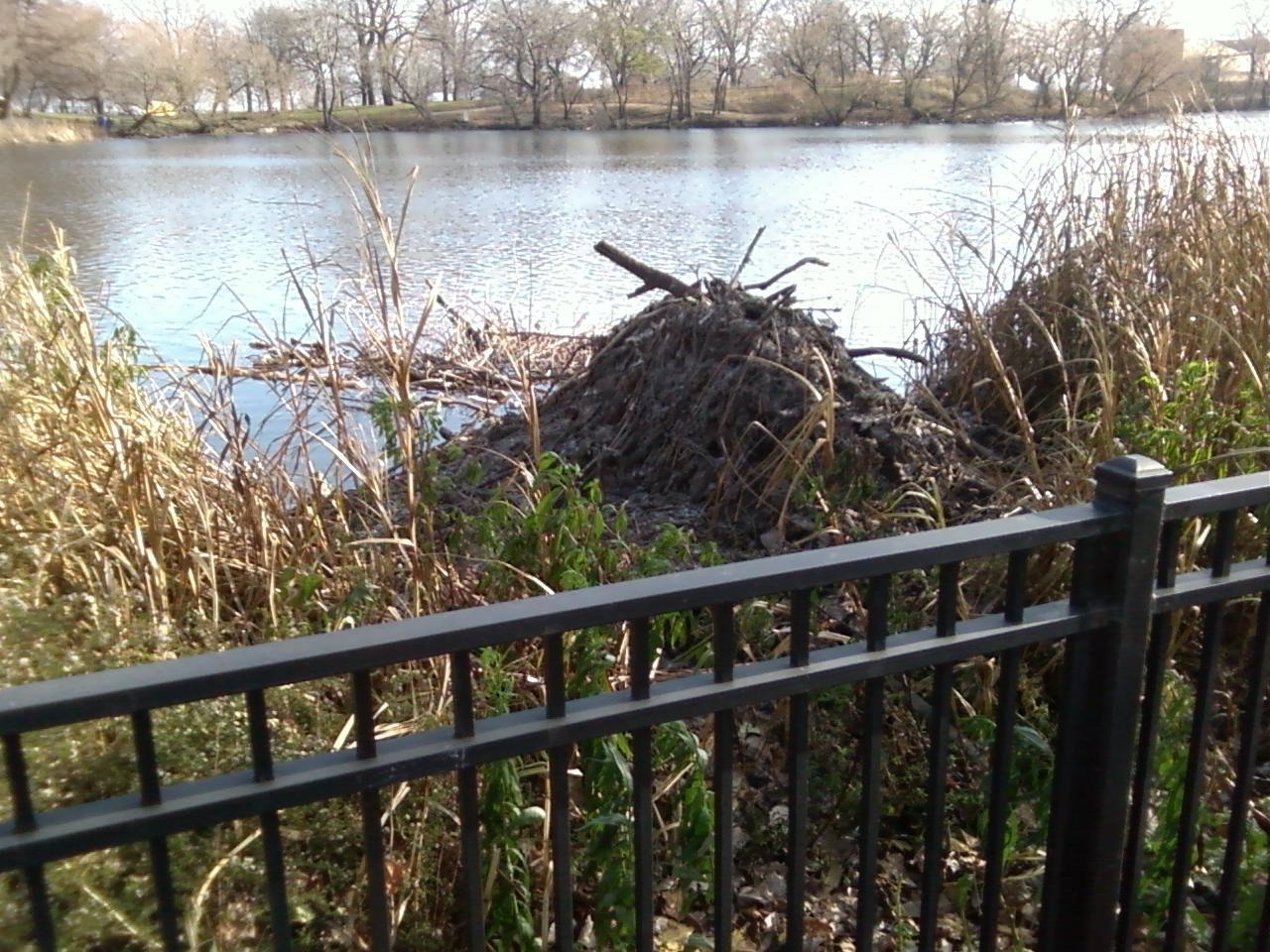
A beaver lodge in Lincoln Park, Chicago, in the fall of 2009

Several cities in the United States have seen the reintroduction of beavers within their city limits. In Chicago, several beavers have returned and made a home near the Lincoln Park's North Pond. The "Lincoln Park beaver" has not been as well received by the Chicago Park District and the Lincoln Park Conservancy, which was concerned over damage to trees in the area. In March 2009, they hired an exterminator to remove a beaver family using live traps, and accidentally killed the mother when she got caught in a snare and drowned. Relocation costs $4,000–$4,500 per animal. Scott Garrow, District Wildlife Biologist with the Illinois Department of Natural Resources, opined that relocating the beavers may be "a waste of time", as beaver recolonizing North Pond in Lincoln Park has been recorded in 1994, 2003, 2004, 2008, 2009, 2014, and 2018

In downtown Martinez, California, a male and female beaver arrived in Alhambra Creek in 2006. The Martinez beavers built a dam 30 feet wide and at one time 6 feet high, and chewed through half the willows and other creekside landscaping the city planted as part of its $9.7 million 1999 flood-improvement project. When the City Council wanted to remove the beavers because of fears of flooding, local residents organized to protect them, forming an organization called "Worth a Dam". Resolution included installation of a flow device through the beaver dam so that the pond's water level could not become excessive. Now protected, the beavers have transformed Alhambra Creek from a trickle into multiple dams and beaver ponds, which in turn, led to the return of steelhead trout and river otter in 2008, and mink in 2009. The Martinez beavers probably originated from the Sacramento-San Joaquin River Delta, which once held the largest concentration of beavers in North America.

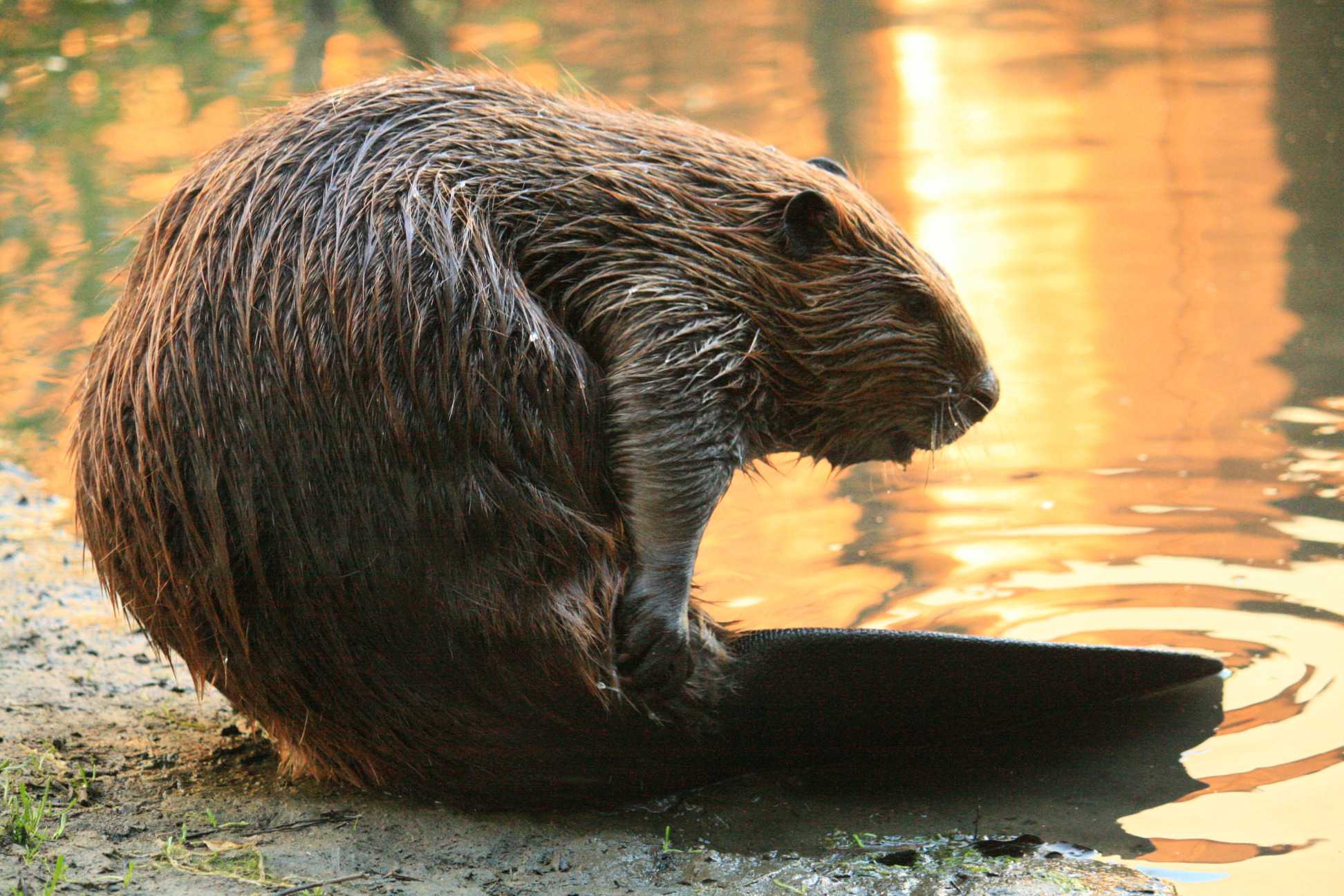
A beaver grooming itself near the Alhambra Creek, in Martinez, California.

After 200 years, a lone beaver returned to New York City in 2007, making its home along the Bronx River, having spent time living at the Bronx Zoo and the Botanical Gardens. Though beaver pelts were once important to the city's economy and a pair of beavers appears on the city's official seal and flag, beavers had not lived in New York City since the early 19th century, when trappers extirpated them completely from the city. The return of "José", named after Representative José Serrano from the Bronx, has been seen as evidence that efforts to restore the river have been successful. In the summer of 2010, a second beaver named "Justin" joined José, doubling the beaver population in New York City. In February 2013, what appears to be both José and Justin were caught on motion-sensitive cameras at the New York Botanical Garden.

In 1999, Washington, D.C.'s annual Cherry Blossom Festival included a family of beavers that lived in the Tidal Basin. The animals were caught and removed, but not before damaging 14 cherry trees, including some of the largest and oldest trees.

== Arctic impacts ==
As of 2022 rapidly increasing temperatures in northern latitudes had resulted in increasingly favorable conditions for beaver as availability of woody vegetation increased and permafrost melted releasing large volumes of water. Increased open water in ponds may increase warming and rapid ecological changes may disrupt fish populations and the harvests of indigenous hunter-gatherers. Increases in beaver and beaver dams interact intimately with thermokarst ponds and lakes. Beavers sometimes build dams at the outlets of thermokarst lakes and in the dried beds of thermokarst depressions as well as in beaded form along streams.

== Invasive impacts ==
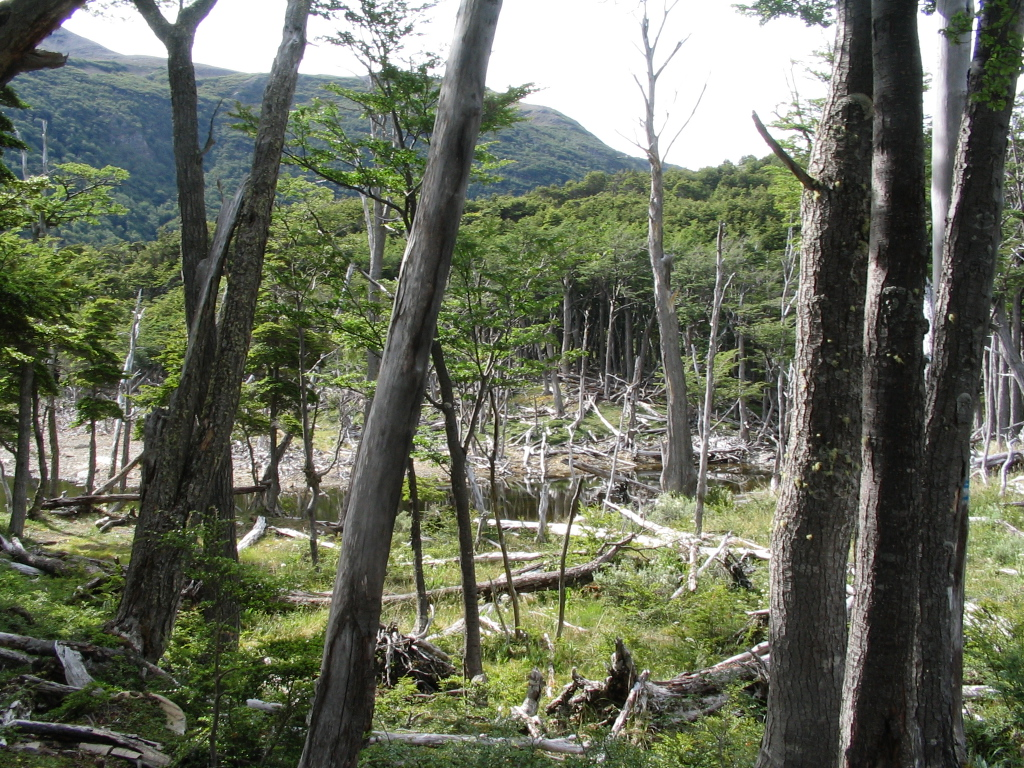
Beaver damage on the north shore of Robalo Lake, Navarino Island, Chile

In the 1940s, beavers were brought to Tierra del Fuego in southern Chile and Argentina for commercial fur production and introduced near Fagnano Lake. Although the fur enterprise failed, 25 pairs of beavers were released into the wild. Having no natural predators in their new environment, they quickly spread throughout the main island, and to other islands in the archipelago, reaching some 100,000 individuals within 50 years. Although they have been considered an invasive species, it has been more recently shown that the beaver has some beneficial ecological effects on native fish and should not be considered wholly detrimental. Although the dominant Lenga beech (Nothofagus pumilio) forest can regenerate from stumps, most of the newly created beaver wetlands are being colonized by the rarer native Antarctic beech (Nothofagus antarctica). It is not known whether the shrubbier Antarctic beech will be succeeded by the originally dominant and larger Lengo beech; however, the beaver wetlands are readily colonized by non-native plant species. In contrast, areas with introduced beaver were associated with increased populations of the native catadromous puye fish (Galaxias maculatus). Furthermore, the beavers did not seem to have a highly beneficial impact on the exotic brook trout (Salvelinus fontinalis) and rainbow trout (Oncorhynchus mykiss) which have negative impacts on native stream fishes in the Cape Horn Biosphere Reserve, Chile. They have also been found to cross saltwater to islands northward; and reached the Chilean mainland in the 1990s. On balance, most favour their removal because of their landscape-wide modifications to the Fuegian environment and because biologists want to preserve the unique biota of the region.

== See also ==
- Beaver drop

== Bibliography ==
Goldfarb, Ben (2019). Eager - The Surprising, Secret Life of Beavers and Why They Matter. Chelsea Green Publishing.
