= Martinez beavers =

Family of rodents

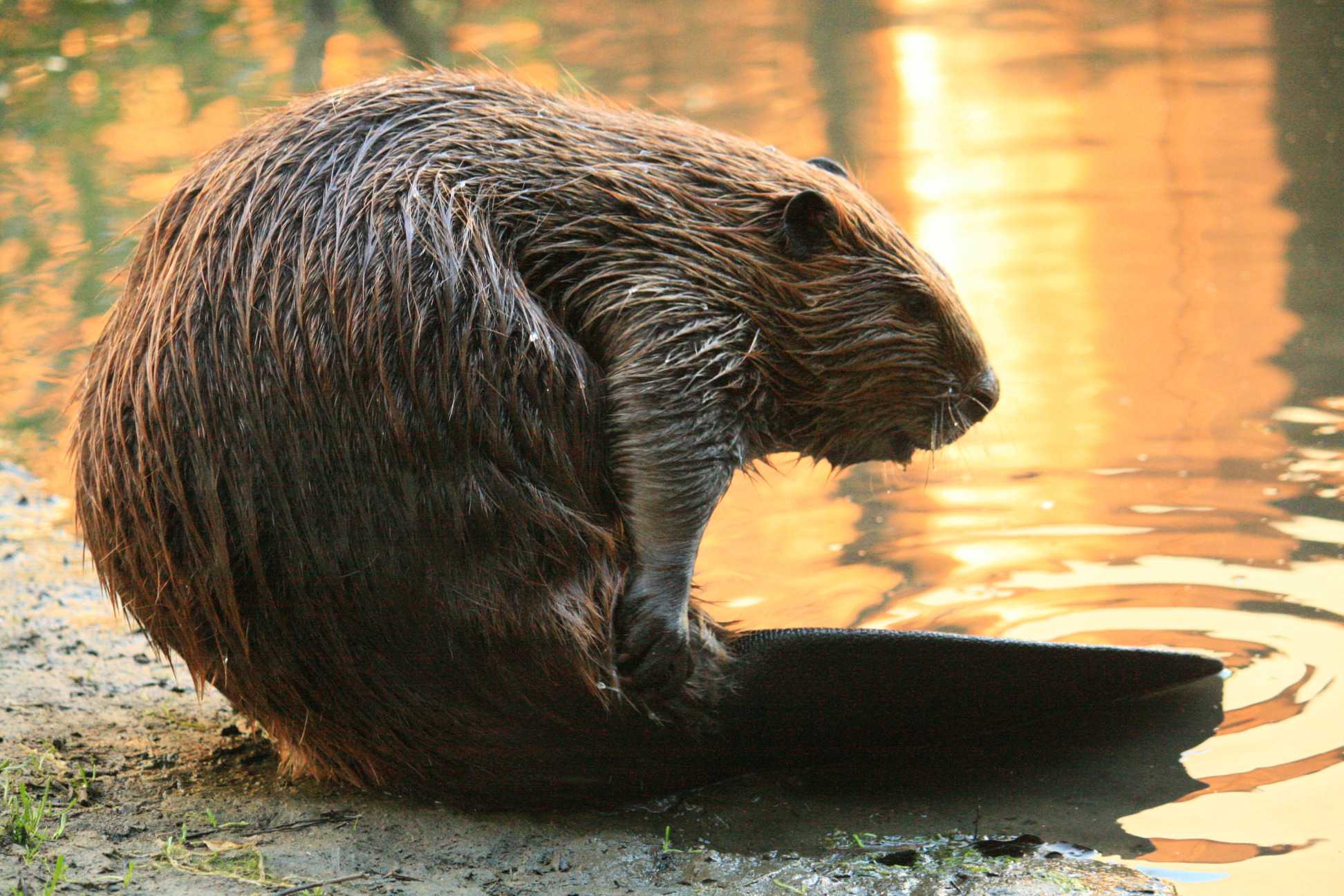
Yearling beaver in Alhambra Creek

The Martinez beavers are a family of North American beavers living in Alhambra Creek in downtown Martinez, California. Best known as the longtime home of famed 19th/20th-century naturalist John Muir, Martinez has become a national example of urban stream restoration utilizing beavers as ecosystem engineers.

In late 2006, a male and female beaver arrived in Alhambra Creek, proceeding to produce 4 kits over the course of the summer. After a decision by the city of Martinez to exterminate the beavers, local conservationists formed an organization called Worth a Dam and as a result of their activism, the decision was overturned. Subsequently, wildlife populations have increased in diversity along the Alhambra Creek watershed, most likely due to the dams maintained by the beavers.

== Alhambra Creek ==
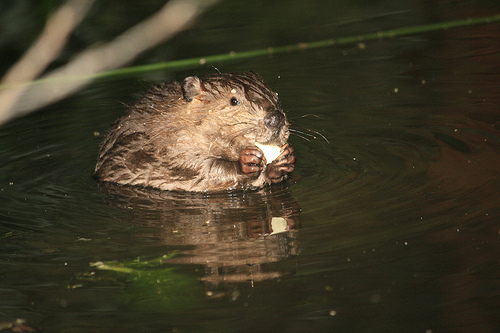
Three-week-old beaver kit swimming in Alhambra Creek in June, 2010

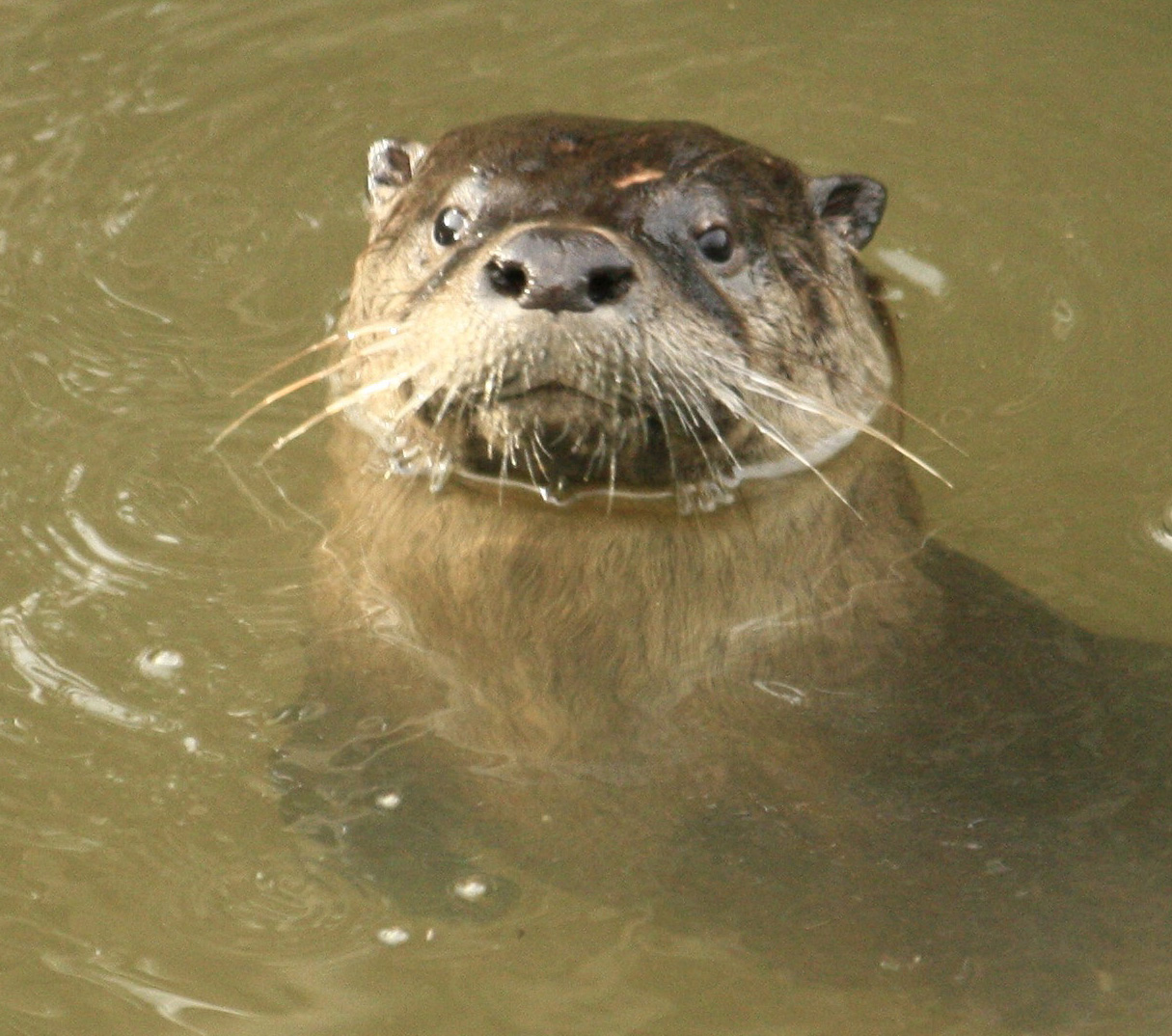
River otter returns to Alhambra Creek beaver pond 2008

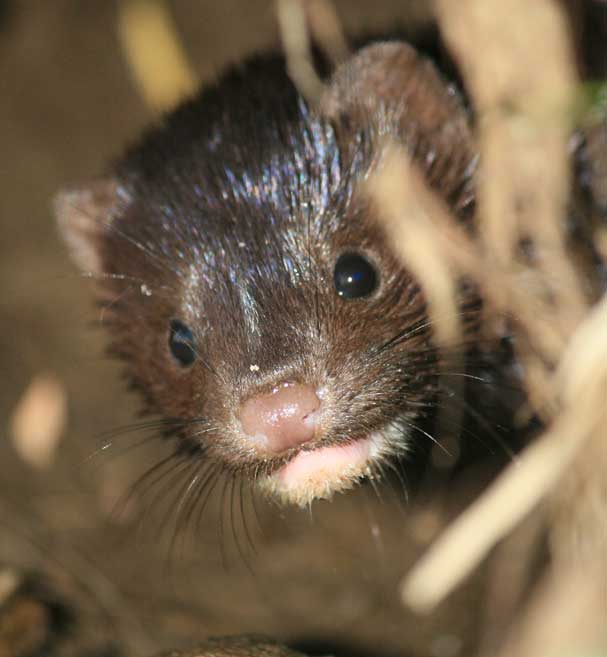
Mink returns to Alhambra Creek beaver pond 2009

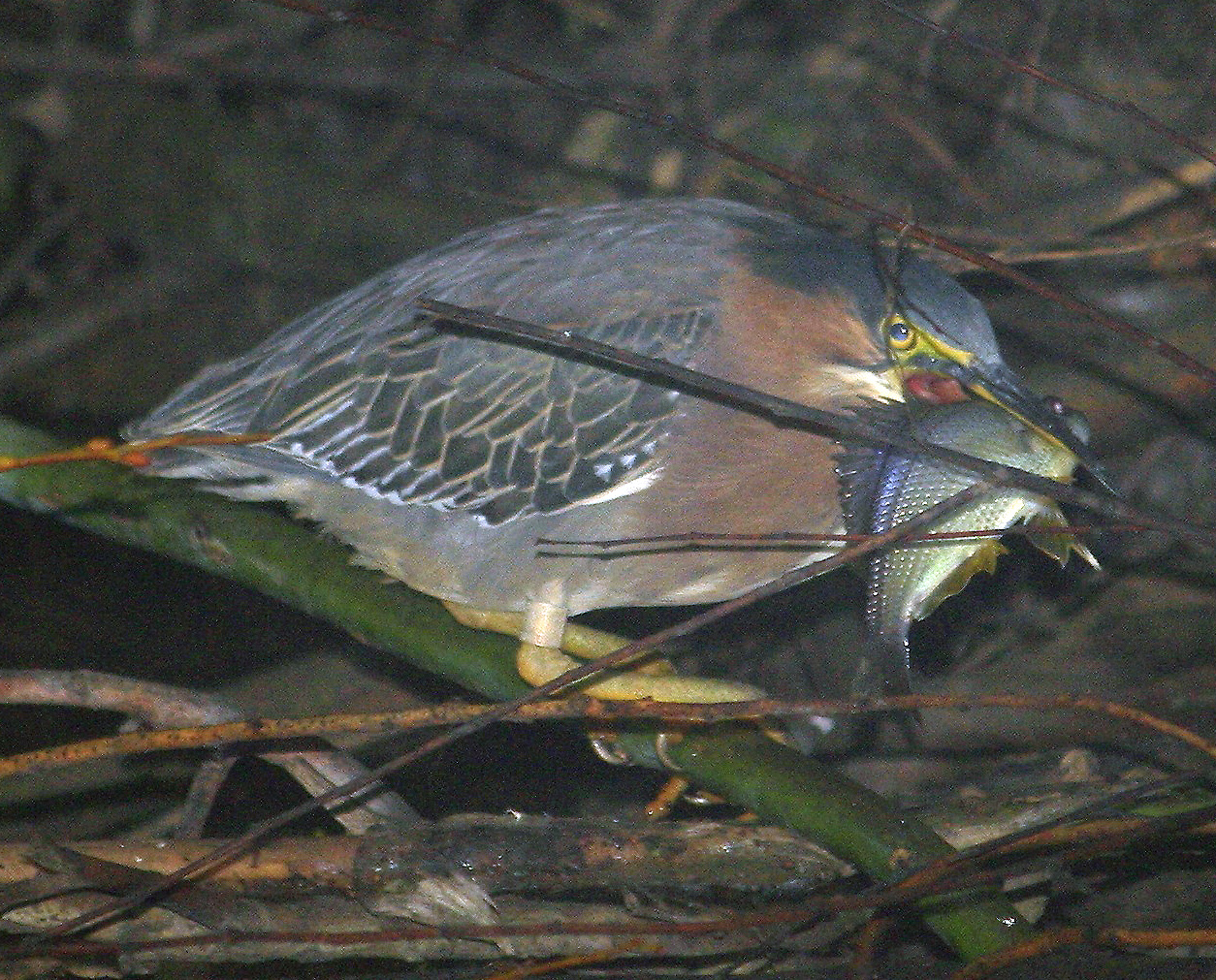
Green heron eating first recorded tule perch in Alhambra Creek

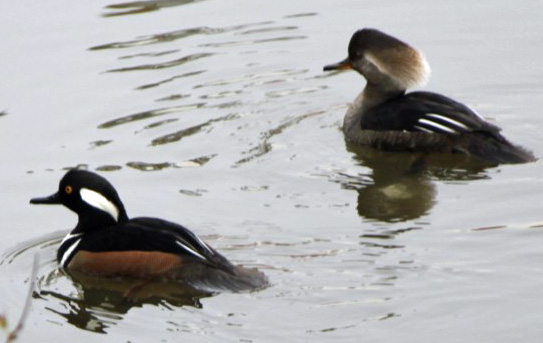
Hooded mergansers return to beaver pond December 2010

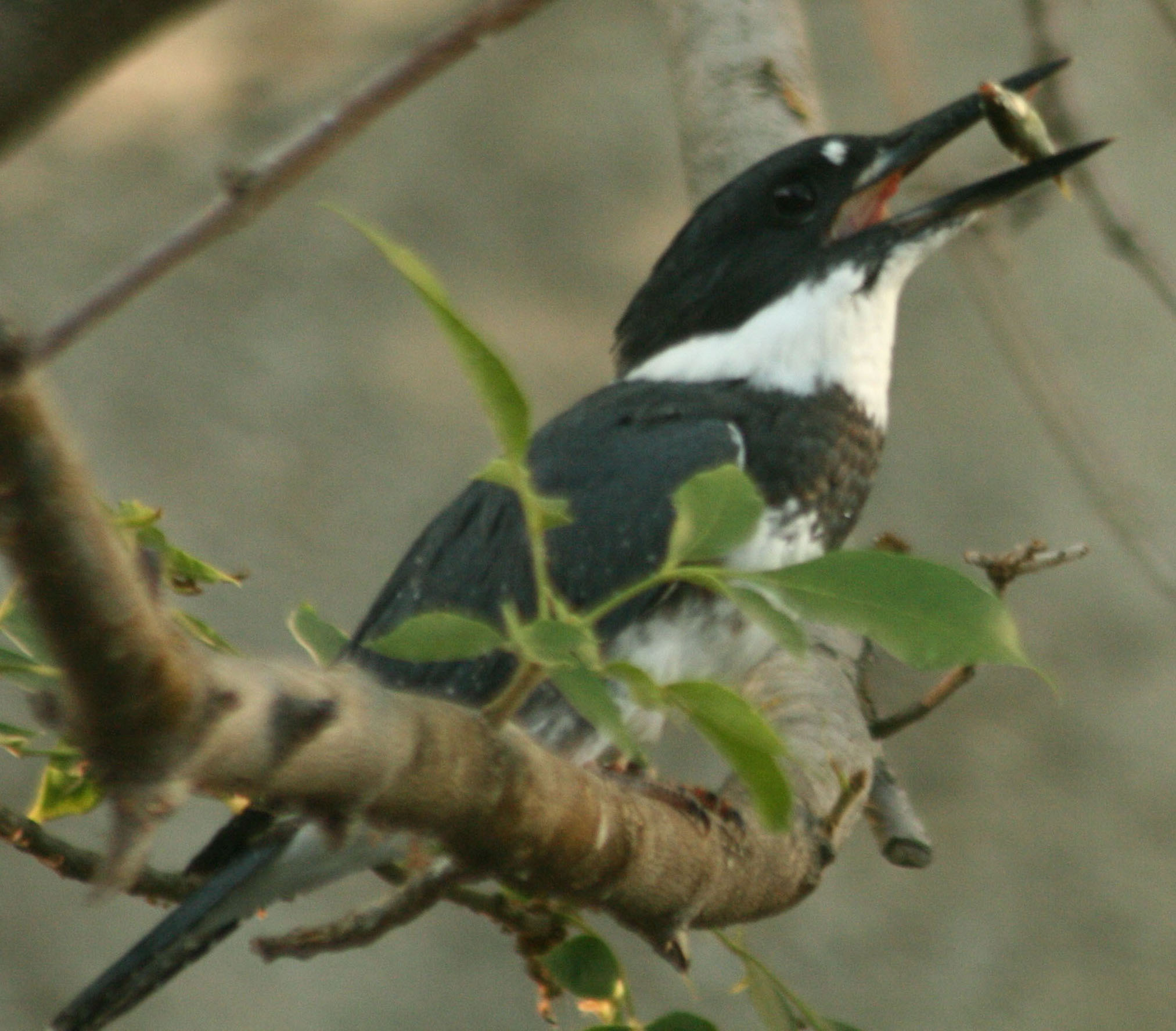
Belted kingfisher eating fish above Alhambra Creek beaver pond

In late 2006, Alhambra Creek, which runs through the city of Martinez, was adopted by two beavers. The beavers built a dam 30 feet wide and at one time 6 feet high, and chewed through half the willows and other creekside landscaping the city planted as part of its US$9.7 million 1999 flood-improvement project (after a flood in 1997).

In November 2007, the city declared that the risk of flooding from the dam necessitated removal of the beavers. Since the California Department of Fish and Game (DFG) does not allow relocation, extermination was the only solution. Residents voiced objections, prompting a beaver vigil and rally, as well as local media interest. Within three days of the announcement of the decision to exterminate the beavers, downtown Martinez was invaded by news cameras and curious spectators. Because of the public outcry, the city obtained an exception from DFG, who pledged to pay for their successful relocation. This 11th-hour decision relieved much of the tension, but residents continued to press the city to allow the beavers to stay. In a heavily attended city council meeting, the city was alternately praised for gaining the DFG exception and chided for not researching effective flood control measures. Concerns of downtown shopkeepers were raised, but strategies for flow management were mentioned by most. Offers of help came from the Sierra Club, the Humane Society, the Superintendent of schools and many private residents.

After this meeting, Mayor Robert Schroder formed a subcommittee dedicated to the beavers. The city hired Skip Lisle of Beaver Deceivers in Vermont to install a flow device. Resolution included installing a pipe through the beaver dam so that the pond's water level could not become excessive. The flow device, as of 2013, was controlling the water level well.

A keystone species, the beaver have transformed Alhambra Creek from a trickle into multiple dams and beaver ponds, which in turn, has led to the return of steelhead trout (Oncorhynchus mykiss) and river otter (Lontra canadensis) in 2008, and mink (Neovison vison) in 2009. Examples of the impact of the beaver as a keystone species in 2010, include a green heron (Butorides virescens) catching a tule perch (Hysterocarpus traskii traskii), the first recorded sighting of the perch in Alhambra Creek, and the December arrival of a pair of hooded mergansers (Lophodytes cucullatus) (see photos). The beaver parents have produced babies every year since their 2006 arrival.

In November, 2009 the Martinez City Council approved the placement of an 81-tile wildlife mural on the Escobar Street bridge. The mural was created by schoolchildren and donated by Worth a Dam to memorialize the beavers and other fauna in Alhambra Creek. In June, 2010, after birthing and successfully weaning triplets that year (and quadruplets the previous three years), "Mom Beaver" died of infection caused by a broken tooth, as confirmed by necropsy.

In 2011, a new adult female arrived at the creek and has given birth to three beavers. Flooding, following heavy rains, washed away the beaver lodge and all four dams on Alhambra Creek in March 2011

In September, 2011, Martinez officials ordered Mario Alfaro, a local artist commissioned to paint an outdoor mural celebrating the heritage of the city, to paint over the depiction of a beaver he had included in his panorama. He complied and also painted over his own name in apparent protest.

In 2014, the beaver population of the creek was seven. From 2006 to 2014, a total of 22 beavers lived in the creek at various times; of these, 8 died, 7 are still living in the creek, and the fate of the other 7 is unknown.

From 2008 to 2025, there has been an annual Beaver Festival in Martinez.

== History ==
The Martinez beavers probably originated from the Sacramento-San Joaquin River Delta. Historically, before the California Fur Rush of the late eighteenth and early nineteenth centuries, the Delta probably held the largest concentration of beaver in North America. It was California's early fur trade, more than any other single factor, that opened up the West, and the San Francisco Bay Area in particular, to world trade. The Spanish, French, English, Russians and Americans engaged in the California fur trade before 1825, harvesting prodigious quantities of beaver, river otter, marten, fisher, mink, fox, weasel, harbor and fur seals and sea otter. When the coastal and oceanic fur industry began to decline, the focus shifted to California's inland fur resources. Between 1826 and 1845 the Hudson's Bay Company sent parties out annually from Fort Astoria and Fort Vancouver into the Sacramento and the San Joaquin valleys as far south as French Camp on the San Joaquin River. These trapping expeditions must have been extremely profitable to justify the long overland trip each year. It appears that the beaver (species: Castor canadensis, subspecies: subauratus) was one of the most valued of the animals taken, and apparently was found in great abundance. Thomas McKay reported that in one year the Hudson's Bay Company took 4,000 beaver skins on the shores of San Francisco Bay. At the time, these pelts sold for $2.50 a pound or about $4 each.

The Delta area is probably where McKay was so successful, rather than the Bay itself. In 1840, explorer Captain Thomas Farnham wrote that beaver were very numerous near the mouths of the Sacramento and San Joaquin rivers and on the hundreds of small "rushcovered" islands. Farnham, who had travelled extensively in North America, said: "There is probably no spot of equal extent in the whole continent of America which contains so many of these muchsought animals."

== See also ==
- Beaver in the Sierra Nevada
