= Flow device =

Device used to control water levels

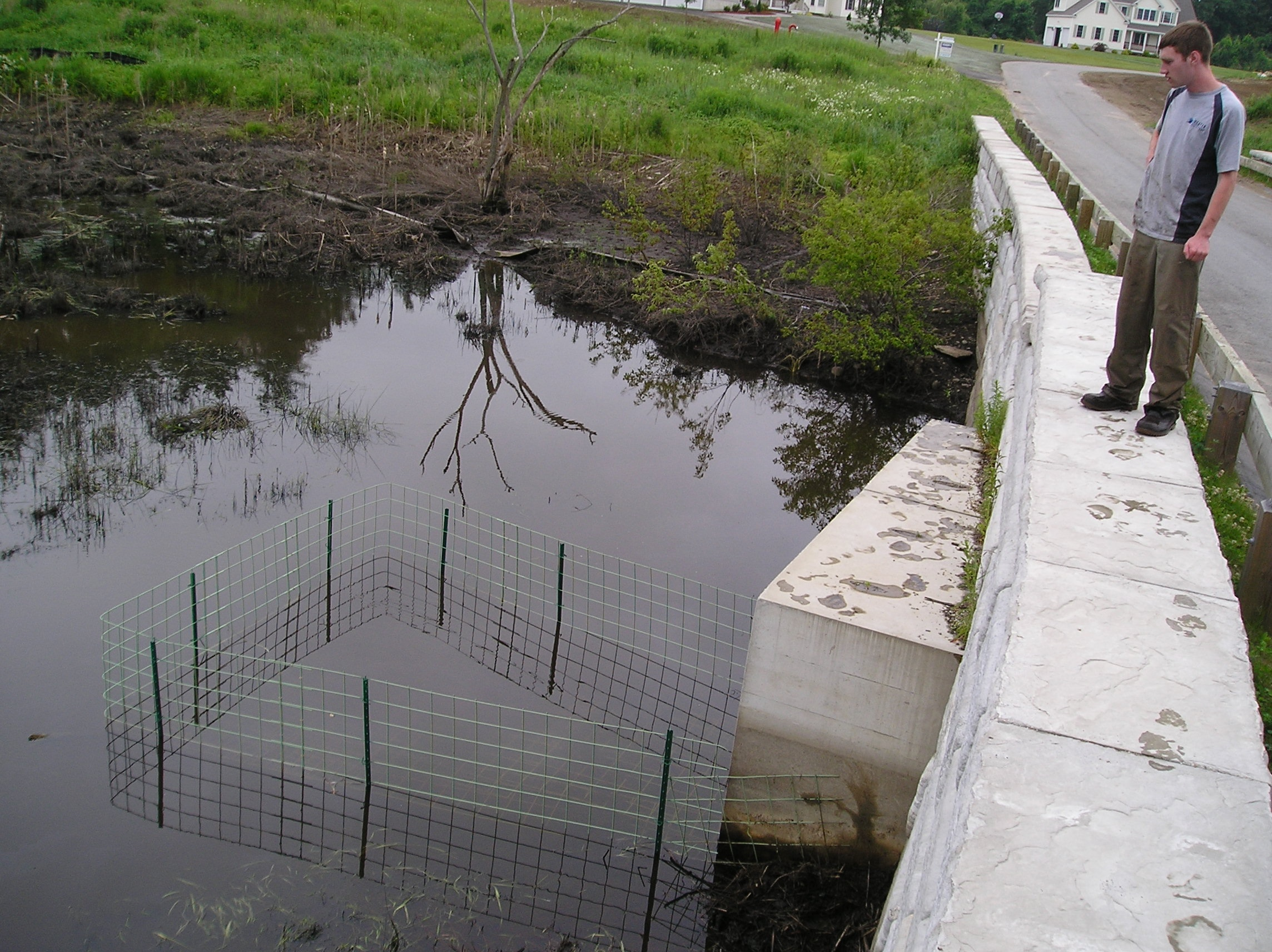
Trapezoidal protective fence installed after re-opening dammed culvert

Flow devices (also known as beaver deceivers) are human-made solutions to beaver-related flooding problems. Flow devices are relatively cost-effective, low-maintenance solutions that regulate the water level of beaver dams and keep culverts open. Traditional solutions have involved the trapping and removal of all the beavers in an area. While this is sometimes necessary, it is typically a short-lived solution as beavers rapidly recolonize suitable habitat.

The most common beaver-related flooding issues that people encounter are caused by blocked road culverts or freestanding beaver dams. Beaver-related flooding issues can usually be resolved with properly designed and installed water control devices, also known as flow devices. Flow devices are either specially designed pipes installed through beaver dams, or pipe and/or fence systems that protect road culverts from being blocked. The beneficial effects of beavers on stream flow, riparian habitat, salmon and trout, and wetland creation can be sustained with application of these inexpensive technologies, which require little maintenance.

== Background ==
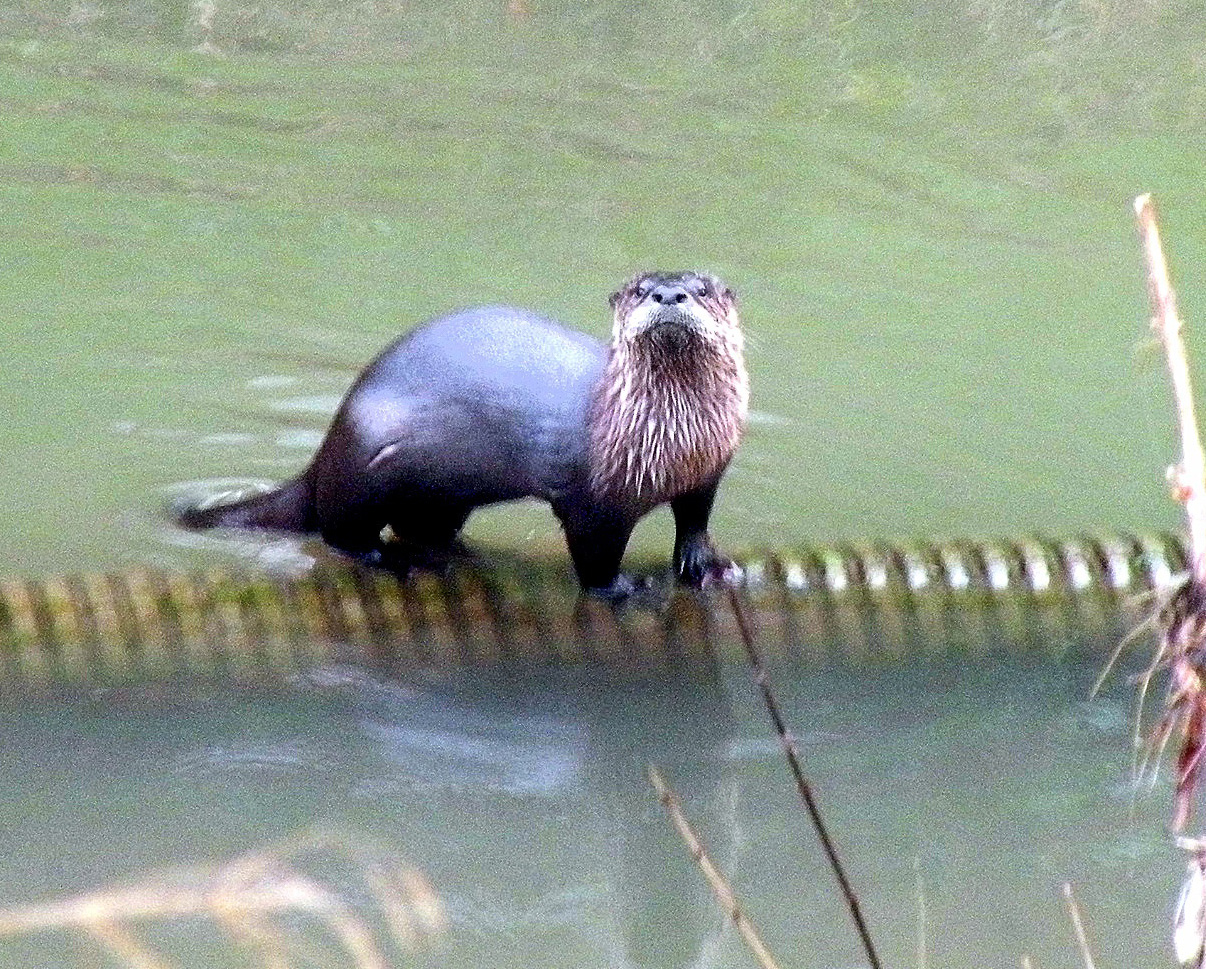
River otter standing on beaver pond flow device in urban Alhambra Creek

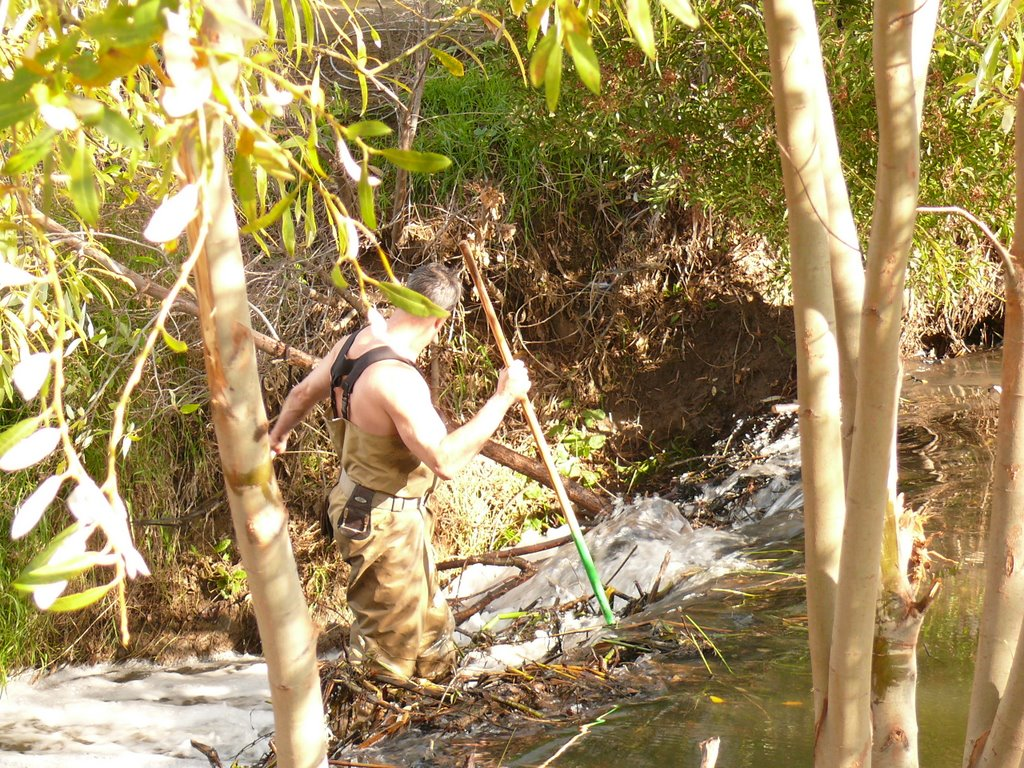
Re-opening beaver dam to install pipe leveler to regulate height of beaver pond in downtown Martinez, California

Beavers faced near extinction from unregulated trapping across North America during the early to mid-nineteenth century. This caused widespread environmental damage including the drying up of many streams and rivers formerly sustained by the high water tables associated with beaver dams. In addition, beavers create wetlands which increase biodiversity and improve water quality by removing sediment and pollutants. In fire-prone areas, beaver ponds serve as fire breaks. Salmon and trout easily cross beaver dams and scientific evidence shows that fish size and fish populations are larger when beaver are present. A keystone species, beavers create habitat for numerous other species, as exemplified by ponds in Martinez, California, by a new beaver colony in 2007. This led to the return of numerous birds, steelhead trout (Oncorhynchus mykiss), river otter (Lontra canadensis) in 2008, and mink (Neogale vison) in 2009.

== History ==
In 1952, the concept of installing perforated pipes in dams was introduced to control water levels at the Northeastern Wildlife Conference as a solution for problem beaver ponds. In 1963, Laramie reported that the New Hampshire Fish and Game Department had successfully installed and maintained beaver pipes in 46 dams. In 1978, the New York State Department of Environmental Conservation began designing and testing various culvert protection devices, of which the T-culvert guard was the most effective and cost-beneficial. In 1992, Clemson University developed the Clemson Beaver Pond Leveler, a device that prevented beavers from damming areas of concern by directing water through existing dams using a strategically designed pipe system. Over the years, these designs have been modified and improved in order to address flow problems that occur in a variety of different landscapes. The most recent innovations in flow devices combine fencing techniques which exclude beaver with pipe systems which do deceive beavers.

A 2006 survey found that trapping as a solution to beaver problems had a 79% failure rate within two years due to resettlement by new beavers. A 2006 study by the Virginia Department of Transportation found that for every $1 spent on flow-device installation relative to historical preventive maintenance, road repairs, and beaver population control activities, $8 was saved, for a return on investment of nearly 8:1.

== Methods ==
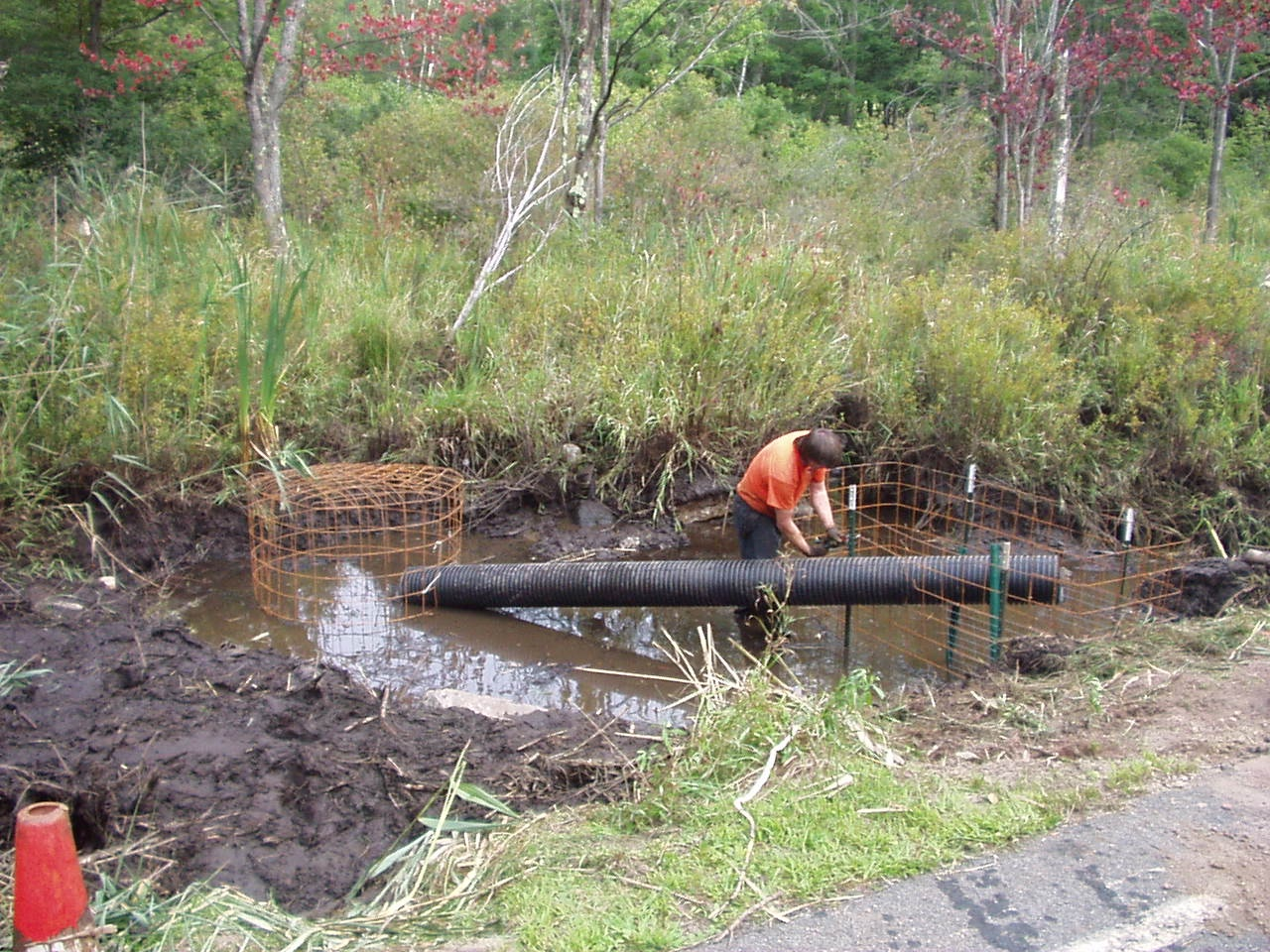
Before: Culvert fence and pond leveler pipe system installed with beaver pond drained

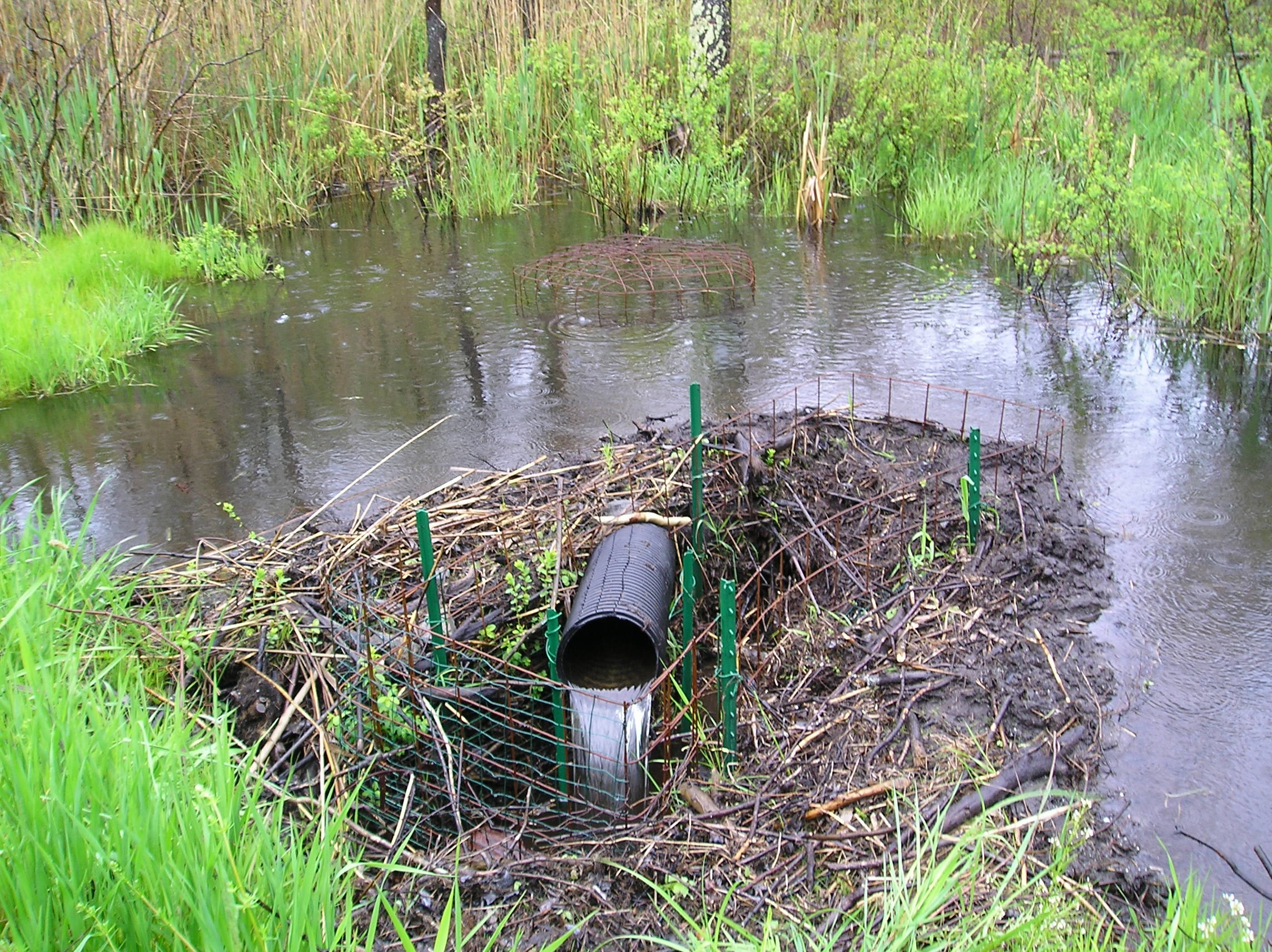
After: Culvert fence and pond leveler pipe after beaver re-build their dam

=== Beaver dam pipes ===
Beavers diligently plug leaks in their dams because their survival depends upon the cover provided by the water in their pond. If a beaver can detect the flow of pond water into a pipe, it will plug the pipe with mud and sticks.

To be successful, a beaver dam pipe must eliminate the sound and feel of water flowing into the pipe. Successful pipe designs (e.g. Flexible Pond Leveler, Castor Master, Clemson Pond Leveler) achieve this by protecting the intake end of the pipe with a cylindrical fence enclosure. A beaver swimming along the outside of the fence enclosure is unable to hear or feel the flow of water into the pipe and cannot reach it to block it.

The pond level is controlled by the height of the pipe in the dam. Since beavers depend on water for their survival, the more a beaver pond is lowered with a pipe, the more likely it is that the beavers will try to build a new dam to return the water to its previous high level. In addition, the more a beaver pond is lowered, the more valuable wetland acreage is lost. Therefore, it is important to lower a beaver pond only enough to resolve the threat to human health, safety, or property.

=== Culvert protection ===
A culvert pipe under a road is a common target for beaver damming because the constriction speeds up the current and may resemble a hole in a dam. With a little work, a beaver can quickly plug a culvert with mud and sticks, and turn the entire roadbed into a large dam. Highway Departments often spend significant amounts of time and money repeatedly clearing beaver dams from culverts.

==== Culvert protective fences ====
The Beaver Deceiver (a trapezoidal shaped culvert fence) was invented by Skip Lisle in the 1990s while working for the Penobscot Indian Nation in Maine. It is very effective at completely eliminating beaver damming of a culvert. It works in three ways. First, the perimeter of the trapezoidal fence is typically 40–50 feet (12–15 m) long, making it difficult for a beaver to dam the entire fence. Second, as beavers try to dam the culvert, the fence forces them to dam in a direction away from the culvert, which is not in their nature. Third, as they dam farther out on the fence, the opening of the stream into which it flows gets wider. Therefore, the damming stimuli of the sound and feel of moving water decrease the farther they dam on the fence. If the sides of the fence are at least 12 feet (3.7 m) long, the beavers will generally leave the fence alone.

To be effective, however, a culvert fence must be surrounded by enough water that the beavers will need to dam the entire fence perimeter. In areas where the stream bed is narrow rather than wide, the fence must be narrow so that it is surrounded by water. Being narrow loses one advantage of the trapezoidal shape, but it can still deter beavers from damming the culvert. Since beavers are excellent diggers, a fence floor is usually needed to prevent beaver tunneling under the fence. The fence walls need only be 24 inches (61 cm) above the water line since beavers do not climb.

==== Fence and pipe culvert system ====
Combining a small culvert Fence with a Pond Leveler Pipe is another effective method to protect culverts from beaver damming. The culvert fence is made small enough to encourage the beavers to dam on it, but the resulting pond is prevented from rising to a dangerous level by a Pond Leveler Pipe installed through the culvert fence. The Fence and Pipe flow device needs very little maintenance and limits where and how high the beavers can dam; however, to be most effective, the intake end of the pipe should usually sit in at least 3 feet (91 cm) of water. When this water depth is not possible, a simple Culvert Protective Fence may be the best option.
