= Umbrella species =

Species protected to aid further species

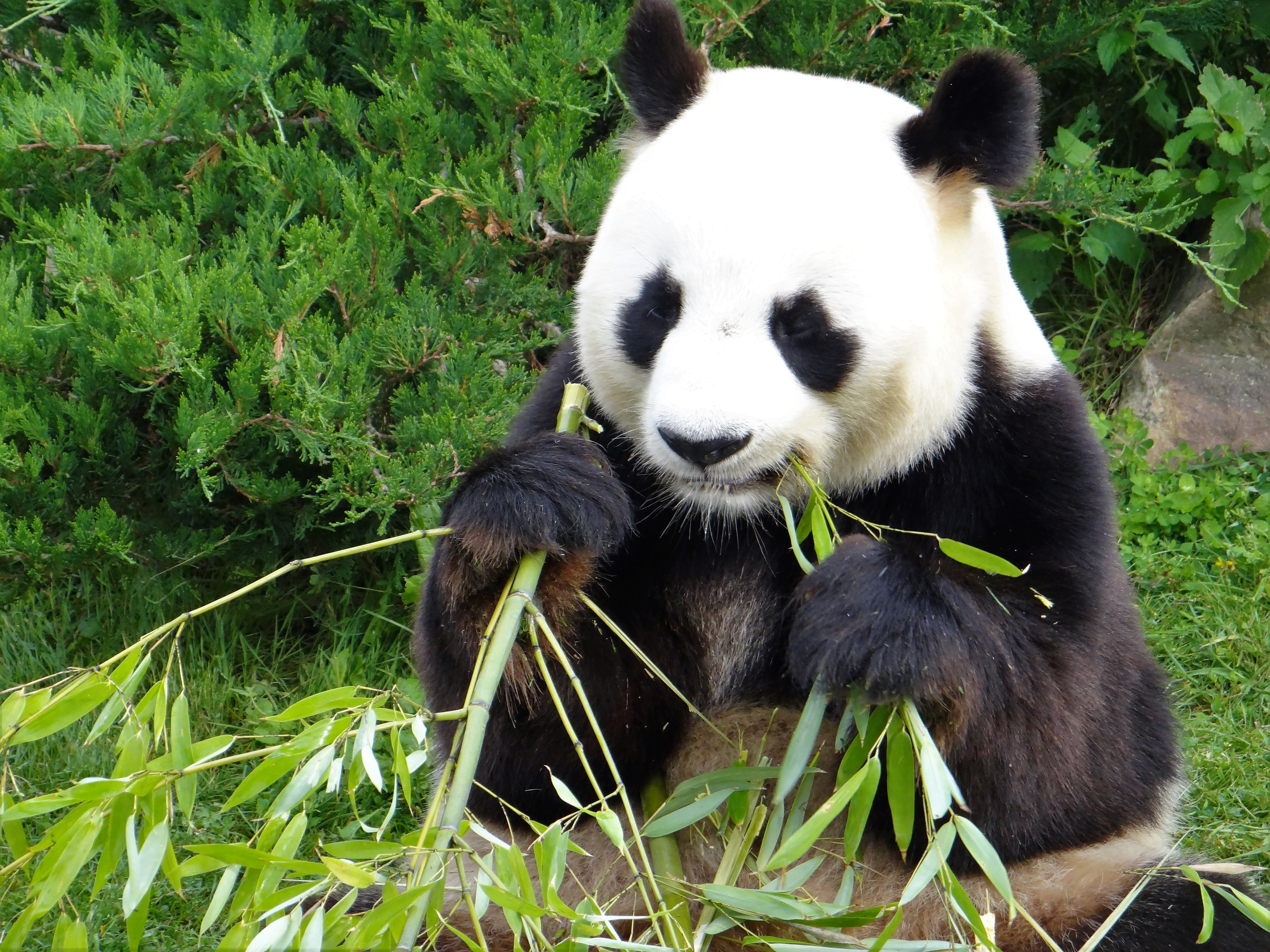
Giant pandas are considered an umbrella species.

Umbrella species are species selected for making conservation-related decisions, typically because protecting these species indirectly protects the many other species that make up the ecological community of its habitat (the umbrella effect). Species conservation can be subjective because it is hard to determine the status of many species. The umbrella species is often either a flagship species whose conservation benefits other species or a keystone species which may be targeted for conservation due to its impact on an ecosystem. Umbrella species can be used to help select the locations of potential reserves, find the minimum size of these conservation areas or reserves, and to determine the composition, structure, and processes of ecosystems.

== Definitions ==
Two commonly used definitions are:

- "A wide-ranging species whose requirements include those of many other species"
- A species with large area requirements for which protection of the species offers protection to other species that share the same habitat

Other descriptions include:

- "Traditional umbrella species, relatively large-bodied and wide-ranging species of higher vertebrates"

Animals may also be considered umbrella species if they are charismatic. The hope is that species that appeal to popular audiences, such as pandas, will attract support for habitat conservation in general.

== In land use management ==
In the two decades after its inception, the use of umbrella species as a conservation tool has been highly debated. The term was first used by Bruce Wilcox in 1984, who defined an umbrella species as one whose minimum area requirements are at least as comprehensive of the rest of the community for which protection is sought through the establishment and management of a protected area.

Some scientists have found that the use of an umbrella species approach can provide a more streamlined way to manage ecological communities. Others have proposed that umbrella species in combination with other tools will more effectively protect other species in land management reserves than using umbrella species alone. Individual invertebrate species can be good umbrella species because they can protect older, unique ecosystems. There have been cases where umbrella species have protected a large amount of area which has been beneficial to surrounding species. Dunk, Zielinski and Welsh (2006) reported that the reserves in Northern California (the Klamath-Siskiyou forests), set aside for the northern spotted owl, also protect mollusks and salamanders within that habitat. They found that the reserves set aside for the northern spotted owl "serve as a reasonable coarse-filter umbrella species for the taxa evaluated", which were mollusks and salamanders.

Gilby and colleagues (2017) found that using threatened species as umbrellas or "surrogates" for management targets could improve conservation outcomes in coastal areas.

== Wildlife corridors ==
The concept of an umbrella species is further utilized to create wildlife corridors with what are termed focal species. These focal species are chosen for a number of reasons and fall into several types, generally measured by their potential for an umbrella effect. By carefully choosing species based on this criterion, a linked or networked habitat can be created from single-species corridors. These criteria are determined with the assistance of geographic information systems on the larger scale. Regardless of the location or scale of conservation, the umbrella effect is a measurement of a species' impact on others and is an important part of determining an approach.

== In the Endangered Species Act (US) ==
The bay checkerspot butterfly has been on the Endangered Species List since 1987. Launer and Murphy (1994) tried to determine whether this butterfly could be considered an umbrella species in protecting the native grassland it inhabits. They discovered that the Endangered Species Act has a loophole excluding federally protected plants on private property. However, the California Environmental Quality Act reinforces state conservation regulations. Using the Endangered Species Act to protect termed umbrella species and their habitats can be controversial because they are not as well enforced in some states as others (such as California) to protect overall biodiversity.

== Examples ==
- Northern spotted owls and old-growth forest: Molluscs and salamanders are within the protective boundaries of the northern spotted owl.
- Bay checkerspot butterfly and grasslands
- Red-cockaded woodpeckers and Southeastern pine grasslands
- Amur tigers in the Russian Far East are considered umbrella/keystone species due to their impact on the deer and boar in their ecosystem
- Right whales
- Sharks
- Giant pandas and mountain ranges in China
- Jaguars and herpetofauna
- Canebrake and other species

Protecting a species like the canebrake has practical applications, as protection measures would have broad environmental value because of an umbrella effect. That is, protecting the rattlesnakes would ensure protection of other wildlife species that use the same habitats but are less sensitive to development or require fewer resources.

— Kimberly Andrews

== See also ==
- Conservation biology
- Dominant species
- Ecological network
- Ecosystem engineer
- Foundation species
- Green corridors
- Flagship species
- Indigenous
- Indicator species
- Introduced species
- Keystone species
- Landscape ecology
