= Keystone species =

Species with a large effect on its environment

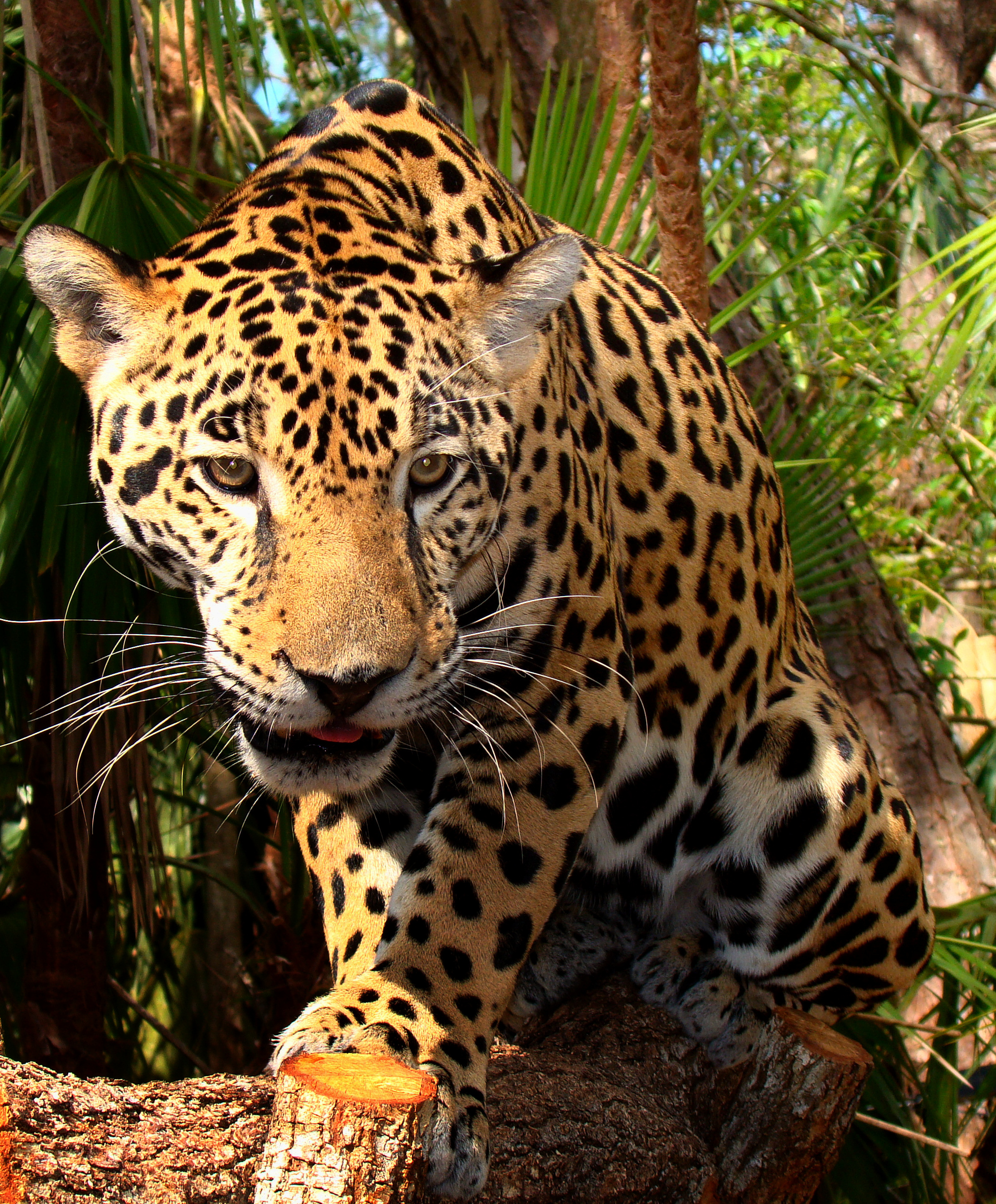
The jaguar: a keystone, flagship, and umbrella species, and an apex predator

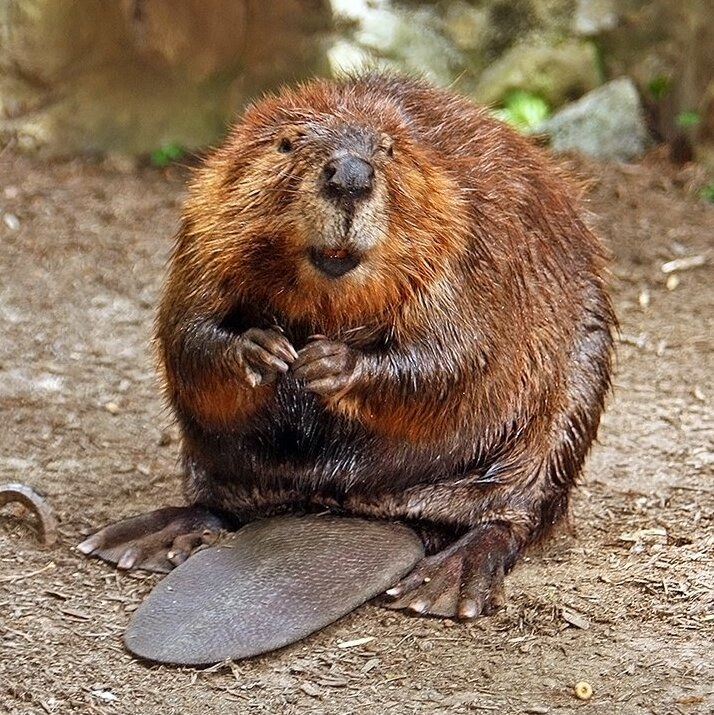
The beaver: a keystone species, and habitat creator, responsible for ecological effects such as the creation of lakes, canals and wetlands irrigating large forests and creating ecosystems

A keystone species is a species that has a disproportionately large effect on its natural environment relative to its abundance. The concept was introduced in 1969 by the zoologist Robert T. Paine. Keystone species play a critical role in maintaining the structure of an ecological community, affecting many other organisms in an ecosystem and helping to determine the types and numbers of various other species in the community. Without keystone species, the ecosystem would be dramatically different or cease to exist altogether. Some keystone species, such as the wolf and lion, are also apex predators.

The role that a keystone species plays in its ecosystem is analogous to the role of a keystone in an arch. While the keystone is under the least pressure of any of the stones in an arch, the arch still collapses without it. Similarly, an ecosystem may experience a dramatic shift if a keystone species is removed, even though that species was a small part of the ecosystem by measures of biomass or productivity. It became a popular concept in conservation biology, alongside flagship and umbrella species. Although the concept is valued as a descriptor for particularly strong inter-species interactions, and has allowed easier communication between ecologists and conservation policy-makers, it has been criticized for oversimplifying complex ecological systems.

== History ==
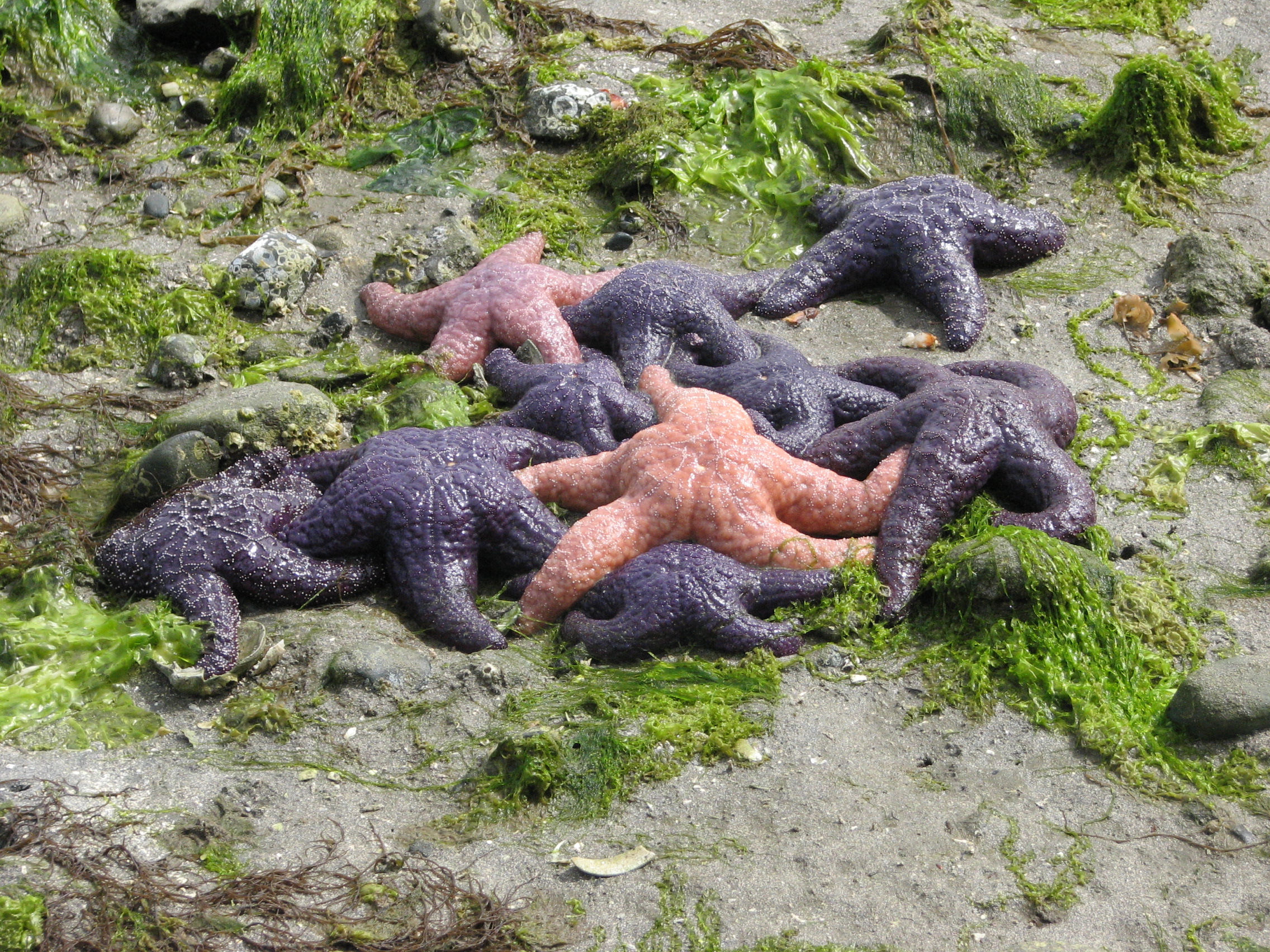
Ochre seastars (Pisaster ochraceus), a keystone predator

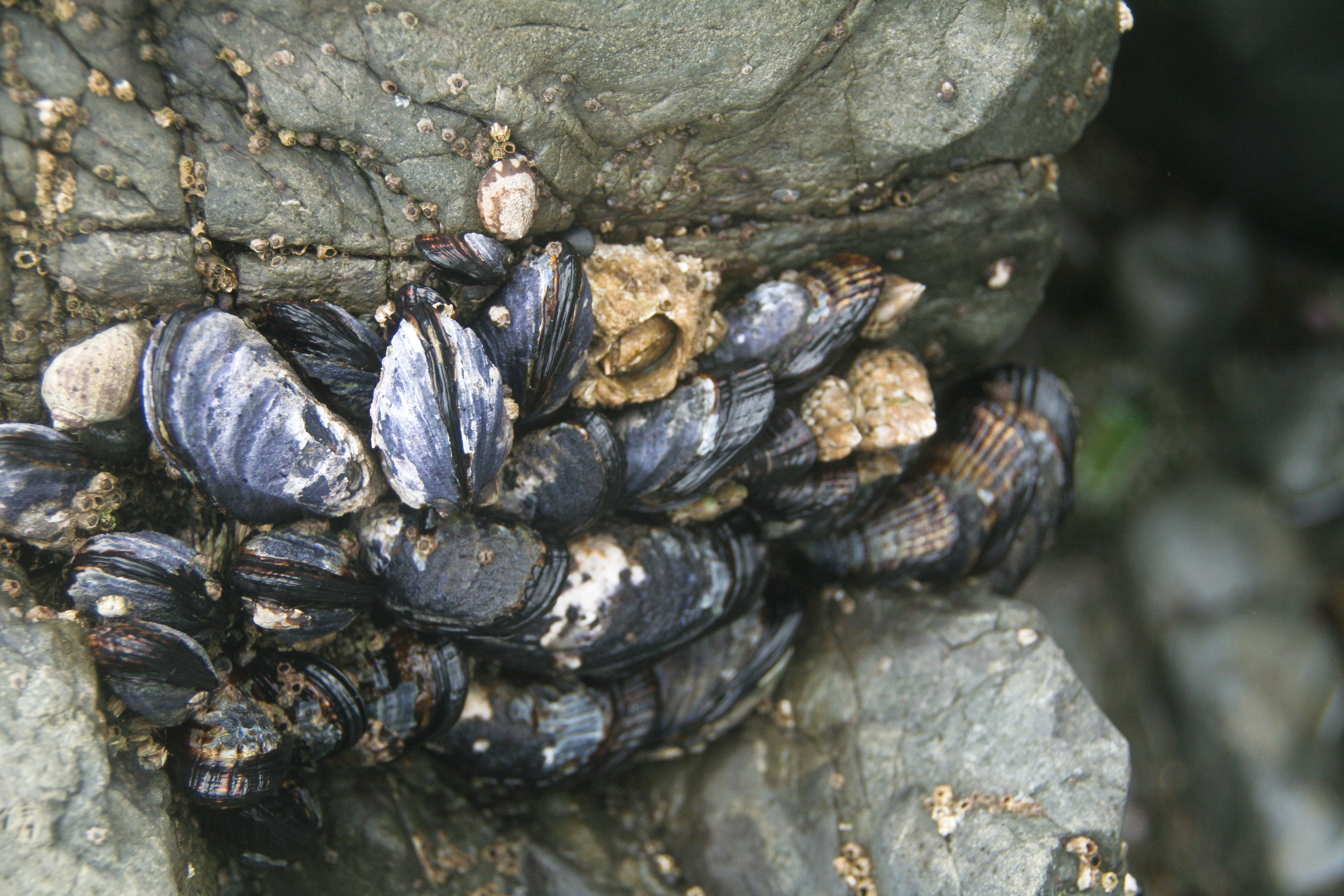
California mussels (Mytilus californianus), the seastar's prey

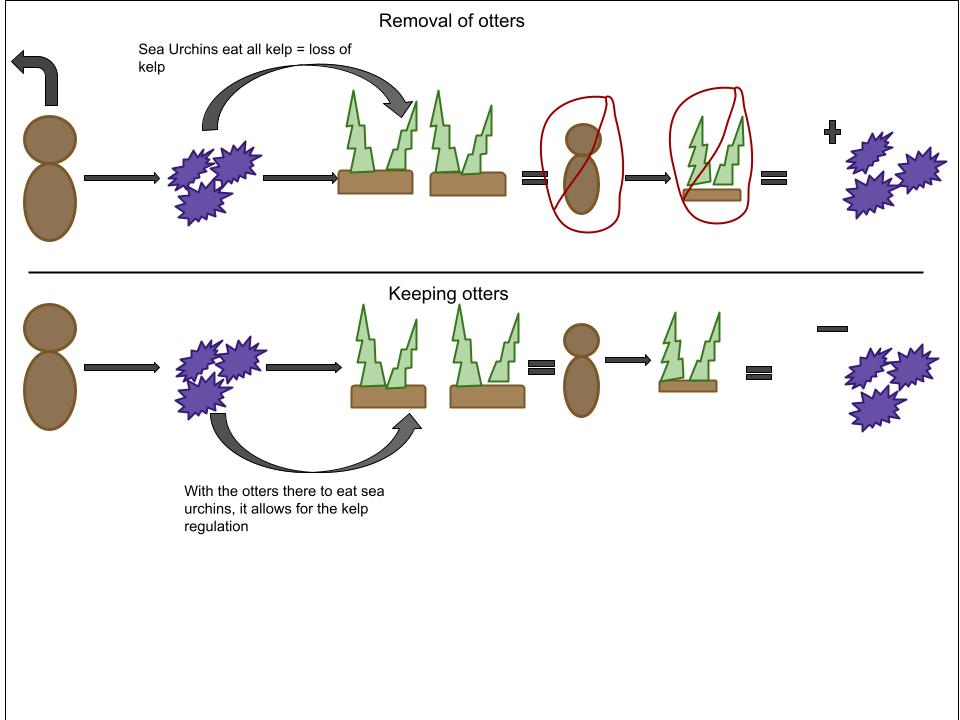
Keystone species will disrupt the environment if removed, And when kept they regulate the environment.

The concept of the keystone species was introduced in 1969 by zoologist Robert T. Paine. Paine developed the concept to explain his observations and experiments on the relationships between marine invertebrates of the intertidal zone (between the high and low tide lines), including starfish and mussels. He removed the starfish from an area, and documented the effects on the ecosystem. In his 1966 paper, Food Web Complexity and Species Diversity, Paine had described such a system in Makah Bay in Washington. In his 1969 paper, Paine proposed the keystone species concept, using Pisaster ochraceus, a species of starfish generally known as ochre starfish, and Mytilus californianus, a species of mussel, as a primary example. The ochre starfish is a generalist predator and feeds on chitons, limpets, snails, barnacles, echinoids, and even decapod crustacea. The favourite food for these starfish is the mussel which is a dominant competitor for the space on the rocks. The ochre starfish keeps the population numbers of the mussels in check along with the other preys allowing the other seaweeds, sponges, and anemones, that ochre starfish do not consume, to co-exist. When Paine removed the ochre starfish, the mussels quickly outgrew the other species crowding them out. At the start, the rock pools held 15 rock-clinging species. Three years later there were 8 such species; and ten years later the pools were largely occupied by a single species, mussels. The concept became popular in conservation, and was deployed in a range of contexts and mobilized to engender support for conservation, especially where human activities had damaged ecosystems, such as by removing keystone predators.

== Definitions ==
A keystone species was defined by Paine as a species that has a disproportionately large effect on its environment relative to its abundance. It has been defined operationally by Davic in 2003 as "a strongly interacting species whose top-down effect on species diversity and competition is large relative to its biomass dominance within a functional group".

A classic keystone species is a predator that prevents a particular herbivorous species from eliminating dominant plant species. If prey numbers are low, keystone predators can be even less abundant and still be effective. Yet without the predators, the herbivorous prey would explode in numbers, wipe out the dominant plants, and dramatically alter the character of the ecosystem. The exact scenario changes in each example, but the central idea remains that through a chain of interactions, a non-abundant species has an outsized impact on ecosystem functions. For example, the herbivorous weevil Euhrychiopsis lecontei is thought to have keystone effects on aquatic plant diversity by foraging on nuisance Eurasian watermilfoil in North American waters. Similarly, the wasp species Agelaia vicina has been labeled a keystone species for its unparalleled nest size, colony size, and high rate of brood production. The diversity of its prey and the quantity necessary to sustain its high rate of growth have a direct impact on other species around it.

The keystone concept is defined by its ecological effects, and these in turn make it important for conservation. In this it overlaps with several other species conservation concepts such as flagship species (attracting support), indicator species (showing the health of the environment), and umbrella species (indirectly protecting many other species). For example, the jaguar is a big cat which meets all of these definitions:

The jaguar is an umbrella species, flagship species, and wilderness quality indicator. It promotes the goals of carnivore recovery, protecting and restoring connectivity through Madrean woodland and riparian areas, and protecting and restoring riparian areas. ... A reserve system that protects jaguars is an umbrella for many other species. ... the jaguar [is] a keystone in subtropical and tropical America ...

— David Maehr et al, 2001

== Predators ==
=== Sea otters and kelp forests ===
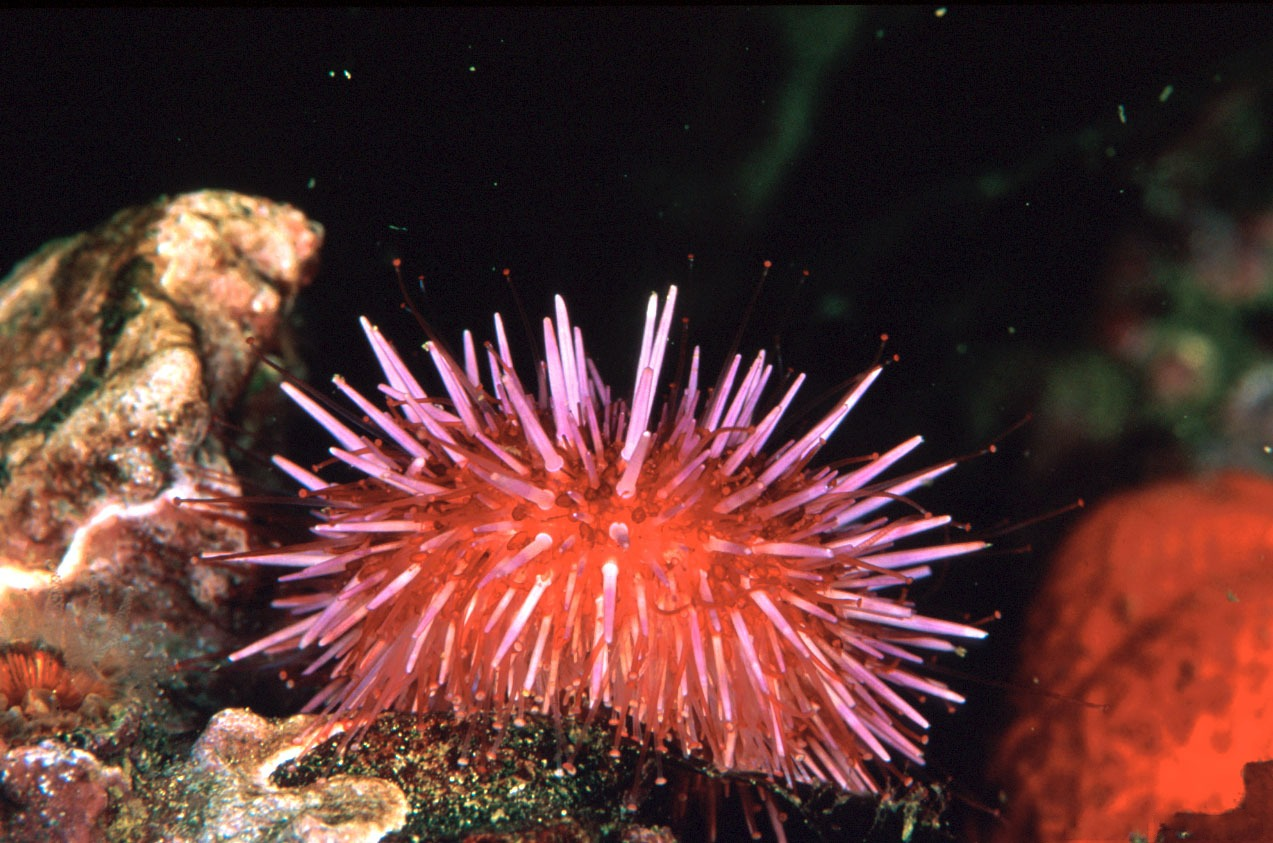
Sea urchins like this purple sea urchin can damage kelp forests by chewing through kelp holdfasts.

The sea otter is an important predator of sea urchins, making it a keystone species for the kelp forests.

Sea otters protect kelp forests from damage by sea urchins. When the sea otters of the North American west coast were hunted commercially for their fur, their numbers fell to such low levels – fewer than 1000 in the north Pacific ocean – that they were unable to control the sea urchin population. The urchins, in turn, grazed the holdfasts of kelp so heavily that the kelp forests largely disappeared, along with all the species that depended on them. Reintroducing the sea otters has enabled the kelp ecosystem to be restored. For example, in Southeast Alaska some 400 sea otters were released, and they have bred to form a population approaching 25,000.

=== The wolf, Yellowstone's apex predator ===
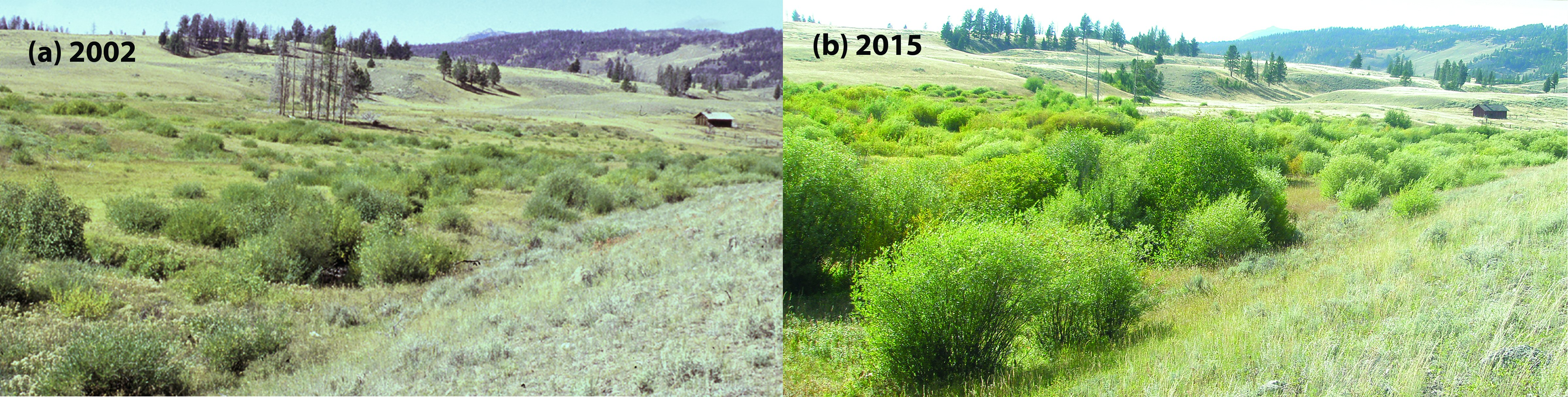
Riparian willow recovery at Blacktail Creek, Yellowstone National Park, showing effect of the reintroduction of wolves

Keystone predators may increase the biodiversity of communities by preventing a single species from becoming dominant. They can have a profound influence on the balance of organisms in a particular ecosystem. Introduction or removal of a keystone predator, or changes in its population density, can have drastic cascading effects on the equilibrium of many other populations in the ecosystem. For example, grazers of a grassland may prevent a single dominant species from taking over.

The elimination of the gray wolf from the Greater Yellowstone Ecosystem had profound impacts on the trophic pyramid. Without predation, herbivores began to over-graze many woody browse species, affecting the area's plant populations. In addition, wolves often kept animals from grazing in riparian areas, which protected beavers from having their food sources encroached upon. The removal of wolves had a direct effect on beaver populations, as their habitat became grazing territory. Increased browsing on willows and conifers along Blacktail Creek due to a lack of predation caused channel incision because the beavers helped slow the water down, allowing soil to stay in place. Furthermore, predation keeps hydrological features such as creeks and streams in normal working order. When wolves were reintroduced, the beaver population and the whole riparian ecosystem recovered dramatically within a few years.

=== Sea stars and other non-apex predators ===
As described by Paine in 1966, some sea stars (e.g., Pisaster ochraceus) may prey on sea urchins, mussels, and other shellfish that have no other natural predators. If the sea star is removed from the ecosystem, the mussel population explodes uncontrollably, driving out most other species.

These creatures need not be apex predators. Sea stars are prey for sharks, rays, and sea anemones. Sea otters are prey for orca.

The jaguar, whose numbers in Central and South America have been classified as near threatened, acts as a keystone predator by its widely varied diet, helping to balance the mammalian jungle ecosystem with its consumption of 87 different species of prey. The lion is another keystone species.

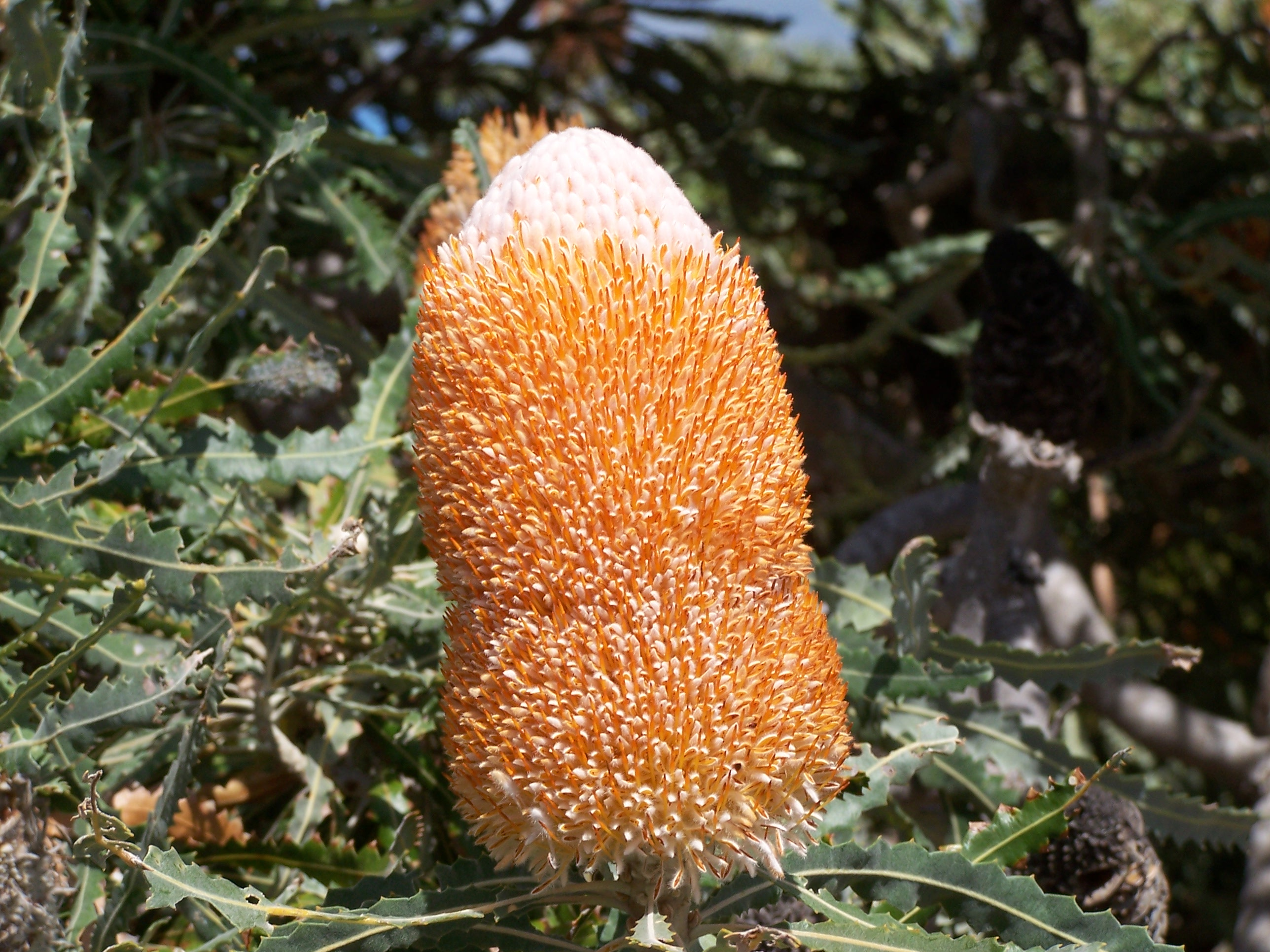
Acorn banksia, Banksia prionotes, is periodically the sole source of nectar for important pollinators, honeyeaters.

== Mutualists ==
Keystone mutualists are organisms that participate in mutually beneficial interaction, the loss of which would have a profound impact upon the ecosystem as a whole. For example, in the Avon Wheatbelt region of Western Australia, there is a period of each year when Banksia prionotes (acorn banksia) is the sole source of nectar for honeyeaters, which play an important role in pollination of numerous plant species. Therefore, the loss of this one species of tree would probably cause the honeyeater population to collapse, with profound implications for the entire ecosystem. Another example is frugivores, such as the cassowary, which spreads the seeds of many different trees. Some seeds will not grow unless they have been through a cassowary.

== Ecosystem engineers ==
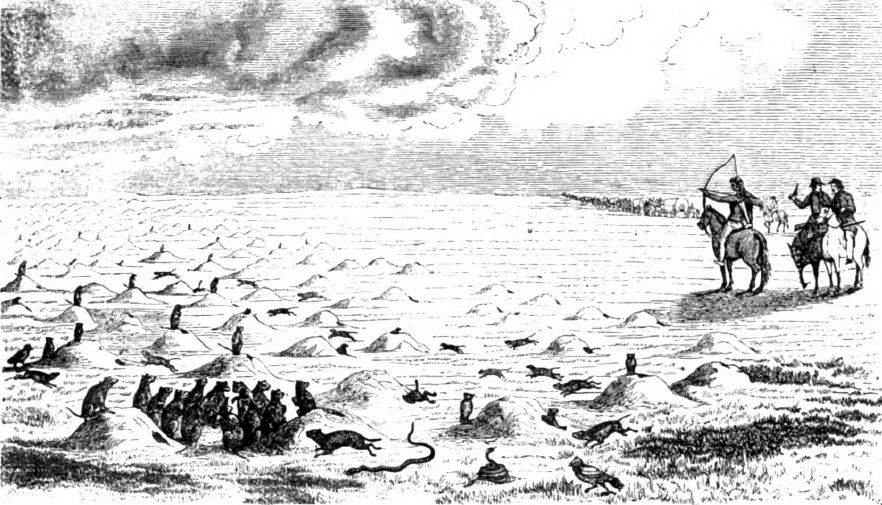
Prairie dog town. Drawing by Josiah Gregg, 1844

A term used alongside keystone is ecosystem engineer. In North America, the prairie dog is an ecosystem engineer. Prairie dog burrows provide the nesting areas for mountain plovers and burrowing owls. Prairie dog tunnel systems also help channel rainwater into the water table to prevent runoff and erosion, and can also serve to change the composition of the soil in a region by increasing aeration and reversing soil compaction that can be a result of cattle grazing. Prairie dogs also trim the vegetation around their colonies, perhaps to remove any cover for predators. Grazing species such as plains bison, which is another keystone species, the pronghorn, and the mule deer have shown a proclivity for grazing on the same land used by prairie dogs.

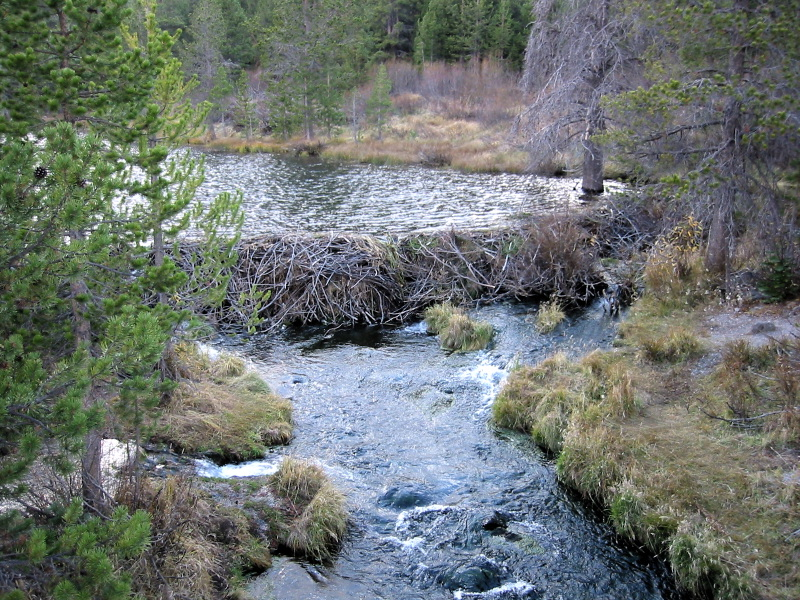
Beaver dam, an animal construction which has a transformative effect on the environment

The beaver is a well known ecosystem engineer and keystone species. It transforms its territory from a stream to a pond or swamp. Beavers affect the environment first altering the edges of riparian areas by cutting down older trees to use for their dams. This allows younger trees to take their place. Beaver dams alter the riparian area they are established in. Depending on topography, soils, and many factors, these dams change the riparian edges of streams and rivers into wetlands, meadows, or riverine forests. These dams have been shown to be beneficial to a myriad of species including amphibians, salmon, and song birds.

In the African savanna, the larger herbivores, especially the elephants, shape their environment. The elephants destroy trees, making room for the grass species and creating habitat for various small animal species. Without these animals, much of the savanna would turn into woodland. In the Amazon river basin, peccaries produce and maintain wallows that are utilized by a wide variety of species. Australian studies have found that parrotfish on the Great Barrier Reef are the only reef fish that consistently scrape and clean the coral on the reef. Without these animals, the Great Barrier Reef would be under severe strain.

In the Serengeti, the presence of sufficient gnus in these grasslands reduces wildfire likelihood, which in turn promotes tree growth. The documentary The Serengeti Rules documents this in detail.

== Limitations ==
=== Depends on context ===
The community ecologist Bruce Menge states that the keystone concept has been stretched far beyond Paine's original concept. That stretching can be quantified: the researcher Ishana Shukla has listed 230 species identified as keystones in some 157 studies in the 50 years since Paine's paper. Menge's own work has shown that the purple Pisaster sea star that Paine had studied was a powerful keystone species in places exposed to strong wave action, but was far less important in sheltered places. Paine had indeed stated that in Alaska, without the relevant mussel species as prey, the predatory Pisaster was "just another sea star". In other words, the extent to which a species could be described as a keystone depended on the ecological context.

=== Multiple meanings ===
Although the concept of the keystone species has a value in describing particularly strong inter-species interactions, and for allowing easier communication between ecologists and conservation policy-makers, it has been criticized by L. S. Mills and colleagues for oversimplifying complex ecological systems. The term has been applied widely in different ecosystems and to predators, prey, and plants (primary producers), inevitably with differing ecological meanings. For instance, removing a predator may allow other animals to increase to the point where they wipe out other species; removing a prey species may cause predator populations to crash, or may allow predators to drive other prey species to extinction; and removing a plant species may result in the loss of animals that depend on it, like pollinators and seed dispersers. Beavers too have been called keystone, not for eating other species but for modifying the environment in ways that affected other species. The term has thus been given quite different meanings in different cases. In Mills's view, Paine's work showed that a few species could sometimes have extremely strong interactions within a particular ecosystem, but that does not automatically imply that other ecosystems have a similar structure.

== See also ==
- Cultural keystone species
- Ecosystem service
- Foundation species
- Indigenous
- Introduced species
- Rewilding
- Sentinel species
