= Ditton =

Ditton may refer to:

== Places ==
=== Canada ===
- The former Ditton, Quebec, which amalgamated into La Patrie, Quebec in 1997
- Ditton River, a tributary of the rivière au Saumon in Le Haut-Saint-François Regional County Municipality, Estrie, Québec
- Ditton East River, a tributary of the Ditton River in Chartierville, Quebec
- Ditton West River, a tributary of the Ditton River in hartierville, Quebec

=== United Kingdom ===
- Ditton, Cheshire, an area of Widnes
- Ditton, Kent
- Ditton, Slough, Berkshire
- Ditton Green, Suffolk
- Ditton Priors, Shropshire
- Long Ditton, Surrey
- Thames Ditton, Surrey

== People with the surname ==
- Humphry Ditton (1675–1715), English mathematician
- Lia Ditton (born 1980), British sailor
