= Ditton West River =

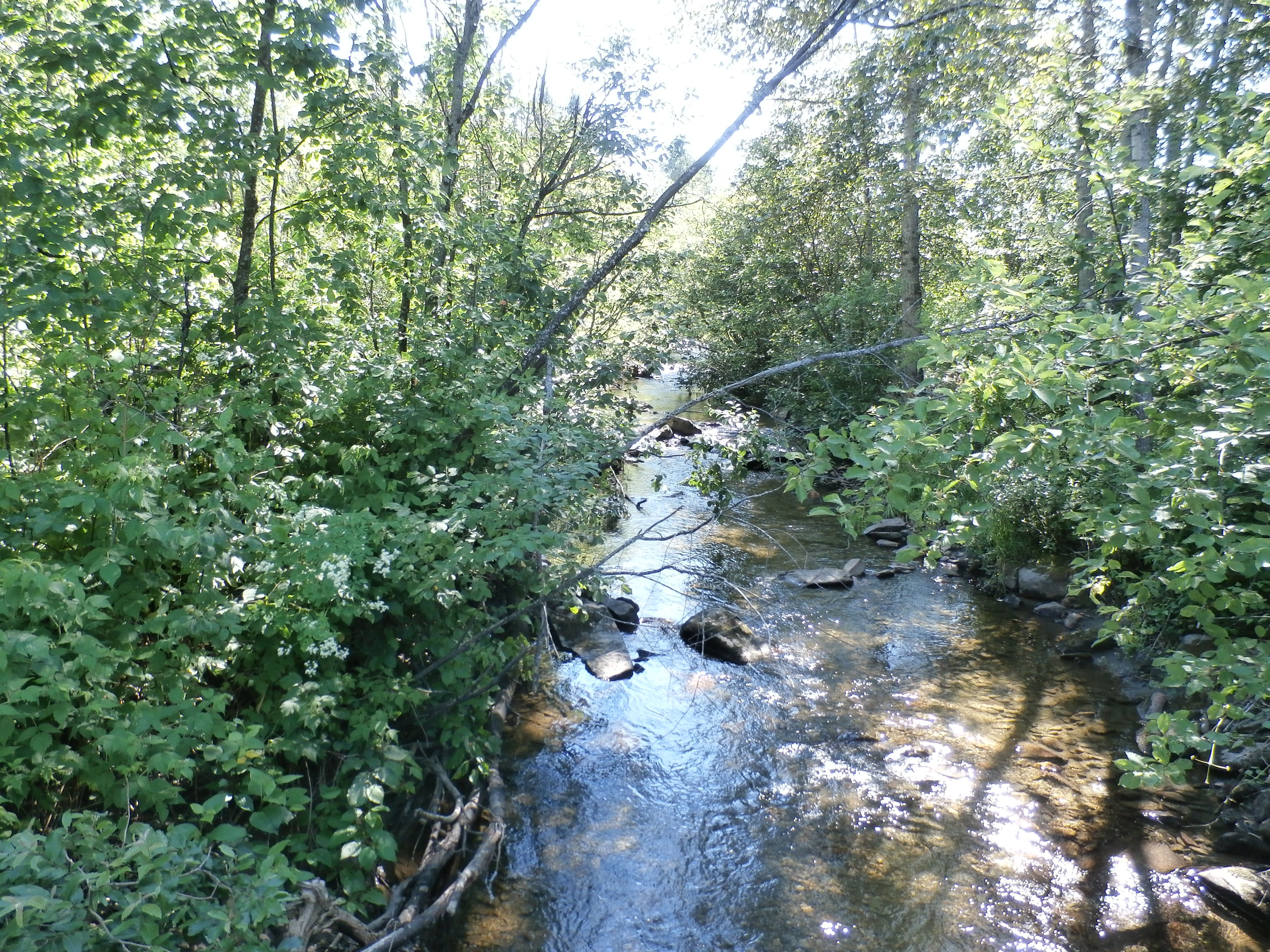

Location
- Country: Canada
- Province: Quebec
- Administrative region: Estrie
- Regional County Municipality: Le Haut-Saint-François Regional County Municipality

Physical characteristics
- Source: Little mountain lake
  - location: Chartierville
  - coordinates: 45°16′22″N 71°12′48″W
  - elevation: 561 m (1,841 ft)
- Mouth: Ditton River
  - location: Chartierville
  - coordinates: 45°16′22″N 71°10′39″W
  - elevation: 470 m (1,540 ft)
- Length: 7.0 km (4.3 mi)

Basin features
- Progression: Ditton River, Rivière au Saumon, Saint-François River, Saint Lawrence River
- Tributaries
  - left: (upstream)
  - right: (upstream)

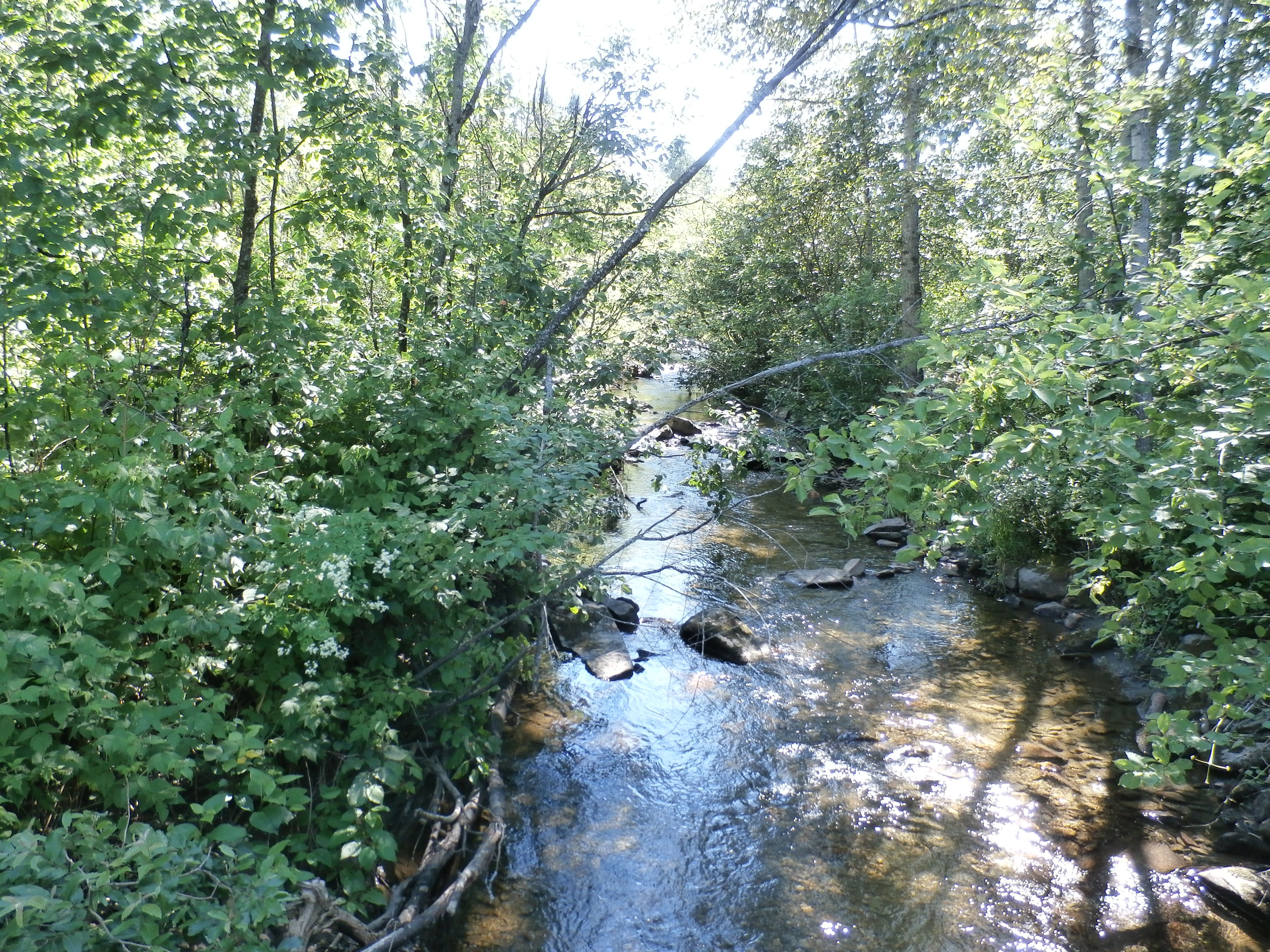
West Ditton River near Chartierville.

The Rivière Ditton Ouest is a tributary of the Ditton River (hydrographic side of the rivière au Saumon). The Ditton West River flows in the municipality of Chartierville, in the Le Haut-Saint-François Regional County Municipality, in the administrative region of Estrie, in the province of Quebec, in Canada.

Forestry is the main economic activity in this valley; agriculture, second, especially in the lower part.

The surface of the East Ditton River is usually frozen from mid-December to mid-March, except the rapids areas; however, safe circulation on the ice is generally from late December to early March.

== Geography ==
The hydrographic slopes neighboring the "Ditton West" river are:

- north side: Ditton River;
- east side: Ditton River;
- south side: West Branch Magalloway (United States);
- west side: North Eaton River, Black Creek, rivière du Sud (North Eaton River).

The Ditton West River rises south of Quebec in the township of Emberton, southwest of the village of Chartierville, west of "Route Saint-Hyacinthe" and south from rue Verchères in Chartierville. This source is also located north of Mont Prospect (on the border between Quebec and New Hampshire) and north of the "Connecticut Lakes Natural Area" (Coos County, New Hampshire, USA).

From its source, the West Ditton River flows north on 7.0 km (4.3 mi), with a drop of 91 m (299 ft), crossing Chemin Saint-Paul (connecting the village of Chartierville to the hamlet of "Bellefeuille"); then north-east, crossing route 257.

The West Ditton River flows onto the West Bank of the Ditton River. Its confluence is located east of Route Saint-Jean-Baptiste which is identified as the route 257.

== Toponymy ==
The term "Ditton" is a family name of British origin.

The toponym "Ditton" was taken from the name of an important village and civil parish in the Tonbridge and Malling district of Kent, in England. This toponym is also used in Quebec to designate the Ditton East River and the Ditton River.

The toponym "Rivière Ditton Ouest" was formalized on December 5, 1968, at the Commission de toponymie du Québec.

== See also ==
- Saint-François River, a stream
- List of rivers of Quebec
