= Ditton East River =

Location
- Country: Canada
- Province: Quebec
- Region: Estrie
- City: Chartierville

Physical characteristics
- Source: Mountain streams
  - location: Chartierville
  - coordinates: 45°15′04″N 71°10′31″W
  - elevation: 590 m (1,940 ft)
- Mouth: Ditton River
  - location: Chartierville
  - coordinates: 45°17′56″N 71°10′09″W
  - elevation: 470 m (1,540 ft)
- Length: 5.9 km (3.7 mi)

Basin features
- Progression: Ditton River, Rivière au Saumon, Saint-François River, Saint Lawrence River
- Tributaries
  - left: (upstream)
  - right: (upstream)

The Rivière Ditton Est (English: Ditton East River) is a tributary of the Ditton River (hydrographic slope of the rivière au Saumon). The Ditton East River flows in the municipality of Chartierville, in the Le Haut-Saint-François Regional County Municipality, in the administrative region of Estrie, in the province of Quebec, in Canada.

Forestry is the main economic activity in this valley; agriculture, second, especially in the lower part.

The surface of the East Ditton River is usually frozen from mid-December to mid-March, except the rapids areas; however, safe circulation on the ice is generally from late December to early March.

== Geography ==
The hydrographic slopes neighboring the "Ditton East" river are:

- north side: Ditton River;
- East Coast:
- south side: West Branch Magalloway (United States);
- west side: Ditton River.

The Ditton East River originates from the confluence of two mountain streams, very close to the border with Quebec.

The course of the East Ditton River flows over 5.9 km (3.7 mi) in the forest zone in the township of Emberton, first north down the mountain, crossing Chemin Saint-Paul, then meandering before turning west at the end of the segment, up to its mouth.

The East Ditton River flows onto an elbow of the river on the South bank of the Ditton River, 1.4 km (0.87 mi) upstream of the confluence of the Ditton West River. The confluence of the Ditton East river is located northeast of the village of Chartierville, north of Chemin Saint-Paul, east of Route Saint-Jean-Baptiste which is identified as the route 257.

== Toponymy ==
The term "Ditton" is a family name of British origin.

The toponym "Ditton" was taken from the name of an important village and civil parish in the Tonbridge and Malling district of Kent, in England. This toponym is also used in Quebec to designate the Ditton River and the Ditton West River.

The toponym "Rivière Ditton Est" was formalized on December 5, 1968, at the Commission de toponymie du Québec.

== See also ==
- Saint-François River, a stream
- List of rivers of Quebec
