= Chesham River =

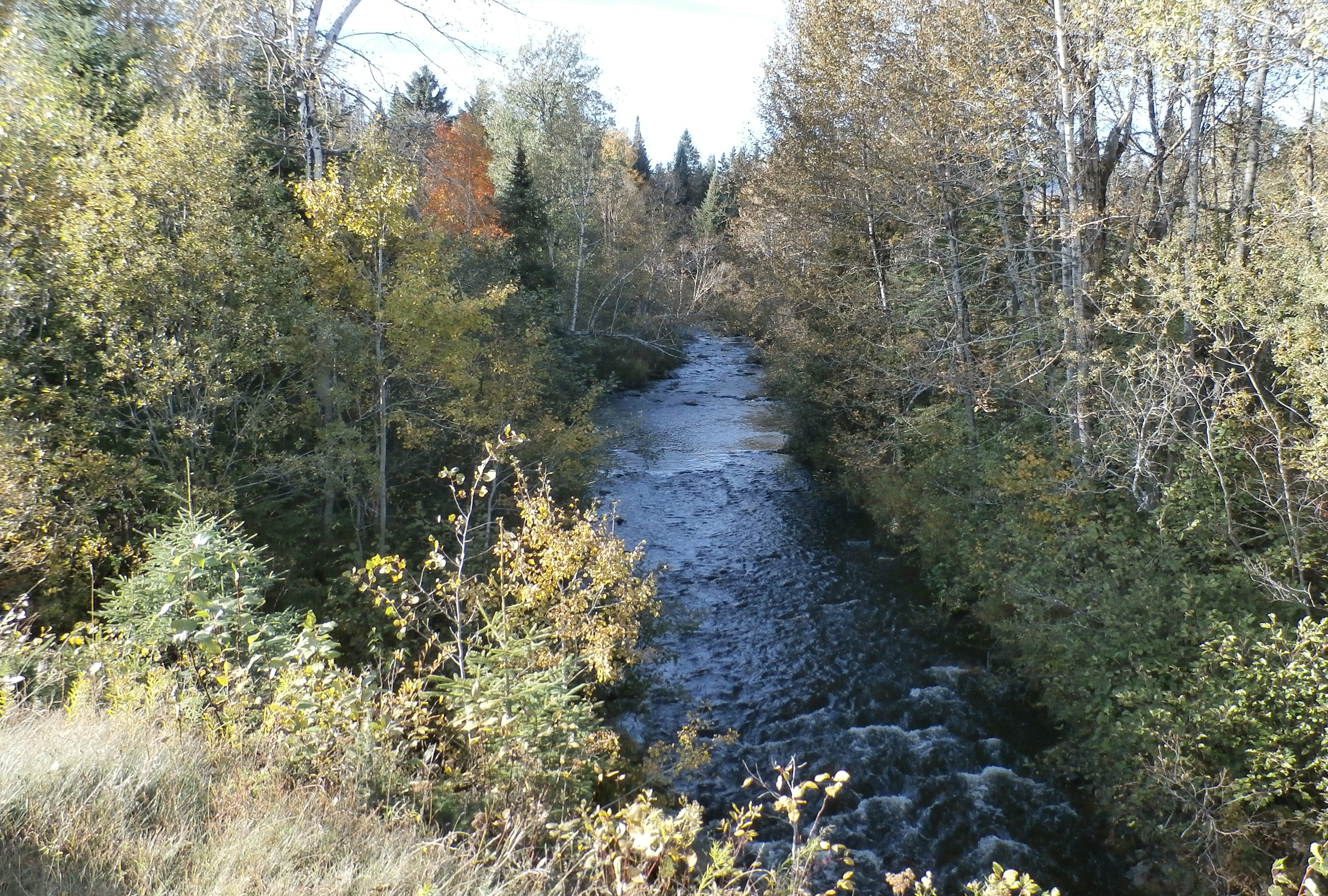
- Chesham River, Route 212 between the village of La Patrie and Notre-Dame-des-Bois.

Location
- Country: Canada
- Province: Quebec
- Region: Estrie
- Regional County Municipality: Le Granit Regional County Municipality and Le Haut-Saint-François Regional County Municipality

Physical characteristics
- Source: Little mountain lake
  - location: Notre-Dame-des-Bois
  - coordinates: 45°27′16″N 71°03′31″W
  - elevation: 570 m (1,870 ft)
- Mouth: Massawippi River
  - location: Sherbrooke
  - coordinates: 45°22′36″N 71°10′38″W
  - elevation: 379 m (1,243 ft)
- Length: 20.4 km (12.7 mi)

Basin features
- Progression: Rivière au Saumon, Saint-François River, Saint Lawrence River
- Tributaries
  - left: (upstream) Pont Bleu stream (main tributary: Pont Rouge stream).
  - right: (upstream) Deloge stream, De la Fromagerie stream.

The Chesham River is a tributary of the rivière au Saumon, in the administrative region of Estrie, in the province of Quebec, in Canada. This river flows successively in the municipalities of:

- MRC Le Granit Regional County Municipality: in the township of Chesham in municipality of Notre-Dame-des-Bois;
- MRC Le Haut-Saint-François Regional County Municipality: in the township of Ditton La Patrie.

Forestry is the main economic activity in this. valley

The surface of the Chesham River is usually frozen from mid-December to mid-March, except the rapids areas; however, safe circulation on the ice is generally from late December to early March.

== Geography ==
The hydrographic slopes near the "Chesham River" are:

- north side: Saint-François River, Rouge River (rivière au Saumon);
- east side: Victoria River, Clinton River, Bergeron River;
- south side: rivière au Saumon, West Branch Magalloway (United States);
- west side: rivière au Saumon.

The Chesham River originates at the confluence of two mountain streams located on the southern flank of a mountain which is located between Mégantic Mountain (located on the west side) and Sommet Valence (located on the east side).

From its source, the Chesham River flows on 20.4 km (12.7 mi) on the south side of Mont-Mégantic National Park, divided into the following segments:

- 2.6 km (1.6 mi) westwards, up to its confluence with a stream (coming from the northeast);
- 2.6 km (1.6 mi) southwards, up to the confluence with the Fromagerie stream (coming from the north-west);
- 3.7 km (2.3 mi) south-west, up to the confluence (located at 1.1 km (0.68 mi) north-west of the road intersection in the heart of the village of Notre-Dame-des-Bois) with the Pont Rouge stream;
- 3.7 km (2.3 mi) to the southwest, crossing route 212, to the confluence of Deloge stream;
- 7.8 km (4.8 mi) south-west, to its mouth.

The Chesman River flows on the northeast bank of the rivière au Saumon. Its mouth is located 3.2 km (2.0 mi) upstream of the mouth of the Ditton River, 5.1 km (3.2 mi) south of the summit of Black Mountain and 5.4 km (3.4 mi) south of the summit of Mont Notre-Dame.

== Toponymy ==
The term "Chesham" refers to a town in the Chilterns, in Buckinghamshire, in England.

The toponym "Chesham River" was formalized on December 5, 1968, at the Commission de toponymie du Québec.
