= Ditton River =

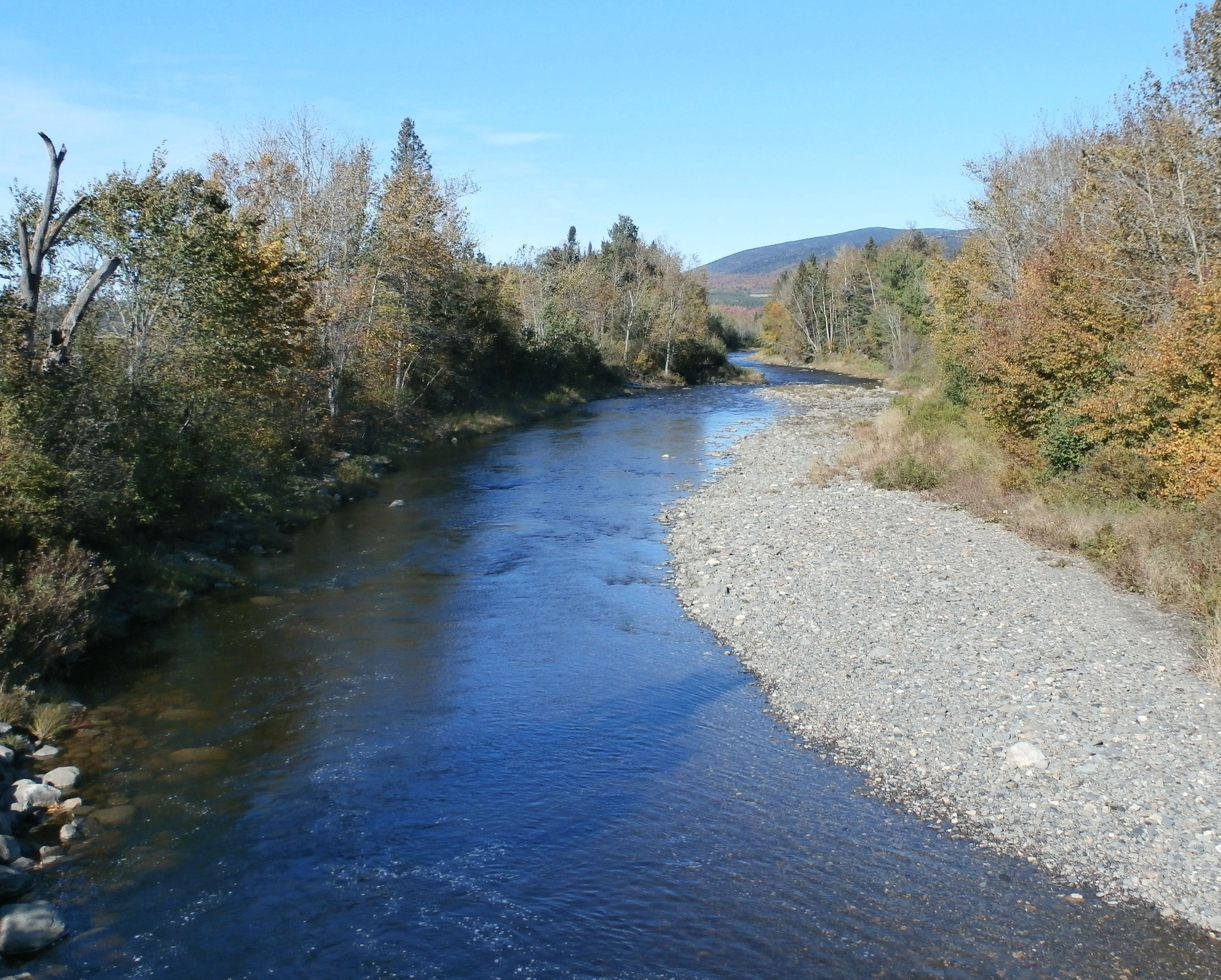
- Ditton River viewed from the bridge on Petit-Canada Road near La Patrie. Mont Mégantic in the background.

Location
- Country: Canada
- Province: Quebec
- Region: Estrie
- City: La Patrie and Chartierville

Physical characteristics
- Source: Mountain streams
  - location: La Patrie
  - coordinates: 45°14′36″N 71°11′09″W
  - elevation: 644 m (2,113 ft)
- Mouth: Rivière au Saumon (Le Haut-Saint-François)
  - location: La Patrie
  - coordinates: 45°23′27″N 71°12′31″W
  - elevation: 374 m (1,227 ft)
- Length: 22.1 km (13.7 mi)

Basin features
- Progression: Rivière au Saumon, Saint-François River, Saint Lawrence River
- Tributaries
  - left: (upstream) Mining stream, Ditton West River
  - right: (upstream) Ditton East River

The Rivière Ditton is a tributary of the rivière au Saumon. This river flows in the municipalities of Chartierville and La Patrie, in the Le Haut-Saint-François Regional County Municipality, in the administrative region of Estrie, in the province of Quebec, in Canada.

Forestry is the main economic activity in this valley; agriculture, second, especially in the lower part.

The surface of the Ditton River is usually frozen from mid-December to mid-March, except the rapids areas; however, safe circulation on the ice is generally from late December to early March.

== Geography ==
The hydrographic slopes neighboring the "Ditton River" are:

- north side: rivière au Saumon;
- east side: rivière au Saumon, Chesham River;
- south side: West Branch Magalloway (United States);
- west side: North Eaton River, Labbé stream.

The Ditton River originates in the south of Quebec in the township of Emberton, in the White Mountains 0.6 km (0.37 mi) from the border between Quebec and New Hampshire, 1.8 km (1.1 mi) east of the Line Mountain (791 m (2,595 ft)) and 1.9 km (1.2 mi) east of "Third Connecticut Lake" located in the "Connecticut Lakes State Forest" in New Hampshire.

The course of the Ditton River descends on 22.1 km (13.7 mi), according to the following segments:

- 5.7 km (3.5 mi) northwards, to the confluence of a stream (coming from the East);
- 2.0 km (1.2 mi) northwards, to the confluence of the Ditton East River (coming from the East);
- 1.4 km (0.87 mi) northwards, to the confluence of the Ditton West River (coming from the south west);
- 0.7 km (0.43 mi) north, to the limit of the townships of Ditton and Emberton;
- 3.0 km (1.9 mi) north, to a stream (coming from the East);
- 2.7 km (1.7 mi) north to Mining Creek (coming from the West);
- 6.6 km (4.1 mi) north, to its mouth.

The Ditton river flows on the south bank of the rivière au Saumon. Its confluence is located south of the route 212, southwest of the intersection of this latter route with the route 257 of the village La Patrie.

== Toponymy ==
The term "Ditton" is a family name of British origin.

The toponym "Ditton" was taken from the name of an important village and civil parish in the Tonbridge and Malling district of Kent, in England. This toponym is also used in Quebec to designate the Ditton East River and the Ditton West River.

The toponym "rivière Ditton" was formalized on December 5, 1968, at the Commission de toponymie du Québec.

== See also ==
- Saint-François River, a stream
- List of rivers of Quebec
