= Pittsburg–Chartierville Border Crossing =

Canada–United States border crossing

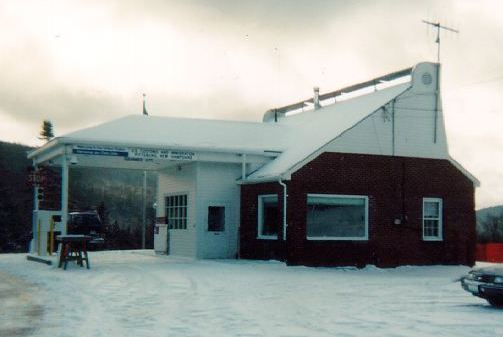
- Pittsburg, New Hampshire, border station in 1997

Location
- Country: United States; Canada
- Location: US 3 / R-257; U.S. port: 6293 North Main Street, Pittsburg, New Hampshire 03592; Canadian port: 165 St-Hyacinthe Street, Chartierville, Quebec J0B 1K0
- Coordinates: 45.252715°N 71.204957°W

Details
- Opened: July 30, 1939; 87 years ago

Website
- Official Canadian website; Official US website

The Pittsburg–Chartierville Border Crossing connects the towns of Chartierville, Quebec, and Pittsburg, New Hampshire. The crossing can be reached by U.S. Route 3 on the American side and by Quebec Route 257 on the Canadian side.

Neither the American or Canadian port of entry at this location is open 24 hours a day; the nearest such facility is the Beecher Falls–East Hereford Border Crossing, approximately a 31-mile (50 km) drive on the American side and a 42-mile (68 km) drive the Canadian side.

== Description ==
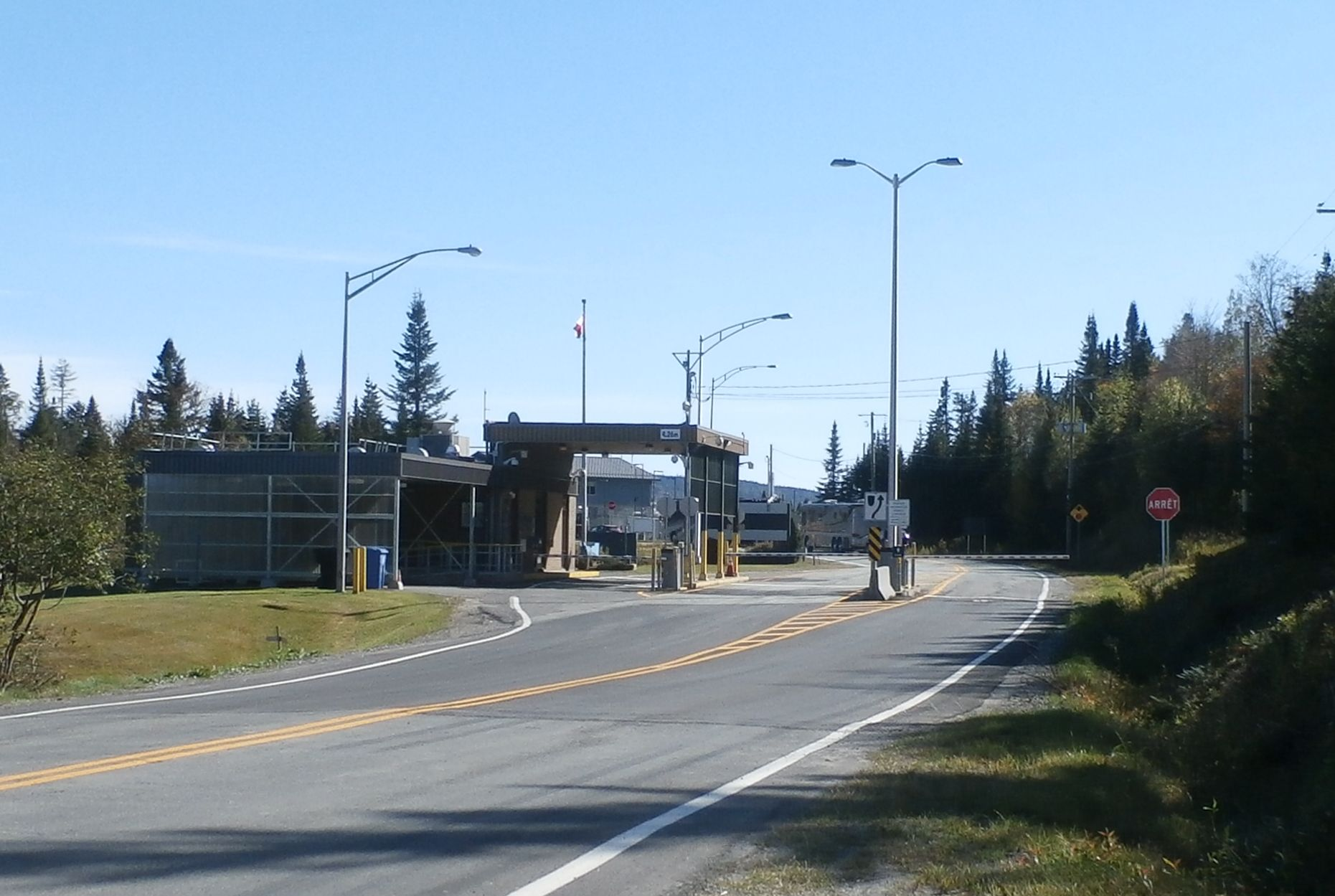
Canadian customs at the Pittsburg–Chartierville crossing

The Pittsburg–Chartierville Border Crossing is the only crossing on the Canada–United States border in the state of New Hampshire, which is the only U.S. state with a single international border crossing. It serves about 10,000 vehicles a year. Pittsburg is notable for being the largest township (in terms of land area) in the continental United States.

The border station between New Hampshire and Quebec first opened on July 30, 1939. This was preceded by the construction of approximately 10 miles (16 km) of new unpaved road by the Civilian Conservation Corps (CCC) from the Second Connecticut Lake to the border. The original facilities consisted of "little more than a shanty" on the American side and a log cabin on the Canadian side. The new road was formally dedicated on September 24, 1939, as an extension of the Daniel Webster Highway. A sign noting that date, along with the name of the road's key proponent, local politician George D. Roberts, can be seen along the road approximately 200 yards (180 m) south of the border.

The small one-room structure on the American side was later replaced by a mobile home. The U.S. did not have a permanent inspection facility at the border until 1960, and the northernmost stretch of U.S. Route 3 remained unpaved until about 1970. In 2012, the U.S. built a new border inspection facility. Constructed at a cost of $7.4 million, Customs and Border Protection (CBP) planned to name it the "Beecher Falls Port of Entry via Pittsburg, New Hampshire", referencing the Beecher Falls–East Hereford Border Crossing in Vermont, until New Hampshire politicians appealed to CBP, who then named it the "Pittsburg Border Station".

The Fourth Connecticut Lake Trail starts near the parking lot of the U.S. border station.

== Incidents and events ==
=== 1973 human smuggling incident ===
On October 23, 1973, a man from Montreal entered the United States at the border crossing with five men from Haiti illegally aboard his truck. The Canadian man pleaded guilty to illegally bringing aliens into the country and was sentenced to 90 days in federal custody, while the five men from Haiti received suspended sentences and were turned over to the Immigration and Naturalization Service (INS).

=== 1991 weapons arrests ===
On December 27, 1991, two American teenagers were arrested on the Canadian side of the border by Sûreté du Québec after a search of their vehicle uncovered brass knuckles and Mace gas, both of which were illegal in Canada. The youths were also reportedly carrying Ku Klux Klan membership cards.

=== 1999 remote inspection incident ===
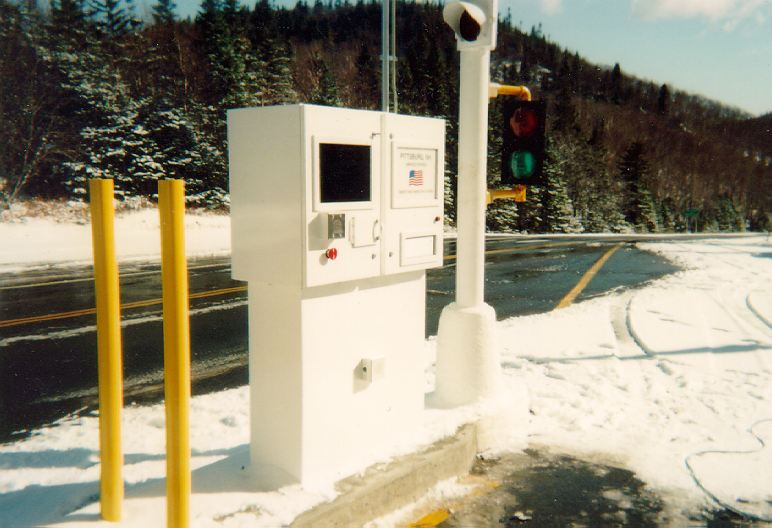
RVIS at the Pittsburg border station in 1997.

In the late 1990s, some low-traffic border crossings between the U.S. and Canada were equipped with a Remote Video Inspection System (RVIS), which could be used to admit low-risk travelers to the U.S. during times that a station did not have staff on-site. As the Pittsburg border station was only staffed during limited hours, it received an RVIS, which entered operation on January 4, 1999. Using RVIS, the station was being operated remotely from 4 p.m. to 8 a.m. in December 1999.

At 2:35 a.m. on December 15, 1999, an Italian-born Canadian woman named Lucia Garofalo tried to use the RVIS to enter the U.S., traveling with a man lacking identification who claimed to be a Pakistani-born Canadian citizen, and a trunk full of packages that were later suspected to be explosives. The remote inspector denied them entry and instructed them to report to a staffed border crossing; they instead retreated into Canada. Garofalo had, on December 6, successfully entered the U.S. at the same crossing with two passengers, then re-entered Canada on December 12 via the Derby Line–Stanstead Border Crossing with her son and a man claiming to be an Algerian national who lacked identification; Canadian authorities allowed them to enter Canada and reported the incident to U.S. officials.

On December 19, Garofalo tried to enter the U.S. at the Beecher Falls–East Hereford Border Crossing with a man who claimed to be Algerian—when an initial inspection detected her recent failed entry, a search was conducted, which found that the man had a forged French passport; both were arrested. Garofalo was later found to have ties to Ahmed Ressam, an Algerian member of al-Qaeda who was arrested by Customs Service officials in Port Angeles, Washington, on December 14, 1999, when he tried to enter the U.S. with explosives hidden in the trunk of his car. It was later established that Ressam planned to bomb Los Angeles International Airport (LAX) on New Year's Eve 1999 as part of the 2000 millennium attack plots.

At Beecher Falls, Garofalo's vehicle contained no explosives, but trace elements were detected, suggesting that it previously had contained explosive material. What role, if any, Garofalo may have had with the millennium attack plots remains unclear. Garofalo was prosecuted on alien smuggling charges, largely on the strength of the audio recording of her declarations via the RVIS. Statements she made that evening, which included that her traveling companion was her brother, were proven to be untrue. At that time, the Pittsburg border station was the only one of the 163 U.S. land border stations where both audio and video of primary inspections were recorded. Garofalo pleaded guilty in February 2000 and was allowed to return to Canada; she received a sentence of two years' probation in May 2000. Ultimately, it was determined that the man arrested with Garofalo was actually Moroccan—he remained in jail until May 2000, when he was sentenced to two years' supervised release and was returned to Canada. While there was no failure of the RVIS, this incident prompted the Immigration and Naturalization Service to cease using it. The program as a whole was suspended following the September 11 attacks, and was decommissioned in November 2002.

=== 2023 Vivek Ramaswamy visit ===
On October 7, 2023, Vivek Ramaswamy, then a candidate for the Republican nomination for the 2024 United States presidential election, visited the border crossing and suggested that National Guard troops could be stationed there in an effort to curtail illegal entry. Several months earlier, in June, a man from Brooklyn was arrested in another part of Pittsburg after authorities found nine people in the trunk of his vehicle; the man had allegedly helped them cross the border illegally. Ramaswamy also walked part of the Fourth Connecticut Lake Trail and visited another location where people reportedly entered the United States illegally by crossing a shallow stream.

Later that month, then-Governor of New Hampshire Chris Sununu announced the formation of the Northern Border Alliance Task Force, intended "to increase the presence and effectiveness of law enforcement in northern New Hampshire, particularly in communities in close proximity to the Canadian border." Sununu's successor, Kelly Ayotte, visited the border crossing in July 2025 and budgeted additional funds for the program. In September 2025, it was reported that the program had resulted in 47 arrests during its first year-and-a-half of operation. Critics of the program said that taxpayer dollars were being wasted, while supporters of the program said it acted as a deterrent against illegal border crossings.

=== 2026 shooting incident ===
In the early morning hours of February 22, 2026, an armed person shot at a United States Border Patrol agent near the Pittsburg border crossing. The Border Patrol agent, who was not injured, returned fire, striking the subject. The subject was subsequently taken to an area hospital. The Boston field office of the Federal Bureau of Investigation (FBI) was assigned to investigate the incident.

The person who shot at the Border Patrol agent was identified as a 26-year-old from Manchester, New Hampshire, Blu Zeke Daly, also known as Cullan Zeke Daly. The Border Patrol agent had first encountered Daly in Stewartstown, New Hampshire, where Daly drove away from the agent during questioning. The agent then followed Daly "at a distance" to the Pittsburg border crossing, which was closed at the time. (Note: The drive from Stewartstown to the border crossing in Pittsburg is approximately 30 miles (48 km). Daly may not have been aware that Beecher Falls, Vermont, which is located adjacent to Stewartstown, has a border facility that is open 24 hours a day.) At the closed border, the agent turned on the emergency lights of his vehicle and exited his vehicle; Daly then shot at the agent while attempting to turn around and drive away.

Charges were filed against Daly for attempted murder of a federal officer and assaulting a federal officer with a dangerous weapon. The United States Attorney assigned to the case stated, "This individual did have a previous Massachusetts driver's license that was denominated to be male and now has a New Hampshire driver's license, which is denominated to be female. So, it's a reasonable assumption that the person has decided to transition their gender."

== See also ==
- List of Canada–United States border crossings
