= Rivière au Saumon (Le Haut-Saint-François) =

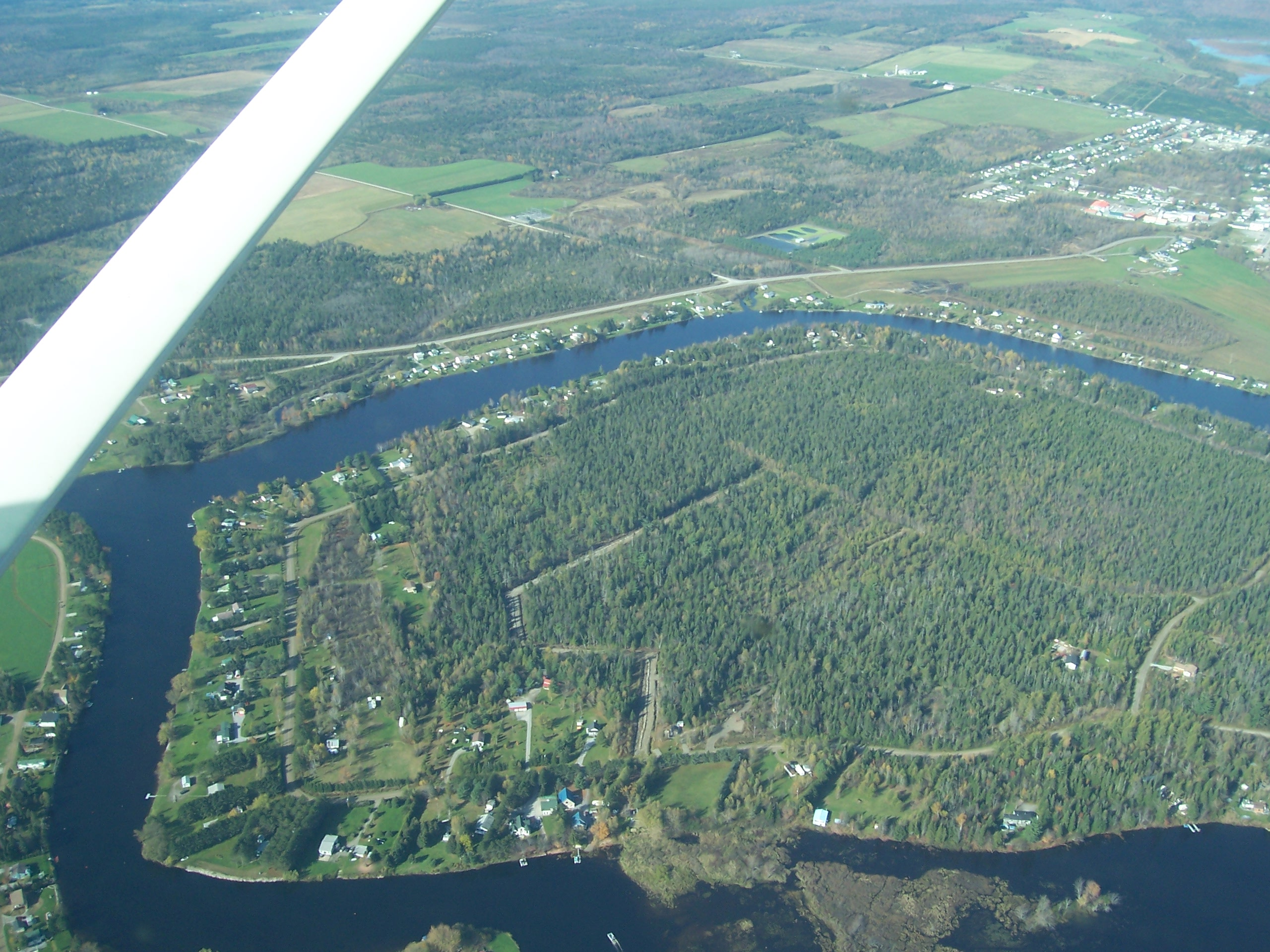

Location
- Country: Canada
- Province: Quebec
- Region: Estrie
- MRC: Le Haut-Saint-François Regional County Municipality
- Municipality: Weedon

Physical characteristics
- Source: Lake Danger
  - location: Weedon
  - coordinates: 45°19′42″N 71°00′21″W
  - elevation: 631 m (2,070 ft)
- Mouth: Saint-François River
  - location: Weedon
  - coordinates: 45°40′58″N 71°26′43″W
  - elevation: 250 m (820 ft)
- Length: 77.0 km (47.8 mi)

Basin features
- Progression: Saint-François River, Saint Lawrence River
- Tributaries
  - left: (upstream) 10 streams, Bown stream, 7 streams, Dutch stream, stream, Prévost stream, Galt stream, Paul stream, Labbé stream, Mining stream, Beauregard stream, Desautels stream, Audet stream, mountain stream.
  - right: (upstream) Lac à la Truite outlet, stream, outlet of several small lakes, stream, McGill stream, 6 streams, Dell stream, Rouge River (rivière au Saumon) (McLeod stream), Mountain stream, Girard stream, Fortier stream, Thomas stream, Boutin stream, Chesham River, Morin Creek.

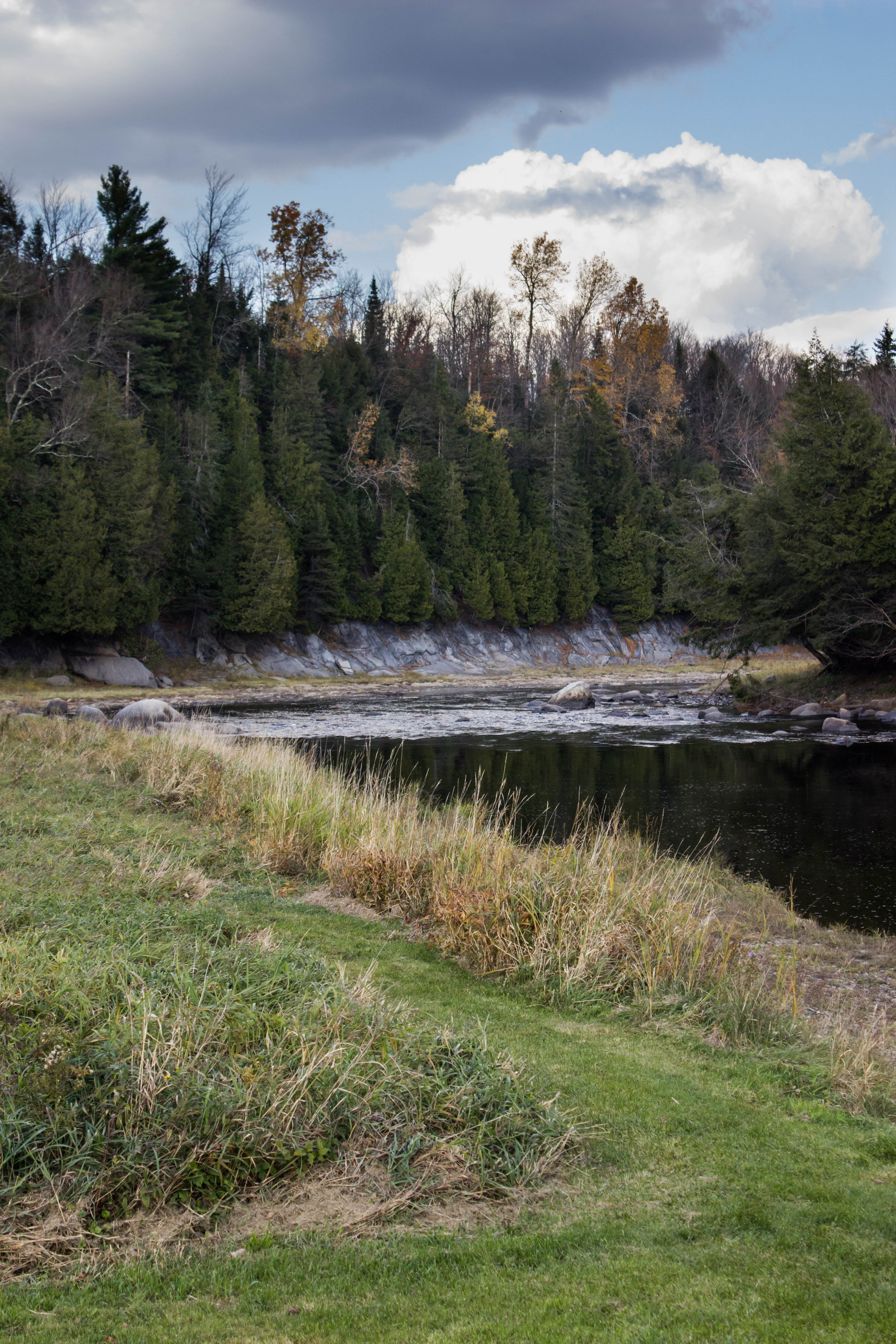
The "rivière au Saumon" near the bridge McVetty-McKenzie.

The rivière au Saumon (English: Salmon River) is a tributary of Saint-François River, flowing in administrative region of Estrie, in the province of Quebec, in Canada. The course of the river successively crosses the following municipalities:

- Le Granit Regional County Municipality (MRC): municipality of Notre-Dame-des-Bois;
- Le Haut-Saint-François Regional County Municipality (MRC): municipalities of La Patrie, Hampden, Lingwick and Weedon.

Besides the village areas, forestry and agriculture are the main economic activities in this valley.

The surface of the Salmon River is usually frozen from mid-December to mid-March, except the rapids areas; however, safe circulation on the ice is generally from late December to early March.

== Geography ==
The Rivière au Saumon rises in Danger Lake (length: 0.175 km (0.109 mi); altitude: 631 m (2,070 ft)), near the United States border and flows north over a distance of 77.0 km (47.8 mi) to its confluence with the Saint-François River.

The hydrographic slopes neighboring the "Rivière au Saumon" are:

- north side: Saint-François River,
- east side: Chesham River, Rouge River (rivière au Saumon);
- south side: Ditton River, North Eaton River, Bown Creek;
- west side: Eaton River.

The "Rivière au Saumon" is divided into two arms, the southern branch (Ditton River), near Chartierville and the eastern branch. It is subject to floods and sudden drops, submerging a large expanse of lowland that borders its banks. It was navigated by fishing boats and offered the settlers who lived on its shores a good means of transport (Rouillard, 1914). It is joined by the Ditton River near the village of La Patrie, and continues towards Scotstown, Lingwick, where it is crossed by the McVetty-McKenzie Bridge near Fontainebleau, then flows into the Saint-François River at Weedon. Its flow being more pronounced than that of the Saint-François River, many spring floods occur in this sector.

From the mouth of Danger Lake, the course of the Salmon River descends on 77.0 km (47.8 mi), with a drop of 388 m (1,273 ft), according to the following segments:

Upper course of the salmon river (segment of 41.1 km (25.5 mi))

- 17.5 km (10.9 mi) to the west, forming numerous very small streamers crossing a variety of forest and agricultural areas, entering the municipality La Patrie (MRC Le Haut-Saint-François Regional County Municipality), as well as collecting the Morin stream (coming from the north), to the confluence of the Chesham river (coming from the northeast);
- 6.7 km (4.2 mi) to the west, forming a slight and large curve to the north, collecting the Audet, Desaultels, Beauregard rivers as well as the Ditton River (coming from the south), forming a hook towards the north, up to a bend in the river;
- 5.6 km (3.5 mi) north first in the agricultural zone, crossing the route 212 East at 1.2 km (0.75 mi) to the east from the center of the village of La Patrie, to Fortier stream (coming from the east). Note: This segment of the river passes on the west side of Mont-Mégantic National Park;
- 6.4 km (4.0 mi) towards the north-west, forming two loops towards the east, collecting the mountain stream (coming from the east), up to the McLoed stream (coming from the is);
- 4.9 km (3.0 mi) towards the north-west by entering the municipality of Hampden, by forming a loop towards the north-east, then by entering the municipality of Scotstown, to a bend corresponding to a widening of the river on the northeast side of the village of Scotstown and to the outlet of Dell Brook (coming from the north). Note: On this last segment, the course of the river delimits the western part of Marécage des Scots Regional Park;

Lower course of the salmon river (segment of 35.9 km (22.3 mi))

- 12.4 km (7.7 mi) westward crossing on the north side of the village of Scotstown, then descending into a deep valley, entering Lingwick, collecting the Dutch creek (coming from south- east) and Bown Creek (coming from the south), to a bend in the river, located at the bottom of a loop facing west;
- 8.5 km (5.3 mi) to the northwest route 108, cutting it by forming a loop before collecting McGill stream (coming from the east and overlooking the outlet of Lake McGill and Lake Moffatt), the mouth of which is located 0.8 km (0.50 mi) west of the center of the hamlet Gould, up to a bend in the river;
- 4.9 km (3.0 mi) to the north, bypassing an island and forming a loop to the east, to a stream (coming from the north);
- 10.1 km (6.3 mi) first towards the northwest by entering Weedon, cutting the path of the Rivière au Saumon at 1.6 km (0.99 mi) south of the village center of Fontainebleau, then west, to its mouth.
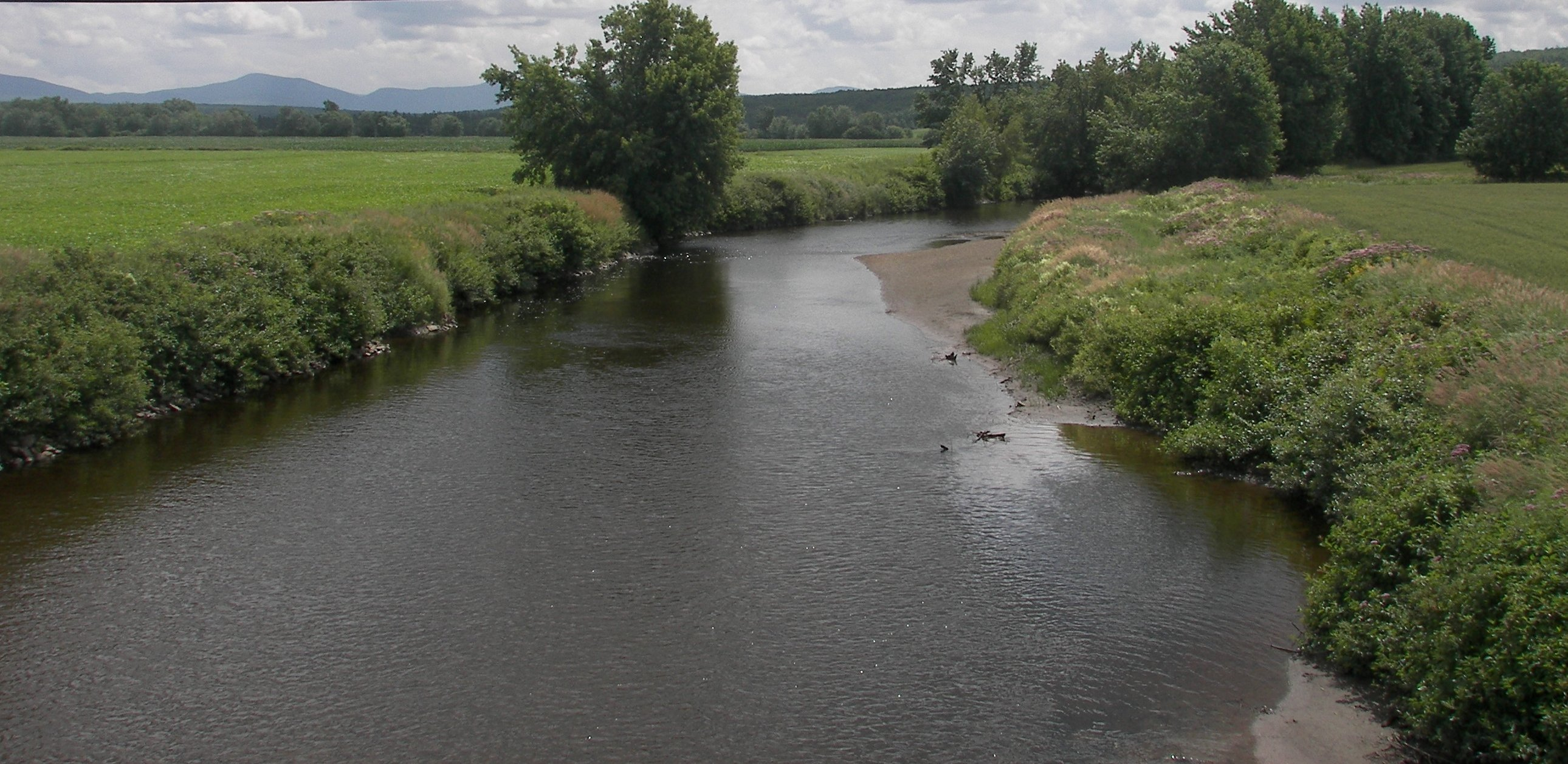
Salmon river near La Patrie. The northern flank of the White Mountains is in the background. The river has its source there.

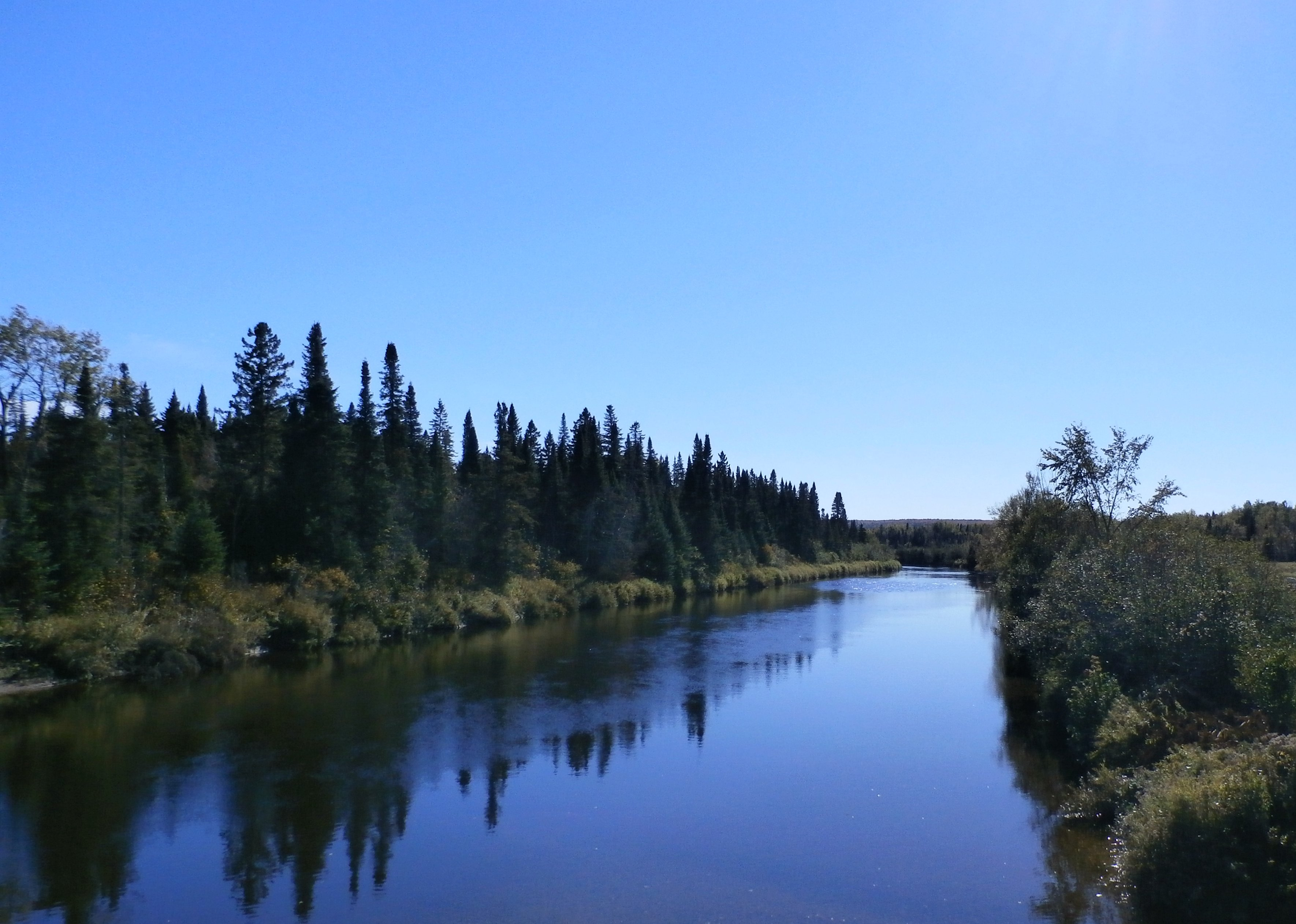
Rivière au Saumon at the Chemin du Quatre Milles bridge which leads to Rang Cohoes between Scotstown and La Patrie.

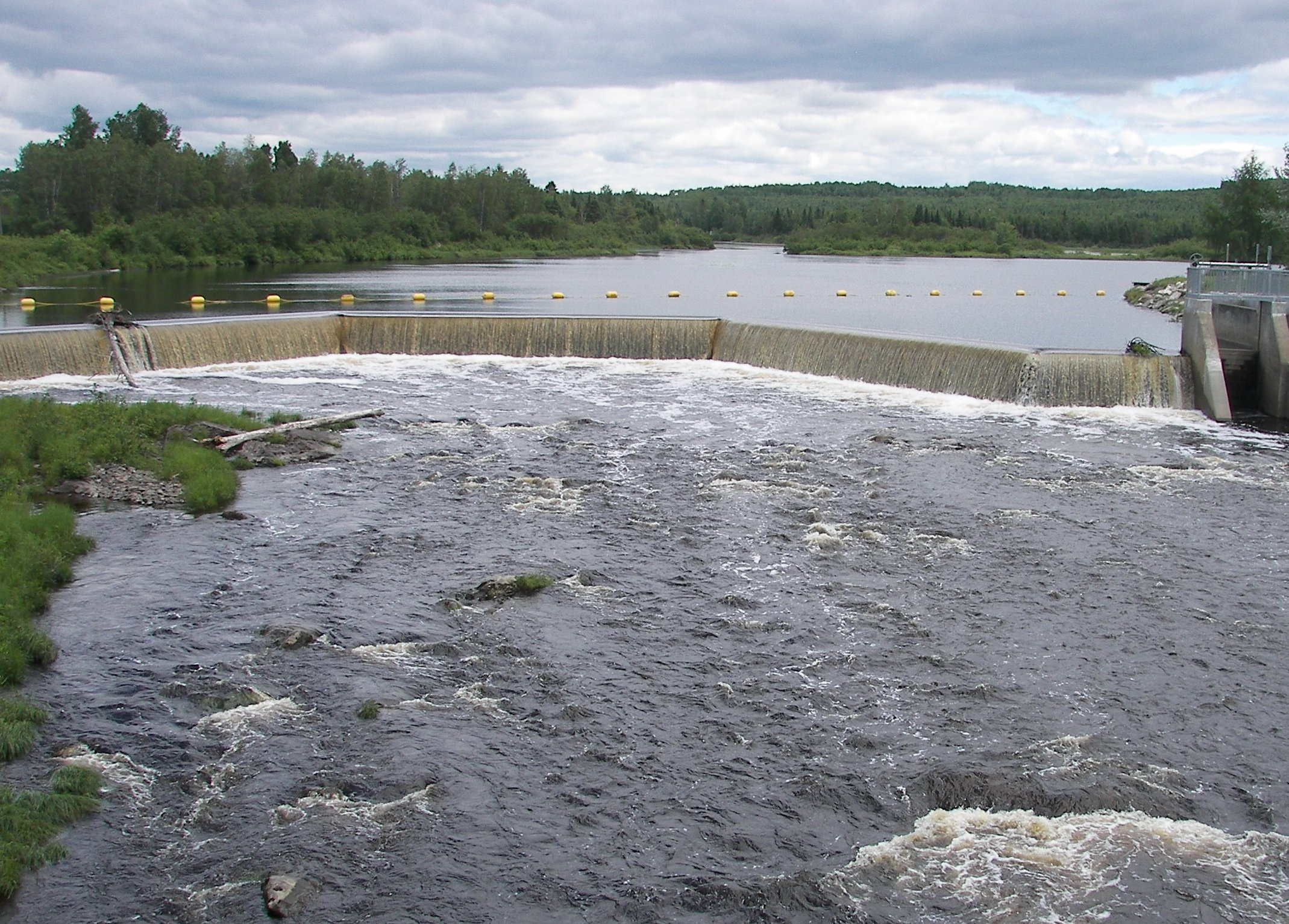
Salmon River in Scotstown.

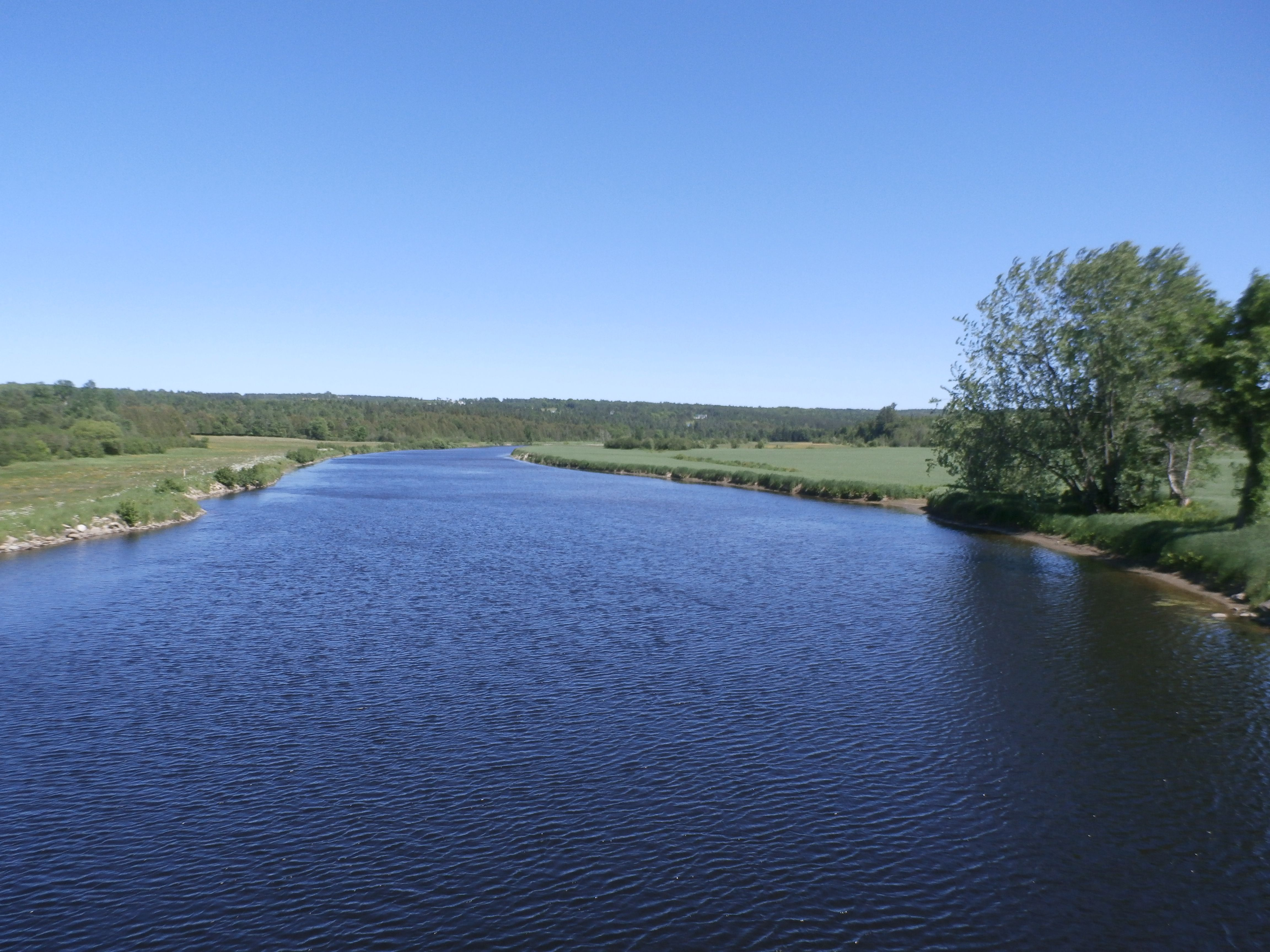
Rivière au Saumon upstream from the bridge over Chemin de la Rivière aux Saumons near Fontainebleau (Weedon).

== Toponymy ==
The toponym "Rivière au Saumon" was formalized on December 5, 1968, at the Commission de toponymie du Québec.
