= Saint-Adrien, Quebec =

Saint-Adrien
- Municipality
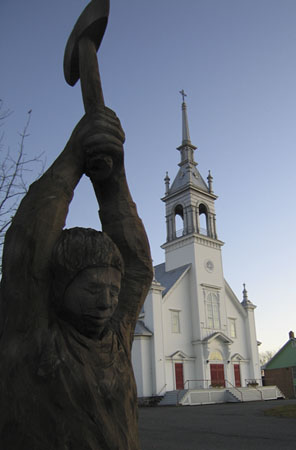

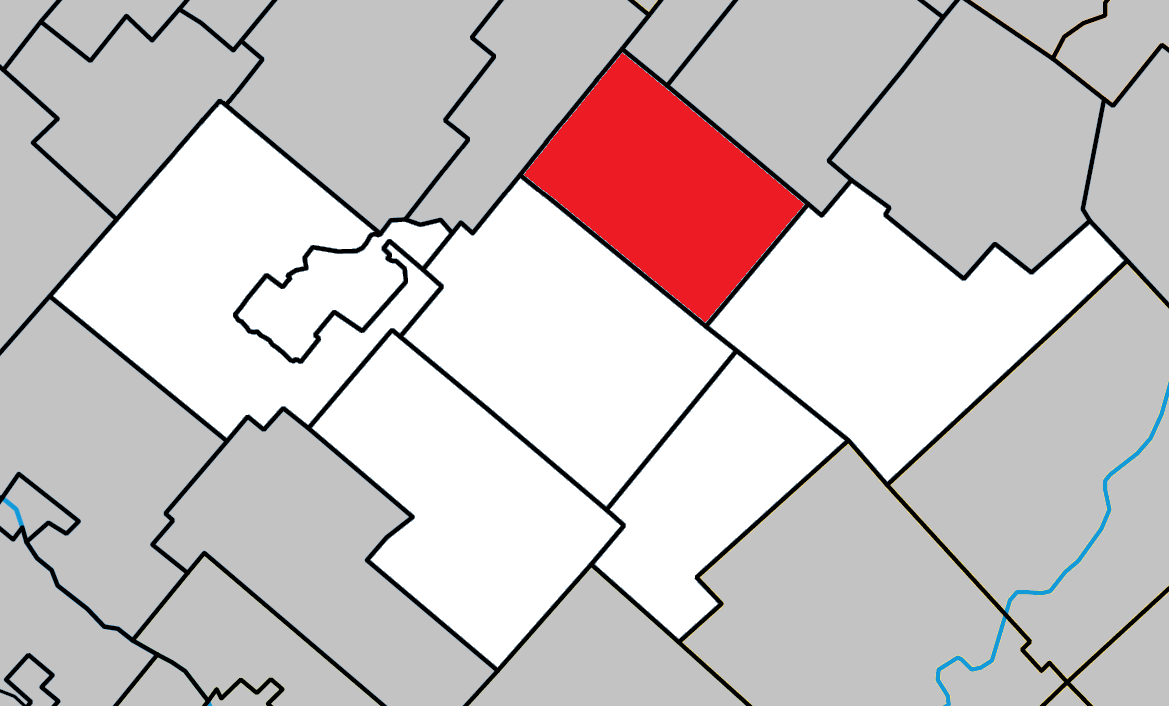
- Location within Les Sources RCM

- Location in southern Quebec
- Coordinates: 45°49′N 71°43′W
- Country: Canada
- Province: Quebec
- Region: Estrie
- RCM: Les Sources
- Constituted: January 1, 1879

Government
  - Mayor: Emilie Windsor
  - Federal riding: Richmond—Arthabaska—des-Sources
  - Prov. riding: Mégantic

Area
  - Total: 98.80 km^{2} (38.15 sq mi)
  - Land: 98.71 km^{2} (38.11 sq mi)

Population (2016)
  - Total: 522
  - Density: 5.3/km^{2} (14/sq mi)
  - Pop 2011-2016: ▲6.5%
- Time zone: UTC−5 (EST)
  - Summer (DST): UTC−4 (EDT)
- Postal code(s): J0A 1C0
- Area code: 819
- Highways: R-216; R-257
- Website: www.st-adrien.com

Saint-Adrien (French pronunciation: [sɛ̃t‿adʁijɛ̃]) is a municipality located in the Estrie region of Quebec, Canada.
