= Rouge River (rivière au Saumon) =

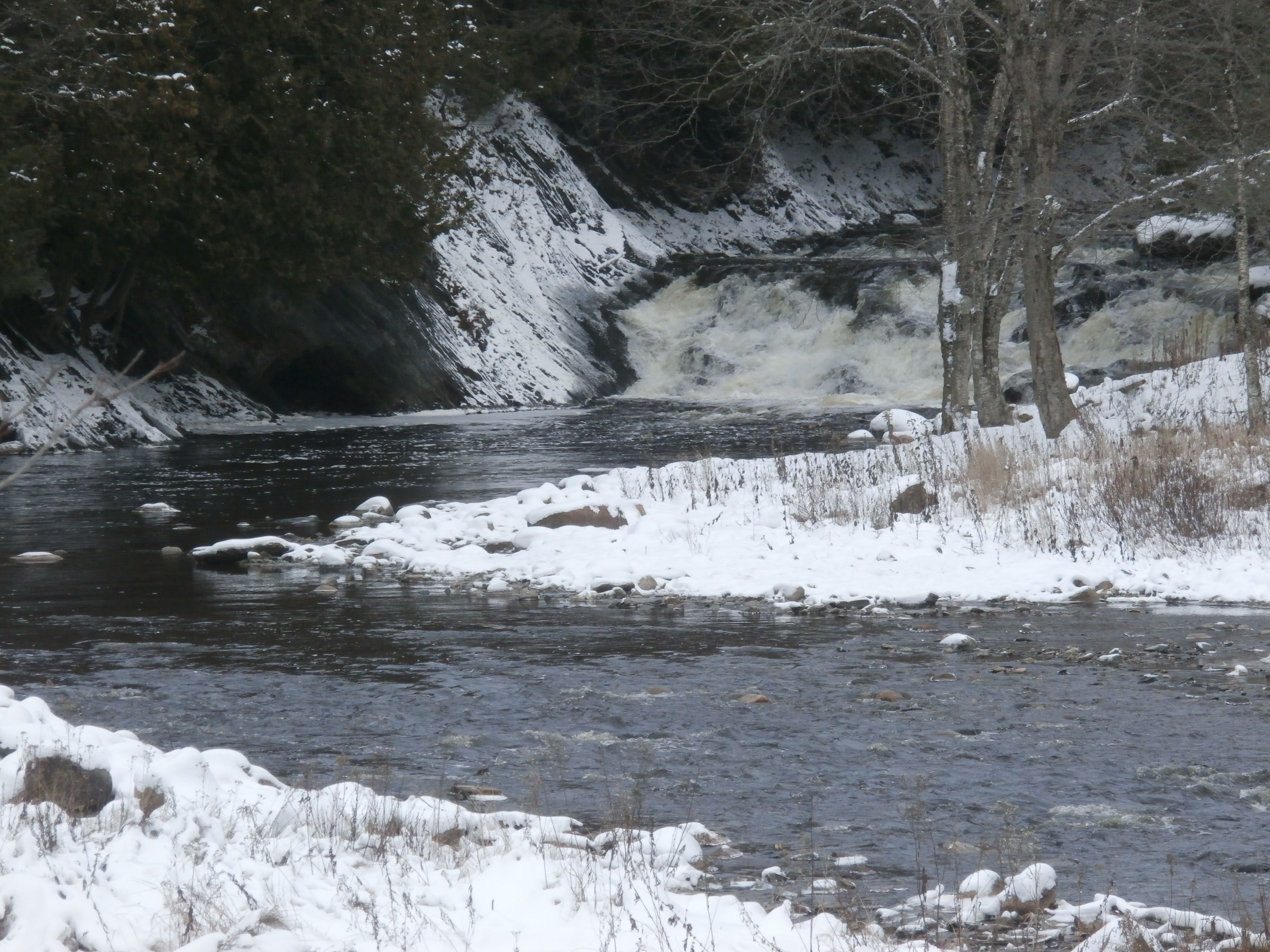
- Rouge River upstream from the Fontainebleau road bridge.

Location
- Country: Canada
- Province: Quebec
- Region: Estrie
- MRC: Le Granit Regional County Municipality and Le Haut-Saint-François Regional County Municipality

Physical characteristics
- Source: Confluence of two mountain streams
  - location: Milan
  - coordinates: 45°36′56″N 71°09′32″W
  - elevation: 509 m (1,670 ft)
- Mouth: Saint-François River
  - location: Lingwick
  - coordinates: 45°38′27″N 71°22′36″W
  - elevation: 250 metres (820 ft)
- Length: 26.3 km (16.3 mi)

Basin features
- Progression: Rivière au Saumon, Saint-François River, Saint Lawrence River
- Tributaries
  - left: (upstream) 2 streams, mountain stream.
  - right: (upstream) Ferré stream, 5 streams.

The Rivière Rouge is a tributary of the rivière au Saumon. This river flows in the municipalities of Milan (MRC Le Granit Regional County Municipality) and Lingwick (MRC) Le Haut-Saint-François Regional County Municipality), in the administrative region of Estrie, in the province of Quebec, in Canada.

Forestry is the main economic activity in this valley; agriculture, second.

The surface of the Salmon River is usually frozen from mid-December to mid-March, except the rapids areas; however, safe circulation on the ice is generally from late December to early March.

== Geography ==
The Red River has its source at the confluence of two mountain streams, at an altitude of 509 m (1,670 ft) on the western side of the mountain, in the municipality of Milan. This source is located 4.0 km (2.5 mi) northwest of the village center of Milan and 1.0 km (0.62 mi) south of a summit mountain (altitude: 580 m (1,900 ft).

From its source, the Red River flows over 26.3 km (16.3 mi), with a drop of 259 m (850 ft), according to the following segments:

- 3.0 km (1.9 mi) south-west, down the mountain, to a stream (coming from the south-east);
- 9.1 km (5.7 mi) towards the west especially in the forest zone (sometimes agricultural), by forming a curve towards the south, crossing two series of rapids, until the route 108;
- 7.7 km (4.8 mi) to the northwest, entering a large area of marsh where the river winds more and more, collecting the Ferré stream (coming from the northeast), collecting another stream (from the south) to the outlet (from the north) of Lac Brochet;
- 6.5 km (4.0 mi) first towards the west on 1.9 km (1.2 mi) in the marsh area to a bend of the river corresponding to the discharge of a stream (coming from the north -Where is); then south in an increasingly steep valley, crossing two series of rapids, to its mouth.

The red river flows on the northeast bank of the rivière au Saumon. This confluence is located 3.9 km (2.4 mi) north-west of the center of the village of Lingwick.

== Toponymy ==
Formerly, this river was designated "Albion River".

The toponym "Rivière Rouge" was formalized on December 18, 1979, at the Commission de toponymie du Québec.

== See also ==
- List of rivers of Quebec
