= Lingwick =

- Township municipality
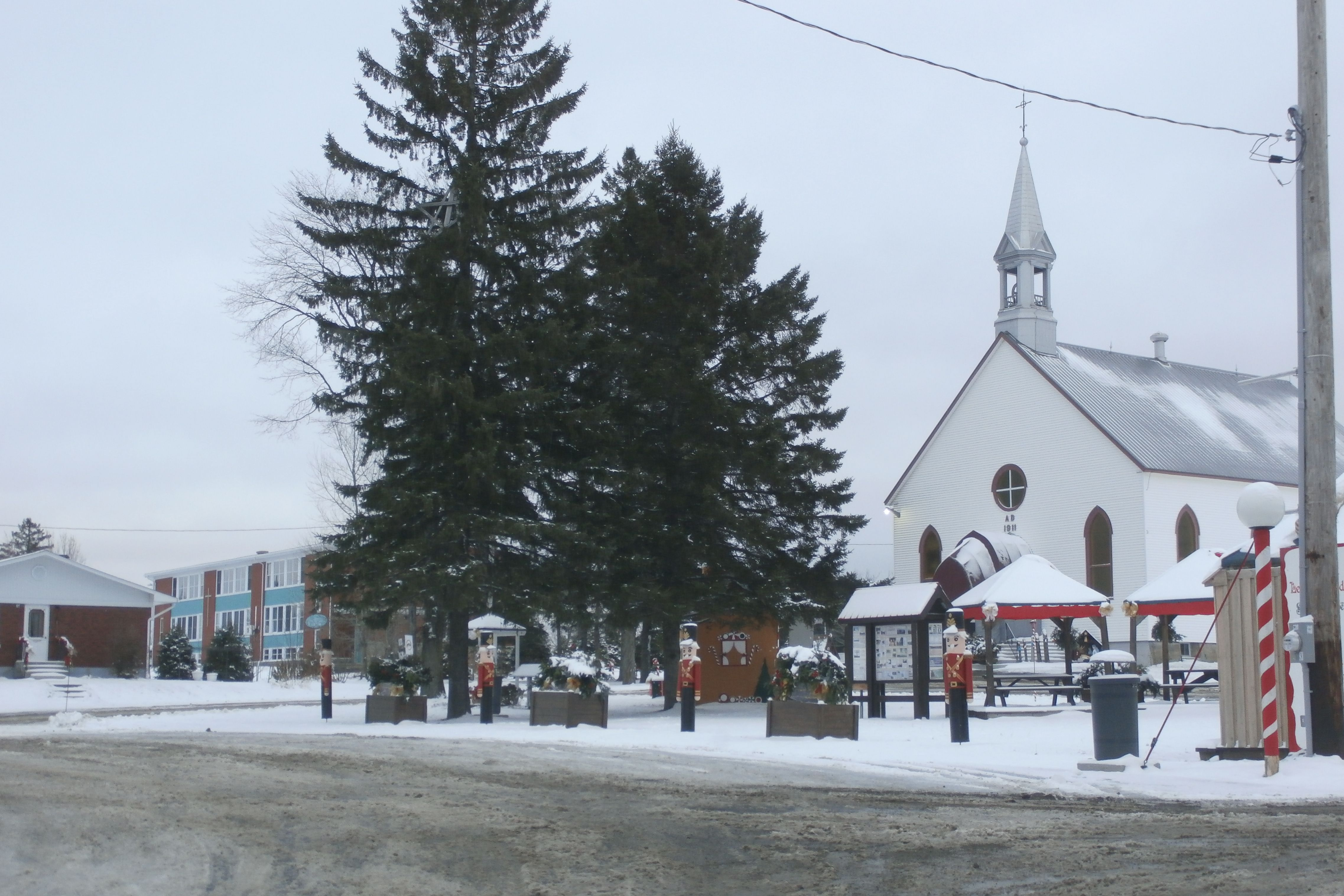
- Sainte-Marguerite Church

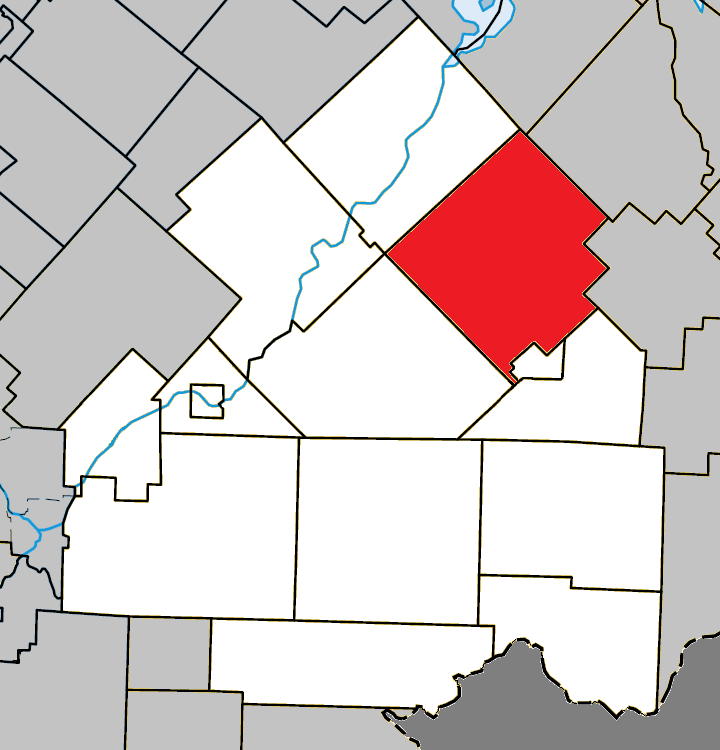
- Location within Le Haut-Saint-François RCM

- Location in southern Quebec
- Coordinates: 45.58°N 71.33°W
- Country: Canada
- Province: Quebec
- Region: Estrie
- RCM: Le Haut-Saint-François
- Constituted: July 1, 1855

Government
  - Mayor: Caroline Poirier
  - Federal riding: Compton—Stanstead
  - Prov. riding: Mégantic

Area
  - Total: 249.60 km^{2} (96.37 sq mi)
  - Land: 243.01 km^{2} (93.83 sq mi)

Population (2021)
  - Total: 456
  - Density: 1.9/km^{2} (4.9/sq mi)
  - Pop 2016-2021: ▲6.5%
  - Dwellings: 334
- Time zone: UTC−5 (EST)
  - Summer (DST): UTC−4 (EDT)
- Postal code(s): J0B 2Z0
- Area code: 819
- Highways: R-108; R-214; R-257
- Website: www.cantondelingwick.com

Lingwick is a township of about 500 people in Le Haut-Saint-François Regional County Municipality in the Estrie region of Quebec, Canada.

It incorporates the former villages of Gould and Sainte-Marguerite.

== Demographics ==
=== Population ===
In the 2021 Census of Population conducted by Statistics Canada, Lingwick had a population of 456 living in 222 of its 334 total private dwellings, a change of 6.5% from its 2016 population of 428. With a land area of 243.01 km^{2} (93.83 sq mi), it had a population density of 1.9/km^{2} (4.9/sq mi) in 2021.

Historical Census Data - Lingwick, Quebec

Year	Pop.	±%
1861	564	—
1871	801	+42.0%
1881	1,035	+29.2%
1891	1,022	−1.3%
1901	791	−22.6%
1911	839	+6.1%
1921	724	−13.7%
1931	669	−7.6%

Year	Pop.	±%
1941	812	+21.4%
1951	823	+1.4%
1956	868	+5.5%
1961	798	−8.1%
1966	652	−18.3%
1971	607	−6.9%
1976	506	−16.6%
1981	479	−5.3%

Year	Pop.	±%
1986	451	−5.8%
1991	436	−3.3%
1996	425	−2.5%
2001	419	−1.4%
2006	611	+45.8%
2011	399	−34.7%
2016	428	+7.3%
2021	456	+6.5%

=== Language ===
Mother tongue (2021)

Language	Population	Pct (%)
French only	395	86.8%
English only	55	12.1%
English and French	5	1.1%

== See also ==
- List of anglophone communities in Quebec
