= Quebec Route 257 =

Highway in Quebec, Canada

Route 257

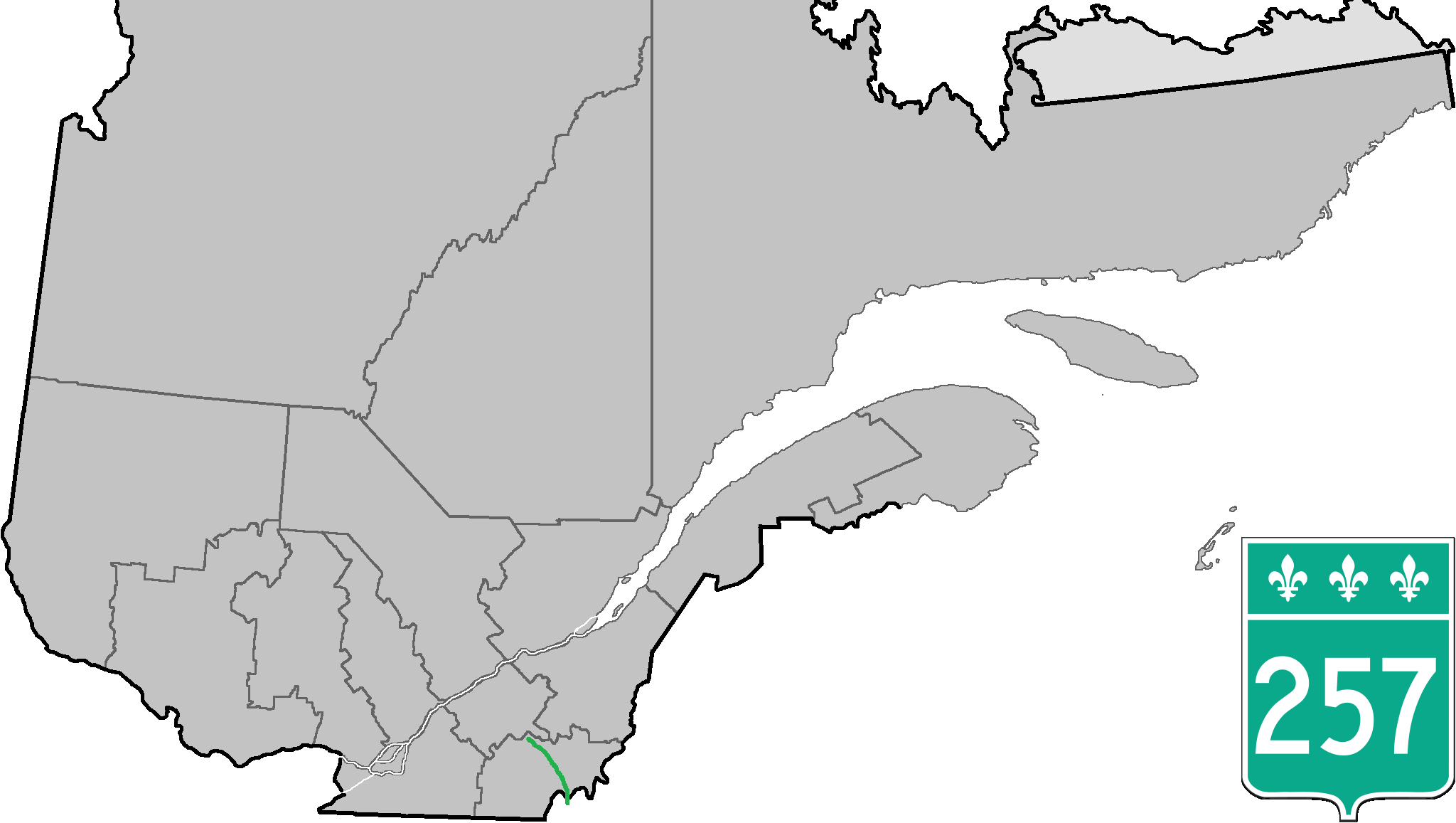

Route information
- Length: 85 km (53 mi)

Major junctions
- South end: US 3 at the U.S. border in Chartierville
- R-112 at Weedon; R-108 at Gould
- North end: R-216 in Saint-Adrien

Location
- Country: Canada
- Province: Quebec
- Major cities: Weedon, Scotstown

Highway system
- Quebec provincial highways; Autoroutes; List; Former
← R-255	→ R-259

Route 257 is a north–south highway on the south shore of the St. Lawrence River, in the Eastern Townships region of Quebec, Canada. Its northern terminus is in Saint-Adrien at a junction with Route 216, and its southern terminus is at the Pittsburg–Chartierville Border Crossing, where it becomes U.S. Route 3 as it enters Pittsburg, New Hampshire.

== Towns along Route 257 ==
- Saint-Adrien
- Ham-Sud
- Weedon
- Lingwick
- Scotstown
- La Patrie
- Chartierville
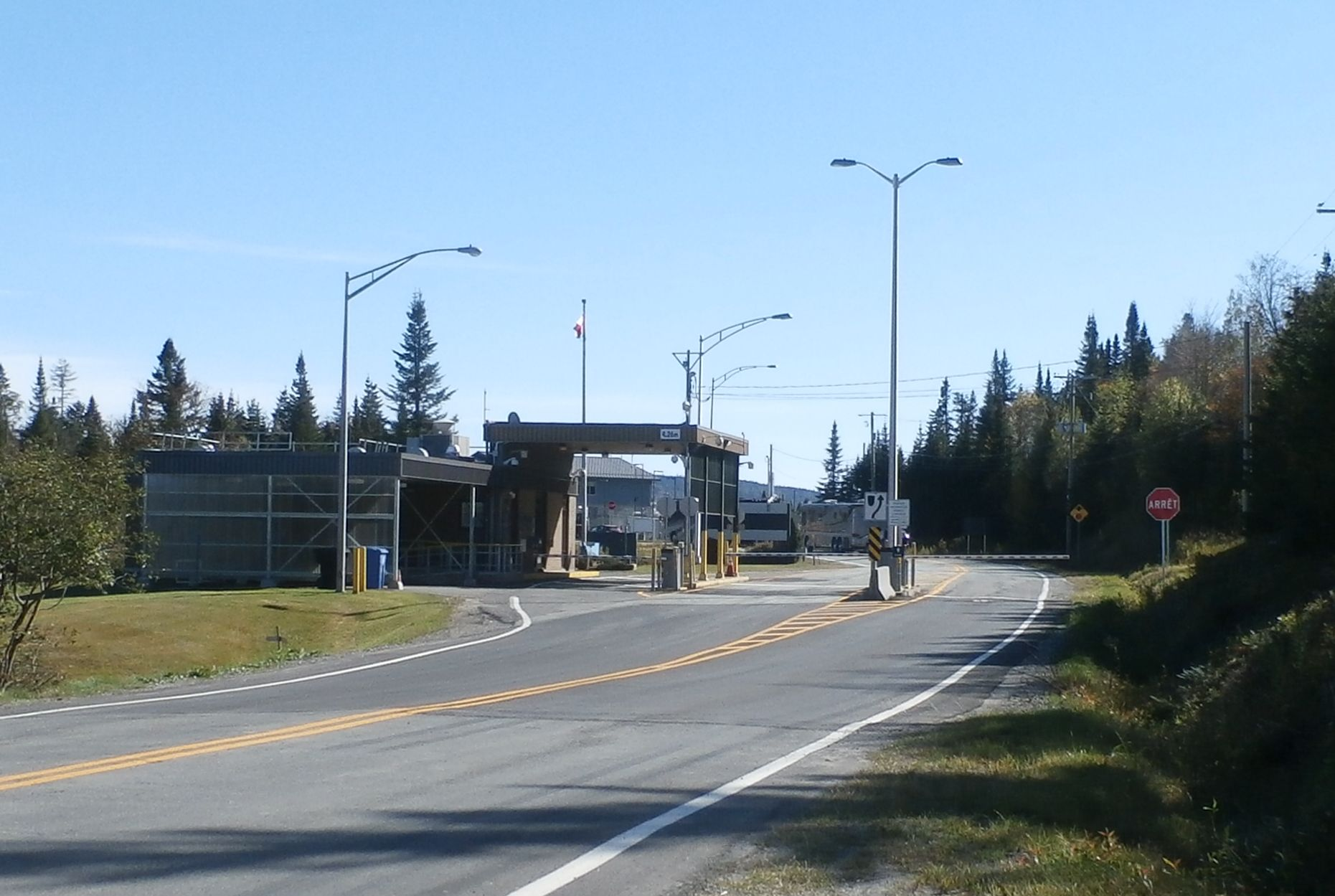
South end of Route 257 at Chartierville border control.

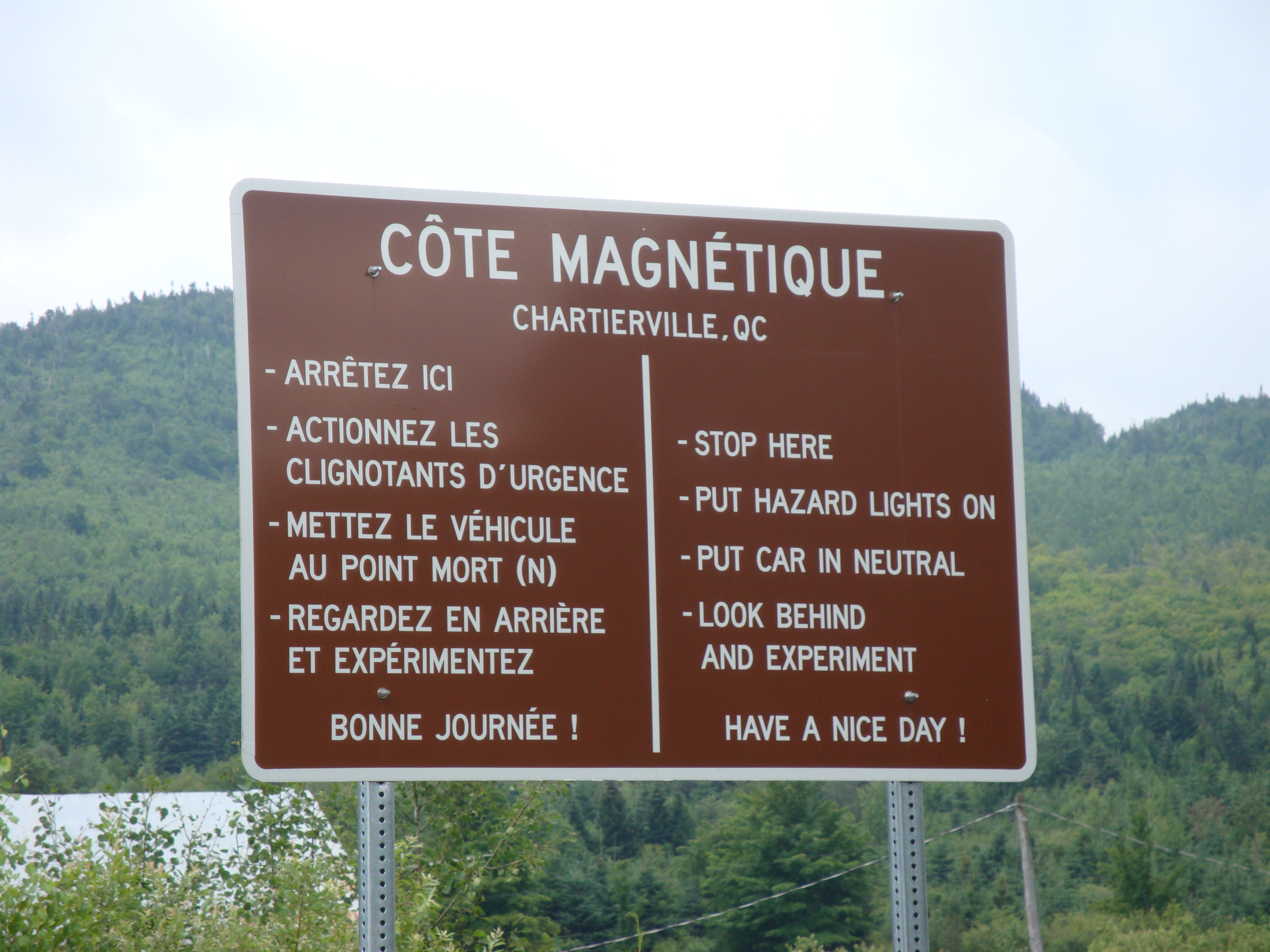
In Chartierville, a posted magnetic hill.

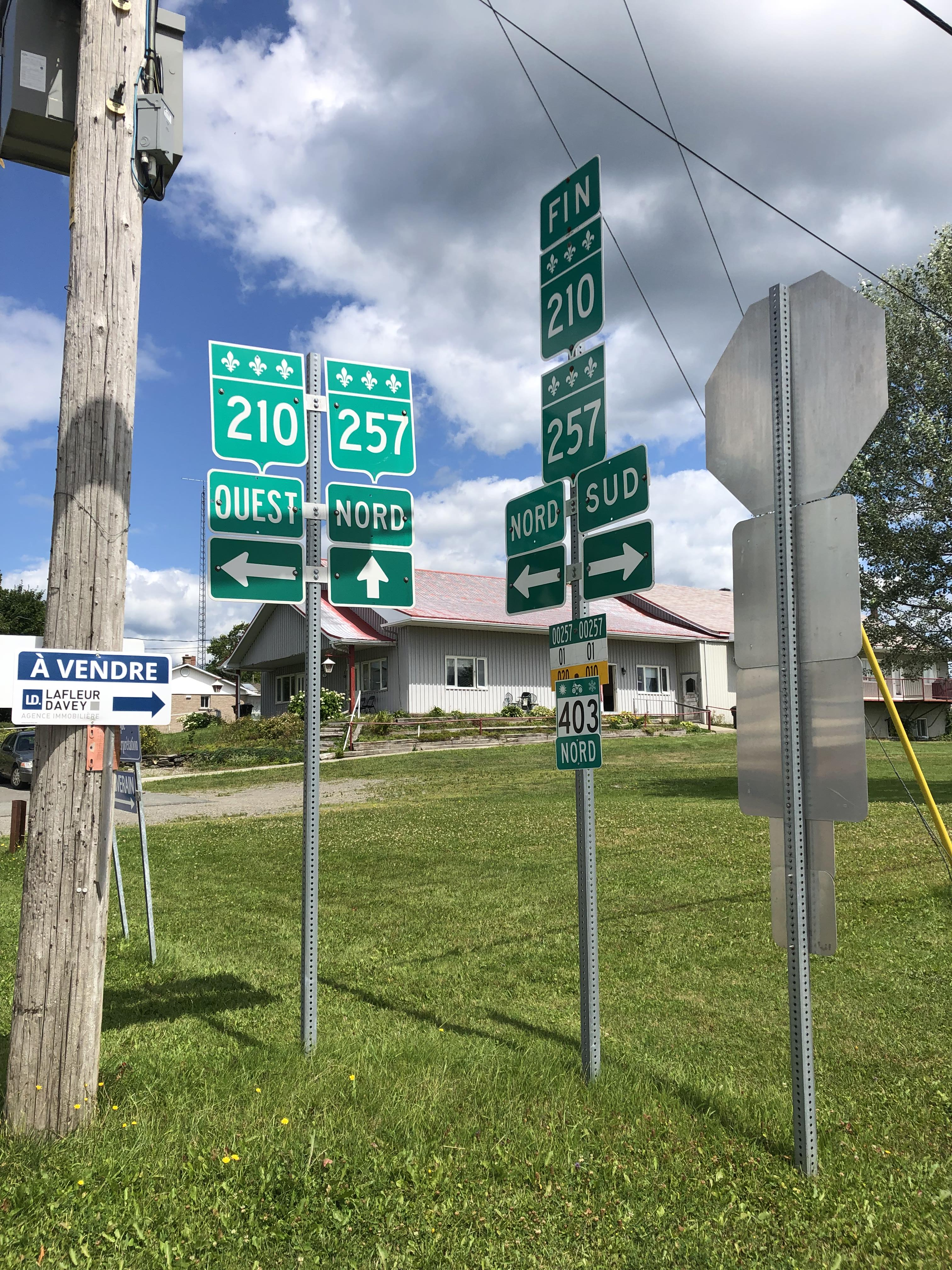
Junction with 210 in Chartierville.

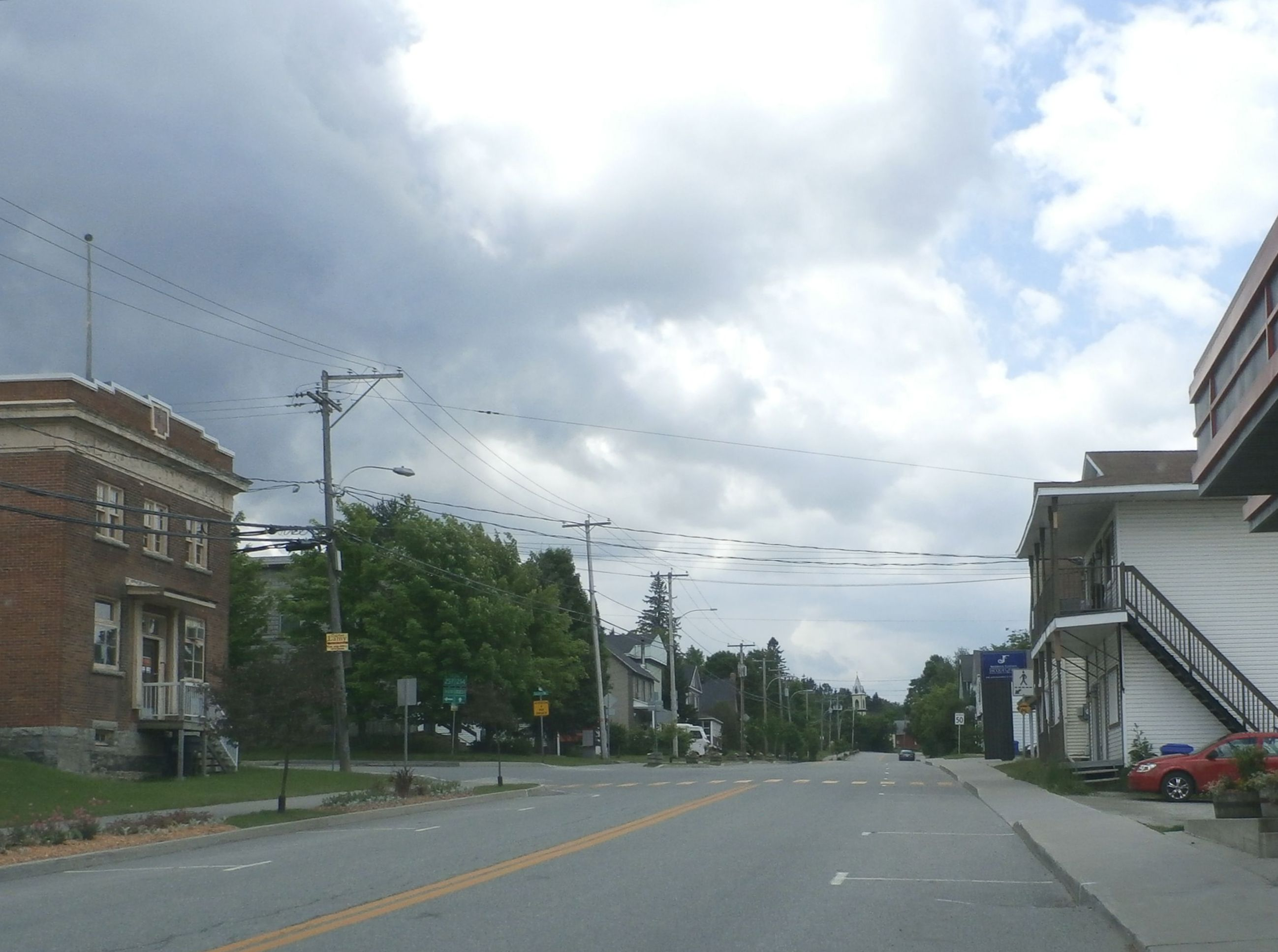
Routes 214 and 257 in Scotstown.

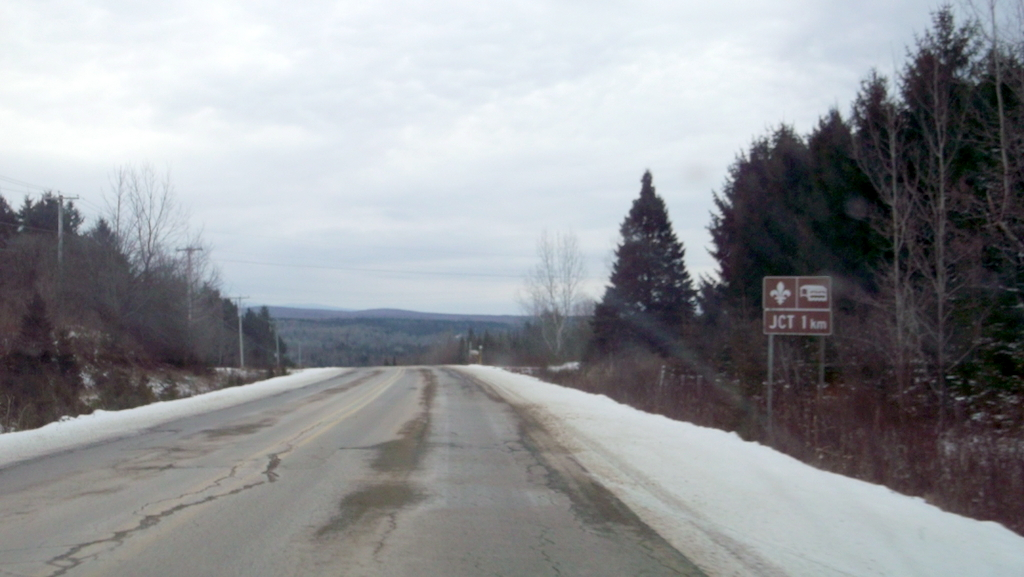
Route 257 in Lingwick.

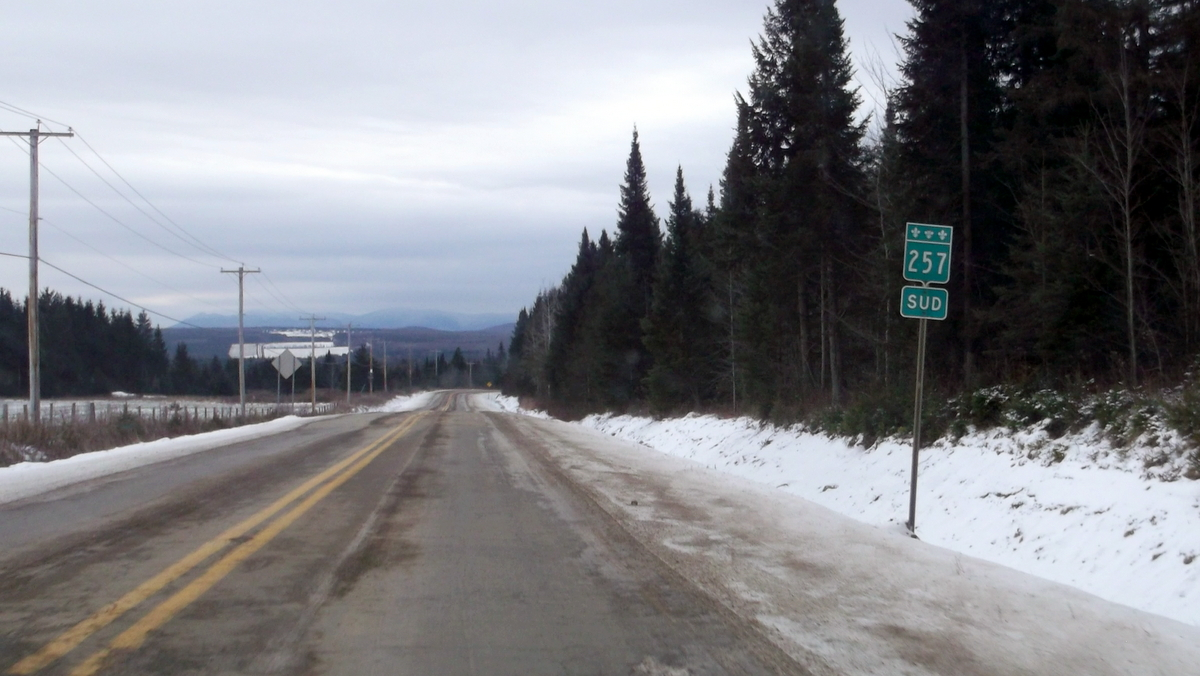
Route 257 near Weedon.

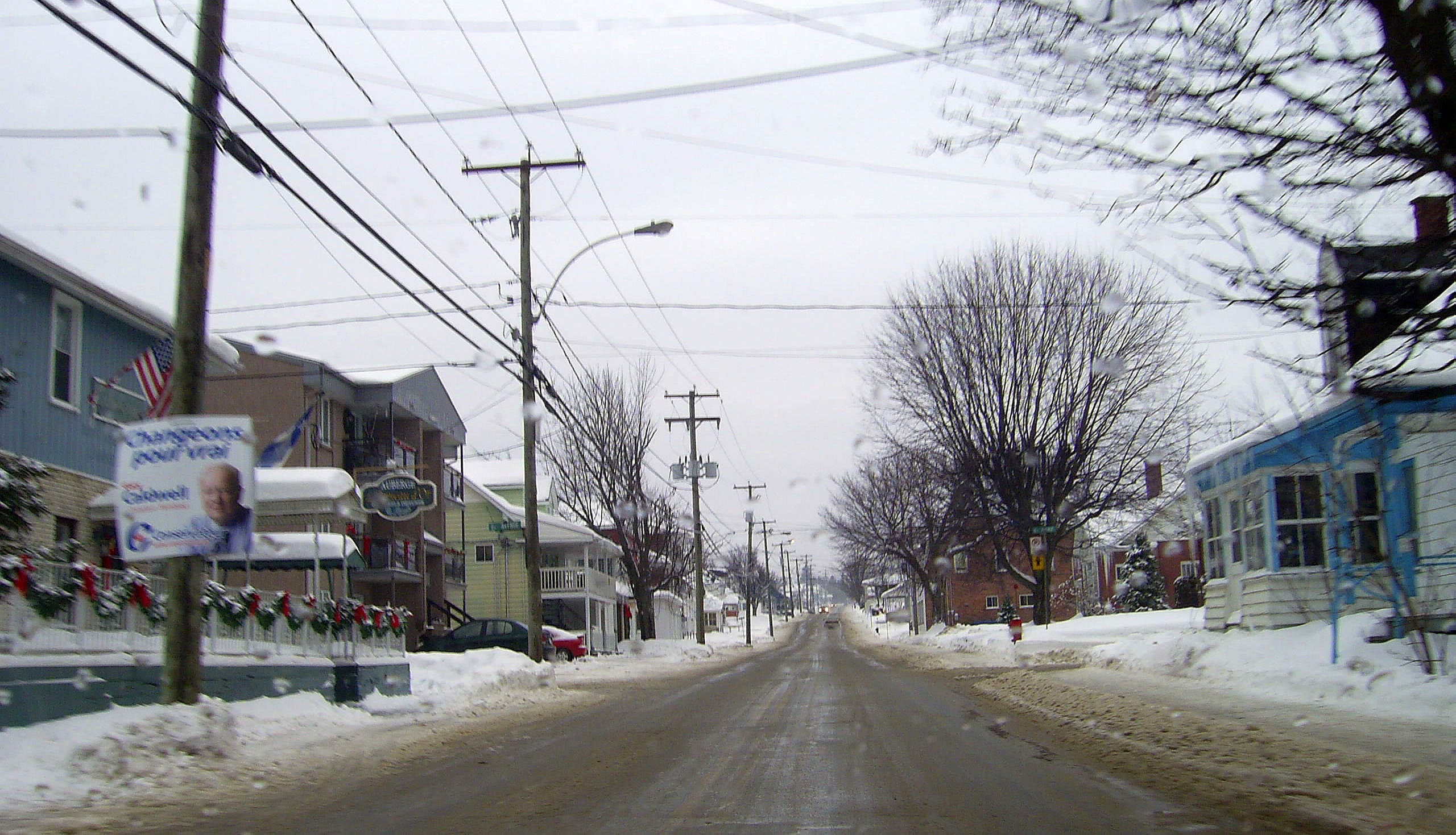
Saint-Janvier street in Weedon.

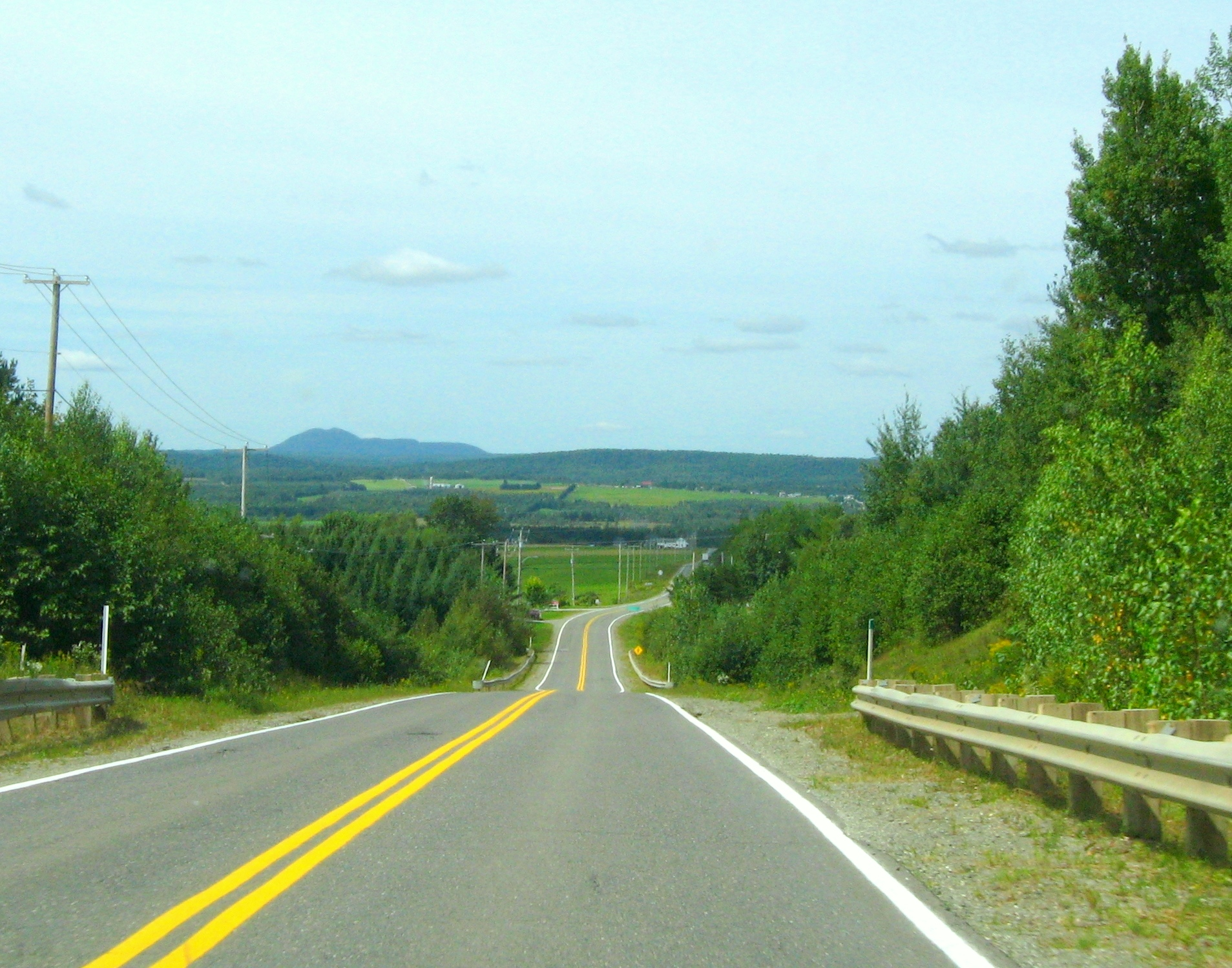
Route 257 towards mont Ham.

== See also ==
- List of Quebec provincial highways
