= Chartierville =

- Municipality
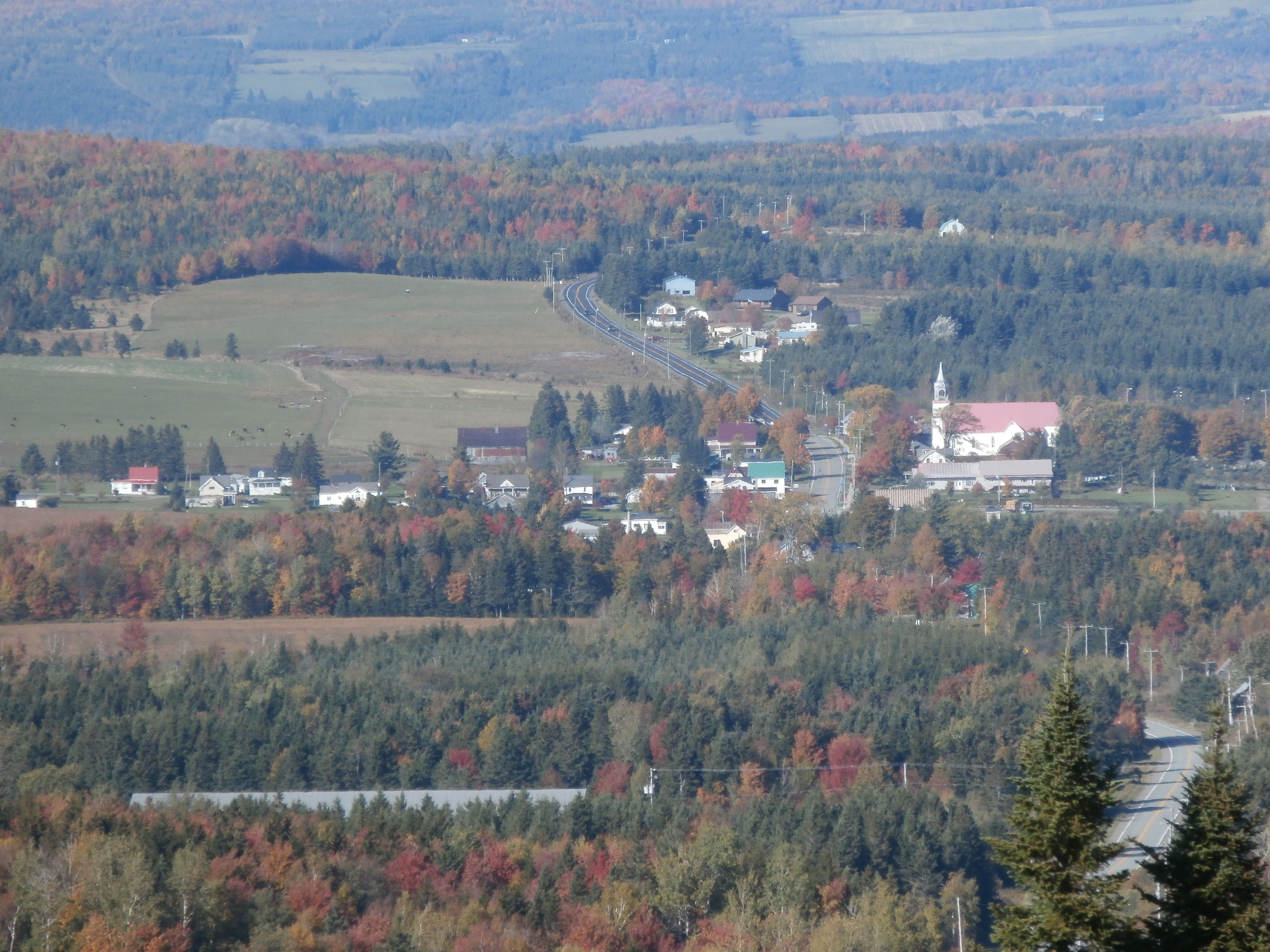

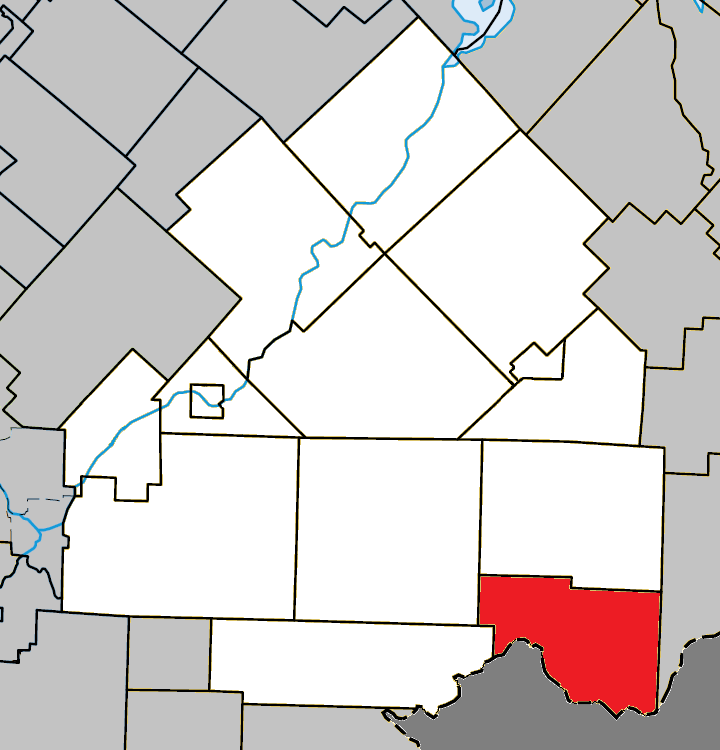
- Location within Le Haut-Saint-François RCM

- Location in southern Quebec
- Coordinates: 45.3°N 71.2°W
- Country: Canada
- Province: Quebec
- Region: Estrie
- RCM: Le Haut-Saint-François
- Constituted: January 1, 1879
- Named for: Jean-Baptiste Chartier

Government
  - Mayor: Denis Dion
  - Federal riding: Compton—Stanstead
  - Prov. riding: Mégantic

Area
  - Total: 142.60 km^{2} (55.06 sq mi)
  - Land: 141.94 km^{2} (54.80 sq mi)

Population (2021)
  - Total: 319
  - Density: 2.2/km^{2} (5.7/sq mi)
  - Pop 2016-2021: ▲15.6%
  - Dwellings: 231
- Time zone: UTC−5 (EST)
  - Summer (DST): UTC−4 (EDT)
- Postal code(s): J0B 1K0
- Area code: 819
- Highways: R-210; R-257
- Website: www.chartierville.ca

Chartierville (French pronunciation: [ʃaʁtjevil]) is a small municipality of about 300 people in Le Haut-Saint-François Regional County Municipality, in the Estrie region of Quebec, Canada, on the Canada–United States border.

Chartierville is located on Quebec Route 257, which has its southern terminus at the Pittsburg–Chartierville Border Crossing, and Quebec Route 210, which has its eastern terminus in Chartierville.

Prior to its founding in 1870 by colonists from Saint-Hyacinthe, gold-seekers flocked to the area. This patch of land, 142 square kilometres (55 sq mi) in area and 505 metres (1,657 ft) in altitude, is one of the highest regions in Quebec.

== Geography ==
=== Climate ===
Climate data for Chartierville
Month	Jan	Feb	Mar	Apr	May	Jun	Jul	Aug	Sep	Oct	Nov	Dec	Year
Record high °C (°F)	13.9 (57.0)	15 (59)	20.5 (68.9)	28 (82)	29.5 (85.1)	31 (88)	31.5 (88.7)	31.7 (89.1)	32.5 (90.5)	26 (79)	21 (70)	15 (59)	32.5 (90.5)
Mean daily maximum °C (°F)	−6.9 (19.6)	−4.2 (24.4)	0.8 (33.4)	8.4 (47.1)	15.9 (60.6)	20.4 (68.7)	22.7 (72.9)	21.7 (71.1)	17.6 (63.7)	10 (50)	3.4 (38.1)	−3.7 (25.3)	8.9 (48.0)
Daily mean °C (°F)	−11.7 (10.9)	−9.2 (15.4)	−4.3 (24.3)	3.5 (38.3)	10.4 (50.7)	15 (59)	17.5 (63.5)	16.6 (61.9)	12.5 (54.5)	5.7 (42.3)	−0.4 (31.3)	−7.9 (17.8)	4.0 (39.2)
Mean daily minimum °C (°F)	−16.4 (2.5)	−14.1 (6.6)	−9.3 (15.3)	−1.5 (29.3)	4.7 (40.5)	9.6 (49.3)	12.2 (54.0)	11.4 (52.5)	7.4 (45.3)	1.3 (34.3)	−4.2 (24.4)	−12.1 (10.2)	−0.9 (30.4)
Record low °C (°F)	−37 (−35)	−33.3 (−27.9)	−33 (−27)	−17.8 (0.0)	−10.6 (12.9)	−3.2 (26.2)	0 (32)	−1.7 (28.9)	−6 (21)	−12.8 (9.0)	−25.5 (−13.9)	−44 (−47)	−44 (−47)
Average precipitation mm (inches)	110.8 (4.36)	90.5 (3.56)	90.2 (3.55)	93.5 (3.68)	111.8 (4.40)	140 (5.5)	138.1 (5.44)	134.9 (5.31)	104.8 (4.13)	128.2 (5.05)	108.0 (4.25)	120.1 (4.73)	1,370.9 (53.97)
Source: Environment Canada

== Attractions ==
A local attraction of interest is Magnetic Hill (Côte Magnétique), a gravity hill.

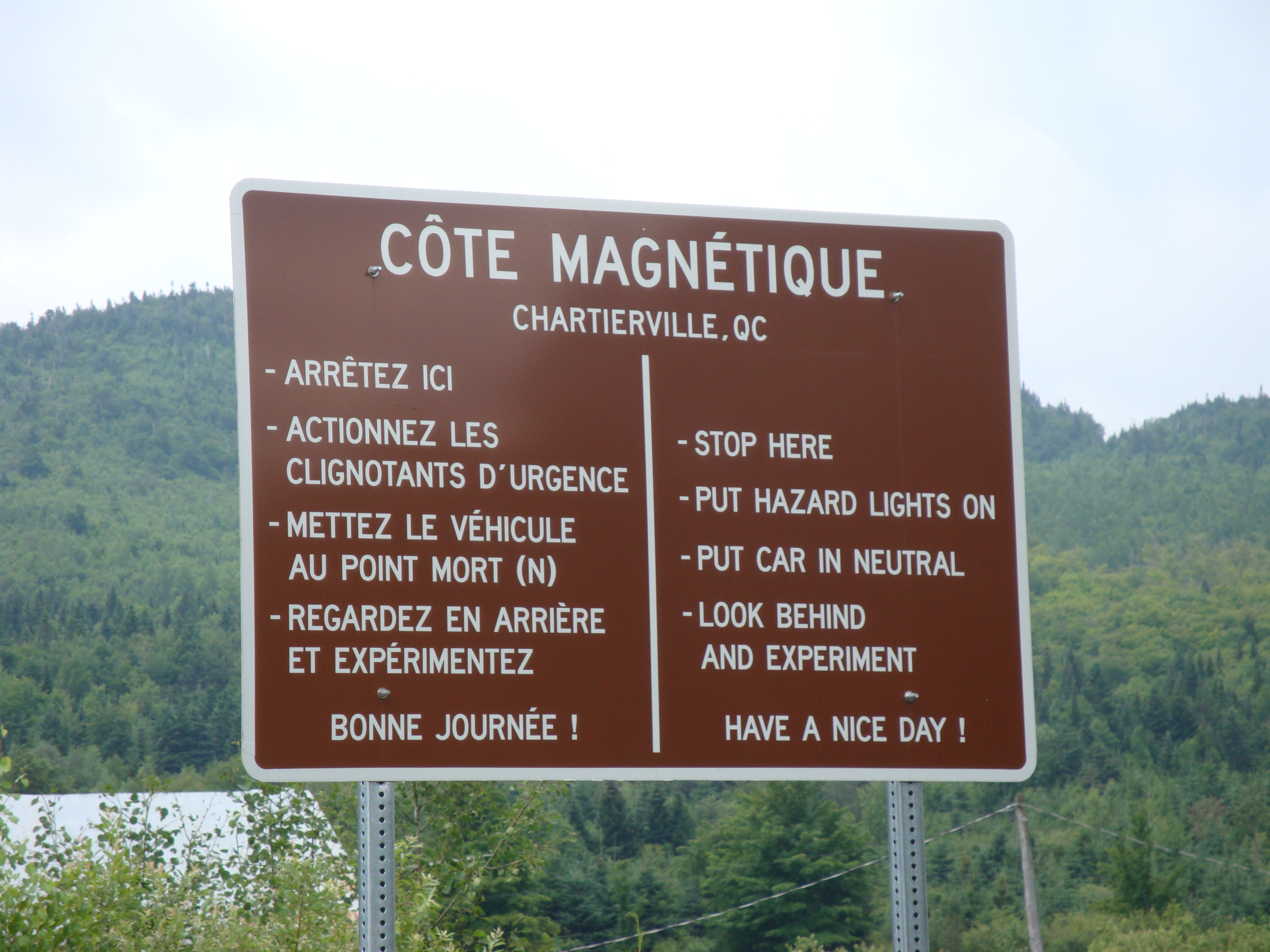
Magnetic Hill in Chartierville at 45.26394°N 71.20564°W
