= List of mayors of Sherbrooke =

Mayor of Sherbrooke
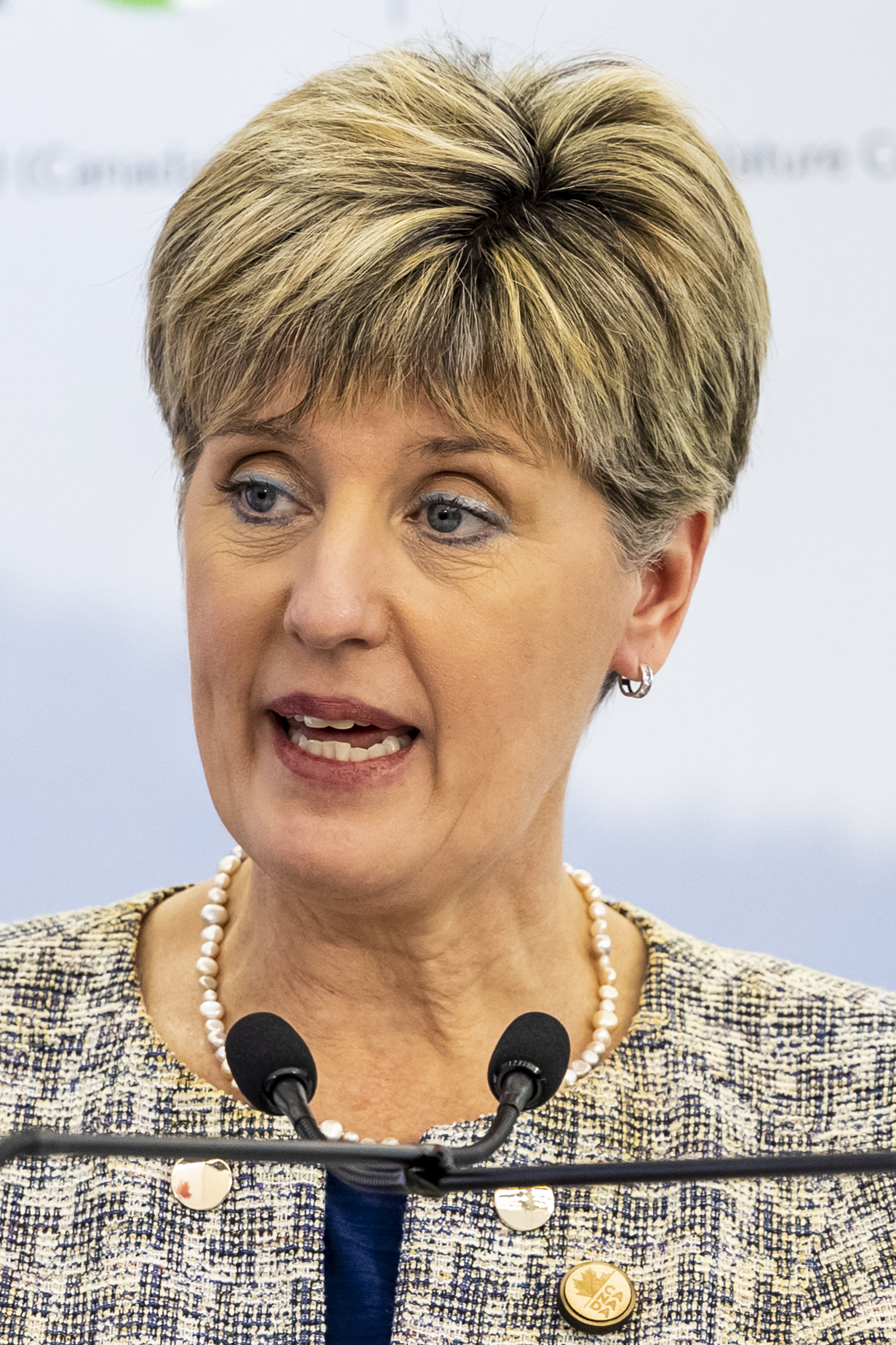
- Incumbent; Marie-Claude Bibeau since November 12, 2025
- Term length: 4 years
- Formation: 1852
- First holder: George Frederick Bowen

This is a list of mayors of Sherbrooke, Quebec.

- 1852–1853 : George Frederick Bowen
- 1854–1855: Joseph Gibb Robertson
- 1855–1857: Albert Phelps Ball
- 1858–1868: Joseph Gibb Robertson
- 1868–1869: Richard William Heneker
- 1869–1872: Joseph Gibb Robertson
- 1873–1875: Richard Dalby Morkill
- 1875–1876: John Griffith
- 1876–1877: Eleazar Clark
- 1877: Richard William Heneker
- 1877–1878: Eleazar Clark
- 1878–1879: William Bullock Ives
- 1880–1881: Hubert-Charron Cabana
- 1881–1882: John Griffith
- 1882–1883: James William Wigget
- 1883–1885: Alexander Galt Lomas
- 1885: Hubert-Charron Cabana
- 1885–1887: William Thomas White
- 1887–1888: William Murray
- 1888–1889: Louis-Edmond Panneton
- 1889–1890: George Gilman Bryant
- 1890–1891: Jérôme-Adolphe Chicoyne
- 1891–1892: Israël Wood
- 1893–1894: Daniel McManamy
- 1894–1895: Gordon Clark
- 1895–1896: Louis-Charles Bélanger
- 1897–1898: Harry Redfern Fraser
- 1898: Stanilas Fortier
- 1899: Harry Redfern Fraser
- 1900: Louis-Charles Bélanger
- 1901: Arthur Norreys Worthington
- 1902: Judes-Olivier Camirand
- 1903: William Farwell
- 1904: Judes-Olivier Camirand
- 1905: John Leonard
- 1906: Charles-Frédéric Olivier
- 1907: William Farwell
- 1908–1909: Léonilde-Charles Bachand
- 1910–1911: Charles-Walter Cate
- 1912–1913: Félix-Herménégilde Hébert
- 1914–1915: James MacKinnon
- 1916–1918: Ernest Sylvestre
- 1918–1920: Charles Dickinson White
- 1920–1922: Donat Oscar Edouard Denault
- 1922–1924: William Morris
- 1924–1926: William Brault
- 1926–1928: James Keith Edwards
- 1928–1930: Joseph-Sylvini Tétreault
- 1930–1932: Albert Carlos Skinner
- 1932–1934: Ludger Forest
- 1934–1936: Frédérick Hamilton Bradley
- 1936–1938: Émile Rioux
- 1938–1940: Marcus Trenholm Armitage
- 1940–1942: Joseph Labrecque
- 1942–1944: Alexander Clark Ross*
- 1944–1946: Joseph-Wencelas Genest*
- 1946–1948: James Guy Dixon Bryant
- 1948–1950: Alphonse Trudeau
- 1950–1952: Charles Benjamin Howard
- 1952–1955: J. Émile Levesque
- 1955–1970: Armand Nadeau
- 1970–1974: Marc Bureau
- 1974–1982: Jacques O'Bready
- 1982–1990: Jean-Paul Pelletier
- 1990–1994: Paul Gervais
- 1994–2009: Jean Perrault
- 2009–2017: Bernard Sévigny
- 2017–2021: Steve Lussier
- 2021–2025: Évelyne Beaudin
- 2025–present: Marie-Claude Bibeau

In the March 24, 1944 Sherbrooke Daily Record, was a photo of outgoing Mayor Ross greeting incoming Mayor Genest. The caption reads in part, 'Sherbrooke followed its traditional custom of electing alternate English and French speaking mayors when Alderman Genest was accorded an acclamation as successor to retiring Mayor A.C. Ross.'
