= Heneker =

Heneker is a surname of Irish origin. It can refer to:

- David Heneker (1906–2001), British musician, composer and lyricist
- Richard William Heneker (1823–1912), Irish immigrant established in Sherbrooke, Quebec, where he became a businessman and a leader in the Cantons- from the east
- Sir William Heneker (William Charles Giffard Heneker) (1867–1939), a Canadian soldier who served with the British Army during the First World War
- Dorothy Heneker (1886–1968), Canadian lawyer and feminist
