= Évelyne Beaudin =

Canadian politician

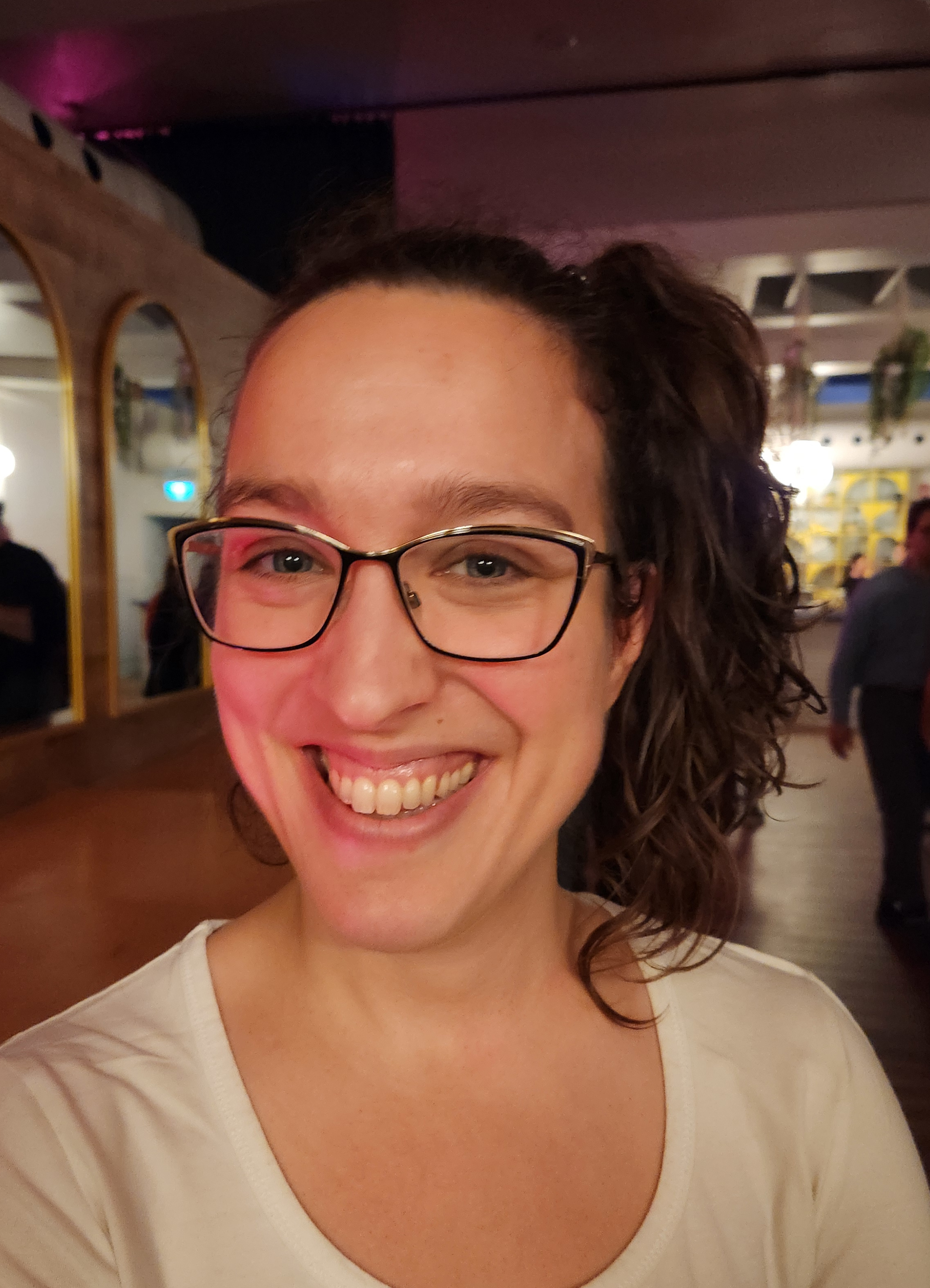

Mayor of Sherbrooke
- In office November 17, 2021 – November 12, 2025
- Preceded by: Steve Lussier
- Succeeded by: Marie-Claude Bibeau

Sherbrooke City Councillor
- In office November 2017 – November 2021
- Preceded by: Pierre Tardif
- Succeeded by: Fernanda Luz
- Constituency: Carrefour District

Leader of Sherbrooke citoyen
- In office October 2018 – November 3, 2024
- Preceded by: Hélène Pigot
- Succeeded by: Raïs Kibonge

Personal details
- Born: 20 June 1988 Rouyn-Noranda, Quebec
- Party: Option nationale Sherbrooke citoyen
- Occupation: Economist

Évelyne Beaudin (French pronunciation: [evlin bodɛ̃]; born 1988 or 1989) is a Canadian politician. She served as mayor of Sherbrooke, Quebec, from 2021 to 2025. With her election, she became the first woman to be elected mayor of the city.

== Biography ==
Beaudin was born in Rouyn-Noranda, Quebec, in 1988 or 1989. A few months after her birth, her family moved to Sherbrooke. Beaudin is an economist by training. She has a bachelor's degree in integrated economics and politics from Laval University and was a master's student in economics at the University of Sherbrooke.

=== Political career ===
In 2011, Beaudin was one of the founders of Option nationale, a centre-left nationalist political party in Quebec. She first ran for office as a candidate for Option nationale in the 2012 Quebec general election in the riding of Sherbrooke. She came in fifth place, winning just over 1000 votes, or 2.8% of the vote. The following year, she first ran for municipal office in the 2013 municipal elections, as an independent candidate for Sherbrooke City Council in the Carrefour District in the city's west end. In the election, she finished second behind the incumbent councillor, Pierre Tardif. She won 969 votes, just over 200 votes behind Tardif. She ran again for Option nationale in the 2014 Quebec general election, this time in the nearby riding of Mégantic. She once again placed in fifth place, with just 236 votes, worth 0.9% of the vote.

In 2016, she founded the Sherbrooke citoyen municipal political party. The same year she became a member "Collectif pour l'équité toponymique au Québec" (Collective for toponymic equity in Quebec), a group which advocates for better female representation in place names in the province. She ran again for city council in the 2017 municipal elections in Carrefour District for her new Sherbrooke citoyen party. This time, she was successful, winning 2,042 votes, defeating Tardif by nearly 200 votes. She was the only member of her party to be elected to council. The following year, she replaced Hélène Pigot to become leader of Sherbrooke citoyen.

In March 2021, she announced she was running for mayor of Sherbrooke in the 2021 municipal elections. Her campaign focused on better financial management and protecting the environment, and made public transit one of her priorities. In the election, she defeated former Quebec cabinet minister and Liberal MNA for Sherbrooke Luc Fortin and incumbent mayor Steve Lussier. She defeated Fortin by just under 1,000 votes, winning 41% of the vote.

==== Mayoralty ====
In June 2023, her administration oversaw a new urban plan to modernize the city's land-use planning vision, replacing the 2014 plan, aimed at protecting 45% of the city's territory.

In August 2023, asked that the Quebec government accelerate the construction of new housing in the city.

In October 2023, Beaudin announced a leave of absence due to exhaustion, citing the intense pressure of her municipal responsibilities. She resumed her duties at the end of January 2024. In an interview, she criticized the lack of progress on major issues, such as the housing crisis and citizen participation, and denounced internal tensions on council, attributing the failure of certain projects to an opposition she considered excessive.

In May 2024, Beaudin announced that she would complete her term and would not run in the 2025 mayoral election. She cited that it was time to inject new energy into her party, by making way for a new leader. She also criticized the Quebec government's lack of support for municipal issues, particularly regarding transportation and funding as reasons for her not running again.

In June 2024, a report by the Commission municipale du Québec (CMQ) highlighted micromanagement and communication problems within her administration. The report highlighted a lack of trust between the executive and civil servants, with procedures that are sometimes ineffective.

In August 2024, she established a team dedicated to public participation and created citizen advisory groups to encourage greater public involvement at city hall. She also introduced a five-year municipal investment plan which included limiting tax increases to 3%.

In February 2025, her administration established an innovation zone dedicated to quantum technologies, attempting to position Sherbrooke as a strategic hub in this field, securing $8 million in federal funding in the process. That same month, the city gained 250 new affordable housing units on Galt Street, and put in place financial reserves to stabilize the city's budget and ensure the maintenance of essential infrastructure.
