= Ludger Forest =

Ludger Forest may refer to:

- Ludger Forest (L'Assomption MLA) (1826–1903), member of the Legislative Assembly of Quebec for L'Assomption electoral district
- Ludger Forest (Sherbrooke MLA) (1877–1943), his nephew, member of the Legislative Assembly of Quebec for Sherbrooke electoral district
