= British American Land Company =

Company formed to encourage immigration to Lower Canada

The British American Land Company
- The British American Land Company's Arms
- Type: Chartered company
- Industry: Land development
- Founded: 1832 (by royal charter)
- Founder: John Galt, Edward Ellice
- Defunct: 1948
- Fate: Dissolved
- Headquarters: Sherbrooke, Quebec
- Area served: Lower Canada
- Services: Land, roads, mills
- Total equity: 1,094,272 acres (4,428.36 km^{2}) of land

The British American Land Company (BALC) was a company formed in 1832 for the purpose of purchasing land and encouraging British immigration to Lower Canada. It was founded and promoted by John Galt, Edward Ellice (Note: who was Lower Canada's largest absentee landowner at the time) and others to acquire and manage the development of almost 1,100,000 acres (1,719 sq mi; 4,452 km^{2}) of Crown land and other lands in the Eastern Townships of Lower Canada, in order to encourage the immigration of British subjects to the region.

In comparison to the Canada Company, a similar enterprise in Upper Canada that thrived through collaboration with the local government, the BALC indulged in land speculation, made immigration a secondary priority, and struggled throughout its existence.

== Origin and formation ==
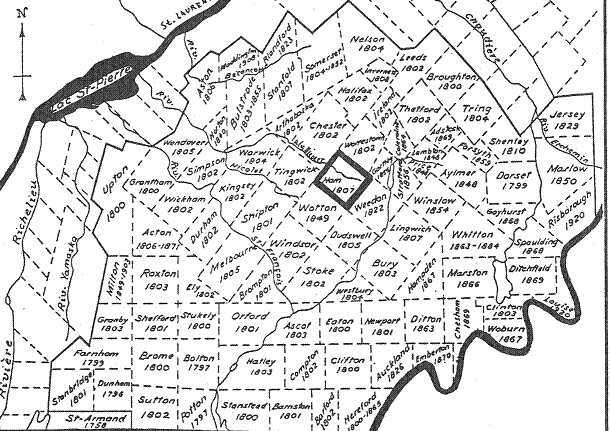
Townships in the Eastern Townships

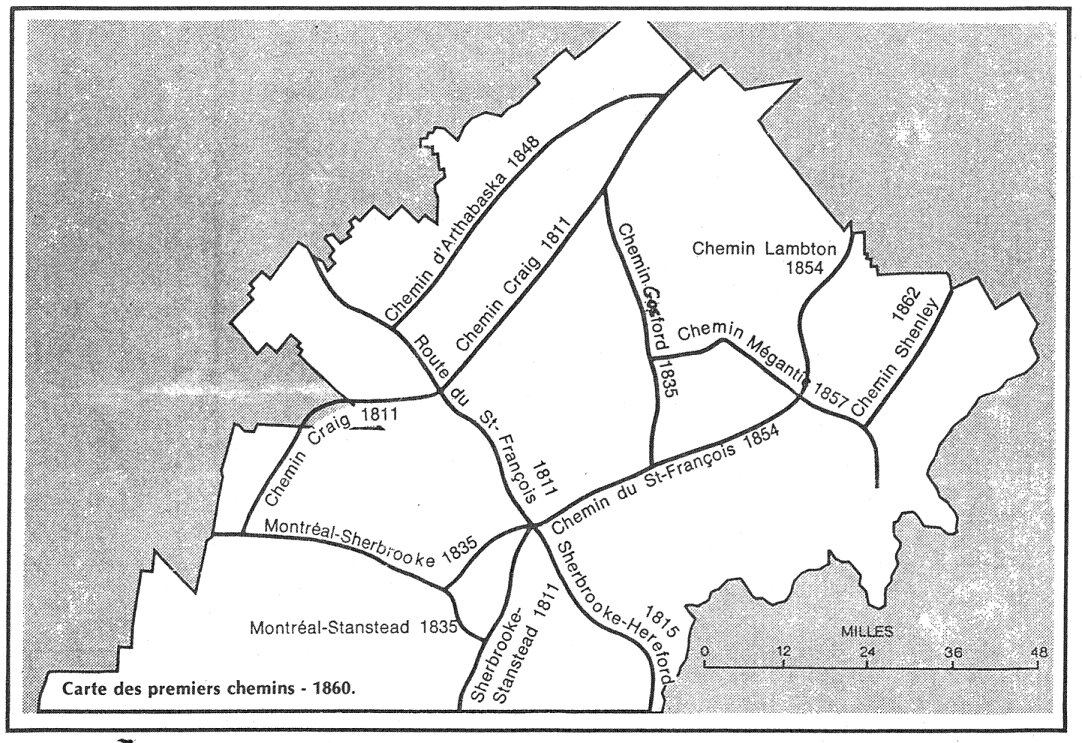
First colonization roads in the Townships

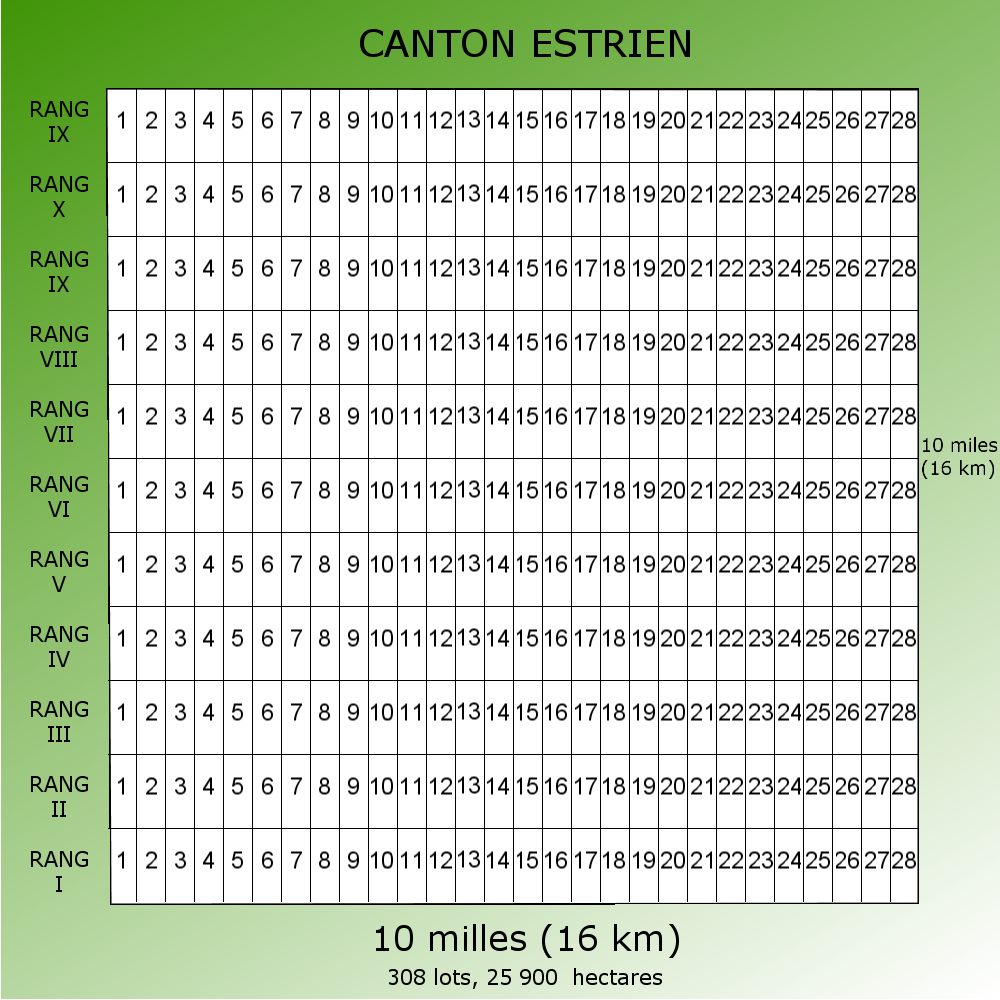
Survey layout for a township

Following the success of the Canada Company in spurring settlement efforts in Upper Canada, similar efforts were initiated to establish a similar company to promote settlement in the Eastern Townships of Lower Canada.

A group of investors in Montreal, headed by Francis Nathaniel Burton, proposed organizing a Lower Canada Land Company, and sent William Bowman Felton to London to promote their venture. While there, he encountered a group with similar objectives. The groups decided to combine together, and, at a meeting in February 1832, decided to proceed with creating the British American Land Company. (Note: at the same meeting, John Galt was named as the Honorary secretary of the Company,)

British American Land Company Act 1834
- Act of Parliament
- Parliament of the United Kingdom
- Long title: An Act for granting certain Powers to "The British American Land Company."
- Citation: 4 & 5 Will. 4. c. xv

Dates
- Royal assent: 22 May 1834

Text of statute as originally enacted

British American Land Company Act 1847
- Act of Parliament
- Parliament of the United Kingdom
- Long title: An Act for amending an Act passed in the fourth year of the reign of his late Majesty King William the Fourth, intituled, "An Act for granting certain Powers to the British American Land Company," and for granting further Powers to the said Company.
- Citation: 10 & 11 Vict. c. lvi

Dates
- Royal assent: 25 June 1847

Text of statute as originally enacted

British American Land Company's Act 1871
- Act of Parliament
- Parliament of the United Kingdom
- Long title: An Act for granting further powers to the British American Land Company.
- Citation: 34 & 35 Vict. c. clxxi

Dates
- Royal assent: 24 July 1871

Text of statute as originally enacted

British American Land Company's Act 1883
- Act of Parliament
- Parliament of the United Kingdom
- Long title: An Act for granting further Powers to the British American Land Company.
- Citation: 46 & 47 Vict. c. iv

Dates
- Royal assent: 26 April 1883

British American Land Company's Act 1894
- Act of Parliament
- Parliament of the United Kingdom
- Long title: An Act for granting further powers to the British American Land Company.
- Citation: 57 & 58 Vict. c. xv

Dates
- Royal assent: 1 June 1894

Text of statute as originally enacted

It was incorporated by royal charter in March 1834, and secured a local act from the Parliament of the United Kingdom, (Note: An Act for granting certain powers to the British American Land Company, 1834, c. xv (later supplemented by An Act to facilitate the proof of the Charter and Act of Incorporation of the British American Land Company, S.Prov.C. 1847, c. 107 ); later amended by 1847 c. lvi, 1871 c. clxxi, 1883 c. iv, and 1894 c. xv) enabling it to:

1. operate directly in any of the provinces and colonies in British North America by virtue of the royal charter, and appoint commissioners and agents for the purpose of purchasing and disposing of land therein;
2. where any seigniorial lands are acquired by the company (whether held à titre de fief et seigneurie, à titre de fief en arrière-fief, or à titre de cens), commute all feudal and seigniorial rights, so that such lands will be held in free and common socage (and any Crown lands acquired by the company would have the same status); and
3. hire indentured servants, for periods of time not to exceed seven years, for service in British North America.

== Commissioners ==
The following Commissioners were appointed during the existence of BALC:

1. Peter McGill and George Moffatt (acting jointly) (1834-1835)
2. Arthur C. Webster (1835-1837)
3. John Fraser (1837-1844)
4. Alexander Tilloch Galt (1844-1855)
5. Richard William Heneker (1856-1902) (Note: in addition to his role as Commissioner (in which he had an activist role in investing the Company's assets in industrial development), Heneker was also Mayor of Sherbrooke for a time, Chairman of the Eastern Townships Bank and other industrial concerns, as well as having a close link for many years with Bishop's College)
6. James Davidson (1903-)
7. George Cate

== Land holdings and later interests ==
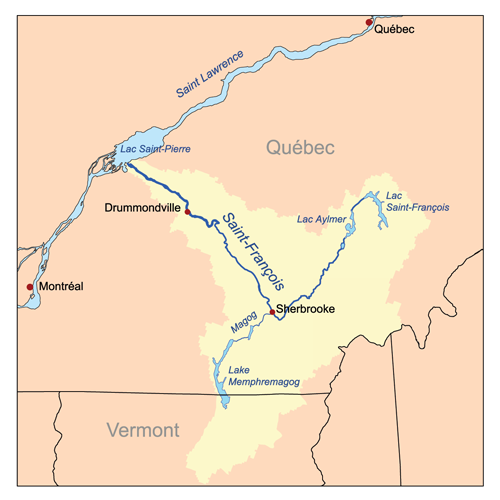
Basin of the Saint-François River

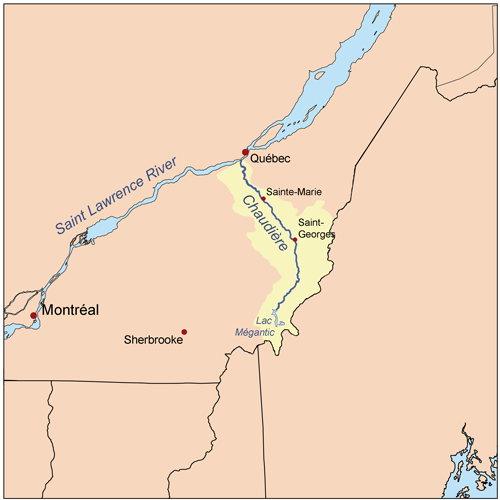
Basin of the Chaudière River

The lands of the British American Land Company were chiefly concentrated between the upper Saint-François, Lake Mégantic on the Chaudière, and the International Boundary

=== Initial activities ===
In December 1833, it was announced that an agreement had been reached with Edward Smith-Stanley, Secretary of State for War and the Colonies, to acquire a total of 847,661 acres (1,324 sq mi; 3,430 km^{2}) for a purchase price of £120,000. This consisted of 596,325 acres (932 sq mi; 2,413 km^{2}) of unsurveyed lands in the County of Sherbrooke; (Note: known as the St. Francis Territory, situated between the upper Saint-François River and Lake Mégantic) together with 251,336 acres (393 sq mi; 1,017 km^{2}) in Crown reserves and surveyed Crown lands in the Counties of Sherbrooke, Shefford and Stanstead.

Upon Fraser's appointment in 1835, the Company's activities began in earnest, being concentrated in three places:

1. Sherbrooke, as the Company's headquarters
2. Victoria, in Lingwick Township, (Note: just outside Bury Township, near the present community of Scotstown) as the centre of settlement activities (Note: Victoria would shortly be abandoned, thus becoming a ghost town)
3. Port St. Francis, at the foot of Lake Saint Pierre, (Note: 46°16′6″N 72°37′18″W; now part of Nicolet) as the port of entry for the district (Note: as the result of the construction of better roads into the district, development of the port was later abandoned)

BALC would later acquire additional lands through public auctions and private sales, (Note: notably being able to employ cherry picking in selecting the most valuable land, at a price less than either the upset price or price by auction anywhere in the district) bringing its total holdings up to 1,094,272 acres (1,710 sq mi; 4,428 km^{2}).

=== Colonisation efforts ===
Lands (shaded in red) held by BALC in the Eastern Townships, 1839

Wharves and warehouses were constructed at Port St. Francis, as were grist mills, sawmills and other facilities within the territory. Lands were sold subject to a 20% down payment, with the balance payable in three subsequent annual instalments, and the Company also offered to help clear the land and build a log house upon it for an extra charge. During 1836, during the first year of activity, three hundred families had settled in Victoria, occupying 23,000 acres (35.9 sq mi; 93.1 km^{2}), while 10,000 acres (15.6 sq mi; 40.5 km^{2}) had been sold in other districts.

By deliberately working to increase the English-speaking portion of the population of Lower Canada, it was denounced by the Parti patriote and was referred to in the Ninety-two Resolutions adopted by the Legislative Assembly of Lower Canada in 1834. (Note: one of the supporters of this measure was Marcus Child, the local MLA for Stanstead) It was also denounced during the Lower Canada Rebellion in 1837, where a proclamation issued by Patriote leader Robert Nelson declared that all unsold Company lands "are of right the property of the State of Lower Canada."

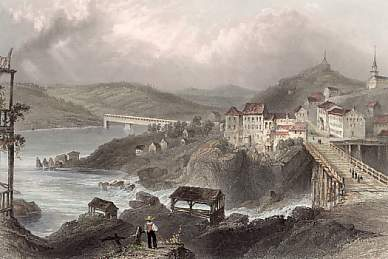
Sherbrooke, where the Saint-François and Magog Rivers meet (1839). The British American Land Company would later exploit the waterpower arising from its water rights to promote the town's industrial development.

The expenses incurred to open up the lands were high in relation to the revenues earned from their subsequent disposition. The 1837 Rebellion discouraged immigration to Lower Canada, frightening off the better class of potential immigrants, (Note: in 1841, only 400 of the 28,000 emigrants landing at Quebec would go to the Eastern Townships, and less than 1,500 acres (2.3 sq mi; 6.1 km^{2}) were sold) and many of the current settlers were defaulting on their payments or even abandoning their lands. Many of the local agents were also neglecting their duties or pilfering the company stores, and the Company resisted attempts by local councils to impose property taxes on its holdings. This would eventually lead to the Company experiencing financial problems in 1841, forcing it to return 511,237 acres (799 sq mi; 2,069 km^{2}) of the St. Francis tract to the Province of Canada. (Note: into which other colonisation efforts would be undertaken)

In 1843, the Company began focus its efforts on selling land to the local French-Canadian population, (Note: in Compton County, this would lead to the anglophone and francophone populations becoming approximately equal by the end of the 19th Century) disposing it on new terms, consisting of no down payment, interest payments only for the first ten years, with the principal then being payable in four equal annual instalments. In the beginning, such obligations could be settled by payment in kind.

In 1858, the Company returned a further 292,729 acres (457 sq mi; 1,185 km^{2}) to the Province, in consideration for certain sums due to the Crown.

=== Exploitation of natural resources and manufacturing ===
The Company's finances would subsequently improve, and its earnings would be invested in other industrial concerns, including railroads, (Note: The St. Lawrence and Atlantic Railroad, in which Galt and the Company respectively invested $30,000 and $96,000 in shares. The enterprise was seen by Galt as being beneficial to developing the remainder of the Company's estates, as well as other parts of the Townships.) mining (Note: the British American Exploring and Mining Association) and Sherbrooke's textile mills, (Note: including the Sherbrooke Cotton Factory, the first joint-stock industrial company to be incorporated in Canada, in which Galt arranged for the Company's support in rescuing it from the verge of bankruptcy in 1847, and the Sherbrooke Manufacturing Company) and it would operate other industrial enterprises itself. (Note: Galt managed a large sawmill as well as a factory for making pails) It would also get into the business of lending money, and, in 1876, the law governing interest was modified with respect to the loans made by the Company, so that it could charge an annual rate up to 8%, in place of the then legal maximum of 6%.

It would also begin to sell landholdings in large blocks for their value as timber. In 1872, it sold 99,833 acres (156 sq mi; 404 km^{2}) to Cyrus Sullivan Clark of Bangor, Maine, who purchased a further 7,901 acres (12 sq mi; 32 km^{2}) from the company in the following year. These holdings were approximately half the size of the Crown timber limits that he already possessed. (Note: During the Long Depression of the 1870s, Clark would lose these lands as a consequence of a default on the mortgage on his properties, but would be able to repurchase 42,745 acres (67 sq mi; 173 km^{2}) from the Eastern Townships Bank by 1879-80. He would enter into partnership with John Henry Pope to form the Brompton Mills Lumber Company, which would later, after several subsequent owners, be acquired by Kruger Inc.)

=== Later years ===
By 1910, it had sold the greater part of its holdings, but continued to operate until its dissolution in 1948. Most of the Company's records appear to have since been carelessly destroyed.

== Notable shareholders ==
Shareholders in the company included:

- Boyd Alexander
- James Whatman Bosanquet
- George Fife Angas
- Russell Ellice
- Pascoe St Leger Grenfell
- Claudius Stephen Hunter
- Patrick Maxwell Stewart

== Coat of arms ==
Coat of arms of British American Land Company
Crest A plough proper in front of a garb Or Escutcheon Argent on a saltire Azure between in chief an oak tree eradicated, in fess two bee hives and in base a ship under sail all proper, a cornucopia Or, on a chief Ermine a lion passant guardant Or between a thistle proper and a harp Or Supporters Dexter a woodman holding an axe sinister a reaper holding a sickle proper Motto Neu segnes jaceant terrae ("Do not let even poor and infertile grounds lie neglected")

== Notes and references ==
=== Bibliography ===
History

- Day, Catherine Matilda (1869). History of the Eastern Townships. Montreal: John Lovell.
- Channell, Leonard Stewart (1896). History of Compton County, and Sketches of the Eastern Townships, District of St. Francis, and Sherbrooke County. Cookshire: L.S. Channell.
- Myers, Gustavus (1914). History of Canadian Wealth. Chicago: Charles H. Kerr & Co.
- Fournier, Marcel (2012). La colonie nantaise de Lac-Mégantic : Une implantation française au Québec au XIXe siècle [The colony from Nantes at Lake Megantic: A French settlement in 19th Century Quebec] (in French). Montreal: Éditions du Septentrion. ISBN 978-2-89448-692-4.

Academic works

- Smith, Charles David (1976). Land, Colonization and Development in Quebec, 1800-1850: The Role of Land Alienation, Colonization and the British American Land Company on Quebec's Development, 1800-1850 (PDF) (MA). McGill University.
- Little, John Irvine (1977). The Peaceable Conquest: French Canadian Colonization in the Eastern Townships during the Nineteenth Century (PDF) (PhD). University of Ottawa.
- Little, John Irvine (1981). "Colonization and Municipal Reform in Canada East". Histoire Sociale - Social History. 14 (27): 93–121.
- Little, John Irvine (1989). Ethno-Cultural Transition and Regional Identity in the Eastern Townships of Quebec (PDF). Canada's Ethnic Groups. Ottawa: Canadian Historical Society. ISBN 0-88798-116-X. ISSN 1715-8605. Archived from the original (PDF) on 1 June 2017.
- Little, John Irvine (1989). Nationalism, Capitalism, and Colonization in Nineteenth-Century Quebec: The Upper St Francis District. McGill-Queen's University Press. ISBN 0-7735-0699-3.

Biography

- Skelton, Oscar Douglas (1920). The Life and Times of Sir Alexander Tilloch Galt. Toronto: Oxford University Press.
- Kesteman, Jean-Pierre (1990). "Galt, Sir Alexander Tilloch". In Halpenny, Francess G. (ed.). Dictionary of Canadian Biography. Vol. XII (1891–1900) (online ed.). University of Toronto Press.
- Rudin, Ronald (1998). "Heneker, Richard William". In Cook, Ramsay; Hamelin, Jean (eds.). Dictionary of Canadian Biography. Vol. XIV (1911–1920) (online ed.). University of Toronto Press.
