= President of the National Assembly of Quebec =

Canadian provincial legislative officer

The president of the National Assembly of Quebec (French; Président de l'Assemblée nationale du Québec) is the presiding officer of the National Assembly of Quebec, Canada, which is modeled after the Westminster parliamentary system. In other Anglophone parliaments and legislatures the equivalent position is often called the "Speaker", which is why from 1867 to 1968, the presiding officer of the Assembly was known in French as "orateur," a translation of the English term "speaker".

== Description ==
The president of the National Assembly is fifth in the Quebec order of precedence, after the king of Canada, the lieutenant governor of Quebec, the premier, and the deputy premier. The National Assembly elects the president at the beginning of a legislature, for the length of the legislature. The president is assisted by the vice presidents of the Assembly, who serve in the absence of the president. Parti Québécois Member of the National Assembly (MNA) Louise Harel made history by being appointed as the first female president on March 12, 2002. The current president of the Assembly is the CAQ MNA Nathalie Roy. Roy is the second woman to serve in the role after Harel herself.

== Roles ==
The function of the president holds three major roles.

- Presiding over Assembly hearings.
- Administration of Assembly services.
- Representing the Assembly, notably in relations with other parliaments.

== List of presidents of the National Assembly of Quebec ==
No.	Portrait	Name Electoral district (Birth–Death)	Term of office		Party	Legislature
No.	Portrait	Name Electoral district (Birth–Death)	Term start	Term end	Party	Legislature
1		Joseph-Goderic Blanchet; MLA for Lévis (1829–1890)	December 27, 1867	June 7, 1875	Conservative	1st
1		Joseph-Goderic Blanchet; MLA for Lévis (1829–1890)	December 27, 1867	June 7, 1875	Conservative	2nd
2		Pierre-Étienne Fortin; MLA for Gaspé (1823–1888)	November 4, 1875	November 9, 1876	Conservative	3rd
3		Louis Beaubien; MLA for Hochelaga (1837–1915)	November 10, 1876	May 1, 1878	Conservative	3rd
4		Arthur Turcotte; MLA for Trois-Rivières (1845–1905)	June 4, 1878	March 8, 1882	Independent Conservative	4th
5		Louis-Olivier Taillon; MLA for Montréal-Est (1840–1923)	March 8, 1882	January 23, 1884	Conservative	5th
6		Jonathan Saxton Campbell Würtele; MLA for Yamaska (1828–1904)	March 27, 1884	June 28, 1886	Conservative	6th
7		Félix-Gabriel Marchand; MLA for Saint-Jean (1832–1900)	January 27, 1887	April 26, 1892	Liberal	6th
7		Félix-Gabriel Marchand; MLA for Saint-Jean (1832–1900)	January 27, 1887	April 26, 1892	Liberal	7th
8		Pierre-Évariste Leblanc; MLA for Laval (1853–1918)	April 26, 1892	November 23, 1897	Conservative	8th
9		Jules Tessier; MLA for Portneuf (1852–1934)	November 23, 1897	February 14, 1901	Liberal	9th
10		Henri-Benjamin Rainville; MLA for Montréal division no. 3 (1852–1937)	February 14, 1901	March 2, 1905	Liberal	10th
11		Auguste Tessier; MLA for Rimouski (1853–1938)	March 2, 1905	March 23, 1905	Liberal	11th
12		William Alexander Weir; MLA for Argenteuil (1858–1929)	April 25, 1905	August 31, 1906	Liberal	11th
13		Philippe-Honoré Roy; MLA for St. Jean (1847–1910)	January 15, 1907	June 8, 1908	Liberal	11th
14		Jean-Marie-Joseph-Pantaléon Pelletier; MLA for Sherbrooke (1860–1924)	March 2, 1909	August 7, 1911	Liberal	12th
15		Cyrille-Fraser Delâge; MLA for Québec-Comté (1869–1957)	January 9, 1912	November 7, 1916	Liberal	12th
15		Cyrille-Fraser Delâge; MLA for Québec-Comté (1869–1957)	January 9, 1912	November 7, 1916	Liberal	13th
16		Antonin Galipeault; MLA for Bellechasse (1879–1971)	November 7, 1916	August 25, 1919	Liberal	14th
17		Joseph-Napoléon Francoeur; MLA for Lotbinière (1880–1965)	December 10, 1919	January 10, 1928	Liberal	15th
17		Joseph-Napoléon Francoeur; MLA for Lotbinière (1880–1965)	December 10, 1919	January 10, 1928	Liberal	16th
18		Hector Laferté; MLA for Drummond (1885–1971)	January 10, 1928	April 24, 1929	Liberal	17th
19		Télesphore-Damien Bouchard; MLA for Saint-Hyacinthe (1881–1962)	January 7, 1930	June 6, 1935	Liberal	17th
19		Télesphore-Damien Bouchard; MLA for Saint-Hyacinthe (1881–1962)	January 7, 1930	June 6, 1935	Liberal	18th
20		Lucien Dugas; MLA for Joliette (1897–1985)	March 24, 1936	October 7, 1936	Liberal	19th
21		Paul Sauvé; MLA for Deux-Montagnes (1907–1960)	October 7, 1936	February 19, 1940	Union Nationale	20th
22		Bernard Bissonnette; MLA for L'Assomption (1898–1964)	February 20, 1940	May 8, 1942	Liberal	21st
23		Valmore Bienvenue; MLA for Bellechasse (1894–1952)	May 12, 1942	November 5, 1942	Liberal	21st
24		Cyrille Dumaine; MLA for Bagot (1897–1946)	February 23, 1943	February 7, 1945	Liberal	21st
25		Alexandre Taché; MLA for Hull (1899–1961)	February 7, 1945	December 15, 1955	Union Nationale	22nd
25		Alexandre Taché; MLA for Hull (1899–1961)	February 7, 1945	December 15, 1955	Union Nationale	23rd
25		Alexandre Taché; MLA for Hull (1899–1961)	February 7, 1945	December 15, 1955	Union Nationale	24th
26		Maurice Tellier; MLA for Montcalm (1896–1966)	December 15, 1955	September 20, 1960	Union Nationale	24th
26		Maurice Tellier; MLA for Montcalm (1896–1966)	December 15, 1955	September 20, 1960	Union Nationale	25th
27		Lucien Cliche; MLA for Abitibi-Est (1916–2005)	September 20, 1960	December 15, 1961	Liberal	26th
28		John Richard Hyde; MLA for Westmount–Saint-Georges (1912–2003)	January 9, 1962	October 14, 1965	Liberal	26th
28		John Richard Hyde; MLA for Westmount–Saint-Georges (1912–2003)	January 9, 1962	October 14, 1965	Liberal	27th
29		Guy Lechasseur; MLA for Verchères (1916–2005)	October 22, 1965	December 1, 1966	Liberal	27th
30		Rémi Paul; MLA for Maskinongé (1921–1982)	December 1, 1966	October 21, 1968	Union Nationale	28th
31		Gérard Lebel; MNA for Rivière-du-Loup (1930–2020)	January 1, 1969	December 23, 1969	Union Nationale	28th
32		Raynald Fréchette; MNA for Sherbrooke (1933–2007)	February 24, 1970	June 8, 1970	Union Nationale	28th
33		Jean-Noël Lavoie; MNA for Laval (1927–2013)	June 8, 1970	December 14, 1976	Liberal	29th
33		Jean-Noël Lavoie; MNA for Laval (1927–2013)	June 8, 1970	December 14, 1976	Liberal	30th
34		Clément Richard; MNA for Montmorency (1939–2022)	December 14, 1976	November 6, 1980	Parti Québécois	31st
35		Claude Vaillancourt; MNA for Jonquière (born 1944)	November 11, 1980	March 23, 1983	Parti Québécois	31st
35		Claude Vaillancourt; MNA for Jonquière (born 1944)	November 11, 1980	March 23, 1983	Parti Québécois	32nd
36		Richard Guay; MNA for Taschereau (born 1943)	March 23, 1983	December 16, 1985	Parti Québécois	32nd
37		Pierre Lorrain; MNA for Saint-Jean (1942–2004)	December 16, 1985	November 28, 1989	Liberal	33rd
38		Jean-Pierre Saintonge; MNA for La Pinière (born 1945)	November 28, 1989	November 29, 1994	Liberal	34th
39		Roger Bertrand; MNA for Portneuf (born 1947)	November 29, 1994	January 29, 1996	Parti Québécois	35th
40		Jean-Pierre Charbonneau; MNA for Borduas (born 1950)	March 12, 1996	March 12, 2002	Parti Québécois	35th
40		Jean-Pierre Charbonneau; MNA for Borduas (born 1950)	March 12, 1996	March 12, 2002	Parti Québécois	36th
41		Louise Harel; MNA for Hochelaga-Maisonneuve (born 1946)	March 12, 2002	June 4, 2003	Parti Québécois	36th
42		Michel Bissonnet; MNA for Jeanne-Mance–Viger (born 1942)	June 4, 2003	July 14, 2008	Liberal	37th
42		Michel Bissonnet; MNA for Jeanne-Mance–Viger (born 1942)	June 4, 2003	July 14, 2008	Liberal	38th
43		François Gendron; MNA for Abitibi-Ouest (born 1944)	October 21, 2008	January 12, 2009	Parti Québécois	38th
44		Yvon Vallières; MNA for Richmond (born 1949)	January 13, 2009	April 5, 2011	Liberal	39th
45		Jacques Chagnon; MNA for Westmount–Saint-Louis (born 1952)	April 5, 2011	November 26, 2018	Liberal	39th
45		Jacques Chagnon; MNA for Westmount–Saint-Louis (born 1952)	April 5, 2011	November 26, 2018	Liberal	40th
45		Jacques Chagnon; MNA for Westmount–Saint-Louis (born 1952)	April 5, 2011	November 26, 2018	Liberal	41st
46		François Paradis; MNA for Lévis (born 1957)	November 26, 2018	November 28, 2022	Coalition Avenir Québec	42nd
47		Nathalie Roy; MNA for Montarville (born 1964)	November 29, 2022	October 5, 2026	Coalition Avenir Québec	43rd

All but one speaker was born in the province (Valmore Bienvenue was born in the United States to Québécois parents). Henri-Benjamin Rainville died in the US and Cyrille Dumaine died in Ottawa.
