= Margaret Robertson =

Margaret Robertson may refer to:

- Margaret Hills (1882–1967), née Robertson, British teacher, suffragist organiser, feminist and socialist
- Margaret Murray Robertson (1823–1897), Scottish-Canadian teacher and writer
