= Morkill =

Morkill may refer to:

- Morkill River, British Columbia, Canada
- Mount Morkill, Alberta and British Columbia, Canada
- Richard Dalby Morkill (fl. 1873–1875), mayor of Sherbrooke, Quebec, Canada
