= Andrew Robertson (disambiguation) =

Andy Robertson (born 1994) is a Scottish footballer.

Andrew or Andy Robertson may also refer to:

- Andrew Robertson (actor) (born 1941), British actor
- Andrew Robertson (doctor), Australian public health doctor
- Andrew Robertson (sprinter) (born 1990), British sprinter
- Andrew Robertson (businessman) (1827–1890), Canadian businessman and chairman of the Montreal Harbour Commission
- Andrew Robertson (engineer) (1883–1977), British mechanical engineer
- Andrew Robertson (lawyer) (1815–1880), Canadian lawyer, author of legal works
- Andrew Robertson (miniaturist) (1777–1845), Scottish miniaturist portrait painter
- Andrew Robertson (politician) (1865–1934), Australian politician
- Andrew N. Robertson (born 1974), British actor
- Andy W. Robertson, editor of William Hope Hodgson's Night Lands
