= 2025 Sherbrooke municipal election =

Election in Quebec, Canada

- Mayoral election
← 2021	November 2, 2025	2029 →
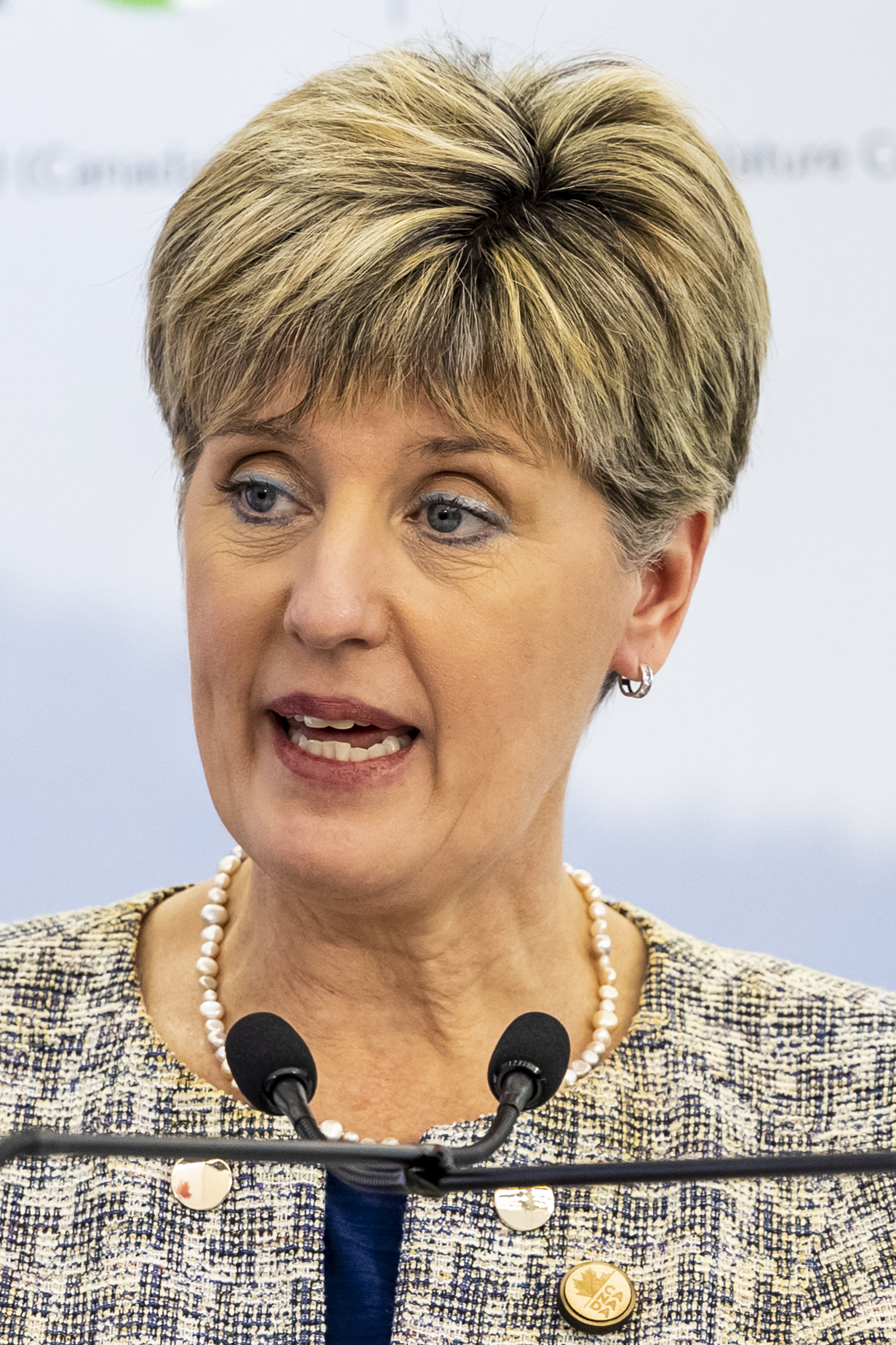
		VB
Nominee	Marie-Claude Bibeau	Vincent Boutin
Party	Independent	Independent
Popular vote	27,550	17,531
Percentage	46.45%	29.56%
	VAS	SC
Nominee	Guillaume Brien	Raïs Kibonge
Party	Vision action Sherbrooke	Sherbrooke citoyen
Popular vote	6,754	6,607
Percentage	11.39	11.14
Mayor before election
Évelyne Beaudin
Sherbrooke citoyen
Elected mayor
Marie-Claude Bibeau
Independent
- City Council election
← 2021	November 2, 2025	2029 →
- 16 seats in Sherbrooke City Council; 9 seats needed for a majority
Party	Leader	Vote %	Seats	+/–
Independent	–		10	+2
SC	Raïs Kibonge		3	−3
VAS	Guillaume Brien		1	+1
This lists parties that won seats. See the complete results below.

The 2025 Sherbrooke municipal election took place on November 2, 2025, to elect a mayor and city councillors in Sherbrooke, Quebec, Canada. The election was held in conjunction with municipal elections held across Quebec on that date.

== City council ==
=== Brompton–Rock Forest–Saint-Élie–Deauville Borough ===
==== District du Lac Magog ====
Party	Candidate	Vote	%
Sherbrooke Citoyen	Anthony Charbonneau	747	15.52
Vision action Sherbrooke	Annie Faucher (X)	2,578	53.56
Independent	Marie Page	478	9.93
Independent	Germain Thibault	893	18.55

==== District de Rock Forest ====
Party	Candidate	Vote	%
Sherbrooke Citoyen	Léona Nkoghe	276	5.14
Vision action Sherbrooke	Marie-Claude Garneau	1,013	18.87
Independent	Tirad Badawi	204	3.80
Independent	Steve Bourassa	1,157	21.55
Independent	François-Olivier Desmarais (X)	2,633	49.04

==== District de Saint-Élie ====
Party	Candidate	Vote	%
Sherbrooke Citoyen	Julien Moslener	440	9.22
Vision action Sherbrooke	Nadie Côté	679	14.22
Independent	Christelle Lefèvre (X)	3,577	74.93

==== District de Brompton ====
Party	Candidate	Vote	%
Sherbrooke Citoyen	Catherine Boileau (X)	1,073	39.10
Vision action Sherbrooke	Claudia Guay	630	22.96
Independent	Sébastien Houle	1,004	36.59

=== Fleurimont Borough ===
==== District de l'Hôtel-Dieu ====
Party	Candidate	Vote	%
Sherbrooke Citoyen	Laure Letarte-Lavoie (X)	1,746	46.57
Vision action Sherbrooke	Linda Pagé	1,403	37.42
Independent	Hubert Richard	464	12.38

==== District de Desranleau ====
Party	Candidate	Vote	%
Sherbrooke Citoyen	Amine Hamdache	354	7.33
Vision action Sherbrooke	Karim Talbot	1,059	21.93
Independent	Danielle Berthold (X)	3,349	69.35

==== District des Quatre-Saisons ====
Party	Candidate	Vote	%
Sherbrooke Citoyen	Pierre-Luc Dusseault	1,250	33.77
Vision action Sherbrooke	Edwin Moreno	482	13.02
Independent	Joanie Bellerose (X)	1,860	50.24

==== District du Pin-Solitaire ====
Party	Candidate	Vote	%
Sherbrooke Citoyen	Sarah Rahimaly	803	25.57
Vision action Sherbrooke	Fabrice Thibault	677	21.55
Independent	Pascale Larocque (X)	1,375	43.78
Independent	Yannick Théroux	204	6.49

=== Lennoxville Borough ===
==== City councillor ====
Party	Candidate	Vote	%
Sherbrooke Citoyen	Kerwins Saint-Jean	232	12.11
Vision action Sherbrooke	André Duncan	223	11.64
Independent	Bert Collins (X)	591	30.85
Independent	Jennifer Garfat	486	25.37
Independent	Steven Pankovitch	351	18.32

==== Borough council ====
===== District d'Uplands =====
Party	Candidate	Vote	%
Sherbrooke Citoyen	Daniela Fernandes	269	23.13
Vision action Sherbrooke	Chantal Turgeon	163	14.02
Independent	Claude Charron (X)	703	60.45

===== District de Fairview =====
Party	Candidate	Vote	%
Sherbrooke Citoyen	Guillaume Lirette-Gélinas	184	24.44
Vision action Sherbrooke	Norman Green	174	23.11
Independent	Frank Gilbert (X)	373	49.54

=== Des Nations Borough ===
==== District de l'Université ====
Party	Candidate	Vote	%
Sherbrooke Citoyen	Judith Rodrigue	968	19.86
Vision action Sherbrooke	Guillaume Desmarais	700	14.36
Independent	Paul Gingues (X)	1,935	39.71
Independent	Benoit Huberdeau	1,165	23.91

==== District d'Ascot ====
Party	Candidate	Vote	%
Sherbrooke Citoyen	Annabelle Lalumière-Ting	898	22.67
Independent	Geneviève La Roche (X)	2,510	63.37
Independent	Agar Grinberg	143	3.61
Independent	Christian Roy	287	7.25

==== District du Lac-des-Nations ====
Party	Candidate	Vote	%
Sherbrooke Citoyen	Julien Fontaine-Binette	1,580	39.64
Vision action Sherbrooke	Jessika Wilson	684	17.16
Independent	Karine Godbout (X)	1,638	41.09

==== District du Golf ====
Party	Candidate	Vote	%
Sherbrooke Citoyen	Josée-Ann Larone	1,085	17.95
Vision action Sherbrooke	Louis Delisle	2,399	39.69
Independent	Pierre Avard (X)	2,432	40.23

==== District du Carrefour ====
Party	Candidate	Vote	%
Sherbrooke Citoyen	Fernanda Luz (X)	1,834	34.11
Vision action Sherbrooke	Louis-Philippe Bérard	1,618	30.09
Independent	Behnan Balparazi	347	6.45
Independent	Diego Zol	1,409	26.20
