= Hubert-Charron Cabana =

Mayor of Sherbrooke
- In office 1885
- Preceded by: Alexander Galt Lomas
- Succeeded by: William Thomas White
- In office 1880–1881
- Preceded by: William Bullock Ives
- Succeeded by: John Griffith

Personal details
- Born: 14 June 1838 Verchères, Lower Canada
- Died: 9 June 1901 (aged 62) Sherbrooke, Quebec
- Occupation: Lawyer; Journalist; Politician; Office holder

Hubert-Charron Cabana (14 June 1838 – 9 June 1901) was a Canadian lawyer, journalist, politician, and office holder.

== Life ==
Born in Verchères, Lower Canada, Cabana was one of the first French-Canadian lawyers in Sherbrooke. He founded the first French-language newspaper in that city, called Le Pionnier de Sherbrooke, and became its first francophone mayor.

He was appointed consulting counsel on 26 June 1883 and elected Bâtonnierof Saint-François district in May 1884.

== Death ==
He died in Sherbrooke on June 9, 1901.
