= Jean-Marie-Joseph-Pantaléon Pelletier =

Canadian politician (1860–1924)

Pantaléon Pelletier
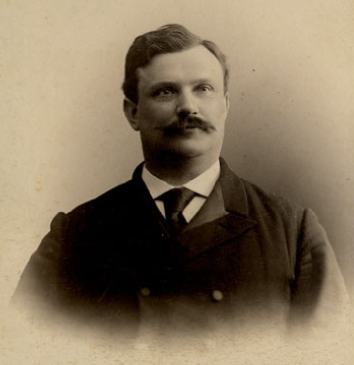

Member of the Legislative Assembly of Quebec for Sherbrooke
- In office 1900–1911
- Preceded by: Louis-Edmond Panneton
- Succeeded by: Calixte-Émile Therrien

Personal details
- Born: Jean-Marie-Joseph-Pantaléon Pelletier; July 27, 1860 Rivière-Ouelle, Canada East
- Died: October 19, 1924 (aged 64) Quebec City, Quebec
- Party: Liberal

Jean-Marie-Joseph-Pantaléon Pelletier (French pronunciation: [ʒɑ̃ maʁi ʒozɛf pɑ̃taleɔ̃ pɛltje]; July 27, 1860 – October 19, 1924) was a physician and political figure in Quebec. He represented Sherbrooke in the Legislative Assembly of Quebec from 1900 to 1911 as a Liberal. Pelletier was Speaker of the Legislative Assembly from 1909 to 1911.

== Biography ==
He was born in Rivière-Ouelle, Canada East, the son of Joseph Pelletier and Henriette Martin. Pelletier was educated at the Collège de Sainte-Anne-de-la-Pocatière and the Université Laval. He qualified as a physician in 1887 and, after interning in New York City and Paris, set up practice in Sherbrooke. Pelletier was surgeon at the Hôpital Sacré-Cœur and also served as coroner for Saint-François district. In 1897, he was named to the Quebec Board of Health. He was a lieutenant in the Canadian Militia with the 9th Battalion Volunteer Militia Rifles and served during the North-West Rebellion. He was later a captain and medical officer of the 11th Hussars in Richmond and later reaching the rank of lieutenant-colonel and first commanding officer of the newly raised 54th Regiment (Carabiniers de Sherbrooke). In 1888, he married Alice Hudon. Pelletier resigned his seat in the assembly in 1911 after he was named Quebec provincial representative in London. He died in Quebec City at the age of 64.

His uncle Charles Alphonse Pantaléon Pelletier served in the Canadian House of Commons and as Lieutenant-Governor of Quebec.
