= Gérard Lebel =

Canadian politician (1930–2020)

Member of the Legislative Assembly of Quebec for Rivière-du-Loup
- In office 1966–1970
- Preceded by: Alphonse Couturier
- Succeeded by: Paul Lafrance

President of the National Assembly of Quebec
- In office January 1, 1969 – December 23, 1969
- Preceded by: Rémi Paul
- Succeeded by: Raynald Fréchette

Personal details
- Born: January 12, 1930 Rivière-du-Loup, Quebec
- Died: July 15, 2020 (aged 90)
- Party: Union Nationale

Gérard Lebel (French pronunciation: [ʒeʁaʁ ləbɛl]; January 12, 1930 – July 15, 2020) was a Canadian politician from Quebec.

== Background ==
Gérard Lebel was born on January 12, 1930, in Rivière-du-Loup, Bas-Saint-Laurent. He became an attorney.

== Political career ==
Lebel ran as a Union Nationale candidate in the 1962 and 1966 elections against Liberal incumbent Alphonse Couturier in the district of Rivière-du-Loup. He lost the first time, but was successful on his second attempt.

From 1966 to 1968, he served as Deputy Speaker of the House. He was also Speaker from 1968 to 1969, and Minister of Communications in Jean-Jacques Bertrand's Cabinet from 1969 to 1970.

Lebel was defeated against Liberal candidate Paul Lafrance in the 1970 election.
