= Raynald Fréchette =

Canadian politician

Member of the National Assembly of Quebec for Sherbrooke
- In office 1966–1970
- Preceded by: Carrier Fortin
- Succeeded by: Jean-Paul Pépin
- In office 1981–1985
- Preceded by: Gérard Gosselin
- Succeeded by: André J. Hamel

President of the National Assembly of Quebec
- In office 24 February 1970 – 8 June 1970
- Preceded by: Gérard Lebel
- Succeeded by: Jean-Noël Lavoie

Personal details
- Born: October 13, 1933 Asbestos, Quebec
- Died: March 20, 2007 (aged 73) Sherbrooke, Quebec
- Party: Union Nationale; Parti Québécois

Raynald Fréchette (13 October 1933 – 20 March 2007) was a Quebec lawyer, judge and political figure.

== Early life ==
He was born on 13 October 1933 in Asbestos, Quebec, the son of a miner, and studied at the Collège Saint-Aimé there and the Université de Sherbrooke. He was admitted to the Bar of Quebec in 1961 and set up practice in Sherbrooke.

== Career ==
=== House Speaker ===
He won a seat to the provincial legislature in 1966 and became the Union Nationale Member for the district of Sherbrooke. He served as President of the National Assembly of Quebec (House Speaker) from February to June 1970, but lost re-election in 1970 Quebec general election, finishing fourth with 21% of the vote.

=== Cabinet Member ===
He returned to the National Assembly as a member of the Parti Québécois in 1981. Fréchette was Finance Minister in the cabinet of René Lévesque from April 1981 to September 1982, then Minister of Labour until October 1985. He was Minister of Justice and Minister of Labour in the cabinet of Pierre-Marc Johnson from October to December 1985. He was defeated by a narrow margin in 1985.

== Retirement ==
After his defeat in 1985, he returned to the practice of law and also hosted an open line show on a Sherbrooke radio station. In 1988, he was named a judge in the Quebec Superior Court at Montreal and was assigned to Saint-François district in 1991.

He died of cancer, aged 73, on 20 March 2007 in Sherbrooke, Quebec.
