= John Samuel Bourque =

Canadian politician (1894–1974)

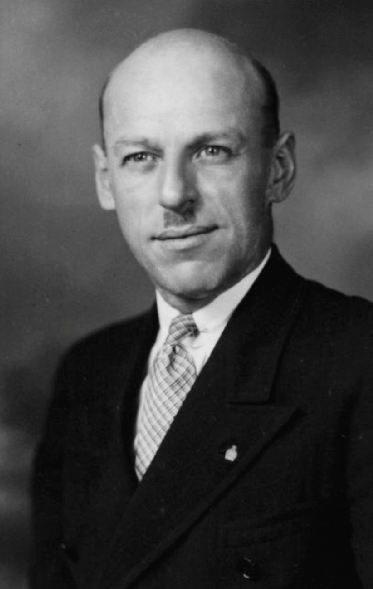

Member of the Legislative Assembly of Quebec for Sherbrooke
- In office 1935–1960
- Preceded by: Émery-Hector Fortier
- Succeeded by: Louis-Philippe Brousseau

Personal details
- Born: September 8, 1894 Sherbrooke, Quebec
- Died: March 5, 1974 (aged 79) Sherbrooke, Quebec
- Education: Politician

John Samuel Bourque (September 8, 1894 – March 5, 1974) was a Quebec politician, Cabinet Minister, military member and businessman. He was the Member of Legislative Assembly of Quebec for the riding of Sherbrooke for 25 years.

== Life and career ==
Born in Sherbrooke, Quebec, Bourque studied at the Petit Séminaire de Saint-Charles-Borromée in Sherbrooke, before being enrolled in the 22nd (French Canadian) Battalion, CEF, as a soldier and sergeant where he participated in World War I in the United Kingdom. He was also a colonel, sergeant, major and lieutenant-colonel for the Sherbrooke Fusilliers. He retired from the military service in 1943. While being in military duties, he was also a businessman running a lumber store.

Bourque was first elected in 1935 as a member of the Action libérale nationale which shortly after was merged with the Quebec Conservative Party to form the Union Nationale. He was re-elected for six additional terms until the 1960 elections in which he lost to the Quebec Liberal Party candidate. He served for several ministries in the Maurice Duplessis Cabinet. He was the Minister of Public Works from 1936 to 1939, Minister of Land and Forests from 1938 to 1939 and from 1944 to 1958, Minister of Hydraulic Resources from 1945 to 1958 and Minister of Finances from 1958 to 1960.
