= Christine Labrie =

Canadian politician

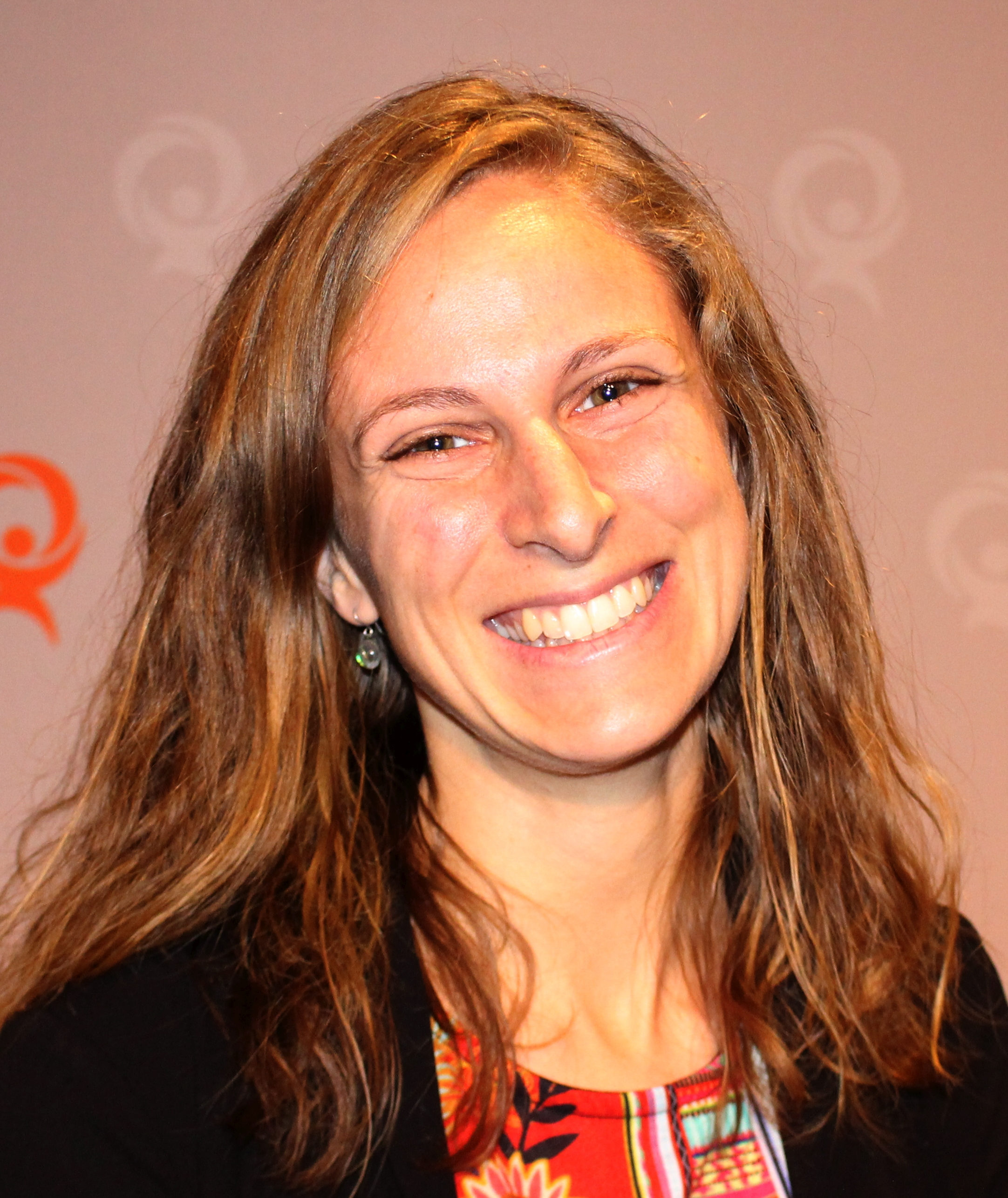
- Christine Labrie in December 2018

Co-Spokesperson for Québec Solidaire (interim)
- In office May 2, 2024 – November 16, 2024 Serving with Gabriel Nadeau-Dubois
- Preceded by: Émilise Lessard-Therrien
- Succeeded by: Ruba Ghazal

Member of the National Assembly of Quebec for Sherbrooke
- In office October 1, 2018 – August 27, 2026
- Preceded by: Luc Fortin
- Succeeded by: Stéphanie Vachon

Personal details
- Born: September 28, 1987 (age 39) Sherbrooke, Quebec, Canada
- Party: Québec solidaire
- Education: Université de Sherbrooke; Université de Laval; University of Ottawa
- Profession: Politician, historian, teacher
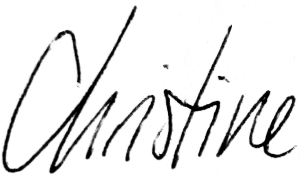
- Signature

Christine Labrie (born September 28, 1987) is a Canadian politician, historian, and teacher. She was elected to the National Assembly of Quebec in the 2018 provincial election and represented the electoral district of Sherbrooke as a member of Québec solidaire. She did not seek re-election in the 2026 general election.

== Electoral record ==
2022 Quebec general election: Sherbrooke
Party	Candidate	Votes	%	±%
Québec solidaire	Christine Labrie	15,548	41.91	+7.64
Coalition Avenir Québec	Caroline St-Hilaire	13,076	35.25	+11.86
Parti Québécois	Yves Bérubé-Lauzière	3,373	9.09	-5.05
Conservative	Zoée St-Amand	2,501	6.74	–
Liberal	François Vaes	2,166	5.84	-18.83
Green	Victoria Karny	204	0.55	-0.63
Parti nul	Raphaëlle Dompierre	113	0.30	-0.09
Climat Québec	Alain Barbier	69	0.19	–
Démocratie directe	Alexandre Asselin	48	0.13	–
Total valid votes		37,098	98.78	
Total rejected ballots		458	1.22	
Turnout		37,556	70.82	
Electors on the lists		53,033		

2018 Quebec general election: Sherbrooke
Party	Candidate	Votes	%	±%
Québec solidaire	Christine Labrie	12,315	34.27	+21.34
Liberal	Luc Fortin	8,865	24.67	-11.77
Coalition Avenir Québec	Bruno Vachon	8,403	23.39	+6.7
Parti Québécois	Guillaume Rousseau	5,244	14.59	-16.39
Green	Marie-Maud Côté-Rouleau	423	1.18	+0.21
Citoyens au pouvoir	Éric Lebrasseur	162	0.45	
New Democratic	Mona Louis-Jean	141	0.39	
Parti nul	Sara Richard	140	0.39	
Independent	Luc Lainé	95	0.26	
Bloc Pot	Jossy Roy	83	0.23	-0.15
Independent	Patrick Tétreault	61	0.17	
Total valid votes		35,932	98.69	
Total rejected ballots		476	1.31	
Turnout		36,408	71.51	
Eligible voters		50,912		
Québec solidaire gain from Liberal		Swing		+16.56
Source(s) "Rapport des résultats officiels du scrutin". Élections Québec.
