= Richard William Heneker =

Canadian businessman (1823-1912)

His Worship Richard William Heneker
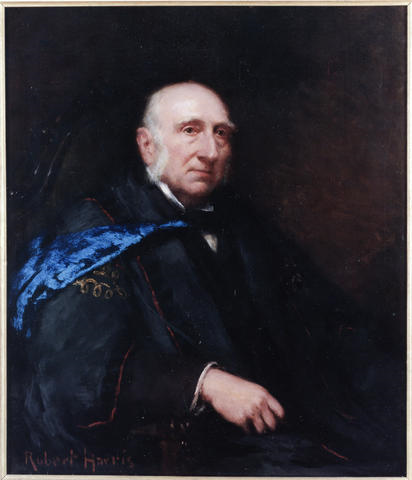
- Portrait of Heneker

Mayor of Sherbrooke
- In office 1868–1869
- Succeeded by: Louis-Edmond Panneton

Personal details
- Born: May 2, 1823 Dublin, Ireland
- Died: February 5, 1912 (aged 88) Bournemouth, England
- Spouse: Elizabeth Tuson
- Children: 3

Richard William Heneker (May 2, 1823 – August 15, 1912) was a Canadian businessman of Irish descent. Following his immigration to Canada in 1855, he settled in Sherbrooke, Quebec. After a long career in business, he left Canada in 1902 to retire in England.

For about fifty years, Heneker was a businessman and an influential leader in the Eastern Townships at the end of 19th century. Throughout his life in Canada, he pursued two missions: namely to enable Anglophones in the Sherbrooke region to emancipate themselves and build a regional economy controlled by residents of the Eastern Townships.

He acted as the first chairman of Bishop's College School and a Chancellor of Bishop's University.

== Childhood and studies ==
Richard William Heneker followed a program of studies at University College School in London. Subsequently, he studied architecture by private lessons.

== Biography ==
Career in England

At the age of 19, Heneker was hired by the firm of Charles Barry, architect of the Westminster Parliament buildings (London). He worked there until the end of the 1940s, then launched his own account still in architecture. On numerous occasions, Heneker exhibited drawings at the Royal Academy of Arts. For example, in 1846, Heneker won a second prize in a competition for this academy for the design of a railway station. In the early 1850s he was an associate member of the Royal Institute of British Architects; he operated a professional architectural services office with a colleague, Frederick Lawford.

Business career in Canada

Heneker immigrated to Canada in 1855 via Lowell, Massachusetts, United States. After consultations in Lowell, Heneker settles in Sherbrooke.

Heneker was deeply involved in business management in Sherbrooke. In 1855, the British American Land Company (acronym: BALC) appointed him commissioner of Sherbrooke. This company had been incorporated in 1832 under the direction of John Galt and several investors. The company's mission was to acquire and manage the development of 800,000 acres (320,000 ha) of Terre de la Couronne in Eastern Townships (Quebec). This development was aimed at helping British subjects to settle in this region of Lower Canada as part of the great wave of Irish immigration. Richard William Heneker ran this "land company" for 47 years.

In 1866, Heneker became a shareholder and co-founder of the Paton & Co. Heneker manufacture with four other businessmen. This company was renamed in 1868 Paton Manufacturing Company of Sherbrooke). Heneker served as president of this company, whose woolen factory proved to be the city's main employer for much of the late 19th century.

Heneker is registered as co-founder of the Bank of Eastern Townships. In 1874 he became president of the bank. In addition, from 1892 to 1902, Heneker was president of the Sherbrooke Gas and Water Company. The British American Land Company had rented properties located on the edge of the city's largest waterfalls to the Sherbrooke Gas and Water Company.

In 1888 Heneker appeared before the Royal Commission on Capital-Labor Relations in Canada.

British American Land Company landowners in the Sherbrooke area went from 1,200 acres in 1857 to 607 acres in 1884. Heneker's business vision was to operate properties in the Sherbrooke area, rather than to sell them. The London shareholders of the company decided to limit the powers of Heneker as a property developer; they ordered him to proceed with the liquidation of the company's assets.

Community involvement

In addition to his role as a businessman, Heneker got involved in municipal politics and at the community level with the Protestant and English-speaking population of the Eastern Townships. In 1859 he joined the board of directors of Bishop's College Lennoxville. He became vice-chancellor and chairman of the board in 1875; from 1878 to 1900, Heneker was chancellor.

Heneker is also considered to be the founder of the Sherbrooke Protestant Hospital by having led the campaign for its establishment. He served as the first president from 1888 to 1902 of the hospital's board of directors. In addition, Heneker was associate member (non-voting) from 1876 to 1881 of the Protestant committee of the Council for Public Instruction, ordinary member from 1881 to 1900, then chairman of the committee from 1892 to 1900. Heneker was involved in various capacities in within the Church of England, notably as a delegate to diocesan, provincial and general synods.

In 1889, Heneker invested with partners to incorporate The Sherbrooke Skating Club in order to build and operate a skating rink in the Saint Francis districtin Sherbrooke.

In addition, Heneker came to the aid of several settlement societies in the Eastern Townships, whose mission was to recruit English-speaking settlers.

Political involvement

Heneker was a candidate in the 1867 provincial election in the riding of Sherbrooke. However, his opponent Joseph Gibb Robertson was elected.

Heneker was elected municipal councilor of Sherbrooke in 1867–1868, then in 1876 to 1882. He was elected as mayor of the city of Sherbrooke, on January 20, 1868, succeeding Joseph Gibb Robertson. He was elected again to the town hall by the municipal councilors for a year in 1877.

His first term was short. In his absence, the City Council authorized on May 31, 1869, the compulsory purchase of 2,000 shares of the Sherbrooke, Eastern Townships and Kennebec Railway. Heneker is often absent from city council meetings; consequently, he cannot complete his mandate as mayor. Thus, he was replaced, during an early election, by J.G. Robertson.

== See also ==
- British American Land Company
- Sherbrooke
- List of mayors of Sherbrooke
