= Steve Lussier =

Canadian politician

Mayor of Sherbrooke
- In office November 16, 2017 – November 12, 2021
- Preceded by: Bernard Sévigny
- Succeeded by: Évelyne Beaudin

Personal details
- Born: 1973 (age 52–53) Saint-Jean-sur-Richelieu, Quebec
- Children: 2
- Occupation: Businessman, real estate developer

Steve Lussier (born 1973) is a Canadian politician, who was mayor of Sherbrooke, Quebec from 2017 until 2021. He was elected in the 2017 municipal election defeating incumbent mayor Bernard Sévigny.

Prior to his election as mayor, Lussier was a mortgage development advisor and a real estate developer.
