= Lennoxville, Quebec =

Lennoxville
- Borough
- Borough of Sherbrooke
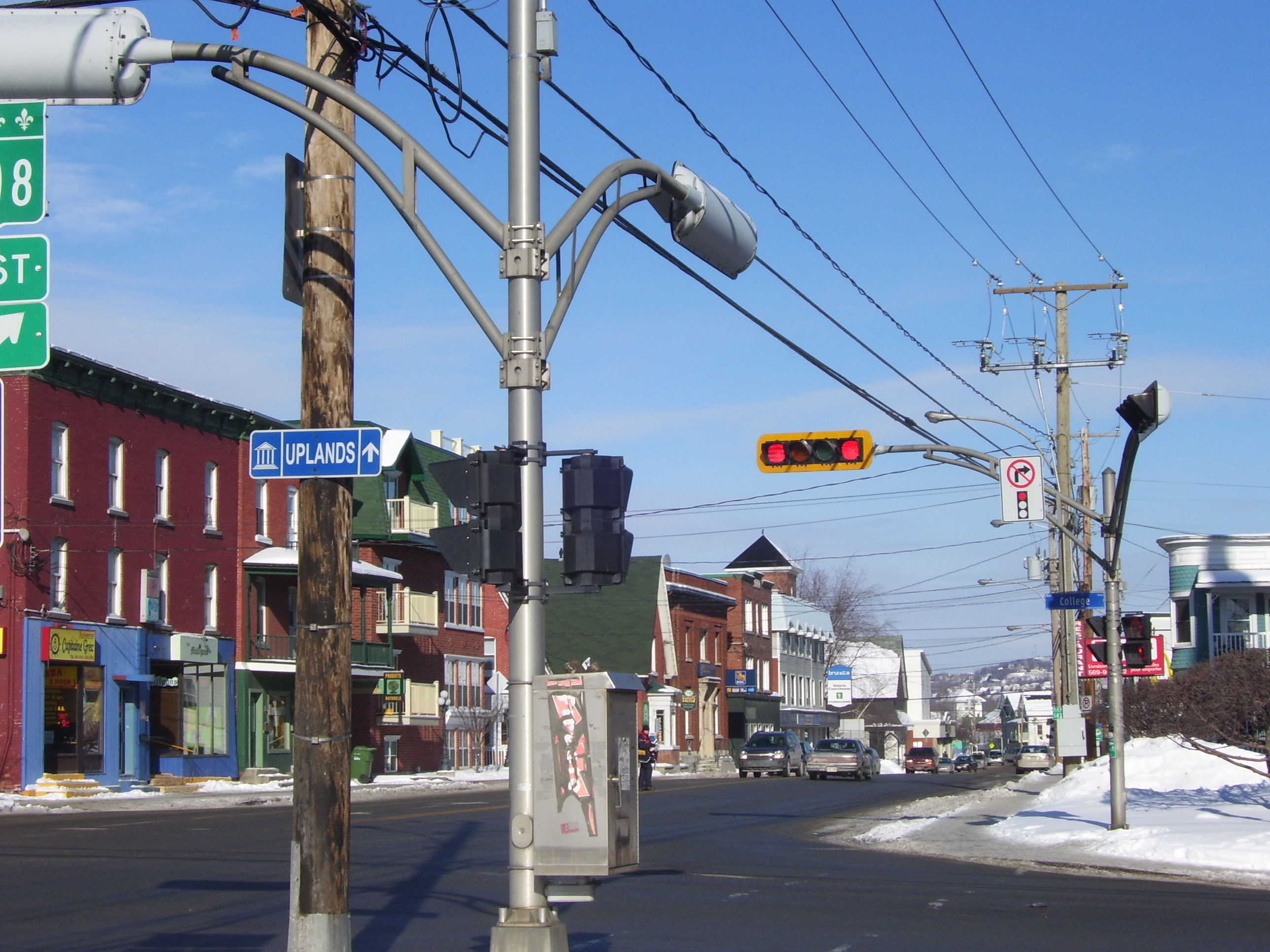
- Corner of Queen and College streets in downtown Lennoxville

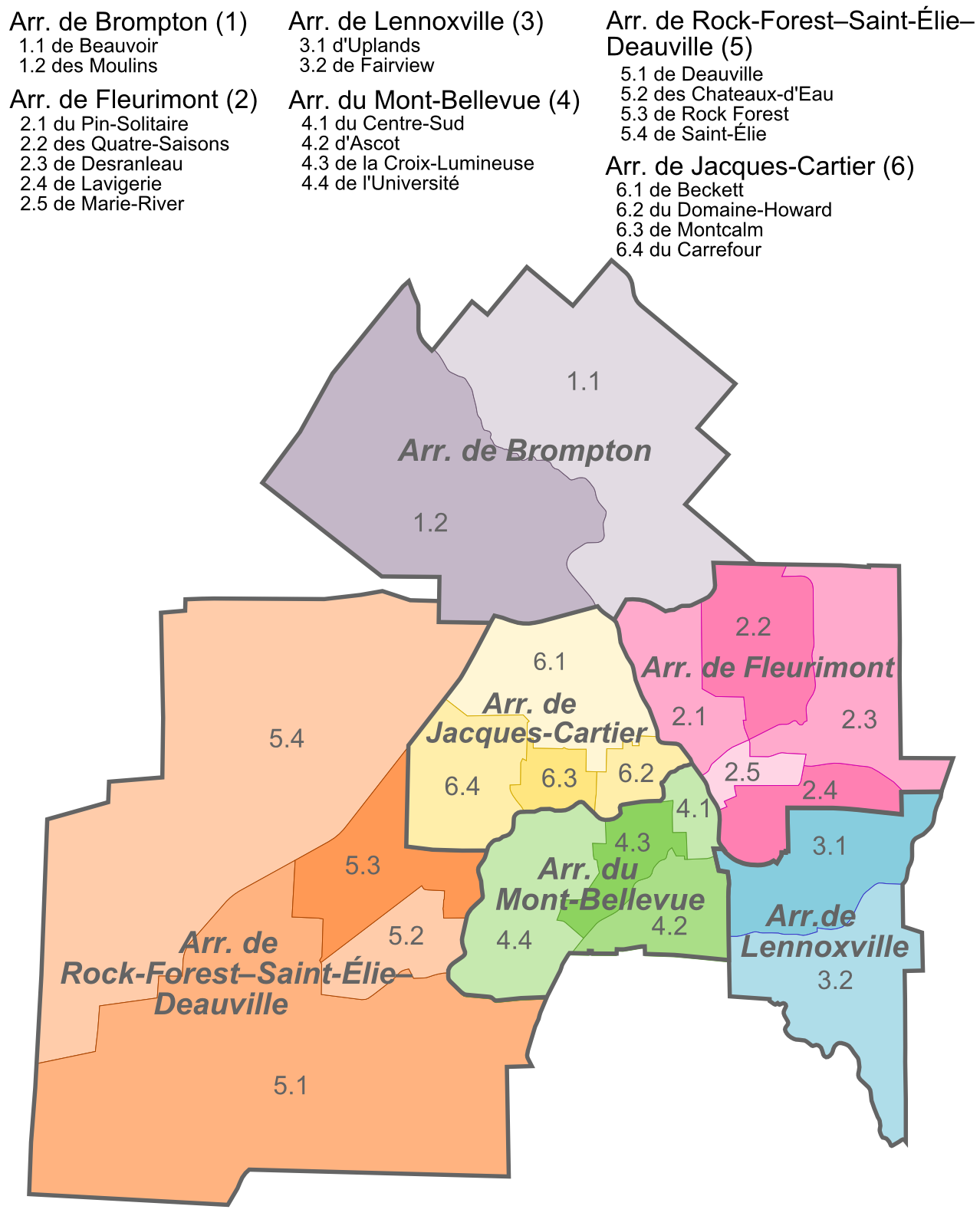

- Location within Southern Quebec Location within Quebec Location within Canada
- Coordinates: 45°21′58″N 71°51′22″W
- Country: Canada
- Province: Quebec
- Region: Estrie
- RCM: Sherbrooke
- Incorporated: 1871
- Merged: January 1, 2002

Government
  - City councillor: Claude Charron
  - Borough councillor: François Gilbert
  - Borough councillor: Bertrand Collins

Area
  - Total: 27.81 km^{2} (10.74 sq mi)

Population (2021)<ref>{{Cite web |url=https://www.sherbrooke.ca/en/municipal-life/borough-councils/borough-of-lennoxville}}</ref>
  - Total: 6,233
  - Density: 224.12/km^{2} (580.5/sq mi)
- Time zone: UTC-5 (EST)
- Area code: 819
- Website: Borough of Lennoxville

Lennoxville (French pronunciation: [lɛnɔksvil]) is an arrondissement, or borough, of the city of Sherbrooke, Quebec, Canada. Lennoxville is located at the confluence of the St. Francis and Massawippi River, approximately 5 kilometres (3.1 mi) south of downtown Sherbrooke.

Lennoxville had previously existed as an independent city until January 1, 2002 when the city of Lennoxville, along with several other formerly independent towns and cities in the region, were merged with the city of Sherbrooke. A demerger referendum held on June 20, 2004 failed; while majority of voters favoured resurrecting Lennoxville as an independent city, not enough registered voters did so to meet the required quorum of votes for passage.

== History ==
Lennoxville was first settled in 1819, although the Mallory family began farming at the edge of the eventual town limits in 1804. Its name was taken from Charles Lennox, 4th Duke of Richmond, who was then Governor General of Canada.

Jefferson Davis, President of the Confederate States of America during the American Civil War, lived in Lennoxville from 1867 to 1868 after being released on bail. He had spent two years imprisoned in Virginia awaiting his treason trial. Two of his sons went to Bishop's College School.

The city's war memorial is located at 150 Queen Street. A plaque honouring those soldiers from Lennoxville involved in the NATO-led occupation and War in Afghanistan (2001–2021) was added in 2018.

== Government ==
In 2025, former Liberal MP Marie-Claude Bibeau was elected as mayor of Sherbrooke.

The borough is represented by one councillor on Sherbrooke City Council. Bertrand Collins was elected to this position in 2025. Two councillors also serve on the local borough council but not on the full city council Claude Charon and François Gilbert were elected to these roles in the 2025 Sherbrooke municipal election.

== Geography ==
Climate data for Lennoxville
Month	Jan	Feb	Mar	Apr	May	Jun	Jul	Aug	Sep	Oct	Nov	Dec	Year
Record high humidex	14.9	18.5	27.0	31.7	38.4	42.7	46.3	44.5	39.6	33.3	25.9	19.2	46.3
Record high °C (°F)	17.0 (62.6)	18.2 (64.8)	25.8 (78.4)	29.6 (85.3)	34.9 (94.8)	34.0 (93.2)	34.0 (93.2)	32.9 (91.2)	33.8 (92.8)	27.2 (81.0)	22.9 (73.2)	17.7 (63.9)	34.9 (94.8)
Mean daily maximum °C (°F)	−4.1 (24.6)	−2.3 (27.9)	3.1 (37.6)	10.8 (51.4)	18.6 (65.5)	23.3 (73.9)	25.7 (78.3)	24.8 (76.6)	20.7 (69.3)	13.0 (55.4)	6.2 (43.2)	−0.7 (30.7)	11.6 (52.9)
Daily mean °C (°F)	−9.5 (14.9)	−8.3 (17.1)	−2.6 (27.3)	5.1 (41.2)	12.2 (54.0)	17.2 (63.0)	19.7 (67.5)	18.7 (65.7)	14.5 (58.1)	7.7 (45.9)	1.7 (35.1)	−5.2 (22.6)	5.9 (42.6)
Mean daily minimum °C (°F)	−14.9 (5.2)	−14.3 (6.3)	−8.3 (17.1)	−0.6 (30.9)	5.7 (42.3)	11.0 (51.8)	13.6 (56.5)	12.7 (54.9)	8.2 (46.8)	2.5 (36.5)	−2.8 (27.0)	−9.6 (14.7)	0.3 (32.5)
Record low °C (°F)	−44.4 (−47.9)	−43.9 (−47.0)	−40.0 (−40.0)	−20.6 (−5.1)	−6.7 (19.9)	−3.9 (25.0)	0.6 (33.1)	−1.1 (30.0)	−8.9 (16.0)	−11.1 (12.0)	−26.7 (−16.1)	−44.4 (−47.9)	−44.4 (−47.9)
Average precipitation mm (inches)	75.8 (2.98)	65.8 (2.59)	68.2 (2.69)	81.9 (3.22)	85.3 (3.36)	101.5 (4.00)	99.2 (3.91)	103.9 (4.09)	96.3 (3.79)	91.3 (3.59)	70.2 (2.76)	75.4 (2.97)	1,014.7 (39.95)
Average precipitation days (≥ 0.2. mm)	15.2	14.3	13.5	13.6	15.1	14.8	14.5	13.7	13.5	13.5	13.7	15.6	170.8

== Population ==
=== Linguistic Profile ===
Historically, as with most of the Eastern Townships, Lennoxville originated as a predominantly anglophone community with an initially small francophone population. Today the population is almost evenly split between anglophones and francophones with francophones making up a plurality among native speakers (35.3%) whereas English is the language most spoken at home. Of the various districts in Sherbrooke (which itself began as an anglophone community but has since transformed into a city where French is the dominant language), Lennoxville has the largest proportion of English speakers remaining. Lennoxville is designated as a bilingual borough and municipal services are provided in both English and French.

=== Fluctuation ===
The population of Lennoxville is 6,233 permanent residents as of 2021, with an additional 3,000 residents for approximately 9 months of the year due to student populations at the local college and university.

== Education ==
Several educational institutions are located in Lennoxville, including Bishop's University, Champlain Regional College, Bishop's College School and Alexander Galt Regional High School. During the school year, the population of Lennoxville increases significantly as students from elsewhere in Canada and around the world move to Lennoxville to attend school. Bishop's College School is home to Canada's oldest indoor ice hockey rink.

At Bishop's University, frosh week (orientation week) is held in the first week of the fall semester, which generally falls around the first week of September. Homecoming weekend is typically celebrated the last weekend of September, with a football game, gatherings of designated graduating classes, and various social functions.

Bishop's University is the only English-language university in the province of Quebec outside of Montreal.

== Transportation ==
Quebec Routes 143 and 108 provide access to Lennoxville from surrounding communities and nearby Autoroute 10 and Autoroute 55 provide easy access to Montreal, Quebec City, and the United States. Autoroute 410 extends from 108 to further east, bypassing Lennoxville, with a bridge built over the Massawippi river and culminating at R-108 near Glenday Road, Alexander Galt Regional High School, and the Dairy and Swine Research and Development Centre. The extension of Autoroute 410 redirects heavy truck traffic from downtown Lennoxville's often congested single intersection and was completed in 2021.

== Organized Crime ==
Lennoxville hosted a well-known headquarters for the Hell's Angels Motorcycle club on Queen street approximately halfway between Lennoxville and downtown Sherbrooke. It was a central hub during the Quebec Biker War, and continued to serve as a local headquarters for the gang until it was seized by police in 2009 as part of Opération SharQC. The headquarters would eventually be demolished in 2021 after spending 12 years abandoned.

This headquarters was also the site of the Lennoxville massacre in 1985.
