= Stéphanie Vachon =

Quebec politician

Stéphanie Vachon MNA

Member of the National Assembly for Sherbrooke
- Incumbent
- Assumed office October 5, 2026
- Preceded by: Christine Labrie

Personal details
- Party: Québec solidaire

Stéphanie Vachon is a Quebec politician who was the elected to the National Assembly of Quebec for Sherbrooke in the 2026 Quebec general election as a member of the Québec solidaire.

== Electoral record ==
2026 Quebec general election: Sherbrooke
** Preliminary results — Not yet official **
| Party | Candidate | Votes | % | ±% |
|---|---|---|---|---|
| Québec solidaire | Stéphanie Vachon | 10,101 | 27.22 | |
| Liberal | Pierre Cossette | 9,569 | 25.78 | |
| Parti Québécois | Gabriel Pallotta | 8,927 | 24.05 | |
| Coalition Avenir Québec | Fadéla Hamou | 4,029 | 10.86 | |
| Conservative | Jonathan Brault | 3,830 | 10.32 | |
| Libertarian | Jean-Michel Bérard | 234 | 0.63 | |
| Présence | Pierre-Luc Garon | 136 | 0.37 | |
| Climat Québec | Patrick Thouin | 133 | 0.36 | |
| Communist | Léo Boivin | 94 | 0.25 | |
| Démocratie directe | Luc Lainé | 62 | 0.17 | |
| Total valid votes | | | | |
| Total rejected ballots | | | | |
| Turnout | | | 70.17 | |
| Electors on the lists | | | – | – |
| Québec solidaire hold | | Swing | | |
Source: Élections Québec
