= Dorothy Heneker =

Canadian lawyer and feminist (1886–1968)

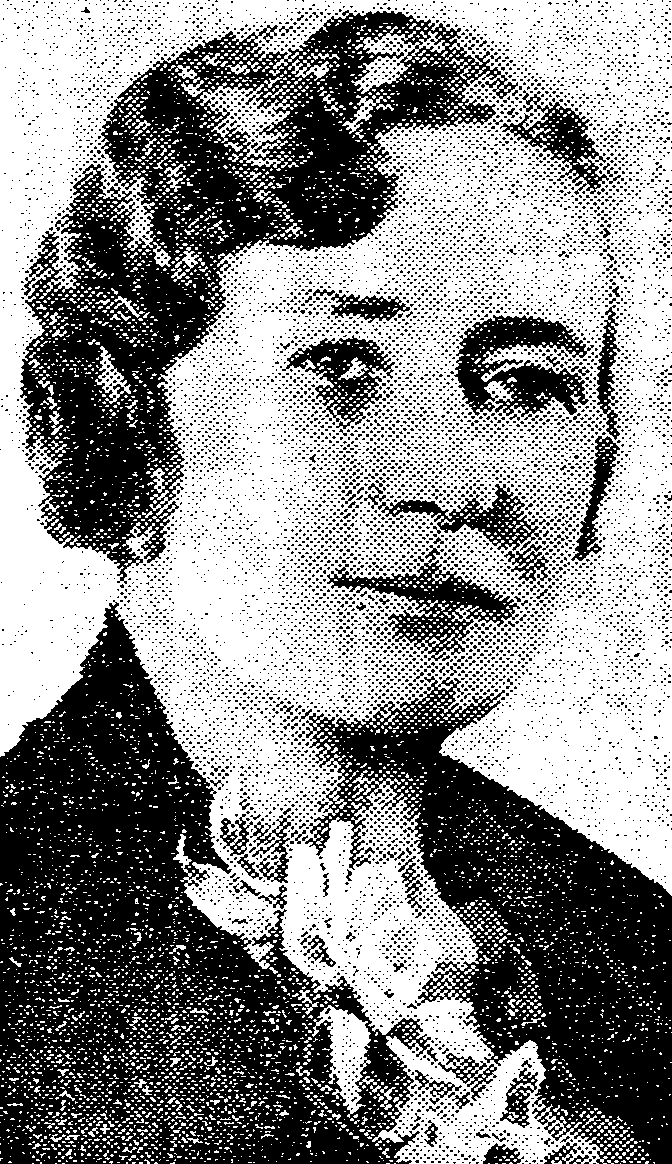
- Heneker in 1938
- Born: Dorothy Alice Heneker; 1886; Montreal, Quebec, Canada
- Died: 1968 (aged 81–82)
- Occupation: Lawyer
- Years active: 1930–1968
- Spouse: Arthur D. C. Cummins (m. 1952)
- Relatives: Richard William Heneker (grandfather)

Dorothy Alice Heneker (1886–1968) was a Canadian lawyer and feminist from Montreal. She was the director of the International Federation of Business and Professional Women from its formation in 1930 until 1936.

== Early life and eductation ==
Dorothy Alice Heneker was born in Montreal in 1886 to Richard and Alice Heneker (née Abbott), and had three siblings. Her father was a lawyer. She studied music and law at University of King's College and McGill University, graduating in 1925 and becoming the first woman to hold both a Bachelor of Civil Law and a Bachelor of Common Law.

== Career ==
After university, Heneker spent a few years at a financial house handling women's investments before she joined her father's law firm. In 1930, she was appointed the first director of the International Federation of Business and Professional Women (IFBPW). She served until 1936, and later became the vice president of the organisation. During her term as director, she campaigned for women's rights, supporting "the right of all people to work, unhampered by restrictions of sex or social status". In 1931, Heneker travelled to Norway and Sweden to give speeches encouraging Scandinavian participation in the IFBPW. In 1938, she travelled around the United States to discuss and support the status of women in the Assembly of the League of Nations.

== Personal life and death ==
In 1952, Heneker married Royal Navy surgeon commander Arthur D. C. Cummins. She died in 1968.
