= Cyrus Sullivan Clark =

American lumber dealer and manufacturer

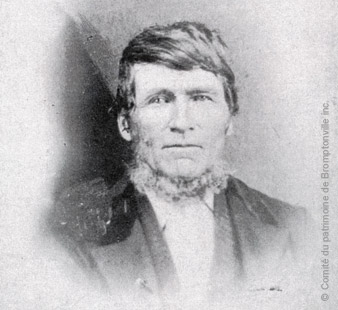
- Cyrus Sullivan Clark (1875)
- Born: December 8, 1809; Minot, Maine
- Died: July 28, 1880 (aged 70); Portland, Maine
- Education: Waterville College
- Occupations: Lumber dealer and manufacturer
- Known for: Lumber industry in the Eastern Townships
- Spouse: Charlotte Cooley
- Children: Charlotte Clark

Cyrus Sullivan Clark (December 8, 1809–July 28, 1880), together with George Benson Hall Jr. and the British American Land Company, were the largest participants in the lumber industry in the Eastern Townships of Quebec in the 19th century.

== Biography ==
=== Personal life ===
Born in Minot, Maine, he attended Waterville College and graduated in 1828, becoming a grocer in Portland, Maine. He later went into the lumber industry, involved in both manufacturing and dealing, and lived in Bangor, Maine for several years. He moved to Portland in 1854, and lived there until his death.

=== Business career ===
When the St. Lawrence and Atlantic Railroad was opened between Montreal and Portland in 1853, entrepreneurs from Montreal, Quebec City, New York City and Maine began to compete for berths around Lake Aylmer in order to replace Maine's declining lumber supplies. By 1856, Clark had become the largest licence holder in the region, (Note: despite restrictions on how much land could be held in any given township) controlling 410 square miles (1,062 km^{2}) of the total of 825 square miles (2,137 km^{2}) of timber limits available. He also owned 145,500 arpents (about122,947.5 acres (192 sq mi; 498 km^{2})) of land adjoining Lake Temiscouata and the Madawaska River, 19 licences on the Saint-Maurice River, and a town lot in Sherbrooke.

Because of extra duties that were imposed (Note: under An Act for the Sale and better Management of Timber upon the Public Lands, S.Prov.C. 1849, c. 30) on the export of unfinished logs in 1851, Clark built a sawmill at Brompton Falls in 1854 that, at 23,310 square feet (2,166 m^{2}), was the largest in North America.

Because of cash flow problems in 1855, Clark, together with his partners W.H. McCrillis and Thomas Howe, transferred all their Canadian properties and licences to City Bank and the Bank of Montreal in trust. When the Panic of 1857 resulted in an oversupply in the US timber market, the banks auctioned off their debt, which John Henry Pope bought for $30,000. Clark would later buy back the properties and licences from Pope in 1869, and Pope remained as the chief spokesman for the company afterwards.

In 1872, the British American Land Company sold 99,833 acres (156 sq mi; 404 km^{2}) to Clark, who purchased a further 7,901 acres (12 sq mi; 32 km^{2}) from the company in the following year. These holdings were approximately half the size of the Crown timber limits that he already possessed. During the Long Depression of the 1870s, Clark would lose these lands as a consequence of a default on the mortgage on his properties, but would be able to repurchase 42,745 acres (67 sq mi; 173 km^{2}) from the Eastern Townships Bank by 1879–80. He would formally enter into partnership with Pope to form the Brompton Mills Lumber Company. (Note: which would later, after several subsequent owners, be acquired by Kruger Inc.)
