= Sherbrooke City Council =

Sherbrooke City Council (in French: Conseil municipal de Sherbrooke) is the governing body for the mayor–council government in the city of Sherbrooke, in the Estrie region of Quebec. The council consists of a mayor and 14 councillors.

The councillors each sit both on the main city council and on separate borough councils, which serve a similar function for business that the city delegates to its boroughs instead of to the primary government. The city's smallest borough, Lennoxville, elects only a single representative to the main city council, and elects two representatives who serve only as borough councillors and do not sit on the main citywide body. In the three larger boroughs, however, only the borough's regular city councillors sit on the borough council.

== Mayor ==
- Marie-Claude Bibeau, since 2025

== Councillors ==
Elected in the 2025 Sherbrooke municipal election

Borough		District	Representative	Party
Mayor (at-large)			Marie-Claude Bibeau	Independent
1	Brompton–Rock Forest–Saint-Élie–Deauville			
1	Brompton–Rock Forest–Saint-Élie–Deauville	Lac Magog	Annie Faucher	Vision action Sherbrooke
1	Brompton–Rock Forest–Saint-Élie–Deauville	Rock Forest	François-Olivier Desmarais	Independent
1	Brompton–Rock Forest–Saint-Élie–Deauville	Saint-Élie	Christelle Lefèvre	Independent
1	Brompton–Rock Forest–Saint-Élie–Deauville	Brompton	Catherine Boileau	Sherbrooke citoyen
2	Fleurimont			
2	Fleurimont	Hôtel-Dieu	Laure Letarte-Lavoie	Sherbrooke citoyen
2	Fleurimont	Desranleau	Danielle Berthold	Independent
2	Fleurimont	Quatre-Saisons	Joanie Bellerose	Independent
2	Fleurimont	Pin-Solitaire	Pascale Larocque	Independent
3	Lennoxville			
3	Lennoxville	Lennoxville	Bertrand Bert Collins*	Independent
3	Lennoxville	Uplands (borough council)	Claude Charron	Independent
3	Lennoxville	Fairview (borough council)	François (Frank) Gilbert	Independent
4	Des Nations			
4	Des Nations	Université	Paul Gingues	Independent
4	Des Nations	Ascot	Geneviève La Roche	Independent
4	Des Nations	Lac-des-Nations	Karine Godbout	Independent
4	Des Nations	Golf	Pierre Avard	Independent
4	Des Nations	Carrefour	Fernanda Luz	Sherbrooke citoyen

* Borough presidents

== See also ==
- List of mayors of Sherbrooke
