= Fleurimont, Quebec =

Coordinates: 45°24′21.4″N 71°50′19.5″W

Fleurimont
- Borough
- Borough of Sherbrooke
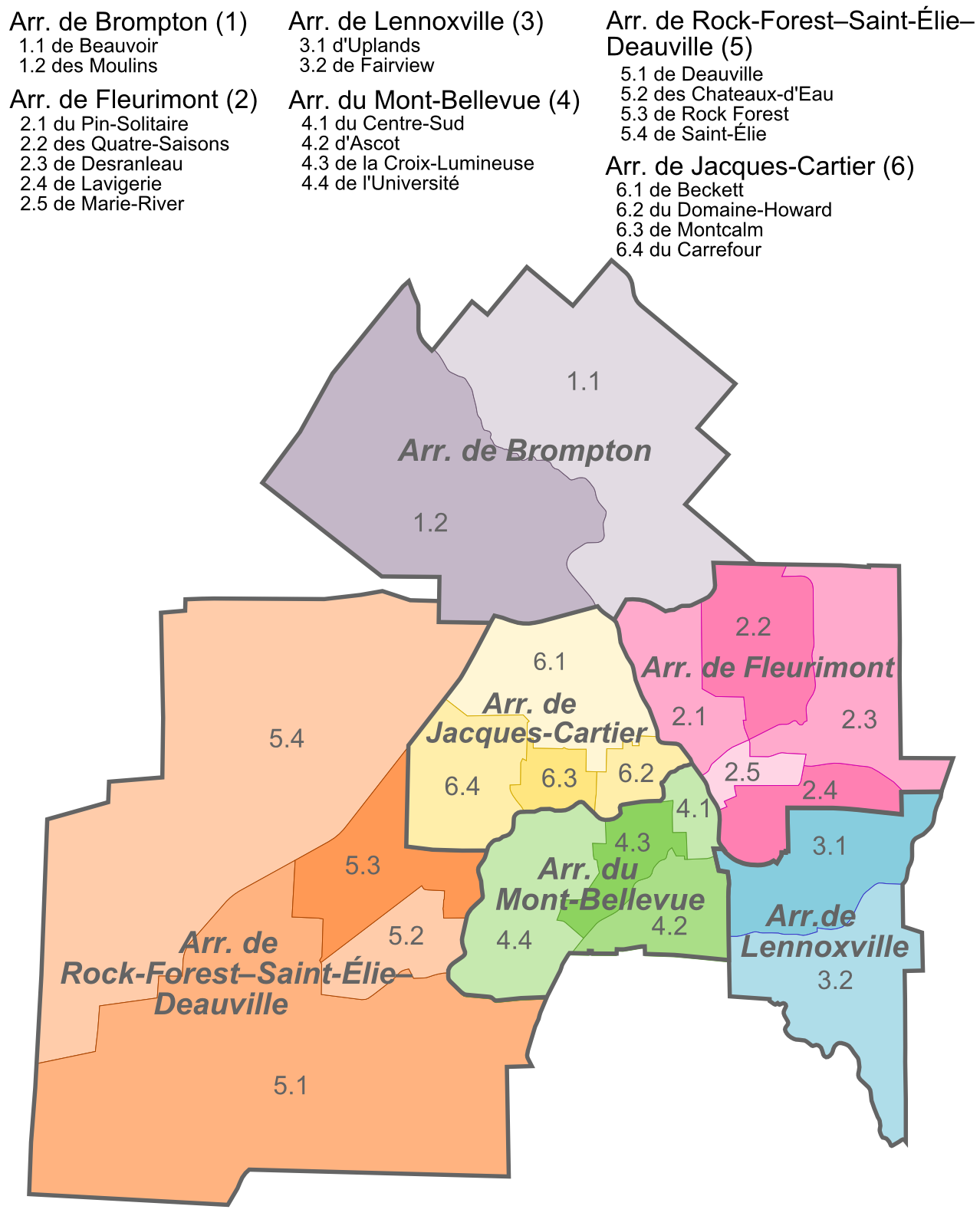
- Country: Canada
- Province: Quebec
- Region: Estrie
- RCM: Sherbrooke
- Merged: January 1, 2003

Government
  - City councillors: Louisda Brochu; Danielle Berthold; Rémi Demers; Hélène Dauphinais; Vincent Boutin

Area
  - Land: 43 km^{2} (17 sq mi)

Population (2016)
  - Total: 44,950
  - Density: 1,045.35/km^{2} (2,707.4/sq mi)
- Time zone: UTC-5 (EST)
- Area code: 819
- Website: Borough of Fleurimont

Fleurimont (French pronunciation: [flœʁimɔ̃]) is an arrondissement, or borough, of the city of Sherbrooke, Quebec, Canada on the Saint-François River. The borough comprises the former city of Fleurimont and the eastern portion of pre-amalgamation Sherbrooke.

As a separate city, Fleurimont had a population of 16,521 in the Canada 2001 Census. As a borough of Sherbrooke, it has a population of 44,950, making it the third most populous borough in the city, behind Brompton–Rock Forest–Saint-Élie–Deauville and Des Nations

== Government ==
The borough is represented by five councillors on the Sherbrooke City Council.
