= Ludger Forest (L'Assomption MLA) =

Canadian politician

Ludger Forest (December 20, 1826 – April 16, 1903) was a physician and political figure in Quebec. He represented L'Assomption in the Legislative Assembly of Quebec from 1886 to 1890 as a Liberal.

He was born in L'Assomption, Lower Canada, the son of François Forest and Marie Amireau. Forest was educated in Collège de l'Assomption and Victoria College in Montreal, Quebec. He qualified to practise as a doctor in 1856 and set up his practice at L'Assomption. In 1858, Forest married Athala, the daughter of Pierre-Urgel Archambault. He ran unsuccessfully for a seat in the House of Commons in 1874 and 1879. His election to the Quebec assembly in 1886 was overturned after an appeal in 1888, but he won the subsequent by-election. Forest ran unsuccessfully for reelection in 1890 and in 1892. He died at L'Assomption at the age of 76.

His nephew, also named Ludger Forest, also served in the Quebec assembly.
