= Joseph Gibb Robertson =

Canadian politician

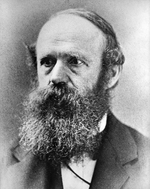
- Joseph Gibb Robertson

Member of the Legislative Assembly of Quebec for Sherbrooke
- In office 1867–1892
- Succeeded by: Louis-Edmond Panneton

Personal details
- Born: 1 January 1820 Stuartfield, Scotland
- Died: 13 March 1899 (aged 79) Sherbrooke, Quebec
- Party: Conservative

Joseph Gibb Robertson (1 January 1820 – 13 March 1899) was a Scottish-born merchant, farmer and political figure in Quebec. He represented Sherbrooke in the Legislative Assembly of Quebec from 1867 to 1892 as a Conservative.

He was born in Stuartfield, Aberdeenshire, the son of the Reverend James Robertson and Elizabeth Murray, and came to Sherbrooke, Lower Canada with his family in 1836. Robertson established a store in Sherbrooke and speculated in land. He owned the Sherbrooke Grist Mill and was a director of the Sherbrooke and Magog Turnpike Road Company. Robertson helped promote the Sherbrooke, Eastern Townships and Kennebec Railway (later part of the Quebec Central Railway) and served as its president. He served as secretary-treasurer for Sherbrooke and was mayor from 1854 to 1855, from 1857 to 1867 and from 1869 to 1872. In 1870, he married Mary Jane Woodward.

Robertson was treasurer for the province several times during the period from 1869 to 1887. He resigned his seat in the cabinet in 1874 during the Tanneries scandal and again later that year because of his opposition to government ownership of the North Shore Railway. He was defeated when he ran for reelection in 1892. Robertson served as postmaster for Sherbrooke from 1892 until his death there at the age of 79.

His sister was Margaret Murray Robertson, a novelist. His brother Andrew was a lawyer and governor for McGill University.
