= Margaret Murray Robertson =

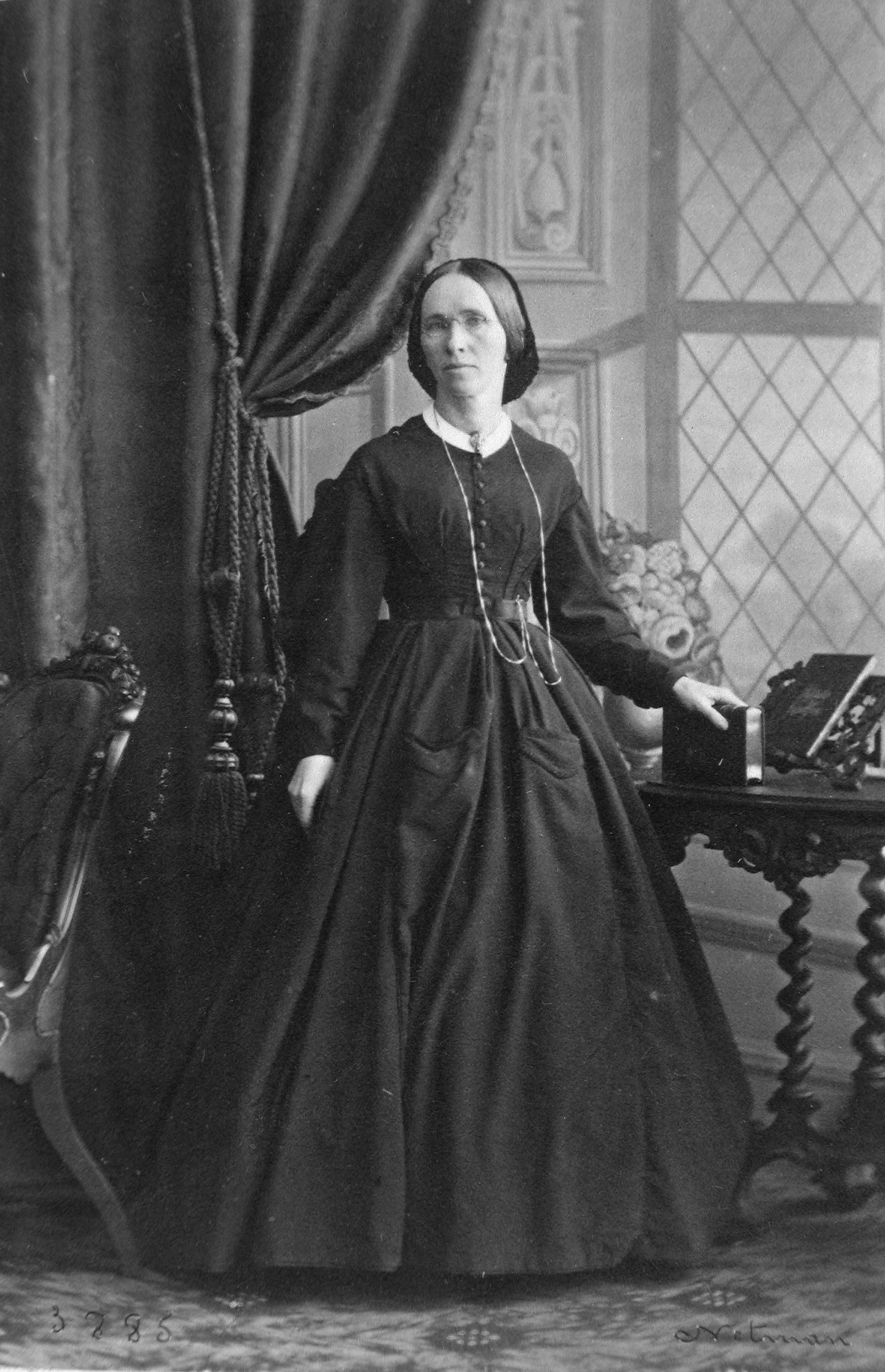
- 1862 portrait by William Notman
- Born: 22 April 1823; Stuartfield, Scotland
- Died: 14 February 1897 (aged 73); Montreal, Quebec
- Occupations: Teacher, writer

Margaret Murray Robertson (22 April 1823 – 14 February 1897) was a Scottish-Canadian teacher and writer.

== Biography ==
Margaret was born in Stuartfield, Scotland, 22 April 1823, the daughter of Reverend James Robertson, Congregational minister, and Elizabeth Murray. She had a sister Mary and brothers John, Joseph, and Andrew. In 1832, her mother died, whereupon the devout family emigrated to Derby, Vermont. Four years later, they moved to Sherbrooke in Quebec. Both Mary and Margaret attended Mount Holyoke Female Seminary in Massachusetts. Afterward, they became instructors at the Sherbrooke Ladies' Academy, where Margaret remained until 1865.

In 1864, she won the Galt Prize essay competition with an essay titled "An Essay on Common School Education." At the age of 42, Margaret left her teaching career to become a full-time writer. Her first novel, Christie Redfern's Troubles, was published in 1866. During her writing career, she had 14 or more novels published up through 1890. Most of the protagonists in her novels were female, and the themes were of home and family.

She died in Montreal in 1897.

== Bibliography ==
- Christie Redfern's troubles (1866)
- Christie, or, the way home (1866), two volumes
- Stephen Grattan's faith (1867)
- The Orphans of Glen Elder (1868)
- Ethan Hale, or, light at last (1869)
- Janet's Love and Service (1869)
- The little house in the hollow (1869)
- Little Serena in a strange land (1870)
- The Inglises, or, how the way opened (1872)
- The twa Miss Dawsons (1880)
- Frederica and her guardians: the perils of orphanhood (1874)
- The story of Little Gabriel (1881)
- Shenac's work at home (1883)
- Eunice (1887)
- Allison Bain, or, by a way she knew not (1887)
- David Fleming's forgiveness (1891)
