= Luc Fortin =

Canadian politician in Quebec

Member of the National Assembly of Quebec for Sherbrooke
- In office April 7, 2014 – August 29, 2018
- Preceded by: Serge Cardin
- Succeeded by: Christine Labrie

Personal details
- Party: Quebec Liberal Party

Luc Fortin is a Canadian politician in Quebec, who was elected to the National Assembly of Quebec in the 2014 election. He represented the electoral district of Sherbrooke as a member of the Quebec Liberal Party.

He served in the Couillard Cabinet as the Minister of Culture and Communications.

== Electoral record ==
2018 Quebec general election: Sherbrooke
Party	Candidate	Votes	%	±%
Québec solidaire	Christine Labrie	12,315	34.27	+21.34
Liberal	Luc Fortin	8,865	24.67	-11.77
Coalition Avenir Québec	Bruno Vachon	8,403	23.39	+6.7
Parti Québécois	Guillaume Rousseau	5,244	14.59	-16.39
Green	Marie-Maud Côté-Rouleau	423	1.18	+0.21
Citoyens au pouvoir	Éric Lebrasseur	162	0.45	
New Democratic	Mona Louis-Jean	141	0.39	
Parti nul	Sara Richard	140	0.39	
Independent	Luc Lainé	95	0.26	
Bloc Pot	Jossy Roy	83	0.23	-0.15
Independent	Patrick Tétreault	61	0.17	
Total valid votes		35,932	98.69	
Total rejected ballots		476	1.31	
Turnout		36,408	71.51	
Eligible voters		50,912		
Québec solidaire gain from Liberal		Swing		+16.56
Source(s) "Rapport des résultats officiels du scrutin". Élections Québec.

2014 Quebec general election
Party	Candidate	Votes	%	±%
Liberal	Luc Fortin	12,380	36.44	+1.31
Parti Québécois	Serge Cardin	10,525	30.98	-11.14
Coalition Avenir Québec	Philippe Girard	5,672	16.69	+4.89
Québec solidaire	Hélène Pigot	4,393	12.93	+6.08
Green	Jeremy Andrews	328	0.97	-0.11
Option nationale	Jean-Simon Campbell	321	0.94	-1.89
Conservative	François Drogue	181	0.53	–
Bloc Pot	Jossy Roy	130	0.38	–
Independent	Hubert Richard	48	0.14	–
Total valid votes		33,978	98.65	–
Total rejected ballots		464	1.35	–
Turnout		34,442	69.93	-8.17
Electors on the lists		49,255	–	–
