= Sherbrooke (provincial electoral district) =

Provincial electoral district in Quebec, Canada

Coordinates: 45.4°N 71.9°W

Quebec electoral district

Provincial electoral district
- Legislature: National Assembly of Quebec
MNA
Stéphanie Vachon
Québec solidaire
- District created: 1867
- First contested: 1867
- Last contested: 2026

Demographics
- Population (2011): 65,800
- Electors (2012): 48,402
- Area (km²): 58.7
- Pop. density (per km²): 1,121
- Census division: Sherbrooke (part)
- Census subdivision: Sherbrooke (part)

Sherbrooke is a provincial electoral district in the Estrie region of Quebec, Canada. It comprises the Jacques-Cartier and Mont-Bellevue boroughs of the city of Sherbrooke.

It was created for the 1867 election (and an electoral district of that name existed earlier in the Legislative Assembly of the Province of Canada and the Legislative Assembly of Lower Canada).

In the change from the 2001 to the 2011 electoral map, its territory was unchanged.

== Members of the Legislative Assembly / National Assembly ==
Legislature	Years	Member	Party
1st	1867–1869	Joseph Gibb Robertson	Conservative
1st	1869–1871	Joseph Gibb Robertson	Conservative
2nd	1871–1875	Joseph Gibb Robertson	Conservative
3rd	1875–1878	Joseph Gibb Robertson	Conservative
4th	1878–1879	Joseph Gibb Robertson	Independent
4th	1879–1881	Joseph Gibb Robertson	Conservative
5th	1881–1884	Joseph Gibb Robertson	Conservative
5th	1884–1886	Joseph Gibb Robertson	Conservative
6th	1886–1890	Joseph Gibb Robertson	Conservative
7th	1890–1892	Joseph Gibb Robertson	Conservative
8th	1892–1897	Louis-Edmond Panneton	Conservative
9th	1897–1900	Louis-Edmond Panneton	Conservative
10th	1900–1904	Jean-Marie-Joseph-Pantaléon Pelletier	Liberal
11th	1904–1908	Jean-Marie-Joseph-Pantaléon Pelletier	Liberal
12th	1908–1911	Jean-Marie-Joseph-Pantaléon Pelletier	Liberal
12th	1911–1912	Calixte-Émile Therrien	Liberal
13th	1912–1916	Calixte-Émile Therrien	Liberal
14th	1916–1919	Calixte-Émile Therrien	Liberal
15th	1919–1922	Joseph-Henri Lemay	Liberal
15th	1922–1923	Ludger Forest	Liberal
16th	1923–1923†	Moïse O'Bready	Conservative
16th	1924–1927	Armand-Charles Crépeau	Conservative
17th	1927–1931	Armand-Charles Crépeau	Conservative
18th	1931–1935	Émery-Hector Fortier	Liberal
19th	1935–1936	John Samuel Bourque	Action liberale nationale
20th	1936–1939	John Samuel Bourque	Union Nationale
21st	1939–1944	John Samuel Bourque	Union Nationale
22nd	1944–1948	John Samuel Bourque	Union Nationale
23rd	1948–1952	John Samuel Bourque	Union Nationale
24th	1952–1956	John Samuel Bourque	Union Nationale
25th	1956–1960	John Samuel Bourque	Union Nationale
26th	1960–1962	Louis-Philippe Brousseau	Liberal
27th	1962–1966	Carrier Fortin	Liberal
28th	1966–1970	Raynald Fréchette	Union Nationale
29th	1970–1973	Jean-Paul Pépin	Liberal
30th	1973–1976	Jean-Paul Pépin	Liberal
31st	1976–1981	Gérard Gosselin	Parti Québécois
32nd	1981–1985	Raynald Fréchette	Parti Québécois
33rd	1985–1989	André Hamel	Liberal
34th	1989–1994	André Hamel	Liberal
35th	1994–1998	Marie Malavoy	Parti Québécois
36th	1998–2003	Jean Charest	Liberal
37th	2003–2007	Jean Charest	Liberal
38th	2007–2008	Jean Charest	Liberal
39th	2008–2012	Jean Charest	Liberal
40th	2012–2014	Serge Cardin	Parti Québécois
41st	2014–2018	Luc Fortin	Liberal
42nd	2018–2022	Christine Labrie	Québec solidaire
43rd	2022–2026	Christine Labrie	Québec solidaire
44th	2026–Present	Stéphanie Vachon	Québec solidaire

== Election results ==
2026 Quebec general election
** Preliminary results — Not yet official **
Party	Candidate	Votes	%	±%
Québec solidaire	Stéphanie Vachon	10,101	27.22	
Liberal	Pierre Cossette	9,569	25.78	
Parti Québécois	Gabriel Pallotta	8,927	24.05	
Coalition Avenir Québec	Fadéla Hamou	4,029	10.86	
Conservative	Jonathan Brault	3,830	10.32	
Libertarian	Jean-Michel Bérard	234	0.63	
Présence	Pierre-Luc Garon	136	0.37	
Climat Québec	Patrick Thouin	133	0.36	
Communist	Léo Boivin	94	0.25	
Démocratie directe	Luc Lainé	62	0.17	
Total valid votes				
Total rejected ballots				
Turnout			70.17	
Electors on the lists			–	–
Québec solidaire hold		Swing		
Source: Élections Québec

2022 Quebec general election
Party	Candidate	Votes	%	±%
Québec solidaire	Christine Labrie	15,548	41.91	+7.64
Coalition Avenir Québec	Caroline St-Hilaire	13,076	35.25	+11.86
Parti Québécois	Yves Bérubé-Lauzière	3,373	9.09	-5.05
Conservative	Zoée St-Amand	2,501	6.74	–
Liberal	François Vaes	2,166	5.84	-18.83
Green	Victoria Karny	204	0.55	-0.63
Parti nul	Raphaëlle Dompierre	113	0.30	-0.09
Climat Québec	Alain Barbier	69	0.19	–
Démocratie directe	Alexandre Asselin	48	0.13	–
Total valid votes		37,098	98.78	
Total rejected ballots		458	1.22	
Turnout		37,556	70.82	
Electors on the lists		53,033		

2018 Quebec general election
Party	Candidate	Votes	%	±%
Québec solidaire	Christine Labrie	12,315	34.27	+21.34
Liberal	Luc Fortin	8,865	24.67	-11.77
Coalition Avenir Québec	Bruno Vachon	8,403	23.39	+6.7
Parti Québécois	Guillaume Rousseau	5,244	14.59	-16.39
Green	Marie-Maud Côté-Rouleau	423	1.18	+0.21
Citoyens au pouvoir	Éric Lebrasseur	162	0.45	
New Democratic	Mona Louis-Jean	141	0.39	
Parti nul	Sara Richard	140	0.39	
Independent	Luc Lainé	95	0.26	
Bloc Pot	Jossy Roy	83	0.23	-0.15
Independent	Patrick Tétreault	61	0.17	
Total valid votes		35,932	98.69	
Total rejected ballots		476	1.31	
Turnout		36,408	71.51	
Eligible voters		50,912		
Québec solidaire gain from Liberal		Swing		+16.56
Source(s) "Rapport des résultats officiels du scrutin". Élections Québec.

2014 Quebec general election
Party	Candidate	Votes	%	±%
Liberal	Luc Fortin	12,380	36.44	+1.31
Parti Québécois	Serge Cardin	10,525	30.98	-11.14
Coalition Avenir Québec	Philippe Girard	5,672	16.69	+4.89
Québec solidaire	Hélène Pigot	4,393	12.93	+6.08
Green	Jeremy Andrews	328	0.97	-0.11
Option nationale	Jean-Simon Campbell	321	0.94	-1.89
Conservative	François Drogue	181	0.53	–
Bloc Pot	Jossy Roy	130	0.38	–
Independent	Hubert Richard	48	0.14	–
Total valid votes		33,978	98.65	–
Total rejected ballots		464	1.35	–
Turnout		34,442	69.93	-8.17
Electors on the lists		49,255	–	–

2012 Quebec general election
Party	Candidate	Votes	%	±%
Parti Québécois	Serge Cardin	15,909	42.12	+4.53
Liberal	Jean Charest	13,267	35.13	-10.11
Coalition Avenir Québec	Philippe Girard	4,457	11.80	+4.95*
Québec solidaire	Christian Bibeau	2,586	6.85	+0.41
Option nationale	Évelyne Beaudin	1,069	2.83	–
Green	Suzanne Richer	407	1.08	-2.28
Parti indépendantiste	Christian Clavet	73	0.19	–
Total valid votes		37,768	99.10	–
Total rejected ballots		344	0.90	–
Turnout		38,112	78.10	+15.49
Electors on the lists		48,799	–	–

* Result compared to Action démocratique

2008 Quebec general election
Party	Candidate	Votes	%	±%
Liberal	Jean Charest	13,694	45.24	+8.68
Parti Québécois	Laurent-Paul Maheux	11,380	37.59	+4.74
Action démocratique	Jacques Joly	2,074	6.85	-10.99
Québec solidaire	Christian Bibeau	1,948	6.44	+0.14
Green	Steve Dubois	1,016	3.36	-2.77
Independent	Hubert Richard	158	0.52	+0.20
Total valid votes		30,270	98.68	–
Total rejected ballots		405	1.32	–
Turnout		30,675	62.61	-11.62
Electors on the lists		48,995	–	–

2007 Quebec general election
Party	Candidate	Votes	%	±%
Liberal	Jean Charest	13,136	36.56	-10.39
Parti Québécois	Claude Forgues	11,804	32.85	-6.67
Action démocratique	Michel Dumont	6,409	17.84	+5.91
Québec solidaire	Christian Bibeau	2,263	6.30	+4.88*
Green	Steve Dubois	2,203	6.13	–
Independent	Hubert Richard	115	0.32	–
Total valid votes		35,930	99.13	–
Total rejected ballots		316	8.87	–
Turnout		36,246	74.23	+0.74
Electors on the lists		48,831	–	–

* Result compared to UFP

2003 Quebec general election
Party	Candidate	Votes	%	±%
Liberal	Jean Charest	16,403	46.95	-0.46
Parti Québécois	Marie Malavoy	13,806	39.52	-5.04
Action démocratique	Peter Downey	4,169	11.93	+5.11
UFP	Normand Gilbert	496	1.42	+0.89
People's Front	Serge Lachapelle	64	0.18	–

1998 Quebec general election
Party	Candidate	Votes	%	±%
Liberal	Jean Charest	15,093	47.41	+4.56
Parti Québécois	Marie Malavoy	14,186	44.56	-2.75
Action démocratique	Patrick C. Rouillard	2,171	6.82	-1.41
Independent	Normand Gilbert	169	0.53	–
Bloc Pot	Christian Meunier	166	0.52	–
Natural Law	Christian Simard	53	0.17	-0.88
Liberal gain from Parti Québécois		Swing		+3.66

1995 Quebec referendum
Side	Votes	%
Oui	19,826	53.28
Non	17,384	46.72

1994 Quebec general election
Party	Candidate	Votes	%	±%
Parti Québécois	Marie Malavoy	14,733	47.31	+7.58
Liberal	Gilles Lapointe	13,342	42.84	-8.55
Action démocratique	Patrick Morin	2,564	8.23	–
Natural Law	Serge Trépanier	326	1.05	–
Equality	Hartley Doyle	176	0.57	–

1992 Charlottetown Accord referendum
Side	Votes	%
Non	18,564	58.70
Oui	13,059	41.30

1989 Quebec general election
Party	Candidate	Votes	%
Liberal	André Hamel	14,604	51.39
Parti Québécois	Jacques Blanchette	11,290	39.73
Green	Tracy Allard	1,578	5.55
New Democratic	Mario Mercier	521	1.83
Parti 51	Yvon Rivet	315	1.11
Communist	Yves Lawler	59	0.21
Marxist–Leninist	Normand Guy	50	0.18
Total valid votes		28,417	97.66
Total rejected ballots		680	2.34
Turnout		29,097	76.37
Electors on the lists		38.098	–

1985 Quebec general election
Party	Candidate	Votes	%
Liberal	André Hamel	14,163	49.31
Parti Québécois	Raynald Fréchette	13,515	47.05
Green	Hugues Desrochers	845	2.94
Christian Socialism	Vincent Séguin	104	0.36
Communist	Yves Lawler	97	0.34
Total valid votes		28,724	98.03
Total rejected ballots		577	1.97
Turnout		29,301	75.67
Electors on the lists		38,722	–

1981 Quebec general election
Party	Candidate	Votes	%
Parti Québécois	Raynald Fréchette	16,194	52.83
Liberal	Alain Cousineau	13,885	45.25
Union Nationale	Denis Loubier	450	1.47
Marxist–Leninist	Louis Davignon	125	0.41
Total valid votes		30,654	98.94
Total rejected ballots		328	1.06
Turnout		30,982	83.00
Electors on the lists		37,329	–

1980 Quebec referendum
Side	Votes	%
Non	17,040	56.80
Oui	12,960	43.20

1976 Quebec general election
Party	Candidate	Votes	%
Parti Québécois	Gérard Gosselin	12,440	42.51
Liberal	Jean-Paul Pépin	8,545	29.20
Union Nationale	Guy Bureau	6,255	21.38
Ralliement créditiste	Rosario Lehoux	1,872	6.40
Independent	Jacques Boutin	102	0.35
Independent	Robert Tremblay	48	0.16
Total valid votes		29,262	97.66
Total rejected ballots		701	2.34
Turnout		29,963	84.69
Electors on the lists		35,380	–

1973 Quebec general election
Party	Candidate	Votes	%
Liberal	Jean-Paul Pépin	15,117	52.38
Parti Québécois	Jean-Jacques Lafontaine	9,035	31.31
Parti créditiste	Réjean Giroux	3,042	10.54
Union Nationale	Marcel Côté	1,667	5.78
Total valid votes		28,861	98.31
Total rejected ballots		497	1.69
Turnout		29,358	80.87
Electors on the lists		36,301	–

1970 Quebec general election
Party	Candidate	Votes	%
Liberal	Jean-Paul Pépin	17,319	34.26
Ralliement créditiste	Adélard Larose	11,716	23.18
Parti Québécois	Jean-Jacques Bégin	10,783	21.33
Union Nationale	Raynald Fréchette	10,421	20.62
New Democratic	Jean-Paul Blouin	307	0.61
Total valid votes		50,546	98.37
Total rejected ballots		835	1.63
Turnout		51,381	84.25
Electors on the lists		60,989	–

1966 Quebec general election
Party	Candidate	Votes	%
Union Nationale	Raynald Fréchette	19,915	50.11
Liberal	Carrier Fortin	17,281	43.48
RIN	Denis Brault	1,495	3.76
Ralliement national	Philippe Lord	1,051	2.64
Total valid votes		39,472	98.56
Total rejected ballots		581	1.44
Turnout		40,323	74.58
Electors on the lists		54,064	–

1962 Quebec general election
Party	Candidate	Votes	%
Liberal	Carrier Fortin	18,539	52.46
Union Nationale	Armand Nadeau	16,714	47.30
Action provinciale	Claude Perreault	86	0.24
Total valid votes		35,339	98.56
Total rejected ballots		502	1.40
Turnout		35,841	81.29
Electors on the lists		44,089	–

1960 Quebec general election
Party	Candidate	Votes	%
Liberal	Louis-Philippe Brousseau	17,661	51.02
Union Nationale	John Samuel Bourque	16,265	46.98
Independent UN	Charles Lemieux	692	2.00
Total valid votes		34,618	99.20
Total rejected ballots		279	0.80
Turnout		34,897	84.11
Electors on the lists		41,489	–

1956 Quebec general election
Party	Candidate	Votes	%
Union Nationale	John Samuel Bourque	16,588	55.30
Liberal	Gérard Bédard	13,150	43.84
Labor–Progressive	Alfred Bilodeau	185	0.62
Co-operative Commonwealth	Paul-Émile Jutras	73	0.24
Total valid votes		29,996	98.92
Total rejected ballots		328	1.08
Turnout		30,324	78.62
Electors on the lists		38,571	–

1952 Quebec general election
Party	Candidate	Votes	%
Union Nationale	John Samuel Bourque	14,905	55.77
Liberal	Jacques Lagassé	11,425	42.75
Co-operative Commonwealth	Squire Blackshaw	395	1.48
Total valid votes		26,725	99.19
Total rejected ballots		217	0.81
Turnout		26,942	74.15
Electors on the lists		36,334	–

1948 Quebec general election
Party	Candidate	Votes	%
Union Nationale	John Samuel Bourque	13,818	57.26
Liberal	Donat Jacques	5,511	22.84
Union des électeurs	Roméo Gauthier	4,525	18.75
Co-operative Commonwealth	Michel Bergeron	278	1.15
Total valid votes		24,132	99.02
Total rejected ballots		240	0.98
Turnout		24,372	77.15
Electors on the lists		31,589	–

1944 Quebec general election
Party	Candidate	Votes	%
Union Nationale	John Samuel Bourque	10,559	52.03
Liberal	Maurice Gingues	6,910	34.05
Bloc populaire	J.-Antoine Rouleau	2,825	13.92
Total valid votes		20,294	98.75
Total rejected ballots		257	1.25
Turnout		20,551	74.64
Electors on the lists		27,534	–

1939 Quebec general election
Party	Candidate	Votes	%
Union Nationale	John Samuel Bourque	3,914	46.90
Liberal	Maurice Gingues	3,816	45.73
Action libérale nationale	J.-Eugène Choquette	615	7.37
Total valid votes		8,345	98.22
Total rejected ballots		151	1.78
Turnout		8,496	75.23
Electors on the lists		11,294	–

1936 Quebec general election
Party	Candidate	Votes	%
Union Nationale	John Samuel Bourque	4,987	60.77
Liberal	Césaire Gervais	3,219	39.23
Total valid votes		8,206	99.65
Total rejected ballots		29	0.35
Turnout		8,235	76.59
Electors on the lists		10,752	–

1935 Quebec general election
Party	Candidate	Votes	%
Action libérale nationale	John Samuel Bourque	4,777	60.68
Liberal	Émery-Hector Fortier	3,096	39.32
Total valid votes		7,873	98.00
Total rejected ballots		161	2.00
Turnout		8,034	75.06
Electors on the lists		10,704	–

1931 Quebec general election
Party	Candidate	Votes	%
Liberal	Émery-Hector Fortier	4,114	52.51
Conservative	Armand-Charles Crépeau	3,720	47.49
Total valid votes		7,834	99.54
Total rejected ballots		36	0.46
Turnout		7,870	76.69
Electors on the lists		10,262	–

1927 Quebec general election
Party	Candidate	Votes	%
Conservative	Armand-Charles Crépeau	3,149	53.45
Liberal	Joseph-Cyrénus Morin	4,114	46.55
Total valid votes		5,892	99.63
Total rejected ballots		22	0.37
Turnout		5,914	71.48
Electors on the lists		8,274	–

Quebec provincial by-election, 1924
Party	Candidate	Votes	%
Conservative	Armand-Charles Crépeau	2,586	52.04
Liberal	Calixte-Émile Therrien	2,383	47.96
Total valid votes		4,969	97.32
Total rejected ballots		137	2.68
Turnout		5,106	67.75
Electors on the lists		7,537	–

1923 Quebec general election
Party	Candidate	Votes	%
Conservative	Moïse O'Bready	2,050	45.92
Liberal	Ludger Forest	1,752	39.25
Liberal	Charles-Clément Cabana	662	14.83
Total valid votes		4,464	98.00
Total rejected ballots		91	2.00
Turnout		4,555	60.44
Electors on the lists		7,537	–

Quebec provincial by-election, 1922
Party	Candidate	Votes
Liberal	Ludger Forest	Acclaimed

1919 Quebec general election
Party	Candidate	Votes
Liberal	Joseph-Henri Lemay	Acclaimed
Electors on the lists		7,411

1916 Quebec general election
Party	Candidate	Votes
Liberal	Calixte-Émile Therrien	Acclaimed
Electors on the lists		6,432

1912 Quebec general election
Party	Candidate	Votes	%
Liberal	Calixte-Émile Therrien	2,377	54.72
Conservative	Féliz-Herménégilde Hébert	1,967	45.28
Total valid votes		4,344	99.20
Total rejected ballots		35	0.80
Turnout		4,379	69.08
Electors on the lists		6,339	–

Quebec provincial by-election, 1911
Party	Candidate	Votes
Liberal	Calixte-Émile Therrien	Acclaimed

1908 Quebec general election
Party	Candidate	Votes
Liberal	Jean-Marie-Joseph-Pantaléon Pelletier	Acclaimed
Electors on the lists		5,270

1904 Quebec general election
Party	Candidate	Votes
Liberal	Jean-Marie-Joseph-Pantaléon Pelletier	Acclaimed
Electors on the lists		4,800

1900 Quebec general election
Party	Candidate	Votes	%
Liberal	Jean-Marie-Joseph-Pantaléon Pelletier	1,662	51.41
Conservative	Louis-Edmond Panneton	1,571	48.59
Total valid votes		3,233	99.08
Total rejected ballots		30	0.92
Turnout		3,263	73.19
Electors on the lists		4,458	–

1897 Quebec general election
Party	Candidate	Votes	%
Conservative	Louis-Edmond Panneton	1,283	62.07
Liberal	Louis-Charles Bélanger	784	37.93
Total valid votes		2,067	98.71
Total rejected ballots		27	1.29
Turnout		2,094	53.78
Electors on the lists		3,894	–

1892 Quebec general election
Party	Candidate	Votes	%
Conservative	Louis-Edmond Panneton	809	35.17
Conservative	Joseph Gibb Robertson	797	34.65
Liberal	John Sidney Broderick	694	30.17
Total valid votes		2,300	99.44
Total rejected ballots		13	0.56
Turnout		2,313	70.97
Electors on the lists		3,259	–

1890 Quebec general election
Party	Candidate	Votes	%
Conservative	Joseph Gibb Robertson	1,071	57.21
Liberal	Louis-Charles Bélanger	801	42.79
Total valid votes		1,872	97.70
Total rejected ballots		44	2.30
Turnout		1,916	61.57
Electors on the lists		3,112	–

1886 Quebec general election
Party	Candidate	Votes
Conservative	Joseph Gibb Robertson	Acclaimed
Electors on the lists		2,092

Quebec provincial by-election, 1884
Party	Candidate	Votes
Conservative	Joseph Gibb Robertson	Acclaimed

1881 Quebec general election
Party	Candidate	Votes
Conservative	Joseph Gibb Robertson	Acclaimed
Electors on the lists		2,054

Quebec provincial by-election, 1879
Party	Candidate	Votes	%
Conservative	Joseph Gibb Robertson	879	78.34
Liberal	Alneas McMaster	243	21.66
Total valid votes		1,122	100.00
Turnout		1,122	54.84
Electors on the lists		2,046	–

1878 Quebec general election
Party	Candidate	Votes
Independent Conservative	Joseph Gibb Robertson	Acclaimed
Electors on the lists		2,037

1875 Quebec general election
Party	Candidate	Votes
Conservative	Joseph Gibb Robertson	Acclaimed
Electors on the lists		1,216

1871 Quebec general election
Party	Candidate	Votes
Conservative	Joseph Gibb Robertson	Acclaimed
Electors on the lists		1,251

Quebec provincial by-election, 1869
Party	Candidate	Votes
Conservative	Joseph Gibb Robertson	Acclaimed

1867 Quebec general election
Party	Candidate	Votes	%
Conservative	Joseph Gibb Robertson	484	56.15
Conservative	Richard William Heneker	378	43.85
Total valid votes		862	100.00
Turnout		862	69.63
Electors on the lists		1,238	–

== See also ==
- List of Quebec provincial electoral districts
- Canadian provincial electoral districts
