= Louis-Edmond Panneton =

Canadian politician

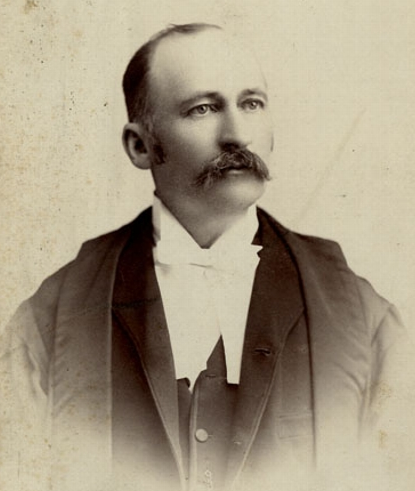

Member of the Legislative Assembly of Quebec for Sherbrooke
- In office 1892–1900
- Preceded by: Joseph Gibb Robertson
- Succeeded by: Pantaléon Pelletier

Personal details
- Born: July 6, 1848 Trois-Rivières, Canada East
- Died: August 5, 1935 (aged 87) Montreal, Quebec
- Party: Conservative

Louis-Edmond Panneton (July 6, 1848 – August 5, 1935) was a lawyer, judge, educator and political figure in Quebec. He represented Sherbrooke in the Legislative Assembly of Quebec from 1892 to 1900 as a Conservative.

He was born in Trois-Rivières, Canada East, the son of André Panneton and Marie Blondin, and was educated at the Séminaire de Trois-Rivières. Panneton was admitted to the Quebec bar in 1870 and set up practice in Sherbrooke. In 1886, he married Corinne, the daughter of Louis-Trefflé Dorais. He was mayor of Sherbrooke in 1888. In 1899, Panneton was named Queen's Counsel. He was defeated in 1900 when he ran for reelection to the Quebec assembly and returned to his law practice. Panneton also taught law at Bishop's College. In 1912, he was named to the Quebec Superior Court for Montreal district. He was bâtonnier for Saint-François district in 1886, 1889, 1896, 1898, 1905 and 1907 and bâtonnier for Quebec in 1907 and 1908. He was owner and editor of the journal le Peuple. He also served as president for the Saint-Jean-Baptiste Society at Sherbrooke. Panneton died in Montreal at the age of 86 and was buried in the Notre Dame des Neiges Cemetery.
