= Ludger Forest (Sherbrooke MLA) =

Canadian politician (1877–1943)

Ludger Forest (November 10, 1877 – March 28, 1943) was a dentist and political figure in Quebec. He represented Sherbrooke in the Legislative Assembly of Quebec from 1922 to 1923 as a Liberal.

He was born in Wotton, Quebec, the son of Isaïe Forest and Hortense Fortier, and was educated at the Séminaire Saint-Charles-Borromée in Sherbrooke and the Université Laval. Forest was a dentist in Sherbrooke. From 1914 to 1917, he was president of the College of Dentists for Quebec. He served on the town council for Sherbrooke from 1913 to 1922. He was elected in a 1922 by-election. Forest was defeated when he ran for reelection in 1923. In 1926, he married Marie-Emma Benoît. Forest was mayor of Sherbrooke in 1932 and 1933. He died in Sherbrooke at the age of 65.

His uncle Ludger Forest also served in the Quebec assembly.
