= Richard Dalby Morkill =

Canadian politician

Richard Dalby Morkill was the mayor of Sherbrooke, Quebec, Canada, from 27 January 1873 to 20 January 1875.
