= Andrew Robertson (lawyer) =

Andrew Robertson, QC (1815 – 21 March 1880) was a lawyer and author of legal works.

Robertson emigrated from the United States with his family at the age of 17 and they spent considerable time there before moving north to Sherbrooke, Quebec. He, along with two brothers, pursued careers in the legal profession. He practiced law with both brothers at various times in Montreal and had a prosperous career. Also, he attained an appointment as Queen's Counsel in 1864. At that time he began producing some important legal works. For example, with Judge Joseph-Ubalde Beaudry he compiled the Lower Canada Reports/Décisions des tribunaux du Bas-Canada, an important reference work for legal precedents.

Robertson was a governor of McGill University and left part of his estate to the library at the Faculty of Law.
