= Jacques-Cartier, Sherbrooke =

Coordinates: 45.4051°N 71.9385°W

Jacques-Cartier
- Borough
- Borough of Sherbrooke
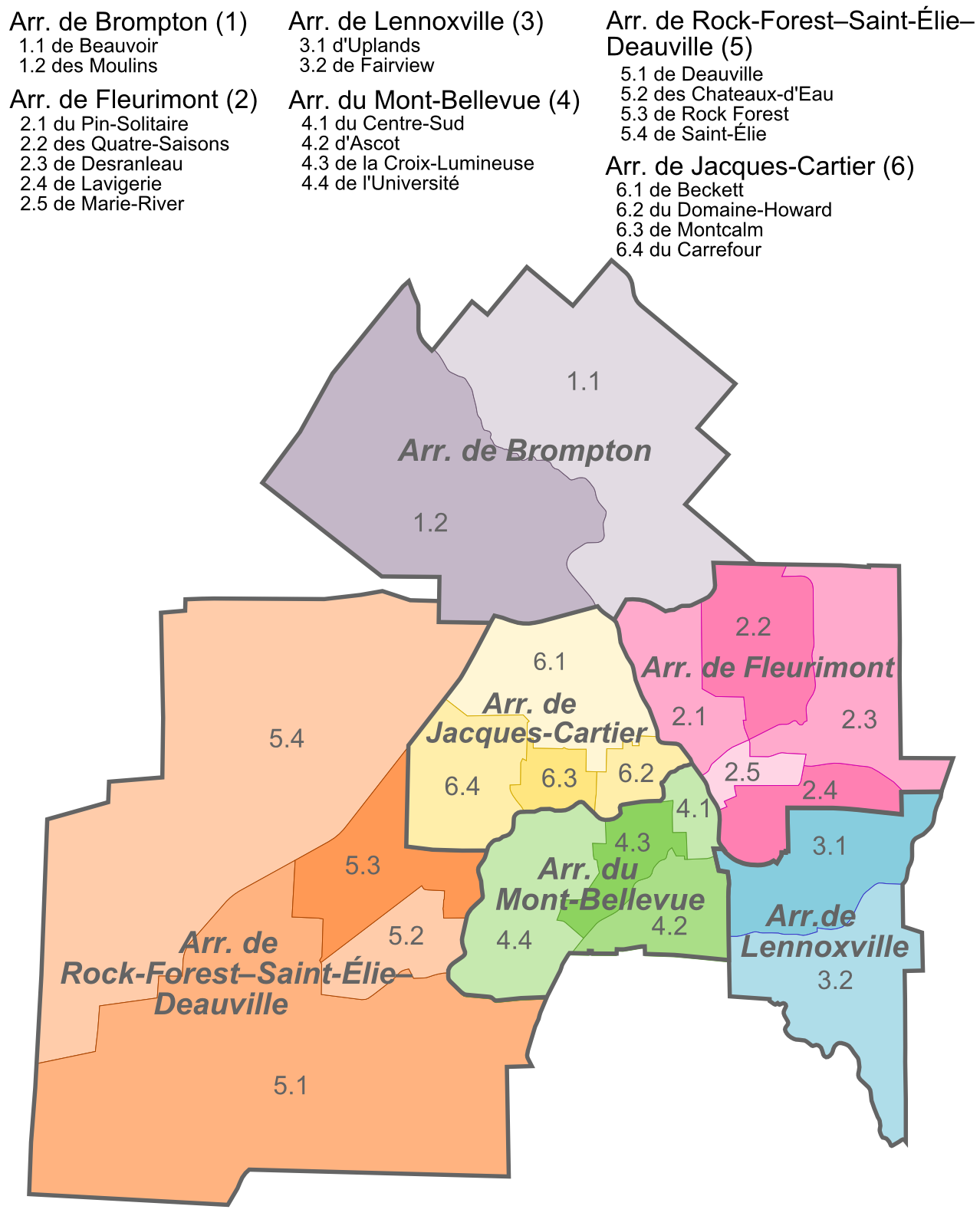
- Country: Canada
- Province: Quebec
- Region: Estrie
- RCM: Sherbrooke
- Merged: January 1, 2002

Government
  - City councillors: Marc Denault; Christine Ouellet; Chantal L'Espérance; Pierre Tardif

Area
  - Land: 30.5 km^{2} (11.8 sq mi)

Population (2009)
  - Total: 32,555
  - Density: 1,067.37/km^{2} (2,764.5/sq mi)
- Time zone: UTC-5 (EST)
- Area code: 819
- Website: Borough of Jacques-Cartier

Jacques-Cartier (French pronunciation: [ʒak kaʁtje]) is a former arrondissement, or borough, of the city of Sherbrooke, Quebec. The borough comprises the portion of pre-amalgamation Sherbrooke located north of the Magog River. It contains the Carrefour de l'Estrie shopping centre and the Bois Beckett Park, one of few old-growth forests in the region.

The borough had a population of 32,555 in 2009.

== Government ==
The borough is represented by four councillors on the Sherbrooke City Council. Its current councillors are Chantal L'Espérance, Marc Denault, Nathalie Goguen and Pierre Tardif.
