= Coat of arms of Sherbrooke =

- Armiger: Sherbrooke
- Adopted: 1953
- Crest: A wall crown of seven golden towers;
- Shield: Or in the meadow eleven azure charged in chief with two thunderbolts Argent and in point with a lance Or surmounted by a wheel Argent the pair accompanied in chief with a rose in gules and in flanks two fleurdelys azur;
- Supporters: Two vert palms crossed at the point

The coat of arms of Sherbrooke is the full heraldic achievement representing the city of Sherbrooke. It was adopted in 1953 and is visible on the unofficial city flag.

== Symbolism ==
The mural crown, which serves as the crest, represents Sherbrooke being the queen of Estrie the region in which it is located. On the escutcheon, the fleur de lys represents the French and the rose the English. The thunderbolts symbolise the city being a major electricity producer and therefore its nickname ″The city of electricity″ The lance evokes St-Michel, the patron of the cathedral. The six-point wheel comes from the arms of the family of Sir John Sherbrooke which the city is named after. The motto ″Ne Quid Nimis″ is the same one that the family of Sir John Sherbrooke used. The ″Y″ at the center of the shield symbolizes the geographical situation of Sherbrooke at the intersection of the Magog and Saint-François river. The two palms evoke the numerous parks in the city.

== History ==
The coat of arms were designed by the Drouin Institute of Montreal and adopted in 1953 following the incapability of the old heraldic achievement to represent the city.

== Blazon ==
Arms: Or in the meadow eleven azure charged in chief with two thunderbolts Argent and in point with a lance Or surmounted by a wheel Argent the pair accompanied in chief with a rose in gules and in flanks two fleurdelys azur;

Crest: A wall crown of seven golden towers;

Supporters: Two vert palms crossed at the point;

== Use ==
The coat of arms are present on the unofficial city flag which consists of the heraldic achievement with the word ″SHERBROOKE″ in allcaps the all in a white background. The coat of arms are also visible in front of the city-hall remade with flowers.

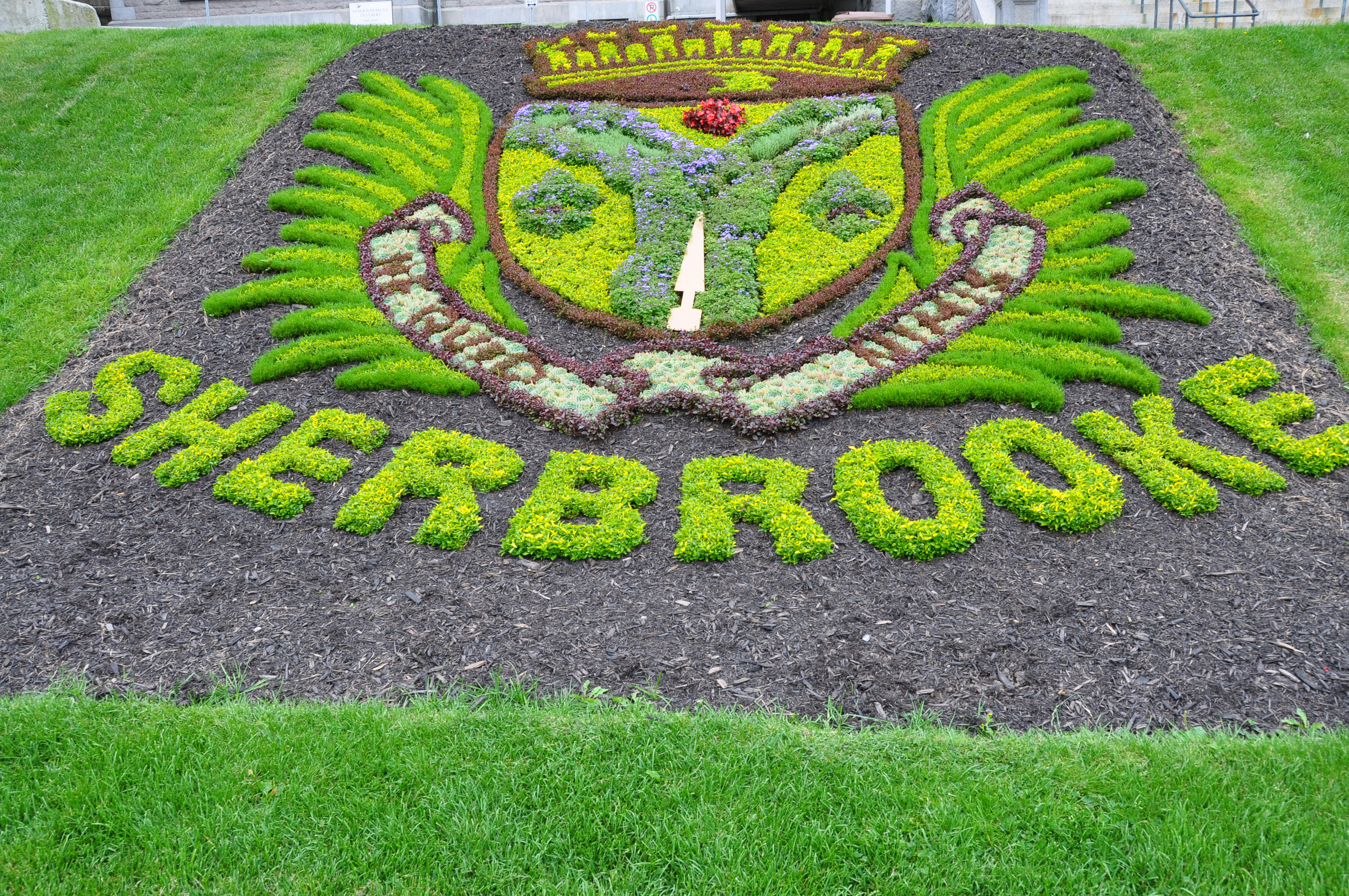
Coat of arms at the city-hall

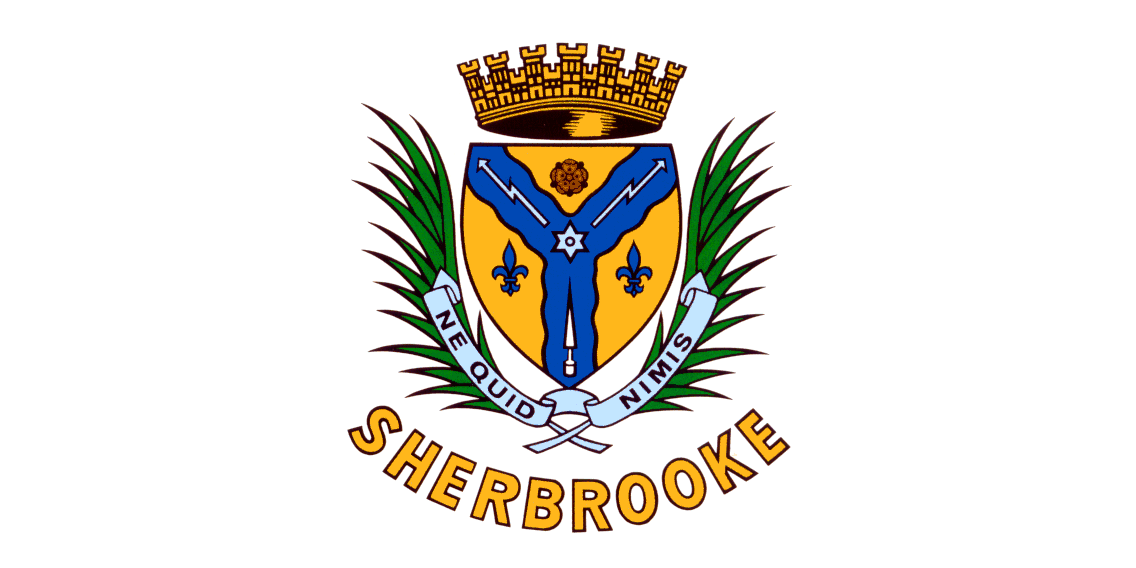
Flag of Sherbrooke
