= Jacques-Cartier Park (Sherbrooke) =

Park in Sherbrooke, Quebec, Canada

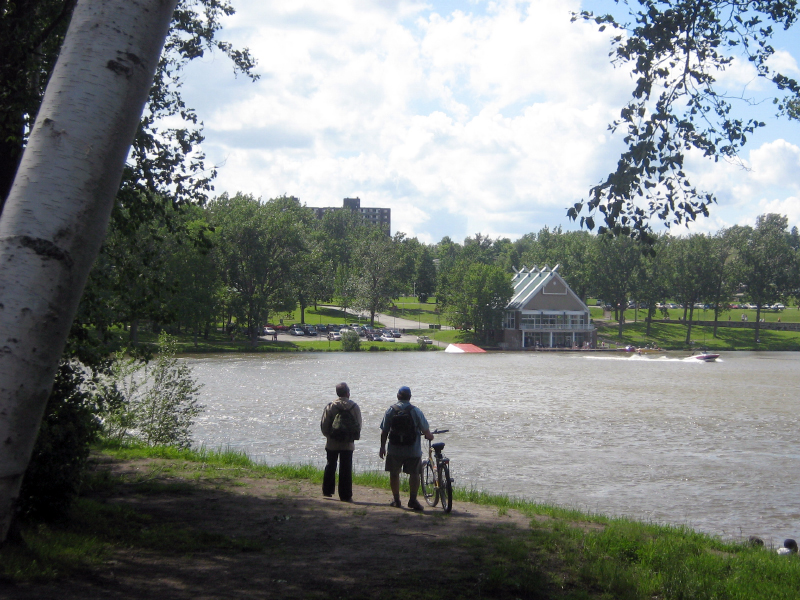
- Interactive map of Jacques-Cartier Park
- Location: Sherbrooke, Quebec, Canada
- Coordinates: 45°23′42″N 71°54′33″W
- Created: 1930s
- Operator: City of Sherbrooke

Jacques-Cartier Park is a park located in Sherbrooke, Quebec, along the shore of Lac des Nations.

== History ==
Created in the 1930s by the clergy as part of the Œuvre des terrains de jeux (OTJ), the park was intended to supervise and organize recreational activities for children.

By the mid-20th century, the site included two separate beaches for men and women, as well as facilities for regattas and canoeing. In the 1960s, the adjacent body of water became an important location for water skiing.

The park was officialised by the Commission on Toponomy of Quebec in 1989. Now integrated into the Lac des Nations promenade network, Jacques-Cartier Park remains a central and heavily frequented green space in downtown Sherbrooke.

In 2024, the Sherbrooke City Council approved the construction of a pump track at Jacques-Cartier Park. Construction began in July 2025. The pump track was opened to the public on May 9, 2026 and is the longest pump track in all of Quebec.

== See also ==
- Boisé-Fabi
- Mont Bellevue Park
