= Société de transport de Sherbrooke =

- Headquarters: 895, rue Cabana; Sherbrooke, Quebec; J1K 2M3
- Service type: Bus service, paratransit
- Routes: 41
- Hubs: 3
- Website: www.sts.qc.ca (in French)

Société de transport de Sherbrooke (STS) provides public transit services to Sherbrooke, the only major city in the Eastern Townships (Estrie) region of Quebec, Canada. After the amalgamation of what are now neighbouring boroughs into a regional municipality in 2002, service was expanded to cover the entire city with 41 routes and a fleet of more than 80 buses. STS is owned and operated by the city.

== Bus services ==
=== Regular routes ===
No.	Route Description	Route Schedule
1	Carrefour de l'Estrie / Station du Cégep <> Bowen - Talbot	7 days (Carrefour de l'Estrie weekdays only)
2	Station du Cégep <> Bishop's University	7 days
3	Carrefour de l'Estrie <> 13e Avenue - 24-Juin	7 days
4	Carrefour de l'Estrie <> Galvin - Allard	7 days
5	Station du Cégep <> 13e Avenue - du 24-Juin	7 days
6	Université de Sherbrooke <> Lisieux - Lachine	7 days
7	CHUS–Fleurimont <> André / Hallée	7 days
8	CHUS–Fleurimont <> Université de Sherbrooke	7 days
9	Université de Sherbrooke / Station du Cégep <> Des Chardonnerets	7 days
11	Plateau Saint-Joseph <> Bishop's University / André - Thibault	7 days
12	Carrefour de l'Estrie <> Station du Cégep	7 days
13	Raby Normand > Université de Sherbrooke	weekdays (during Fall and Winter semesters of U de S)
14	Université de Sherbrooke <> Station du Cégep	7 days
15	Université de Sherbrooke <> Parc Lucien-Blanchard	7 days
16	Université de Sherbrooke <> Ontario - Prospect	7 days
17	Station du Cégep / Carrefour de l'Estrie <> Place Dussault	7 days (Station du Cégep weekdays only)
18	Université de Sherbrooke <> Bourassa - Frontière	7 days
19	Station du Cégep <> Lisieux-Brûlé	weekdays, no evening service
51	Station du Cégep <> Kruger	7 days, minibus on week-ends

=== Minibus routes ===
No.	Route Description	Route Schedule
20	Station du Cégep <> Saint-François - Boulogne	rush hour, midday
22	CHUS–Fleurimont <> Place Fleurimont <> Galvin	rush hour fixed route (on-demand service also available weekdays between 9:00am and 3:30pm)
23	Place Fleurimont <> Virginie-Laflamme / Parrot	rush hour fixed route (on-demand service also available weekdays between 9:00am and 3:30pm)
24	Université de Sherbrooke <> De Lotbinière	7 days
26	Carrefour de l'Estrie <> Robert-Boyd - Portland	rush hour
27	Université de Sherbrooke <> Val-du-Lac	rush hour, midday
28	Bishop's University <> Alexander-Galt / Beattie / Atto	rush hour
29	Université de Sherbrooke <> Station du Dépôt	night (during Fall and Winter semesters of U de S)
36	Carrefour de l'Estrie <> Plaza de l'Ouest	weekdays
50	Carrefour de l'Estrie <> Val-des-Arbres - Laliberté	7 days
55	Du Manoir <> 13e Avenue - 24-Juin	7 days, no evening service
57	Carrefour de l'Estrie <> 13e Avenue - 24-Juin	7 days, no evening service

=== Microbus routes ===
No.	Route Description	Route Schedule
21	CHUS–Fleurimont <> Place Fleurimont	rush hour
25	13e Avenue – 24-Juin <> Gîte du Bel Âge / Champêtre / Coquelicots	rush hour
52	Terrasses Rock Forest <> Avenue du Parc	rush hour

=== Express routes ===
No.	Route Description	Route Schedule
401	Stationnement Gaspé <> <> CHUS–Fleurimont	rush hour
405	Station du Cégep <> 13e Avenue - 24-Juin	week-end only
411	Carrefour de l'Estrie <> Plateau St-Joseph	7 days
448	Stationnement Northrop-Frye <> IGA Extra - King Ouest	rush hour
449	Stationnement Northrop-Frye <> CHUS–Hôtel-Dieu / St-Vincent-de-Paul	rush hour
453	Université de Sherbrooke <> Campus de la Santé	rush hour, midday
454	Stationnement Northrop-Frye <> CHUS–Fleurimont	rush hour

=== On-demand service (TAD) ===
No.	Route Description	Route Schedule
770	Chemin de Saint-Élie <> Parc de la Butte-aux-Bouleaux	rush hour
774	Saint-Roch Sud - Émery-Fontaine <> Lotbinière - North-Hatley	rush hour
780	Val-Des-Arbres Caleb <> Hémond	rush hour

=== Specials routes ===
Specials Routes are in service 7 days a week, in the early morning or late evening, as a way to serve all the lines with fewer buses. Specials routes' frequency may vary from once a day to once per hour.

No.	Route Description	Route Schedule
903	Carrefour de l'Estrie <> Station du Dépôt	7 days, late evening Serves line 3 and 26
904	Carrefour de l'Estrie <> 13e Avenue - 24-Juin	7 days, early morning, late evening Serves line 1, 4 and 9 In service from 7pm on week-ends
907	André - Thibault <> Carrefour de l'Estrie	Early morning Weekdays
908	Station du Dépôt <> CHUS–Fleurimont	7 days, late evenings Serves line 5 and 8
912	Carrefour de l'Estrie <> Station du Dépôt	7 days early morning, late evenings Serves line 12 and 16
913	Station du Dépôt <> Galt - Lisieux	7 days, late evening Serves line 3, 6 and 12
917	Rock Forest <> Carrefour de l'Estrie & Station du Cégep Weekdays only	7 days, early morning Serves line 17 and 18
918	Université de Sherbrooke <> Rock Forest	7 days, late evening Serves line 17 and 18
919	Lisieux-Brûlé <> Station du Cégep	Weekdays, early morning Serves line 6, 14 and 19

== Transfer Points ==
Three points in the city are used for transfers between buses. At the corner of King and Sauvé streets in the Rock Forest sector, routes 17 and 18 are waiting for each other, every time.

- Cégep: 1, 2, 3, 4, 5, 7, 9, 12, 14, 17, 19, 20, 51, 55, 405
- Université de Sherbrooke: 6, 8, 9, 11, 14, 15, 16, 18, 24, 27, 29, 453
- Carrefour de l'Estrie: 1, 3, 4, 11, 12, 17, 26, 36, 50, 55, 57, 411, 453

== History ==
Chronology:

1897: Sherbrooke Street Railway Company
1910: Sherbrooke Railway and Power Company
1914: Sherbrooke City Transit Company Limited - began first bus service in 1928.
1952: Voyageur and Service Laramée Inc.
1962: Sherbrooke Transit Inc. - acquired by CMTS
1978: Corporation municipale de transport de Sherbrooke
1985: Corporation métropolitaine de transport de Sherbrooke (CMTS) - extended service to neighbouring towns
2002: Société de transport de Sherbrooke - changed name with the amalgamation into a regional municipality.
