= Lac des Nations =

- Le lac des mitaines
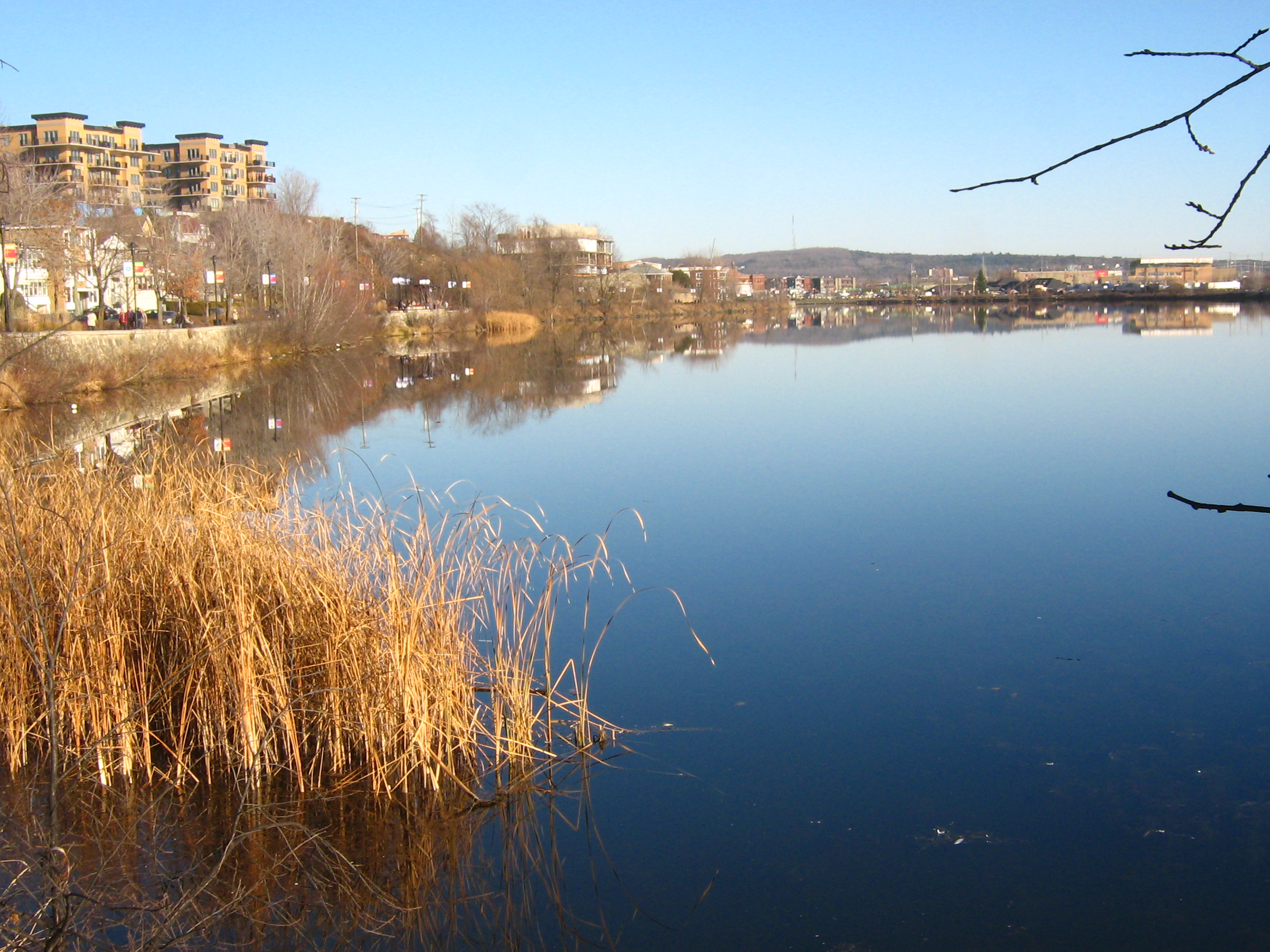

- Location within Quebec
- Location: Sherbrooke, Quebec, Canada
- Coordinates: 45°23′47″N 71°54′27″W
- Type: Artificial lake
- Primary inflows: Magog River
- Primary outflows: Saint François River
- Basin countries: Canada

Lac des Nations is an artificial lake located in Sherbrooke, Quebec, Canada. It was created during the construction of a hydroelectric dam used to power the old Patton Co factory.

Fed by the Magog River, it is at the heart of the Cité des Rivières Project, which aims to promote tourism and the revitalization of Sherbrooke's rivers.

Crossed by the Central Maine and Quebec Railway (a piece of the pre-1994 Canadian Pacific line to Saint John, New Brunswick), it is bordered by the vast Parc Jacques-Cartier. Lac des Nations is the location of the Jean Perrault Waterskiing school.

Surrounding the Lac des Nations is a promenade. Attractions along the path include the a water fountain, the Halte des Nations, and the Marché de la Gare public market. The Orford Express tourist train stopped near the Marché de la Gare.

The annual Fête du Lac des Nations is located in Jacques-Cartier Park along the lake. Thousands of people attend and dance around a fire with necklaces around their necks.
