= Rock Forest–Saint-Élie–Deauville =

Coordinates: 45°22′17.1″N 71°59′17.5″W

- Borough
- Borough of Sherbrooke
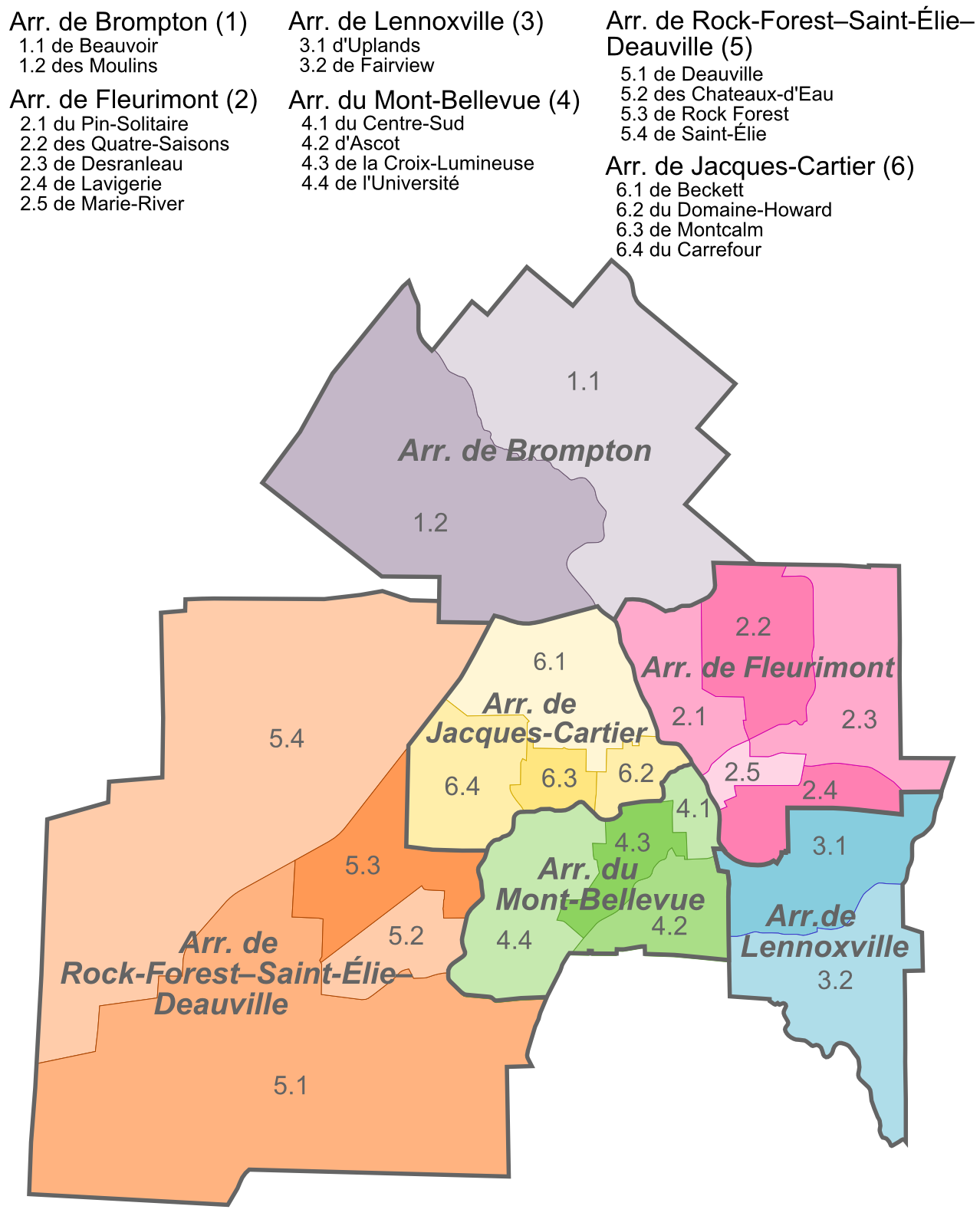
- Country: Canada
- Province: Quebec
- Region: Estrie
- RCM: Sherbrooke
- Merged: January 1, 2002

Government
  - City councillors: Diane Délisle; Annie Godbout; Julien Lachance; Bruno Vachon

Area
  - Land: 156 km^{2} (60 sq mi)

Population (2009)
  - Total: 35,500
  - Density: 227.56/km^{2} (589.4/sq mi)
- Time zone: UTC-5 (EST)
- Area code: 819
- Website: Borough of Rock Forest–Saint-Élie–Deauville

Rock Forest–Saint-Élie–Deauville (French pronunciation: [ʁɔk fɔʁɛst sɛ̃t‿eli dovil]) is a former arrondissement, or borough, of the city of Sherbrooke, Quebec.

The borough comprises the formerly independent cities of Rock Forest, Deauville and Saint-Élie-d'Orford, which were annexed into the city of Sherbrooke on January 1, 2002. The borough had a population of 35,500 in 2009.

== Government ==
The borough is represented by four councillors on the Sherbrooke City Council.

== Communities ==
Deauville had a census population of 3,394 in 2006. The population increased by 16.9 percent from 2001 to 2006.

Rock Forest (2006 population 20,693) is located on the Magog River. Its population increased 10.9 percent from 2001 to 2006. The site was first populated by English, Scottish and Irish immigrants during the 19th century, and was given the name "Drop Off" from the spot on the Magog River where a first wooden bridge was built. The name Rock Forest was first used in the 1870s, although it did not become official until the 1920s. It came from the name of the large castle-like residence of one Parker Nagle.

Saint-Élie-d'Orford had a census population of 9,755 in 2006. Its population increased by 19 percent from 2001 to 2006.

The borough also includes the smaller communities of Shanks and Val-du-Lac.

== See also ==
- Boisé-Fabi
