= Éva Senécal =

Québécois poet and novelist (1905-1988)

- Born: April 20, 1905; La Patrie, Quebec
- Died: March 14, 1988 (aged 82); Sherbrooke
- Occupation: Writer
- Writing career
- Language: French
- Notable works: La Course dans l'aurore, Dans les ombres
- Notable awards: Prix Albert-Lévesque, 1931

Éva Senécal (/evɑ senekal/; born April 20, 1905, in La Patrie, Quebec; died March 14, 1988, in Sherbrooke), was a Québécois poet and novelist who worked for the Sherbrooke newspaper, La Tribune.

== Early life and education ==
Senécal had a solitary childhood and attended school at the École normale de Saint Hyacinthe in La Patrie. She contracted tuberculosis in her late teens and her long convalescence afforded time for extensive reading and developing her poetry.

== Career ==
Senécal published her first volume of poetry, Un peu d'angoisse, un peu de fièvre, in 1927. The editor Alfred DesRochers became a supporter of her work, and her success as a poet led to being hired to write for the Sherbrooke newspaper La Tribune from 1930 to 1936 (she later returned to the paper in the mid-1960s). Senécal's novel Dans les ombres generated some controversy when journalist Jules Larivière (Mon magazine) denounced it as having immoral content, but the critical reception was generally warm and the book won the Prix Albert-Lévesque in 1931. Her second novel, Mon Jacques, was published in 1933. Senécal worked as an editor in Montreal in the 1930s, gradually losing interest in writing. Her fragile health remained a barrier in her career. An anthology of Senécal's writing was published in 1987.

== Legacy ==
The city of Sherbrooke's first public library was named for her at the time of its foundation in December 1990.

== Works ==
- 1927, Un peu d'angoisse… Un peu de fièvre, Montréal, La Patrie.
- 1929, La course dans l'aurore, préface de Louis Philippe Robidoux, Sherbrooke, La Tribune.
- 1931, Dans les ombres, Montréal, Albert Lévesque. (Coll. "Romans de la jeune génération")
- 1933, Mon Jacques, Montréal, Albert Lévesque.

== Prizes ==
- 1929 – Poetry prize awarded by l'Action catholique de la jeunesse canadienne (A.C.J.C.), for La Course dans l'aurore
- 1929 – First prize for originality at the Salon des poètes de Lyon, for "Vent du Nord," a poem from La Course dans l'aurore.
- 1931 – Prix Albert-Lévesque, for Dans les ombres
