= Eastern Townships School Board =

English-language school board in Quebec, Canada

Eastern Townships School Board Commission Scolaire Eastern Townships

Location
- Magog, Quebec Eastern Townships Canada

District information
- Chair of the board: Mike Murray
- Director of education: André Turcotte
- Schools: 20 Elementary, 3 Secondary, 1 Alternative Secondary, 2 Vocational Training Centres, 2 Adult Education Centres

Students and staff
- Students: 6,000 (2012-13)

Other information
- Website: www.etsb.qc.ca

The Eastern Townships School Board, also known as the Commission Scolaire Eastern Townships, is an anglophone school board covering the Eastern Townships in the Canadian province of Quebec. As of 2010, it oversees twenty elementary schools, three high schools, and a learning centre.

== Schools ==
=== Elementary schools ===
- Asbestos-Danville-Shipton (ADS) Elementary School (Danville)
- Ayer's Cliff Elementary School (Ayer's Cliff)
- Butler Elementary School (Bedford)
- Cookshire Elementary School (Cookshire-Eaton)
- Drummondville Elementary School (Drummondville)
- Farnham Elementary School (Farnham)
- Heroes' Memorial Elementary School (Cowansville)
- Knowlton Academy (Brome Lake)
- Lennoxville Elementary School (Sherbrooke)
- Mansonville Elementary School (Mansonville)
- North Hatley Elementary School (North Hatley)
- Parkview Elementary School (Granby)
- Pope Memorial Elementary School (Bury)
- Princess Elizabeth Elementary School (Magog)
- Sawyerville Elementary School (Sawyerville)
- Sherbrooke Elementary School (Sherbrooke)
- St. Francis Elementary School (Richmond)
- Sunnyside Elementary School (Stanstead)
- Sutton Elementary School (Sutton)
- Waterloo Elementary School (Waterloo)

=== High schools ===
- Alexander Galt Regional High School (Sherbrooke)
- Massey-Vanier High School (Cowansville)
- Richmond Regional High School (Richmond)

== See also ==
- Riverside School Board
- New Frontiers School Board
