= Sherbrooke =

- City
- Ville de Sherbrooke
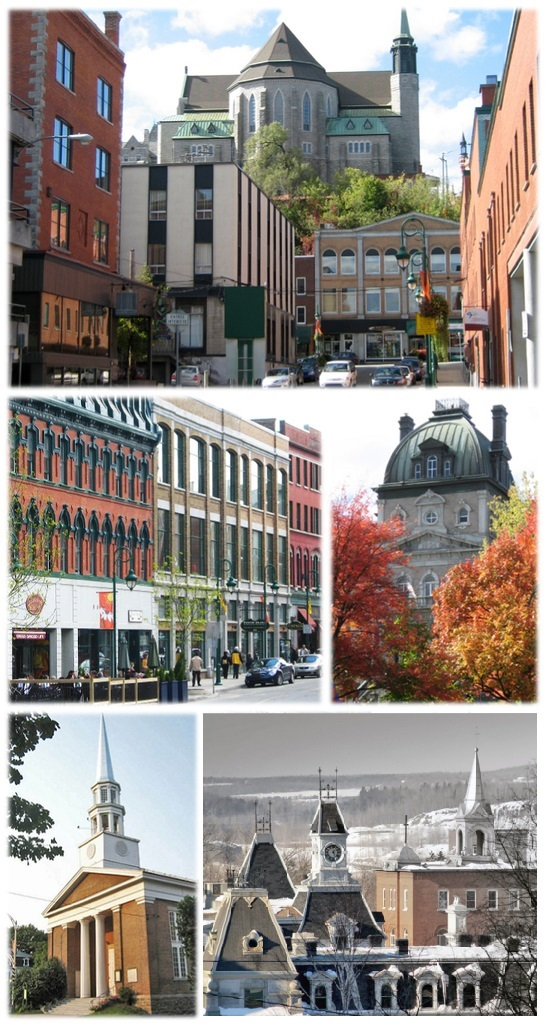
- From top, left to right: Downtown Sherbrooke, Wellington Street, Sherbrooke City Hall, Plymouth-Trinity United Church, clock tower at the Sherbrooke History Museum

- Flag Coat of arms Logo
- Nickname: Queen of the Eastern Townships
- Motto: Ne quid nimis
- Location of Sherbrooke in southern Quebec Sherbrooke (Quebec) Sherbrooke (Canada)
- Coordinates: 45°24′N 71°54′W
- Country: Canada
- Province: Quebec
- Region: Estrie
- RCM: None
- Settled: 1793
- Constituted: 1 January 2002
- Boroughs: List: Brompton; Fleurimont; Jacques-Cartier; Lennoxville; Mont-Bellevue; Rock Forest–Saint-Élie–Deauville

Government
  - Type: Sherbrooke City Council
  - Mayor: Marie-Claude Bibeau
  - Federal riding: Compton—Stanstead / Sherbrooke
  - Prov. riding: Richmond / Saint-François / Sherbrooke

Area
  - City: 367.10 km^{2} (141.74 sq mi)
  - Land: 353.40 km^{2} (136.45 sq mi)
  - Urban: 109.25 km^{2} (42.18 sq mi)
  - Metro: 1,458.10 km^{2} (562.98 sq mi)
- Highest elevation: 378 m (1,240 ft)
- Lowest elevation: 128 m (420 ft)

Population (2021)
  - City: 172,950
  - Rank: 6th in Quebec
  - Density: 489.4/km^{2} (1,268/sq mi)
  - Urban: 155,019
  - Urban density: 1,418.9/km^{2} (3,675/sq mi)
  - Metro: 227,398 (19th)
  - Metro density: 156/km^{2} (400/sq mi)
  - Pop 2016–2021: ▲7.2%
  - Dwellings: 86,019
- Time zone: UTC−05:00 (EST)
  - Summer (DST): UTC−04:00 (EDT)
- Postal code(s): J1C to J1R
- Area code: 819
- NTS Map: 21E5 Sherbrooke
- GNBC Code: EIDHN
- GDP (Sherbrooke CMA): CA$8.0 billion (2016)
- GDP per capita (Sherbrooke CMA): CA$37,797 (2016)
- Website: www.sherbrooke.ca/en

Sherbrooke (/ˈʃɜːrbrʊk/ SHUR-bruuk, Quebec French: [ʃɛʁˈbʁʊk]) is a city in southern Quebec, Canada. It is at the confluence of the Saint-François and Magog rivers in the heart of the Estrie administrative region. The city is coextensive with a territory equivalent to a regional county municipality (TE) and census division (CD) of the same name. With 172,950 residents at the Canada 2021 Census, it is the sixth-largest city in the province and the 30th-largest in Canada. The Sherbrooke Census Metropolitan Area had 227,398 inhabitants, making it the fourth-largest metropolitan area in Quebec and 19th in Canada.

Sherbrooke is the primary economic, political, cultural, and institutional centre of Estrie, and was given its nickname as the Queen of the Eastern Townships at the beginning of the 20th century.

There are eight educational institutions in the city educating 40,000 students and employing 11,000 people, 3,700 of whom are professors, teachers and researchers. The direct economic effect of these institutions exceeds one billion dollars. The proportion of university students is 10.32 students per 100 inhabitants, giving Sherbrooke the largest concentration of students in Quebec.

Sherbrooke rose as a manufacturing centre in the 1800s, and today the service sector is prominent.

The Sherbrooke region is surrounded by mountains, rivers, and lakes. There are several ski hills nearby and various regional tourist attractions. Mont-Bellevue Park, a large park in the city, is used for downhill skiing.

The city was named in 1818 for John Coape Sherbrooke, a governor general of British North America.

== History ==
First Nations settled the region between 8,000 and 3,000 years ago. The Abenaki called it Ktinékétolékouac/Kchi Nikitawtegwak ('the large forks'), or Shacewanteku (where one smokes).

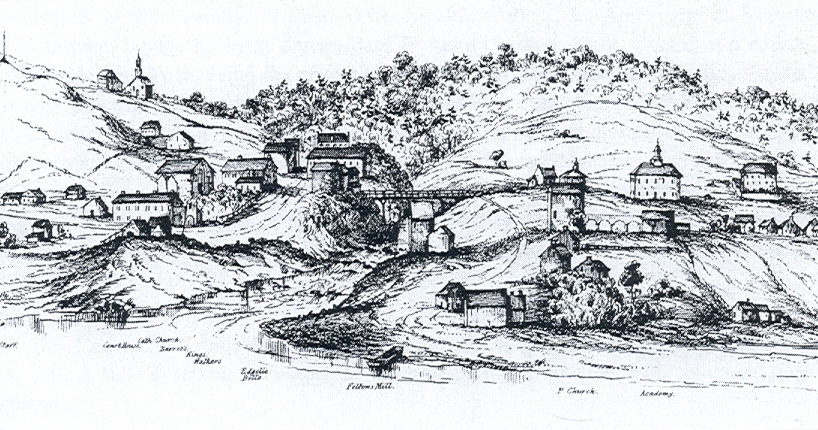
Sherbrooke in 1828

The first non-native settler was the farmer Jean-Baptiste Nolain, in 1779. The area was first surveyed in 1792. Americans from Vermont built mills in the area in 1802. Gilbert Hyatt led a group of loyalists, who settled around 1803. He dammed the Magog River and a gristmill and a sawmill were soon built nearby. The settlement was then known as Hyatt's Mills.

The first immigrants from England arrived in 1815. The British American Land Company was formed in 1832 to acquire and develop almost 1,100,000 acres (1,719 sq mi; 4,452 km^{2}) of Crown land and other lands in the area. It prioritized speculation over immigration.

In 1852 a railway linked Montreal and Portland, Maine via Sherbrooke. By the 1890s, there were rail connections to Boston, Halifax, and New York City.

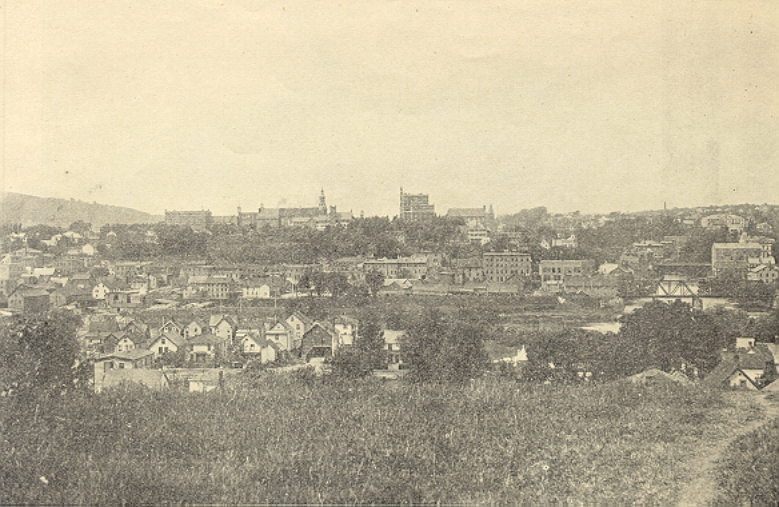
Sherbrooke in 1889

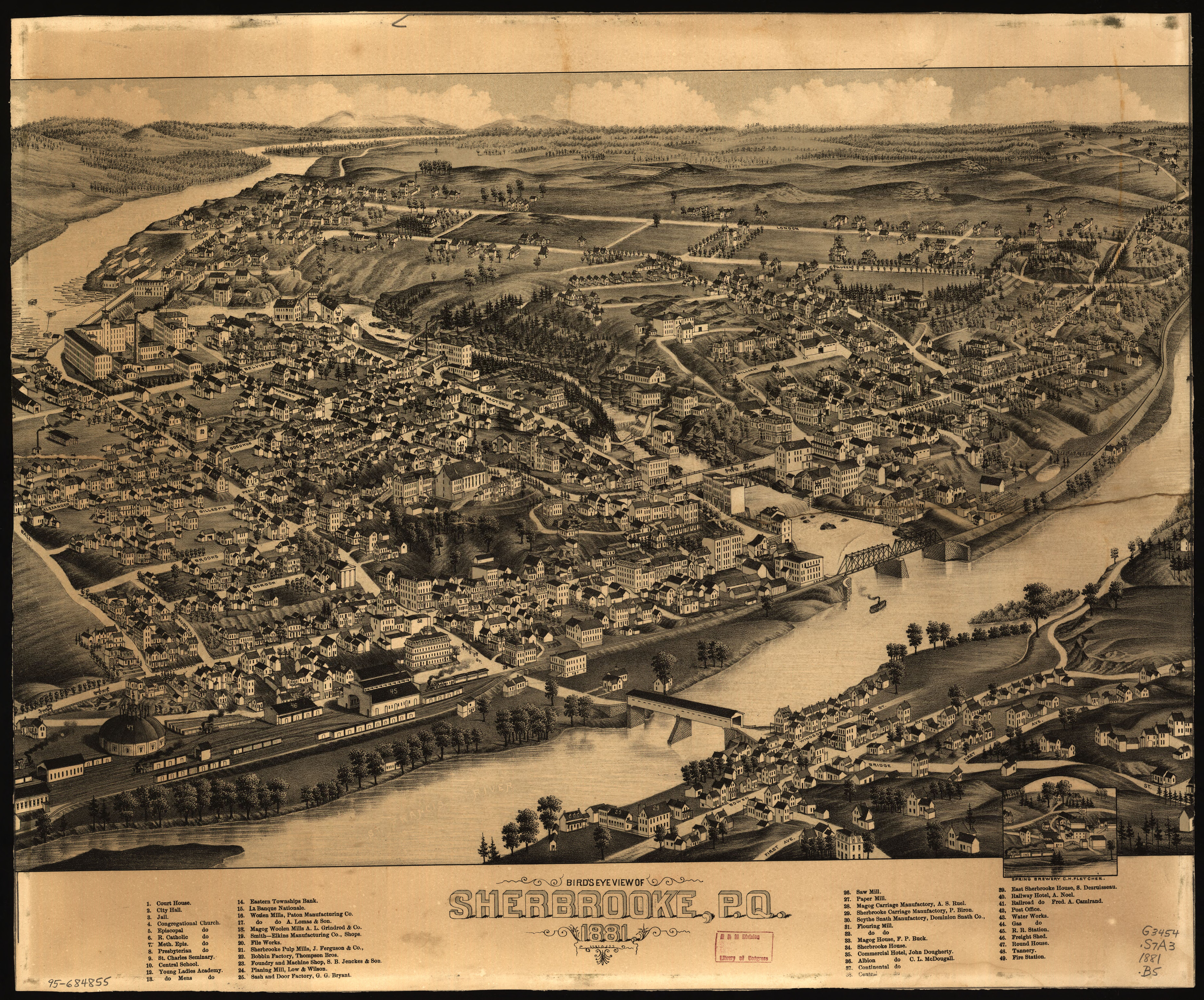
Pictorial map of Sherbrooke from 1881, including a list of landmarks

Immigration from the rest of Quebec began in 1850, and by 1871 francophones were in the majority.

By the turn of the 20th century, Sherbrooke was a thriving industrial city, with manufacturing benefiting from locally-produced hydroelectricity. From the 1950s, some the steel and textile industries declined, giving way to government services and education.

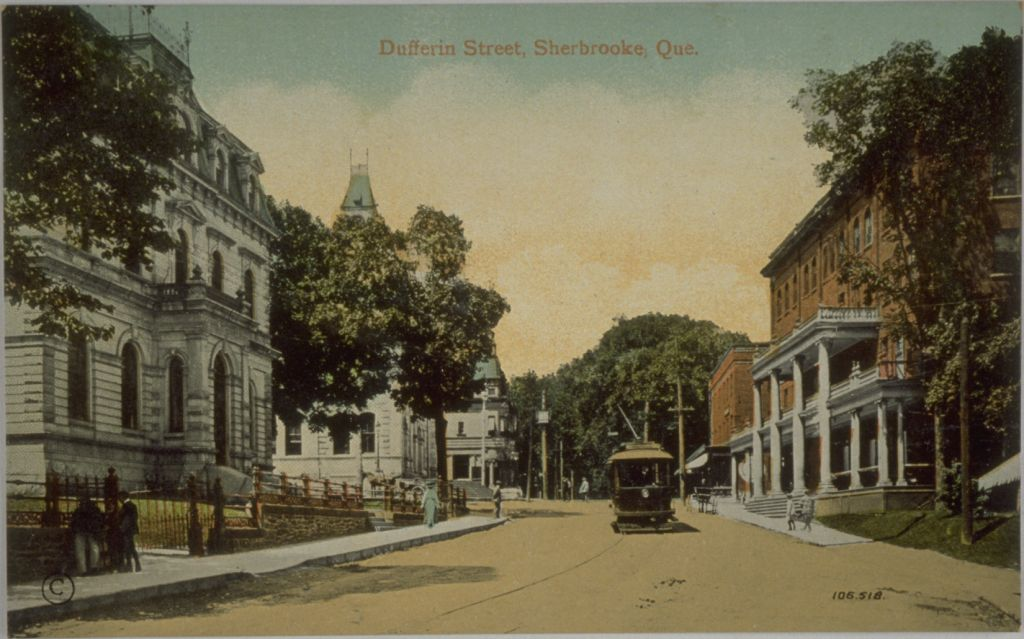
Dufferin Street, Sherbrooke, between 1903–1913

As part of the 2000–2006 municipal reorganization in Quebec, the city grew considerably on 1 January 2002, when it absorbed Ascot, Bromptonville, Deauville, Fleurimont, Lennoxville, Rock Forest, and Saint-Élie-d'Orford. Part of Stoke was also annexed to the newly expanded Sherbrooke.

In 2012, a local biochemical factory suffered an explosion, which killed 2, and injured 19, some severely. A large toxic cloud enveloped part of the city, raising health concerns.

== Geography ==
Located at the confluence of the Saint-François (St. Francis) and Magog rivers in the heart of the Eastern Townships and the Estrie administrative region. Sherbrooke is also the name of a territory equivalent to a regional county municipality (TE) and census division (CD) of Quebec, coextensive with the city of Sherbrooke. Its geographical code is 43.

=== Climate ===
Sherbrooke has a humid continental climate (Köppen Dfb), with long, cold, and snowy winters, warm summers, and short but crisp springs and autumns. Highs range from −5.8 °C (21.6 °F) in January to 24.6 °C (76.3 °F) in July. In an average year, there are 34 nights at or colder than −20 °C (−4 °F), and 6.5 nights at or colder than −30 °C (−22 °F); 4.1 days will see highs reaching 30 °C (86 °F). Annual snowfall is large, averaging at 287 centimetres (113 in), sometimes falling in May and October. Precipitation is not sparse any time of the year, but is the greatest in summer and fall and at its least from January to April, totalling 1,100 millimetres (43.3 in) annually.

The highest temperature ever recorded in Sherbrooke was 36.7 °C (98 °F) on 1 and 2 July 1931. The coldest temperature ever recorded was −41.2 °C (−42.2 °F) on 15 January 2004.

Climate data for Sherbrooke Airport, 1981−2010 normals, extremes 1900−present
Month	Jan	Feb	Mar	Apr	May	Jun	Jul	Aug	Sep	Oct	Nov	Dec	Year
Record high humidex	17.4	17.1	27.0	31.5	38.3	43.9	46.5	43.4	38.7	31.8	26.3	19.0	46.5
Record high °C (°F)	15.0 (59.0)	17.1 (62.8)	25.3 (77.5)	30.0 (86.0)	33.5 (92.3)	35.0 (95.0)	36.7 (98.1)	36.1 (97.0)	34.0 (93.2)	28.3 (82.9)	23.9 (75.0)	17.8 (64.0)	36.7 (98.1)
Mean daily maximum °C (°F)	−5.8 (21.6)	−2.8 (27.0)	2.3 (36.1)	10.4 (50.7)	18.3 (64.9)	22.2 (72.0)	24.6 (76.3)	23.7 (74.7)	19.2 (66.6)	12.2 (54.0)	5.1 (41.2)	−2.1 (28.2)	10.6 (51.1)
Daily mean °C (°F)	−11.9 (10.6)	−9.4 (15.1)	−3.7 (25.3)	4.5 (40.1)	11.4 (52.5)	15.5 (59.9)	18.2 (64.8)	17.3 (63.1)	12.3 (54.1)	6.3 (43.3)	0.6 (33.1)	−7.3 (18.9)	4.5 (40.1)
Mean daily minimum °C (°F)	−17.9 (−0.2)	−15.9 (3.4)	−9.7 (14.5)	−1.4 (29.5)	4.3 (39.7)	8.8 (47.8)	11.7 (53.1)	10.8 (51.4)	6.3 (43.3)	0.5 (32.9)	−4 (25)	−12.4 (9.7)	−1.6 (29.1)
Record low °C (°F)	−41.2 (−42.2)	−40 (−40)	−35 (−31)	−21.1 (−6.0)	−6.7 (19.9)	−2.2 (28.0)	0.5 (32.9)	−1.7 (28.9)	−7.4 (18.7)	−15 (5)	−25.5 (−13.9)	−39.4 (−38.9)	−41.2 (−42.2)
Record low wind chill	−47.2	−48	−42.4	−29.7	−12.8	−5.4	0.0	−4.7	−8.6	−16.7	−27.9	−48.3	−48.3
Average precipitation mm (inches)	74.3 (2.93)	61.7 (2.43)	71.3 (2.81)	84.0 (3.31)	94.3 (3.71)	108.4 (4.27)	109.5 (4.31)	126.1 (4.96)	94.8 (3.73)	90.4 (3.56)	99.1 (3.90)	86.5 (3.41)	1,100.4 (43.32)
Average rainfall mm (inches)	17.3 (0.68)	16.6 (0.65)	27.6 (1.09)	63.3 (2.49)	94.0 (3.70)	108.4 (4.27)	109.5 (4.31)	126.1 (4.96)	94.7 (3.73)	87.5 (3.44)	70.8 (2.79)	32.0 (1.26)	847.9 (33.38)
Average snowfall cm (inches)	68.2 (26.9)	54.2 (21.3)	48.2 (19.0)	21.2 (8.3)	0.37 (0.15)	0.0 (0.0)	0.0 (0.0)	0.0 (0.0)	0.03 (0.01)	3.2 (1.3)	29.1 (11.5)	62.1 (24.4)	286.5 (112.8)
Average precipitation days (≥ 0.2 mm)	19.7	15.5	16.0	14.9	15.7	15.2	14.0	13.3	12.6	14.0	17.2	19.1	187.1
Average rainy days (≥ 0.2 mm)	3.5	3.3	6.4	12.2	15.1	15.1	13.8	14.5	13.0	13.7	11.5	5.4	127.5
Average snowy days (≥ 0.2 cm)	18.9	14.3	10.9	5.6	0.21	0.0	0.0	0.0	0.07	1.5	8.6	16.2	76.3
Mean monthly sunshine hours	84.5	107.8	137.7	159.8	212.3	234.6	257.0	231.3	165.6	118.9	67.9	67.6	1,844.9
Percentage possible sunshine	29.8	36.9	37.4	39.5	46.1	50.1	54.2	52.9	43.9	34.9	23.7	24.8	39.5
Source: Environment Canada

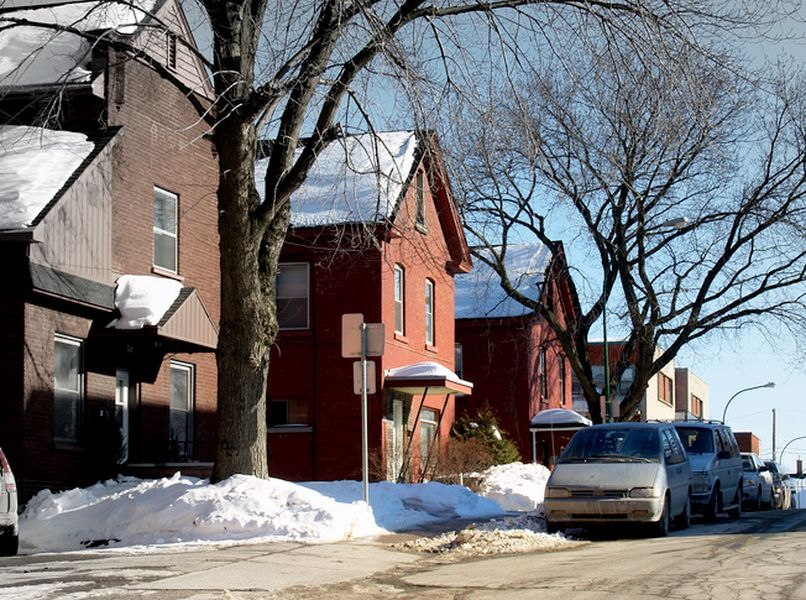
Gordon Street

=== Neighbourhoods ===
The city includes several neighbourhoods:

- Le quartier universitaire
- Le Vieux-Nord
- Collinsville
- Secteur Galvin
- L'Est
- Ascot
- Mi-Vallon
- du Pin-Solitaire
- Le Petit Canada

== Demographics ==
=== City of Sherbrooke ===
Sherbrooke
Year	Pop.	±%
1871	4,432	—
1881	7,227	+63.1%
1891	10,097	+39.7%
1901	11,765	+16.5%
1911	16,405	+39.4%
1921	23,515	+43.3%
1931	28,933	+23.0%
1941	35,965	+24.3%
1951	50,543	+40.5%
1956	58,668	+16.1%
1961	66,554	+13.4%
1966	75,690	+13.7%
1971	80,711	+6.6%
1976	76,804	−4.8%
1981	74,075	−3.6%
1986	74,478	+0.5%
1991	76,429	+2.6%
1996	76,786	+0.5%
2001	75,916	−1.1%
2006*	147,427	+94.2%
2011	154,601	+4.9%
2016	161,323	+4.3%
2021	172,950	+7.2%
(*) Sherbrooke annexed the City of Bromptonville, the City of Fleurimont, the City of Lennoxville, the City of Rock-Forest, the Municipality of Ascot and the Municipality of Deauville.

Sherbrooke (including annexed territories)
Year	Pop.	±%
1871	8,532	—
1881	12,410	+45.5%
1891	15,930	+28.4%
1901	18,724	+17.5%
1911	23,865	+27.5%
1921	33,624	+40.9%
1931	39,323	+16.9%
1941	47,614	+21.1%
1951	63,608	+33.6%
1956	72,789	+14.4%
1961	82,939	+13.9%
1966	94,988	+14.5%
1971	103,083	+8.5%
1976	111,137	+7.8%
1981	117,848	+6.0%
1986	122,282	+3.8%
1991	131,123	+7.2%
1996	136,681	+4.2%
2001	139,388	+2.0%
2006	147,427	+5.8%
2011	154,601	+4.9%
2016	161,323	+4.3%
2021	172,950	+7.2%

In the 2021 Census of Population conducted by Statistics Canada, Sherbrooke had a population of 172,950 living in 80,476 of its 86,019 total private dwellings, a change of 7.2% from its 2016 population of 161,323. With a land area of 353.4 km^{2} (136.4 sq mi), it had a population density of 489.4/km^{2} (1,267.5/sq mi) in 2021.

Canada census – Sherbrooke community profile

	2021	2016	2011
Population	172,950 (+7.2% from 2016)	161,323 (+4.3% from 2011)	154,601 (+4.9% from 2006)
Land area	353.40 km^{2} (136.45 sq mi)	353.76 km^{2} (136.59 sq mi)	353.49 km^{2} (136.48 sq mi)
Population density	489.4/km^{2} (1,268/sq mi)	456.0/km^{2} (1,181/sq mi)	437.4/km^{2} (1,133/sq mi)
Median age	41.2 (M: 39.2, F: 42.8)	40.5 (M: 38.5, F: 42.5)	40.2 (M: 38.0, F: 42.3)
Private dwellings	86,019 (total)	80,341 (total)	75,880 (total)
Median household income	$62,400	$51,706	$46,468

References: 2021 2016 2011

==== Language ====
As of 2021, 86.4% of Sherbrooke residents spoke French as a first language, while those whose mother tongue was English accounted for 3.9%. The next most common first languages were Spanish (2%), Arabic (1.3%), Dari (0.7%), Serbian (0.3%), Portuguese (0.2%) and Mandarin (0.2%).

==== Ethnicity ====
Largest non-European panethnic group in Sherbrooke CMA by census tract based on the 2021 census

As of 2021, approximately 88.7% of Sherbrooke residents were white, while 9.6% were visible minorities and 1.7% were Indigenous. The largest visible minority groups in Sherbrooke were black (3.1%), Latin American (2%), Arab (1.7%), and West Asian (1%).

Panethnic groups in the City of Sherbrooke (2001−2021)
Panethnic group	2021		2016		2011		2006		2001	
Panethnic group	Pop.	%	Pop.	%	Pop.	%	Pop.	%	Pop.	%
White (Note: Statistic includes all persons that did not make up part of a visible minority or an indigenous identity.)	148,235	88.67%	143,110	91.58%	140,695	93.64%	137,040	94.78%	70,625	96.37%
Black	5,215	3.12%	3,515	2.25%	2,530	1.68%	1,780	1.23%	745	1.02%
Middle Eastern (Note: Statistic includes total responses of "West Asian" and "Arab" under visible minority section on census.)	4,530	2.71%	3,235	2.07%	1,825	1.21%	1,410	0.98%	590	0.81%
Latin American	3,410	2.04%	2,705	1.73%	2,110	1.4%	2,005	1.39%	690	0.94%
Indigenous	2,820	1.69%	1,720	1.1%	1,345	0.9%	865	0.6%	140	0.19%
East Asian (Note: Statistic includes total responses of "Chinese", "Korean", and "Japanese" under visible minority section on census.)	965	0.58%	655	0.42%	475	0.32%	620	0.43%	105	0.14%
Southeast Asian (Note: Statistic includes total responses of "Filipino" and "Southeast Asian" under visible minority section on census.)	760	0.45%	530	0.34%	605	0.4%	390	0.27%	260	0.35%
South Asian	710	0.42%	450	0.29%	455	0.3%	310	0.21%	85	0.12%
Other/multiracial (Note: Statistic includes total responses of "Visible minority, n.i.e." and "Multiple visible minorities" under visible minority section on census.)	540	0.32%	340	0.22%	210	0.14%	170	0.12%	40	0.05%
Total responses	167,180	96.66%	156,260	96.86%	150,255	97.19%	144,595	98.08%	73,285	96.53%
Total population	172,950	100%	161,323	100%	154,601	100%	147,427	100%	75,916	100%
Note: Totals greater than 100% due to multiple origin responses

Ethnic origin (2021)
Ethnic origin	Population	Percent
Canadian	57,945	34.6
French	43,525	26.0
Québécois	21,100	12.6
Irish	8,400	5.0
North American Aboriginal	7,605	4.5
English	4,570	2.7
Scottish	3,245	1.9
Italian	2,790	1.6
German	2,305	1.3

=== Sherbrooke CMA ===
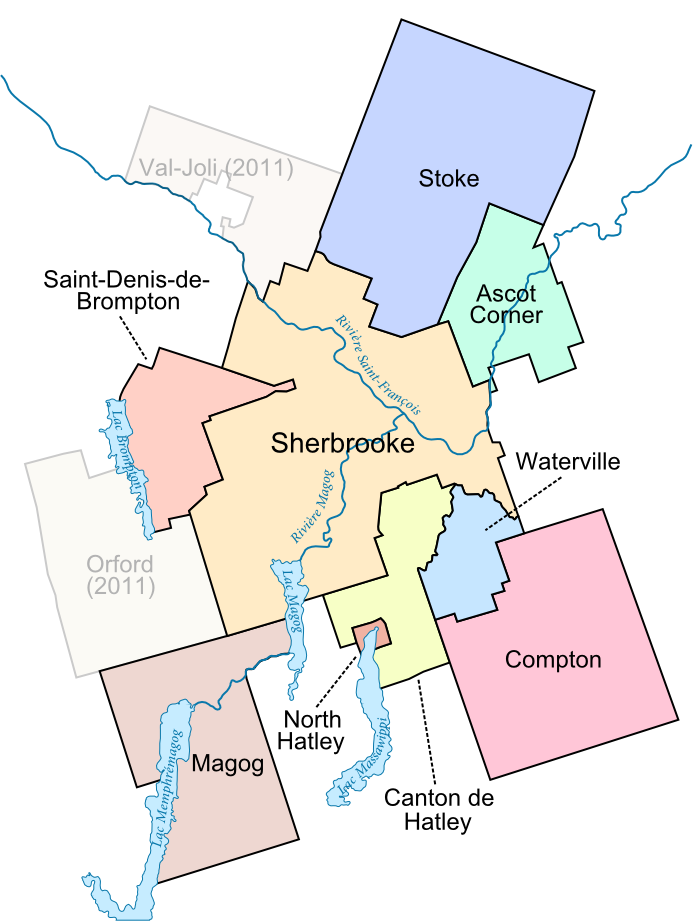
Sherbrooke CMA

The Census Metropolitan Area (CMA) comprises the cities of Sherbrooke, Magog and Waterville, the municipalities of Ascot Corner, Compton, Saint-Denis-de-Brompton, Stoke and Val-Joli; the township municipalities of Hatley and Orford; and the village municipality of North Hatley. The population in 2021 was 227,398. The median age was 43.

Approximately 90.5% of the greater Sherbrooke area residents were white, while 7.7% were visible minorities and 1.8% were Aboriginal.

French was mother tongue to 87.3% of residents. The next most common mother tongues were English (4.5%), Spanish (1.6%), Arabic (1.0%) Dari (0.5%), Mandarin (0.2%), Portuguese (0.2%) and Serbian (0.2%).

About 55.7% of the population identified as Catholic in 2021 while 32.2% said they had no religious affiliation, 2.9% were Muslim, 0.5% Anglican, 0.5% Eastern Orthodox, 0.4% Jehovah's Witness and 0.4% Baptist. United Church and Pentecostals made up 0.3% of the population each while Buddhists were at 0.2%.

== Economy ==
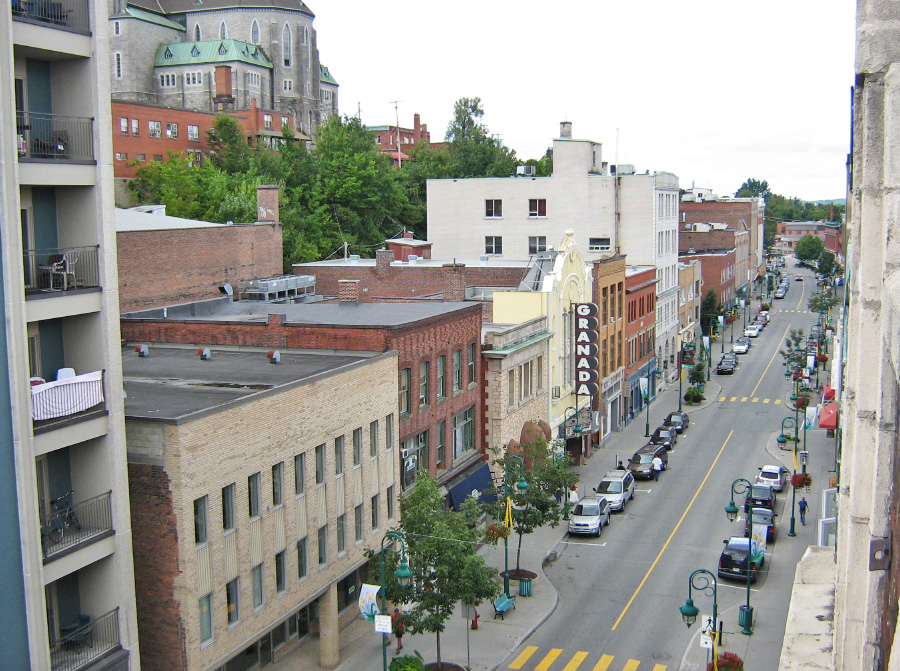
Wellington Street North in downtown Sherbrooke

Sherbrooke, which is the economic centre of Estrie, is a significant cultural, industrial, and academic hub in the province. The city is directly served by two railways: the St. Lawrence and Atlantic Railroad and the Canadian Pacific Railway. Sherbrooke is also served by four highways as well as the regional airport named Sherbrooke Airport but located in the nearby city of Cookshire-Eaton. Sherbrooke Airport no longer offers scheduled passenger services as of March 2010.

According to data from the Institut de la statistique du Québec, average personal income per capita in the Census Metropolitan Area (CMA) of Sherbrooke amounted to CA$30,976 in 2010. Estrie's GDP for the same year was $9.59 billion.

The hockey equipment manufacturer Sherwood was founded in Sherbrooke in 1949. The city is also home to the hockey puck manufacturer Inglasco.

Largest employers

As of 2010, the largest employers in Sherbrooke are Université de Sherbrooke (6,000 employees), Centre hospitalier universitaire de Sherbrooke (5,511), Commission scolaire de la Région-de-Sherbrooke (3,050), Centre de santé et de services sociaux – Institut universitaire de gériatrie de Sherbrooke (2,650), City of Sherbrooke (1,913), Desjardins Group (1,713), Cégep de Sherbrooke (800), Centre Jeunesse de l'Estrie (527), Nordia Inc. (500), Canada Post (497), Kruger Inc. - Publication papers business unit (455), Bishop's University (450) and McDonald's (400). These include enterprises operating in Sherbrooke only and having 400 or more employees.

== Arts and culture ==
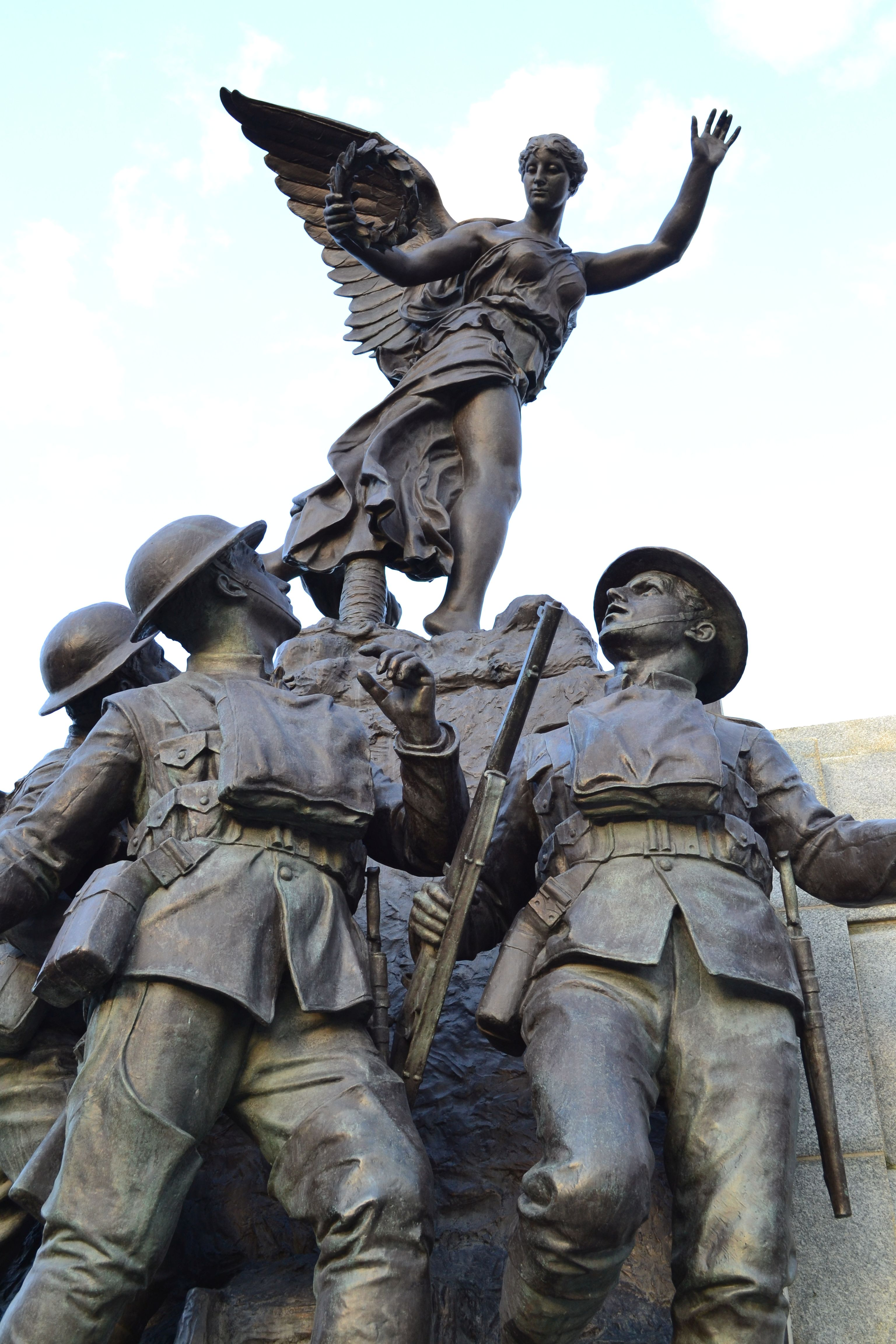
The Sherbrooke War Memorial by George William Hill is a cenotaph erected in 1926 to commemorate the soldiers who were killed during World War I.

In the summer season, several festivals, concerts, and events are held in the city, such as the Fête du Lac des Nations, Sherblues & Folk, and the Festival des traditions du monde. Come winter, the city hosts the Carnaval de Sherbrooke.

The city has British architectural heritage, as seen in the buildings in Vieux-Nord.

Sherbrooke has the fourth-largest theatre in Quebec, the Maurice O'Bready University Cultural Centre of Sherbrooke (Salle Maurice-O'bready du centre culturel de l'Université de Sherbrooke). Music, theatre, and dance shows are staged there. The Centennial Theatre of Bishop's University also hosts music and dance concerts from around the world. The Vieux Clocher, owned by the Université de Sherbrooke, has two stages, the primary being used by various music groups and comedians from around the province. The Théâtre Granada, designated as a historical site by the Canadian government, holds music concerts. It has retained its original architecture since its opening. The Petit Théâtre de Sherbrooke, located downtown, presents musicals and plays for children.

Since 2007, the Centre des arts de la scène Jean-Besré (CASJB), built by the city with the support of the Ministry of Culture and Communications, has assisted in the creation and production of material for the region's artistic community. It serves as the location for training theatre, music, and dance professionals. It contains three rehearsal studios, a production room, a decoration workshop, and a costume workshop, as well as administrative offices for each of its resident companies.

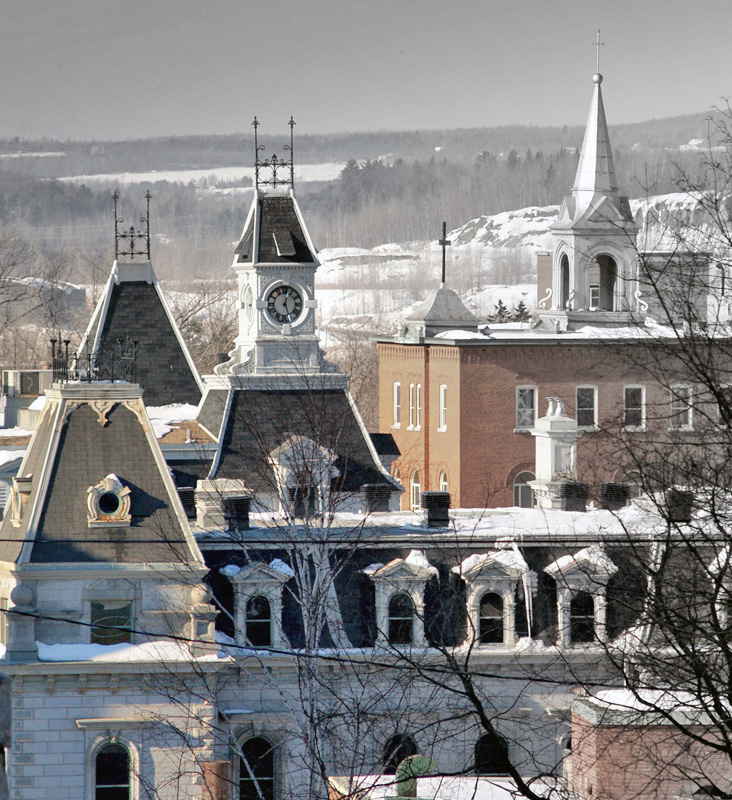
Historical buildings on Dufferin Street

=== Auditoriums ===
- Salle Maurice-O'Bready
- Granada Theatre
- Centennial Theatre
- Vieux Clocher
- Le Petit Théâtre de Sherbrooke
- Théâtre Léonard Saint-Laurent
- Salle Alfred-Des Rochers

=== Libraries ===
- La bibliothèque municipale Éva-Senécal, the main city library (opened 22 December 1990), is named for Éva Senécal (1905-1988), poet, novelist and journalist.
- La bibliothèque du secteur de Rock Forest
- La bibliothèque du secteur de Saint-Élie
- La bibliothèque Gisèle-Bergeron
- La bibliothèque de Lennoxville, at the intersection of rue Queen and rue College, near Bishop's University, offers a book lending service in French and English.

== Attractions ==
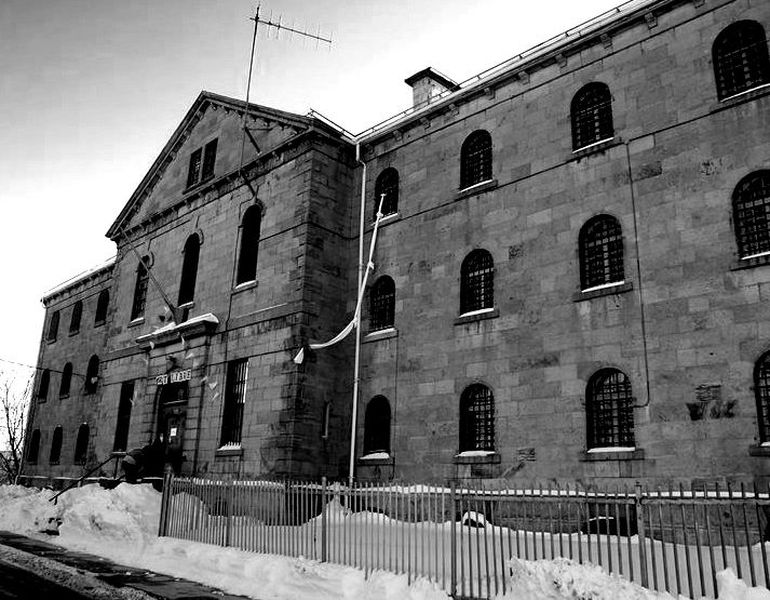
The former Winter Prison

=== Museums and visitors' centres ===
- Sherbrooke Nature and Science Museum
- Centre d'interprétation de l'histoire de Sherbrooke
- Sherbrooke Museum of Fine Arts
- Centre culturel et du patrimoine Uplands
- Art gallery at the Centre Culturel of Sherbrooke University
- Centre d'art actuel Sporobole
- Prison Winter

=== Parks ===
- Johnville Bog & Forest Park
- Forêt jardinée de l'aéroport de Sherbrooke Sherbrooke has parks and greenspaces that encompass a variety of recreational activities. In total, there are 108 in the municipality. Parks Jacques-Cartier, Mont Bellevue, Bois Beckett, Lucien-Blanchard, Central, Quintal, Victoria, and Marais Réal-D.-Carbonneau are among the most popular destinations.
- Jacques-Cartier Park
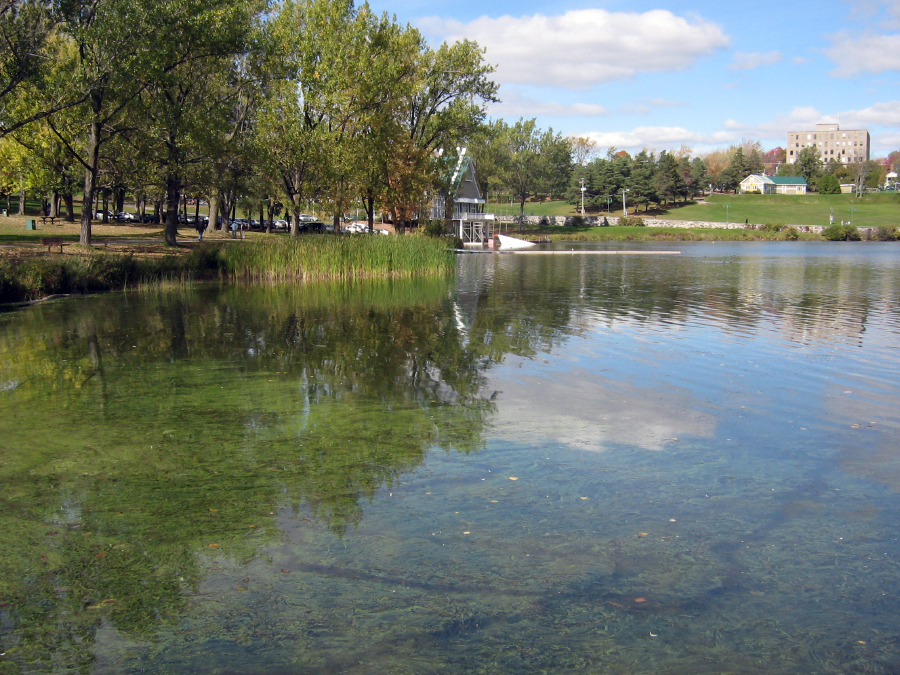
  Jacques-Cartier Park

Situated along Lac des Nations, this park is about 1 kilometre (0.62 mi) away from the downtown area and is connected to the lac des Nations promenade. It contains several sports facilities including soccer fields and tennis courts. Several festivals are held here including the Fête du Lac des Nations, the Carnaval de Sherbooke, the festivities for the Fête Nationale and Canada Day.

- Mont Bellevue Park
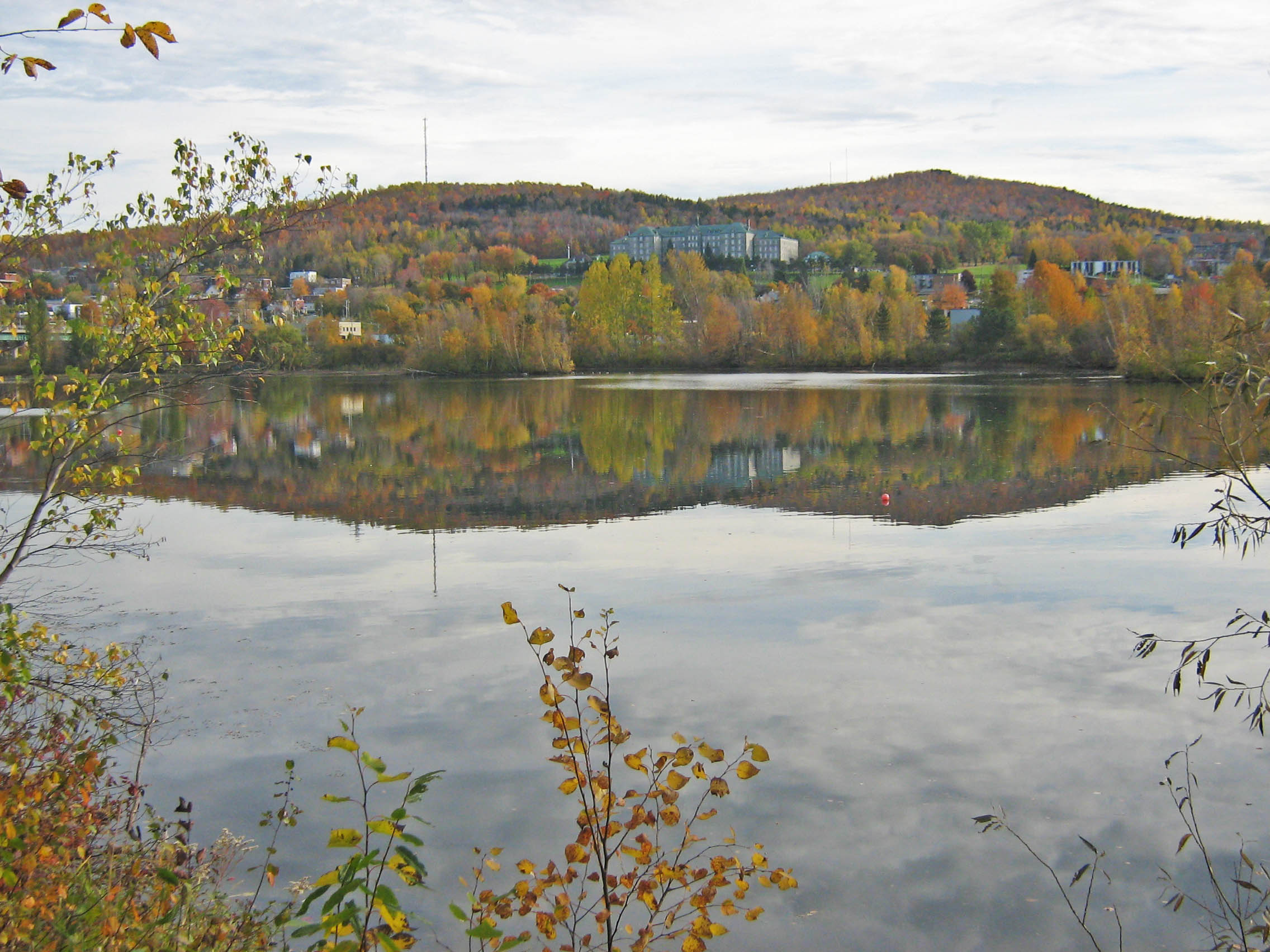
  Mounts Bellevue (left) and John-S.-Bourque (right), as seen across the Magog River

This park is the largest in Sherbrooke, with an area of 200 hectares (490 acres). Situated partially on the campus of the Université de Sherbrooke, it is managed by the city and developed by volunteer organization Regroupement du Mont-Bellevue. Within the park are mounts Bellevue and John-S.-Bourque, the former of which has a small ski station. The park is also used for cross-country skiing, snowshoeing, walking, and tubing in winter; as well as hiking, mountain biking, archery, tennis, and jogging in summer. The park contains a total of 30 kilometres (19 mi) of trails and several different types of ecosystems.

- Bois Beckett Park

This park was established on an old maple grove that belonged to Major Henry Beckett between 1834 and 1870. The property remained in his family until it was acquired by the city in 1963. In 2000, the Ministère de Ressources naturelles et de la Faune recognized the property as an old-growth forest. The oldest tree is said to be 270 years old. The park is maintained, protected and promoted by a volunteer group. Several trails have been built by the city which are open year-round. Within the park, there are several artifacts left behind by Beckett, such as foundations, wells, and farm equipment.

- Lucien-Blanchard Park
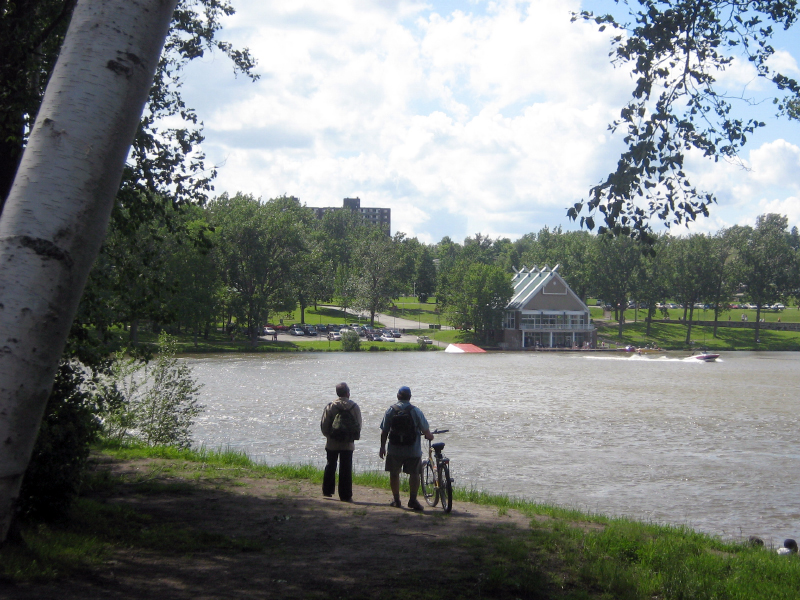
  Armand-Nadeau Pavilion in Jacques-Cartier Park

Situated 3 kilometres (1.9 mi) west of downtown on the bank of the Magog River, this park is open to several outdoor activities such as swimming and beach volleyball. Bicycles, canoes, kayaks, paddle boats, and dragon boats are available for rent. There is an interpretation centre with an emphasis on the reptiles and amphibians of the region as well as a boutique.

- Central Park

At the heart of the Rock Forest–Saint-Élie–Deauville borough, this park is equipped for soccer, tennis, baseball, beach volleyball, and has a playground and an outdoor pool.

- Boisé-Fabi

A wooded area and park in the Rock Forest–Saint-Élie–Deauville borough.

- Quintal Park

Formerly called Parc Central de Fleurimont, this park is situated in the borough of Fleurimont, and mirrors Central Park of Rock Forest-Saint-Élie-Deauville. In early July, the Pif Classic baseball tournament is held in the park, and in August, it hosts the Festival des Traditions du Monde.

- Victoria and Sylvie-Daigle Parks

Across Terrill Street from one another, these parks are situated just east of downtown. Inside these parks lie pedestrian trails, Olympic-size soccer fields, a handicap accessible outdoor pool, and a sports complex. This multifunctional facility, called the Centre MultiSport Roland-Dussault, has an artificial turf allowing local teams the opportunity to practise indoor soccer, baseball, football, rugby, and so on. There is a hockey arena.

- Marais Réal-D.-Carbonneau
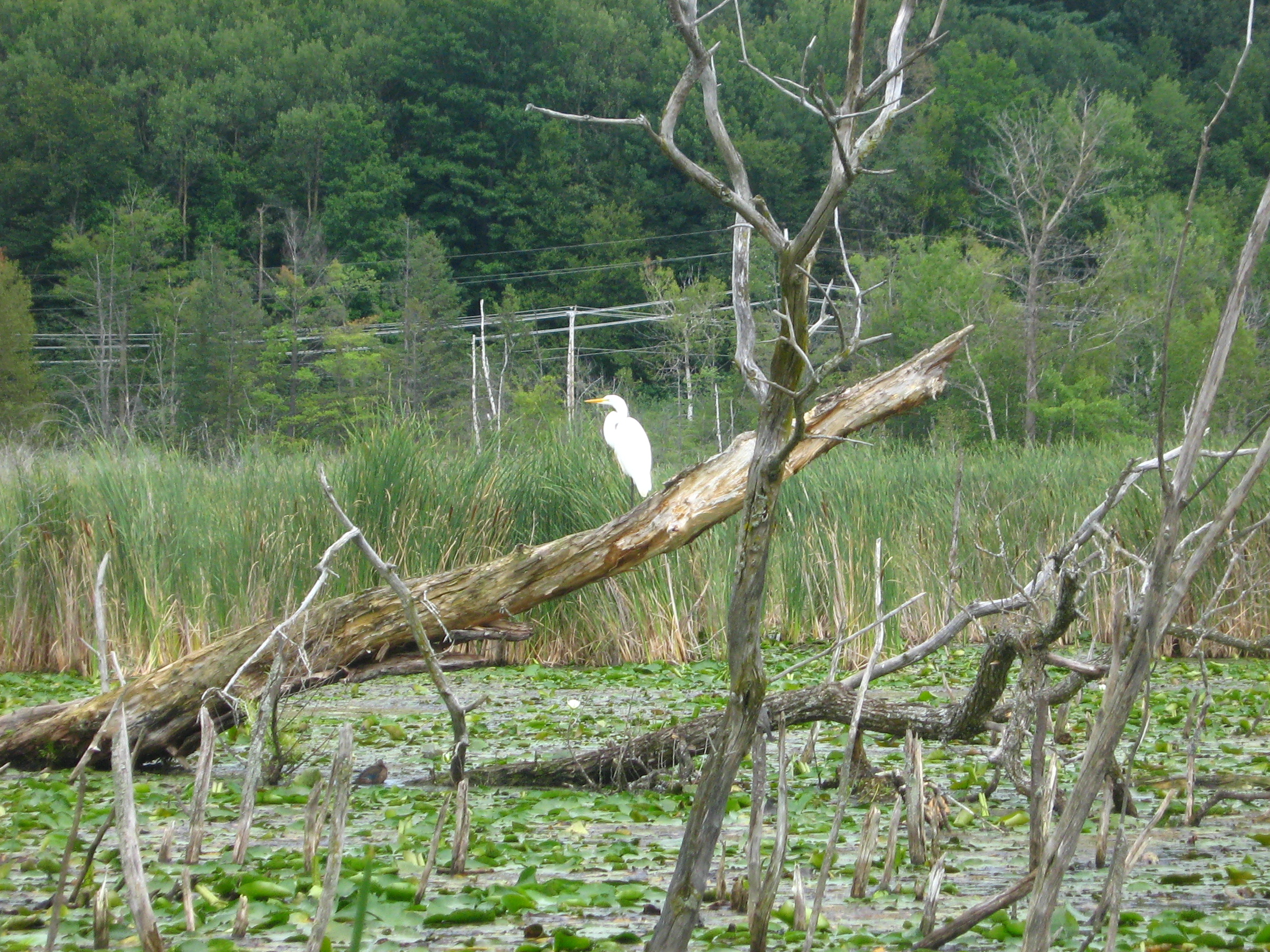
  Le Marais Réal-D.-Carbonneau

Located near the Saint-François River, this marsh was developed by CHARMES, a non-profit management corporation that seeks to promote ecotourism in and around Sherbrooke. The park is located on 40 hectares (99 acres) of land and allows visitors access to wooden piers and observation towers, where there are over 50 tree and shrub species and birds.

== Sports ==
=== Baseball ===
The Sherbrooke Expos of the Ligue de Baseball Majeur du Québec, an amateur baseball league, play their home games at Amedée Roy Stadium.

The city also hosted some games of the 2002 World Junior Baseball Championship, and the 2013 Canada Games.

Historically, several professional teams based in Sherbrooke competed in Minor League Baseball or in independent baseball leagues:

Season(s)	Team	League	Classification
1940	Sherbrooke Braves	Quebec Provincial League	Class B
1946	Sherbrooke Canadians	Border League	Class C
1947	Sherbrooke Black Sox	Quebec Provincial League	Independent
1948–1949	Sherbrooke Athletics	Provincial League	Independent
1950–1951	Sherbrooke Athletics	Provincial League	Class C
1953–1955	Sherbrooke Indians	Provincial League	Class C
1972–1973	Sherbrooke Pirates	Eastern League	Double-A

=== Ice hockey ===
The Sherbrooke Phoenix is a junior hockey team playing in the Quebec Maritimes Junior Hockey League.

The Sherbrooke Canadiens competed in the American Hockey League from 1984 to 1990.

== Government ==
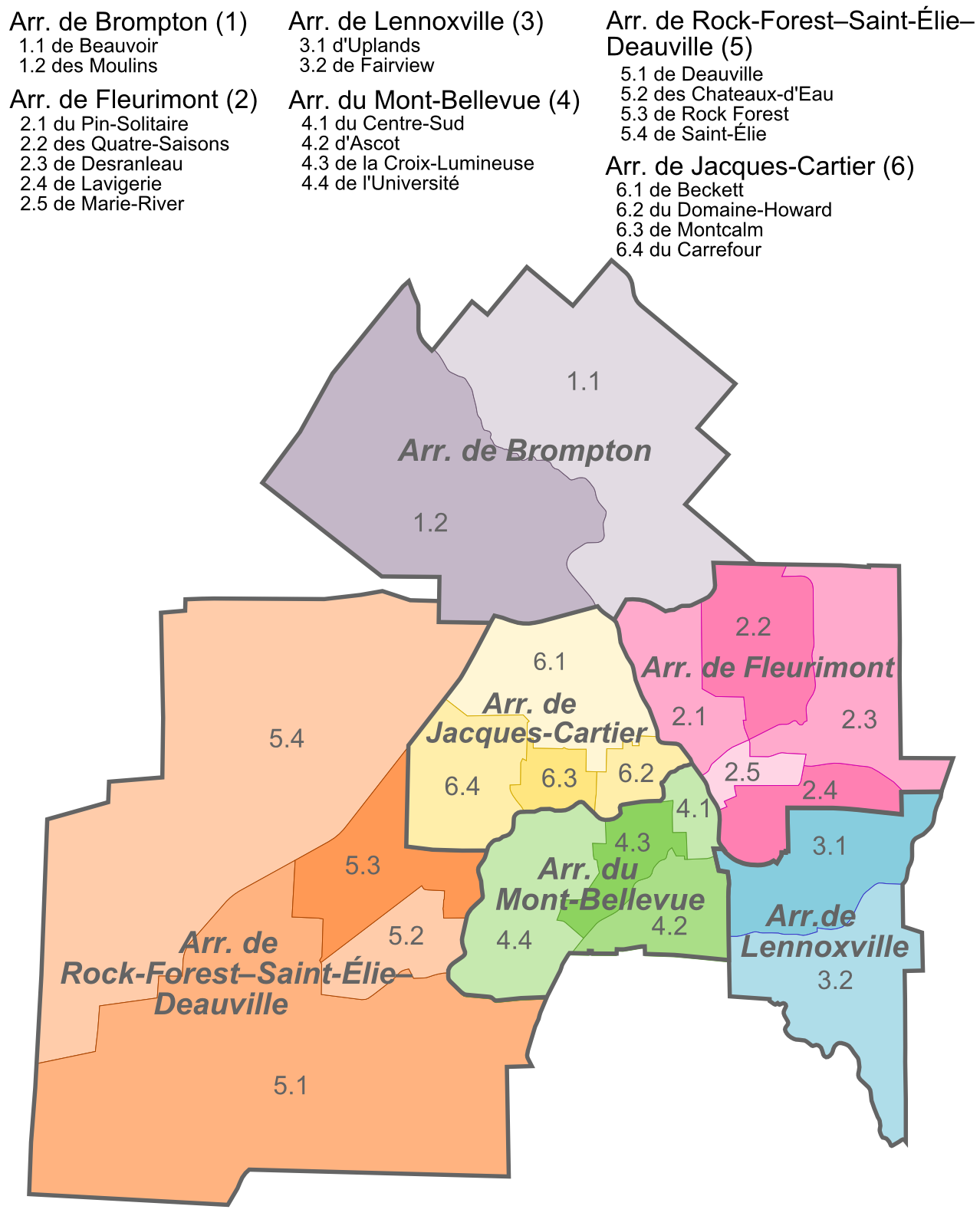
Boroughs and districts of Sherbrooke

Sherbrooke is the seat of the judicial district of Saint-François.

=== Municipal ===
Local governance is provided by the Sherbrooke City Council. The mayor is Marie-Claude Bibeau.

Under the 2000–2006 municipal reorganization in Quebec, Sherbrooke merged with most of the suburban municipalities in the surrounding area: Rock Forest, Saint-Élie-d'Orford, Deauville, Fleurimont, Bromptonville, Ascot, and Lennoxville. This resulted in the creation of six Boroughs of Sherbrooke: Brompton, Fleurimont, Lennoxville, Mont-Bellevue, Rock Forest–Saint-Élie–Deauville, and Jacques-Cartier. Each of the boroughs is subdivided into electoral districts, with the number varying based on population. For example, there are only two districts in Brompton, which only has 6,314 inhabitants, whereas Fleurimont (pop. 40,824) has five. Sherbrooke has 21 districts total, for which the average population is 7,200 inhabitants.

Borough	Population	City councillors
Brompton	5,956	3
Fleurimont	41,276	5
Jacques-Cartier	30,229	4
Lennoxville	5,195	3
Mont-Bellevue	33,377	4
Rock Forest–Saint-Élie–Deauville	29,191	4

=== Federal and provincial ===
Sherbrooke is split into the federal electoral districts of Sherbrooke, represented by Élisabeth Brière of the Liberal party of Canada and Compton—Stanstead, represented by Marie-Claude Bibeau of the Liberals.

Provincially, Sherbrooke is divided into three electoral districts. Sherbrooke is represented by Christine Labrie of the Québec solidaire (QS), Saint-François is represented by Guy Hardy of the PLQ and Richmond is represented by Karine Vallières of the PLQ.

Sherbrooke federal election results
Year	Liberal		Conservative		Bloc Québécois		New Democratic		Green	
2021	37%	31,803	14%	12,239	30%	26,097	12%	10,636	3%	2,347
2019	31%	27,575	11%	9,873	28%	24,967	23%	20,409	5%	4,188

Sherbrooke provincial election results
Year	CAQ		Liberal		QC solidaire		Parti Québécois	
2018	31%	26,790	22%	19,132	28%	23,722	16%	13,437
2014	19%	15,494	36%	29,608	10%	8,355	32%	26,133

=== Public safety ===
In 2007, the crime rate was 5,491 per 100,000.

=== Military ===
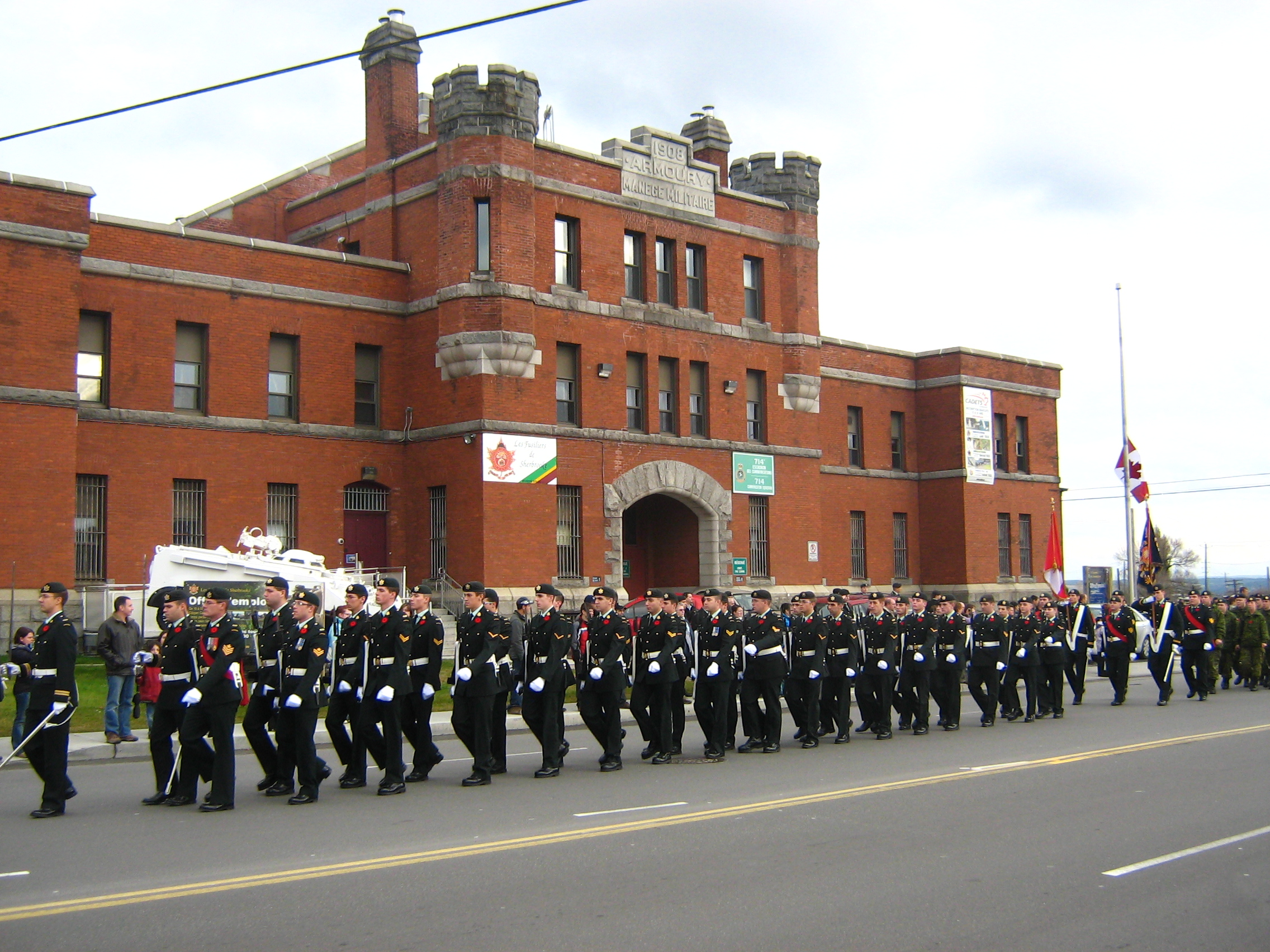
Military parade in front of the Sherbrooke Armoury

Sherbrooke does not host any units from the Regular Force with the exception of a recruiting centre, but four Primary Reserve units are stationed in the city:

- 52nd Field Ambulance, formerly known as 8th Medical Company.
- 714th Communication Squadron, formerly 14th Independent Signal Squadron and 14 Escadron de Transmission du Canada
- Les Fusiliers de Sherbrooke
- The Sherbrooke Hussars, formed from the amalgamation of The Sherbrooke Regiment and the 7th/11th Hussars in 1965.

A Canadian military artifact is preserved at the William Street Armoury: the Sherman tank "Bomb". The tank helped liberate Europe fighting with the Sherbrooke Fusilier Regiment and is the only Canadian tank to have landed on the Normandy beach on D-Day; it fought through to VE Day without being knocked out.

== Infrastructure ==
=== Transportation ===
Transdev Limocar provides bus service to Montreal via Granby and Magog. Formerly, Autobus Jordez linked Sherbrooke to Drummondville and Trois-Rivières, and also to Victoriaville and Quebec City, but since the company lost their licence to operate heavy vehicles, they have sold their licence to Autobus La Québécoise, who now provide the service.

Société de transport de Sherbrooke (STS) provides bus service within the city. It operates 18 bus routes, 10 minibus routes, 7 express routes, 3 taxibus routes, and 3 microbus routes.

The city is located at the eastern terminus of A-10, and directly on the Autoroute Trans-Québécoise (A-55). A-10 provides a direct freeway connection to Montreal and points west, while A-55 connects directly to Trois-Rivières, Shawinigan, and points north, as well as to Interstate 91 to the south (Vermont). A-410 and A-610 are the southern and northern bypass roads, respectively.

The last passenger train for the city was VIA Rail's Montreal – Saint John, New Brunswick Atlantic, which ended service in 1994. There have been recent proposals to provide rail service from Montreal to Boston with a stop in Sherbrooke.

Sherbrooke Airport, in Cookshire-Eaton is just east of the city. There are currently no scheduled flights operating out of the airport. The nearest airports are Montréal–Trudeau International Airport, located 169 km (105 mi) west and Québec City Jean Lesage International Airport, located 213 km (132 mi) north of Sherbrooke.

=== Public health ===
The suburban Sherbrooke University Hospital ("CHUS" or "Centre Hospitalier Universitaire de Sherbooke) has over 5,200 employees, including 550 doctors. It includes a clinical research facility, the Étienne-Lebel Research Centre.

== Education ==
Sherbrooke's educational sector is well-developed, both as part of the city's character and as an important domain of employment, employing about 11,000 people in its colleges and universities. The city has approximately 40,000 postsecondary students, of which about 17,000 are university students.

=== Postsecondary ===
Sherbrooke has five academic institutions that make up the Sherbrooke University Pole, divided between English and French institutions. University students comprise a total of 10.32% of the city's population, the highest concentration in the province.

The city is home to one French-language university, the Université de Sherbrooke, which alone has more than 31,000 students annually. The programs are split between 8 different faculties, the largest ones being in education, medicine, and management with around 7,900, 5,000 and 4,800 students per year respectively. 3,000 of the university's students are international students, coming from around 100 different countries and territories. About half of the foreign students come from France, as they are exempt from additional tuition fees as part of a student mobility agreement between the Québec and French governments. The university is split into three different campuses: the main campus, the Health campus located in upper Fleurimont, and a satellite campus in Longueuil, near Montréal.

One of the province's three English-language universities, Bishop's University, is also located in Sherbrooke, in the borough of Lennoxville. The school brings in around 3,000 students annually, mainly for undergraduate programs. It is subdivided into three faculties and schools, the Faculty of Arts and Sciences, the School of Education, and the Williams School of Business.

There are three Cégeps in Sherbrooke. Two of them are French-language, the Cégep de Sherbrooke and the Séminaire de Sherbrooke, and one is English-language, Champlain College Lennoxville.

=== Primary and secondary education ===
The city's public primary and secondary schools are run by either the French-language Centre de services scolaire de la Région-de-Sherbrooke or the English-language Eastern Townships School Board. The CSSRS educates around 25,000 students and employs 4,000 teachers, support staff, and administrative staff.

Sherbrooke has a total of six public secondary schools:

- Alexander Galt Regional High School
- École internationale du Phare
- École le Goéland
- École secondaire Mitchell-Montcalm
- École secondaire de la Montée
- École secondaire du Triolet

Sherbrooke also has four private schools that offer secondary education:

- Bishop's College School
- Le Salésien
- Séminaire de Sherbrooke
- Collège Mont-Notre-Dame

== See also ==
- List of mayors of Sherbrooke
- List of people from Sherbrooke
- List of regional county municipalities and equivalent territories in Quebec
