= Centre de services scolaire de la Région-de-Sherbrooke =

The Centre de services scolaire de la Région-de-Sherbrooke is a francophone school service centre in the Canadian province of Quebec. The commission covers several primary schools and high schools in and around Sherbrooke, and is overseen by a board of elected school trustees.
