= Alexander Galt Regional High School =

Location
- 1700 Rue College; Lennoxville, Quebec, J1M 1Z9; Canada; 45.3646°N 71.8147°W

Information
- Founded: 1969
- Enrollment: 1150
- Language: English
- Website: alexandergalt.etsb.qc.ca

Alexander Galt Regional High School (AGRHS), in Lennoxville, Quebec, Canada, is an English-language secondary school which opened in 1969. It provides education to 1,150 secondary 1-5 students in the southeastern region of the Eastern Townships. (There are similar English-language regional high schools in Richmond and Cowansville.)

== History of regional schools ==
The regional school concept emerged in the 1960s, in both the English and French language systems. Schooling was previously divided four ways: English or French, Catholic or Protestant. All high schools within a large catch area were closed and students bused to high school daily. High schools in communities like Magog, Sherbrooke, Lennoxville, Stanstead, Scotstown, Sawyerville, Coaticook and Cookshire were converted to elementary schools, where younger children from the baby boom were swelling the capacity. The loss of identity based on their local high school was a challenge which many small communities did not survive.

== Facilities ==
The school is on a 45-acre (180,000 m^{2}) fenced campus on the outskirts of Sherbrooke in viewing distance of Bishops University and Lennoxville. It was constructed with concrete blocks and red brick in a Celtic cross-shape, nestled in a depression with a surrounding roadway level with the second floor. The central block is three-floors high with the administrative offices and auditorium on the ground floor; the cafeteria, kitchens, and music rooms on the second floor; and the library is alone on the top floor.

The gym's east wall butts against the stage wall of the auditorium on a level even lower than the ground floor. The classrooms, shops, and labs are in the three wings, each divided into two houses. The wings are connected to the central block by glass walkways on the second and third floors, with a courtyard on ground level. (In the early years the wings were Yellow, Orange, Red, Purple, Blue and Green. Students were assigned a homeroom with students from all grades, and where they had a locker.)

Each of the stairwells have outside exits. The school has limited structural accommodations for wheelchair or limited mobility users. Part of the building (one wing) is used by the Eastern Townships Technical Institute — a vocational education center.

The school offers and is not limited to:

- Music facilities with private practice booths
- Fully equipped home economics facilities
- Art rooms
- Fully equipped woodworking and print shop for exploratory courses

=== Outdoor sports and recreation ===
The school boasts a large outdoor greenspace which consists of five soccer fields, two baseball fields, a football field and two running tracks. The running tracks consist of one paved, five-lane track that encircles the football field and a backed dirt trail that hugs the outside perimeter of the school property for endurance running. All of these (minus half of a soccer field) are out of bounds to students during the school day.

During the winter season, the school clears some of the soccer fields for winter activity days (winter carnival, etc.).

=== Indoor sports and recreation centre ===
The school contains one wing with the multi-functional gymnasium, and boys' and girls' changerooms. There is one large gymnasium and a smaller gym in a T-configuration. The large gym can be divided using curtains that can be automatically raised or lowered from the ceiling. By using the curtains, the space can be divided to allow for two full-sized basketball courts or four half-sized courts. The curtains reduce noise and distractions for multiple classes or groups using the space simultaneously. The smaller gymnasium contains a rock climbing wall, a half-size basketball court, and a fully equipped weight training room.

=== Auditorium ===
The auditorium is between the central hub and gymnasium. Public access is quite easy, unlike navigating in the rest of the building. It has a seating capacity of 600 people and wheelchair access. The auditorium is equipped for professional theatre with standard sound and lighting equipment system. Each year, the community is invited to attend the school's showpiece theatrical production. The auditorium has been used as a movie theatre for students, when the gym is closed for maintenance or another activity. A majority of the seats in the auditorium are original to the school's opening in 1969. Some of the seats in the back have been replaced due to damage, involuntarily encouraging users to sit in the back of the auditorium.

=== Cafeteria ===
The cafeteria has a seating capacity of 1,000 people and serves hot lunches every day to students for a fee ($5.00). It is in the centre hub on the second floor.

=== Library ===
The library is in the central hub of the building, on the third floor. The library offers its students access to its 28,000 books and 14 computers, with racks of laptops left over from the Enhanced Learning Strategy (ELS).

=== Computer access ===
The school has many portable Apple laptops and desktop computers all with internet access. (See Enhanced Learning Strategy.)

== Programs ==
The courses and programs at AGRHS include Drama, English language arts, English-History (Enriched Literature and Canadian Studies), Ethics and Religion, French language, French Geography, History, Contemporary World, Contemporary World and Literature, Home Economics, Mathematics, High Mathematics (Science or Technical Science), Integrative Project, Media Literacy, History of the 20th Century, Advanced Music, Multi-Sport, Music, Physical Education, School Community Service (Community Skills), Sciences which include Chemistry and Physics, and Spanish.

== Concentration Blocks ==
Students in AGRHS can choose from five concentration blocks. They may choose to do Sports, Science, Visual arts, Hunting and Fishing or performing arts concentrations.

== Sports and activities ==
AGRHS has many sports and extracurricular activities such as Basketball, European football, Tennis, Badminton, Dance, Canadian football, Hockey, Rugby, Intramural Activities, Softball, Swimming, Cross-country running, Cheer-leading, Training and coaching.

Additionally, activities are offered to students who sign up for the related courses in Band Concerts and Drama Play.

Its track field had been established circa 1974. In 1974 the Montreal Star stated that the school had "one of the finest tracks in the province."

=== Sports activities ===
The sports teams at the school have try-outs and have practices on a three-or-more per week basis. They participate in games at the AGRHS or at a neighboring school.

=== School band ===
The AGRHS school band (often referred to as the "Galt Band") tours elementary schools and other high schools in the Eastern Townships School Board, usually on days like Halloween or the days leading up to the Christmas holiday, playing songs related to the theme of the day. There have also been mini-concerts in the cafeteria the promote nonsmoking week.

The band is made up of the rhythm section (drums, guitars, and basses) backing the brass and woodwind section (tubas, trombones, trumpets, alto and tenor saxophones, clarinets, and flutes). Most of the band's repertoire consists of pop and classic rock songs ("Smoke on the Water", "Black Magic Woman", "More Than a Feeling"), as well as some other well-known songs such as the signature Ghostbusters' theme song performed at every Halloween concert, or the more traditional "Ode to Joy" or "O Canada".

The school sometimes requests a few of the more distinguished players from the rhythm section (usually a drummer, a bassist and one or two guitarist) to play songs of their choice for the general public, usually for open houses and such gatherings. Every year features a year-end concert where everyone in the band program is invited to play for the general public with their respective grade. In addition, the school is looking into developing a music concentration option – should there be enough interest – for those interested in learning the finer points in songwriting and producing one's own music, as well as how to work with other musicians and synergize each other's ideas to create the best possible music possible.
