= Fête du Lac des Nations =

Annual festival in Quebec, Canada

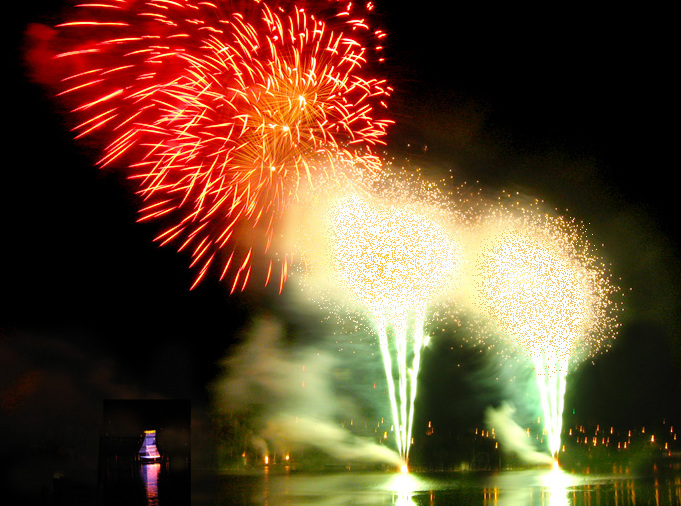

The Fête du Lac des Nations is an annual festival held in Sherbrooke, Quebec in the month of July. It takes place in Parc Jacques-Cartier and features locally, regionally, and globally known musicians, as well as theme park attractions and fireworks. It started in 1981 and in 2011 had a total of 213,000 visitors.
