= Boisé-Fabi =

Park in Sherbrooke, Quebec, Canada

Boisé-Fabi Park
- Parc du Boisé-Fabi
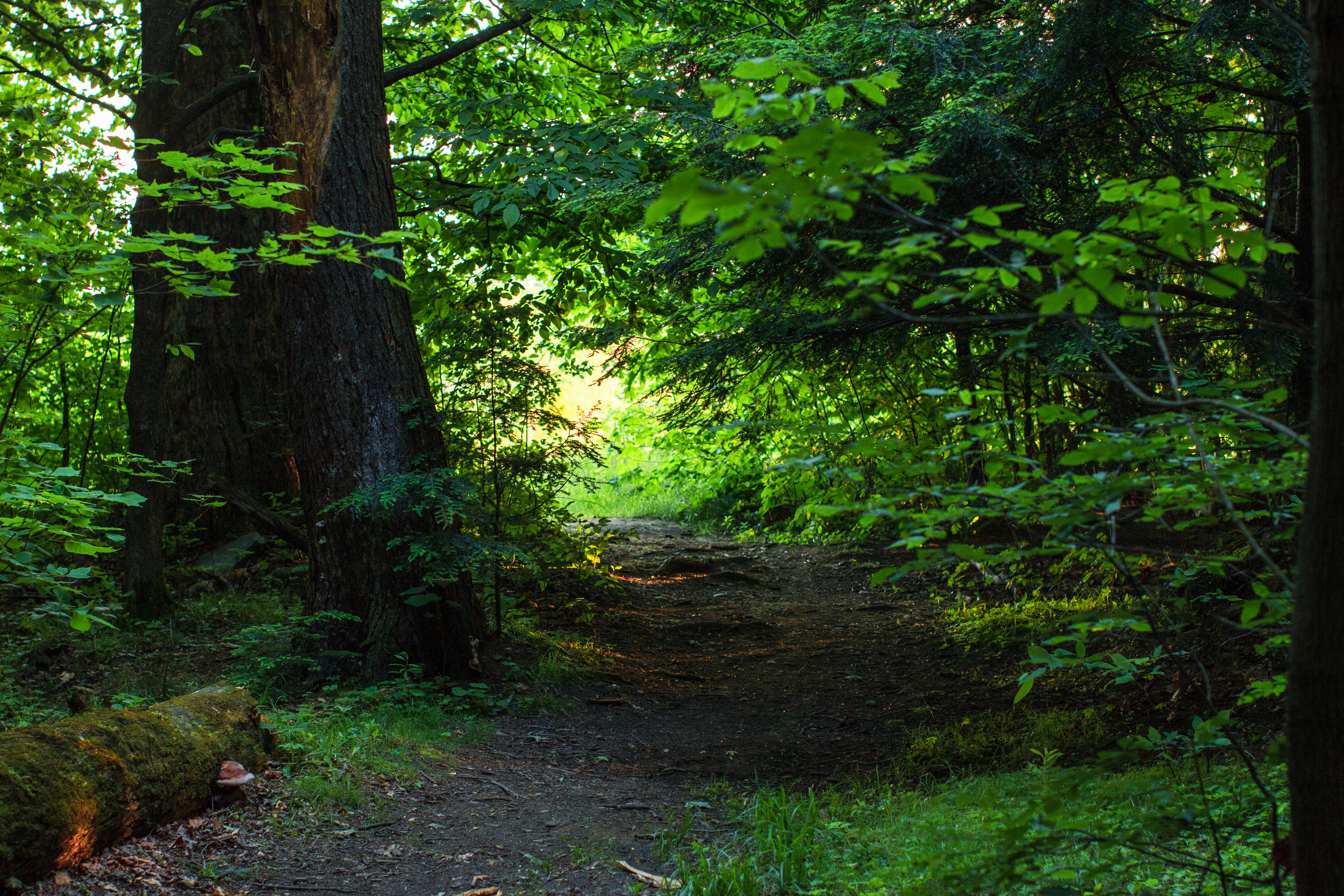
- Interactive map of Boisé-Fabi Park
- Location: Rock Forest–Saint-Élie–Deauville, Sherbrooke, Quebec, Canada
- Coordinates: 45.3629°N 71.9808°W
- Area: 13 hectares (32 acres)
- Created: 2013
- Operator: Sherbrooke

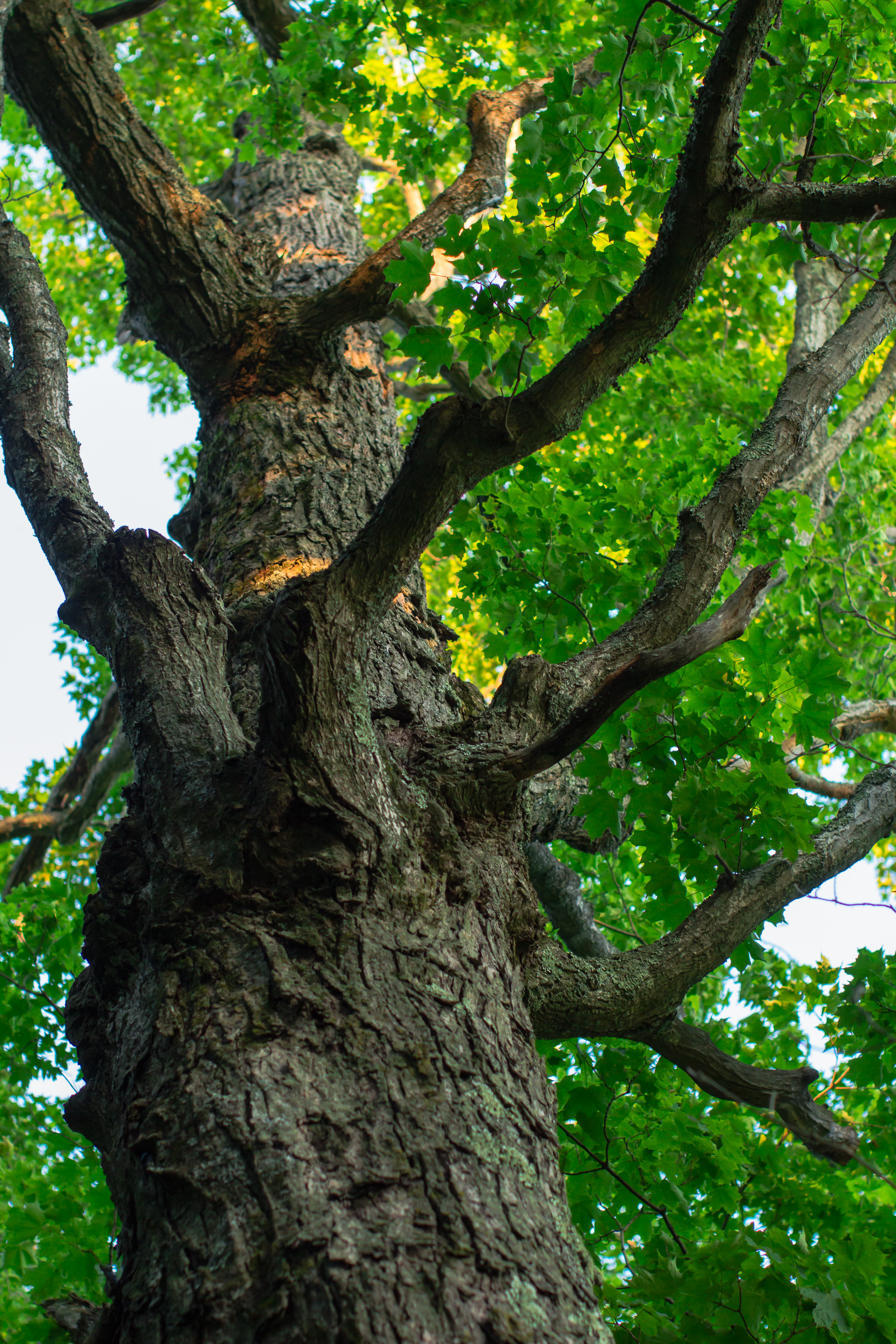
Large Hemlock tree inside the park

Boisé-Fabi, officially named Boisé-Fabi Park, is an urban natural space located in the borough of Rock Forest–Saint-Élie–Deauville, in Sherbrooke, Quebec. It covers approximately 13 protected hectares within a developing residential area surrounding it.

== History ==
Created in 2013, the wooded area has been the subject of community organizing since 2008 to ensure its protection. In 2014, the City of Sherbrooke acquired part of the site for approximately $C 1.45 million, following a majority vote by the city council, with the aim of preserving this natural environment from real estate development.

The name was officially adopted by the Toponymy Commission of Quebec in 2017 in homage to Antonio Fabi (1884–1942), a local entrepreneur.

== Challenges ==
Boisé-Fabi is in the middle of tensions between conservation and urban development. In 2020, a proposed street cutting the park in half sparked controversy, despite the city's desire to limit its environmental impacts.

In 2026, citizens are calling for better planning and increased protection of the park's biodiversity, in a context of increased visitors and residential development nearby.

== Characteristics ==
The site includes several wetlands, streams, and features of old-growth forest. These aspects play an important ecological role, particularly for biodiversity and water management, while also providing a local natural space for residents.
