= Carrefour de l'Estrie =

- Location: Sherbrooke, Quebec, Canada
- Coordinates: 45°24′06″N 71°57′11″W
- Address: 3050, boulevard de Portland
- Opened: 1973
- Developer: Développements Iberville Ltée
- Owner: Groupe Mach
- Num. of stores: 200
- Num. of anchor tenants: 6
- Floor area: 1,109,892 sq ft (103,112.3 m^{2})
- Floors: 2
- Parking: Outdoor

Carrefour de l'Estrie (French pronunciation: [kaʁfuʁ də lɛstʁi]) is a shopping centre located in Sherbrooke, Quebec, Canada. Its anchors include Super C, Shoppers Drug Mart, La Maison Simons, and Marshalls.

== History ==
Carrefour de l'Estrie opened in 1973 with around 100 stores including Eaton's, Pascal, Sears and Steinberg's.

In 1985, Carrefour de l'Estrie was expanded at the cost of 10 million $ to include a new mall wing of 60 tenants, a food court and the first ever two-level store from the Zellers chain.

When Eaton's went bankrupt, a portion of the space was transformed into The Bay and the rest was shared between the boutiques Gap and Esprit.

Zellers closed on December 12, 2012 to make room for Target on the Fall 2013. The bankruptcy of Target on January 15, 2015 left an empty space of 126 000 square feet at Carrefour de l'Estrie. The space has been subdivided in four which include relocated existing tenants Super C on the first floor and Sports Experts on a portion of the second floor.

The Sears store is closed since January 14, 2018. A portion of the store is now Ardene.

The owner changed in 2019, when Ivanhoé Cambridge sold the mall to the Groupe Mach in June 2019.
