= Magog River =

Magog River Sekosonotek
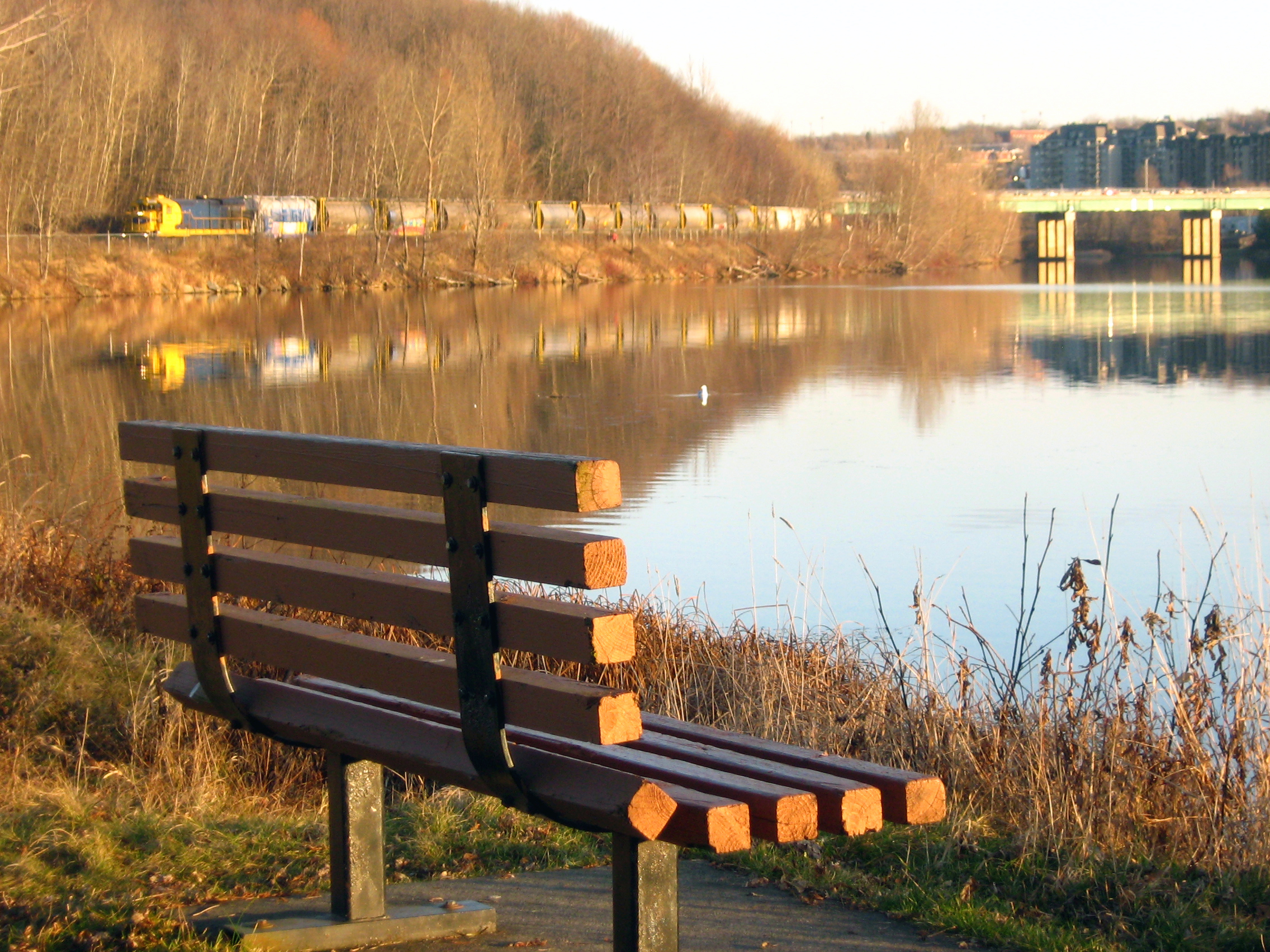
- View of Magog River at the edge of Sherbrooke.

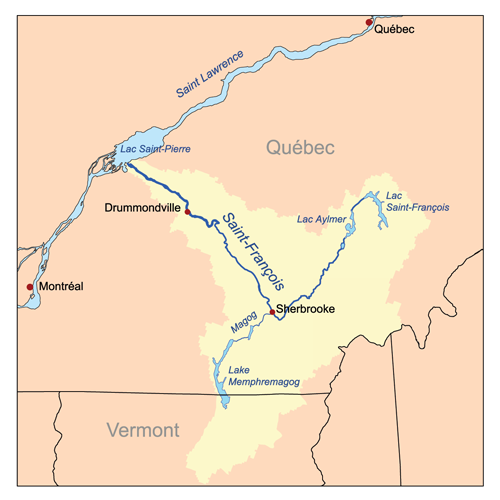
- Map of the Saint-François River watershed
- Native name: Rivière Magog (French)

Location
- Country: Canada
- Province: Quebec
- Region: Estrie
- Cities: Magog, Quebec, Sherbrooke

Physical characteristics
- Source: Lake Memphremagog
  - location: Magog, Estrie, Quebec, Canada
  - coordinates: 45°15′43″N 72°9′32″W
  - elevation: 208 m (682 ft)
- Mouth: Saint-François River
  - location: Sherbrooke, Estrie, Quebec, Canada
  - coordinates: 45°24′20″N 71°53′25″W
  - elevation: 152 m (499 ft)
- Length: 31.8 km (19.8 mi)
- Basin size: 1,900 km^{2} (730 sq mi)
- Discharge
  - average: 14.16 m^{3}/s (500 cu ft/s)

Basin features
- Progression: Saint-François River→ Saint Lawrence River→ Gulf of Saint Lawrence
- River system: Saint Lawrence River drainage basin
- Tributaries
  - left: Red Brook
  - right: Grass Island Brook, Black Brook, Nick Brook, Dodds Brook

The Magog River, or Sekosonotek in Abenaki, is a river that drains Lake Memphremagog. It is a small river running through the territories of the cities of Magog and Sherbrooke, in the administrative region of Estrie, in Quebec, in Canada. It runs along a southwest–northeast axis. Having its source in Lake Memphremagog, it crosses Lake Magog and empties into Saint-François River, in the city center of Sherbrooke.

The cities of Sherbrooke and Magog, Quebec lie on the Magog River.

Engineers from the Université de Sherbrooke have constructed a plastic bridge on the river.

== Geography ==
The Magog course begins in the city center of the municipality of the same name. This departure, located at 208 metres (682 ft) of altitude, constitutes the only spillway of Lake Memphremagog, the Magog river drawing its source via the various tributaries of this large lake, until beyond the country's border to United States. Thus, including in particular the collection areas of the various small rivers that will follow its course, the Magog hydrographic basin covers an approximate area of 1,900 square kilometres (730 sq mi).

At the first kilometer and a half of its route, there is a first dam, named Memphrémagog, followed by the collection of a first stream (km 4.1), named the Red stream. Downstream from this, a second dam (km 5.6), named La Grande-Dame is then interposed, then the river ends in the Lake Magog (km 9.8).

At the level of this 6.5 kilometres (4.0 mi) long lake, the body of water receives brook Noir at its southern end and Red Brook at its northern end. The Magog River then resumes its normal course via a small interstice at the northeastern end of the lake (km 16.3).

The river continues its route collecting water from the Grass Island stream (km 18.5), Gordon (km 19.4) streams, before being interrupted again by the presence of Rock Forest dam (km 19.6). Subsequently, the Magog collects water from the streams Nick (km 21.5) Dodds (km 23), reaches the Drummond dam (km 25), before widening to form Lac des Nations (km 29.1), in the heart of Sherbrooke.

The river then plunges into a deep gorge, beyond the Paton dam (km 30.4), with a declination of 38 metres (125 ft), over a distance of approximately 1.3 kilometres (0.81 mi), overlapping at the same time two other dams (Frontenac, 30.9 and Abénaquis, 31.4), before finishing its course in the Saint-François River, at 141 metres (463 ft) of altitude.

The total length of the river, including the portion of Lake Magog, is therefore 31.8 kilometres (19.8 mi), on a drop of 67 metres (220 ft) and flows mainly along an axis south-west, north-east.

== Toponymy ==
The Abenakis designate this watercourse under the name of: "Pskasewantekw" or "Pskusewantegw", meaning "the river which makes detours".

The toponym "rivière Magog" was made official on December 5, 1968 at the Commission de toponymie du Québec.

== History ==
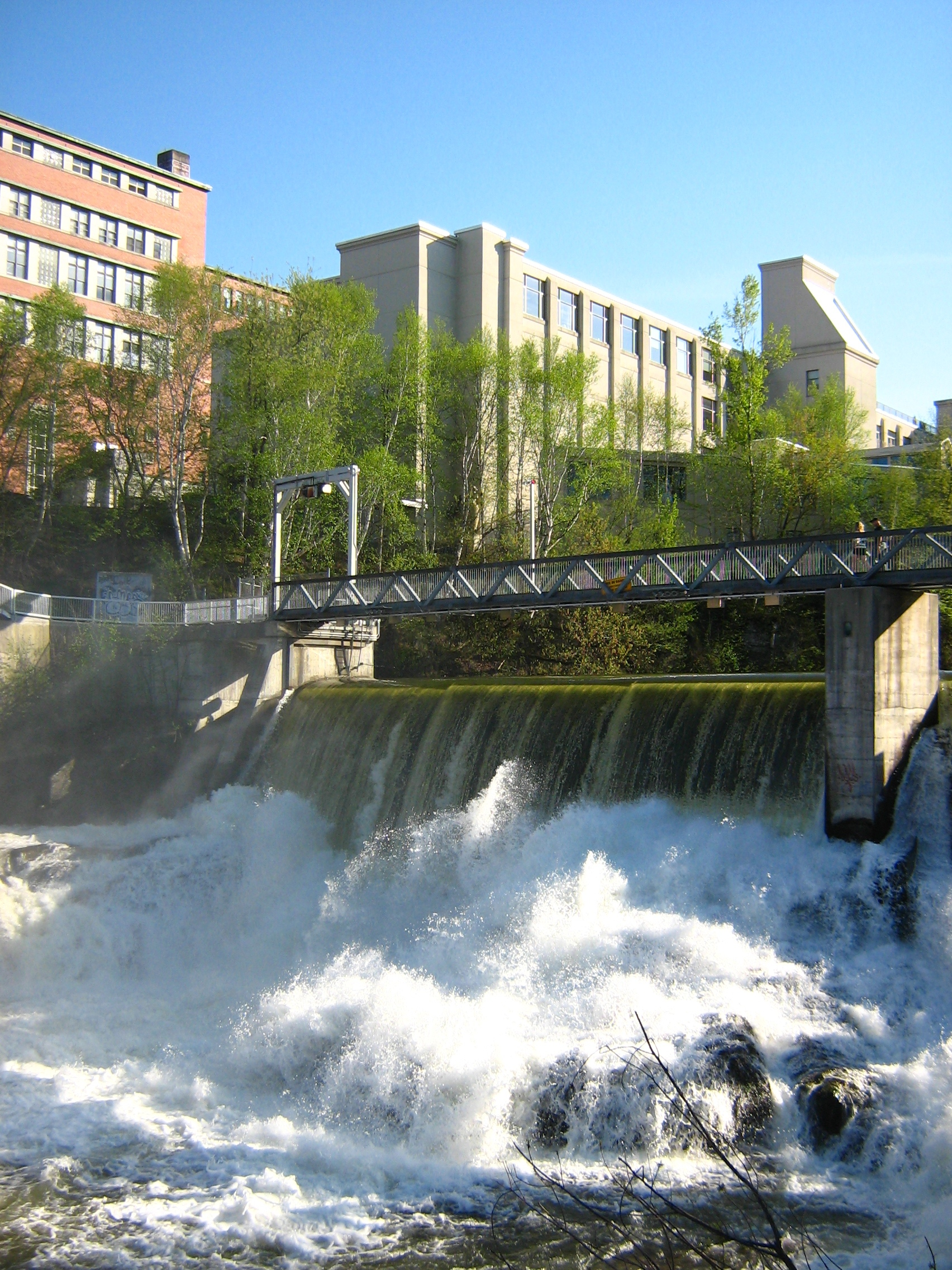
Dam of the Abénaquis generating station, located in the gorge of the Magog river

Its source, located at 208 meters (682 ft) of altitude and its confluence, being at 141 meters (463 ft) of altitude, give it a significant drop, considering its 31.8 kilometres (19.8 mi) in length. The flow of the river at its exit from Lake Memphremagog passed through a natural channel between 92 and 150 meters (490 ft) wide; the current was rapid to Seaswaninepus Lake at a distance of approximately 13 kilometres (8.1 mi) downstream. This lake had a length of 8 kilometres (5.0 mi), then the great falls (Greats Falls), fell at a distance of 800 meters (2,600 ft) before the Forks (The Fork) avec la rivière St-François. The region was mapped by Joseph Blanchard in 1756. The significant drop allowed the construction of seven dams, three of which in the last 1,200 metres (3,900 ft) meters, even a gorge carved out by the river, in the heart of Sherbrooke. One of them, that of the Paton Co. created the Lac des Nations, a water basin formerly intended to provide leeway during low-water periods, in order to allow the continuous functioning of industrial companies, which used the hydraulic power of the river.

Due to its regular flow and its significant variation, it was the scene of various industrial activities, particularly in Sherbrooke and Magog, in the 19th and 20th century. Today, its banks are mainly occupied by private residences, by linear parks, or by a few areas still wooded, industrial activities having almost all disappeared.

== Dams ==
Dams on the Magog River, in chronological order of their construction
Name	Location	Years in operation
Austin-Taylor Dam	Magog	1796-1822
Hyatt-Ball Dam	Sherbrooke	1802-1842
Weatherbee Dam	Magog	1822-1883 (reconstructed in 1853)
Goodhue Dam	Sherbrooke	1828-1854
5th BALC Dam	Sherbrooke	1842-1910
4th BALC Dam	Sherbrooke	1849-1919
1st BALC Dam	Sherbrooke	1854-1926
3rd BALC Dam	Sherbrooke	1871-1902
2nd BALC Dam	Sherbrooke	1877-1916
MT&P Dam	Magog	1883-1915
BALC Dam	Sherbrooke (Deauville)	1883-1911
Hydro-Magog Dam/hydroelectric center	Magog	1897-1911
Frontenac I Dam/hydroelectric center	Sherbrooke	1902-1916
Drummond Dam/hydroelectric center	Sherbrooke	1908–present
Abénaquis Dam/hydroelectric center (previously known as SR&P)	Sherbrooke	1910–present
La Grande-Dame Dam/hydroelectric center (also known as Hydro-Magog II)	Magog	1911–present
Rock Forest Dam/hydroelectric center	Sherbrooke (Rock Forest)	1911–present
Frontenac II Dam/hydroelectric center	Sherbrooke	1916–present
Memphrémagog Dam/hydroelectric center (also known as Dominion Textile)	Magog	1920–present
Paton Dam/hydroelectric center	Sherbrooke	1927–present

== See also ==
- List of rivers of Quebec
