= Garvin Alston =

American baseball player and coach (born 1971)

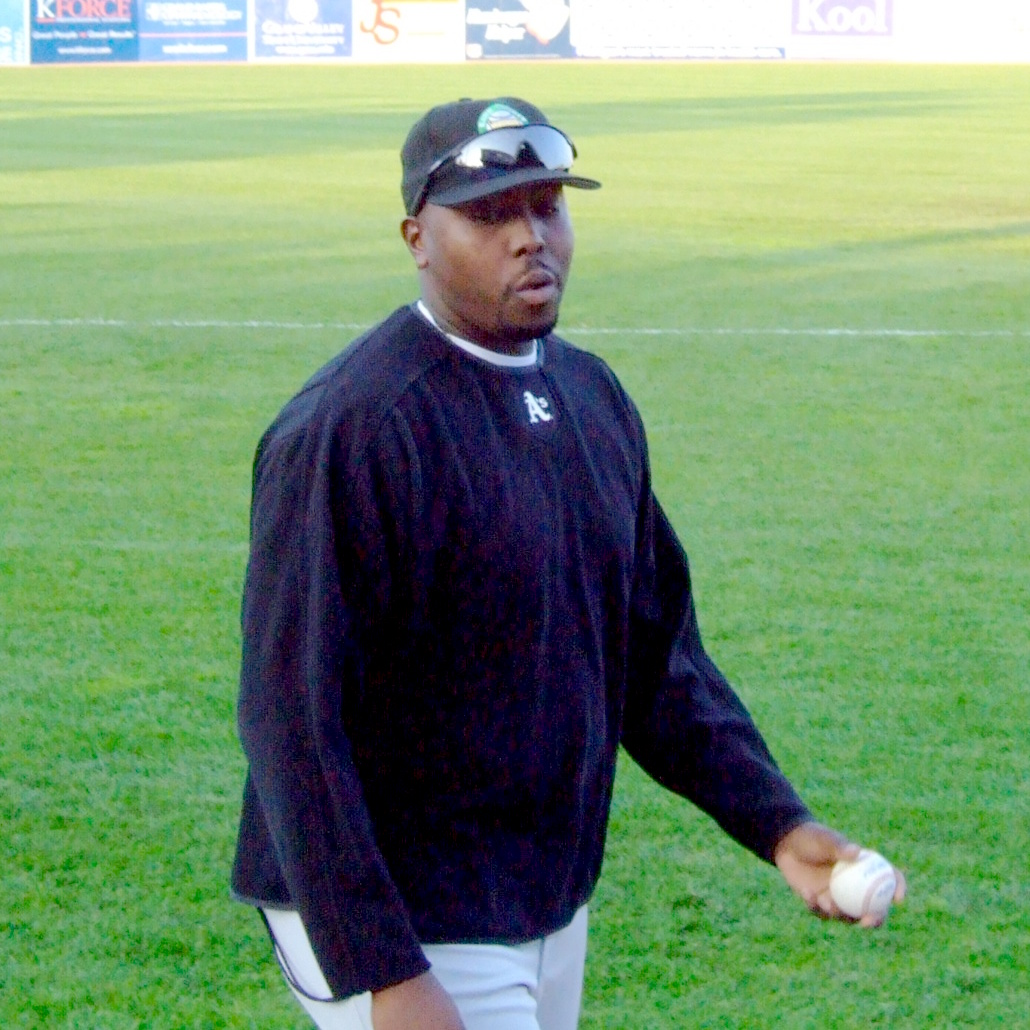
- Alston with the Kane County Cougars in 2006
- Pitcher / Coach
- Born: December 8, 1971 (age 54); Mount Vernon, New York, U.S.
- Batted: Right Threw: Right

MLB debut
- June 6, 1996, for the Colorado Rockies

Last MLB appearance
- June 18, 1996, for the Colorado Rockies

MLB statistics
- Win–loss record: 1–0
- Earned run average: 9.00
- Strikeouts: 5

CPBL statistics
- Win–loss record: 1–0
- Earned run average: 3.18
- Strikeouts: 21
- Stats at Baseball Reference

Teams
- As player: Colorado Rockies (1996); Wei Chuan Dragons (1999); As coach: Arizona Diamondbacks (2016); Oakland Athletics (2017); Minnesota Twins (2018); San Francisco Giants (2024–2025)

Career highlights and awards
- Taiwan Series champion (1999)

Garvin James Alston Sr. (born December 8, 1971) is an American former professional baseball right-handed pitcher who played in Major League Baseball (MLB) for the Colorado Rockies, and in the Chinese Professional Baseball League (CPBL) for the Wei Chuan Dragons. After retiring from playing, he entered coaching and previously served as the pitching coach for the Minnesota Twins. He most recently served as the bullpen coach for the San Francisco Giants.

== Early life and amateur career ==
Alston attended and played baseball at Mount Vernon High School in Mount Vernon, New York. During a game in his senior year against Roosevelt High School on April 25, 1989, Alston threw the first no-hitter in school history since Roy Smith in 1979. Following the game, he described Smith as "one of [his] idols" and said he hoped to follow his footsteps to the Major Leagues. He also managed a .439 batting average at the plate during his senior year and was named to the All-Westchester County First Team as a relief pitcher.

In the summer following his senior year, he pitched for the Bayside Yankees in the All-American Amateur Baseball Association World Series in Johnstown, Pennsylvania.

Alston began his college baseball career in 1990 in NCAA Division II at Mercy College in Dobbs Ferry, New York. As a freshman, he was selected as the New York State Coaches Association's Rookie of the Year, named to the Knickerbocker Conference All-Star Team and to a team of New York State Collegiate All-Stars which played against a team of New Jersey All-Stars at Yankee Stadium. In his sophomore year, he was named a Division II All-American. Over two seasons at Mercy, Alston managed an earned run average (ERA) of 2.84.

In the summers of 1990 and 1991, he played collegiate summer baseball with the Brewster Whitecaps of the Cape Cod Baseball League and was named a league all-star in 1991.

Prior to his third season of college baseball, he transferred to Florida International. In September 1991, he was invited to try out for the United States national baseball team in advance of the 1992 Summer Olympics but ultimately did not make the roster. Alston managed an ERA of 3.83 in his only season at Florida International in 1992.

== Professional career ==
Alston was selected by the Colorado Rockies in the 10th round of the 1992 Major League Baseball draft, the franchise's first year in the draft. Alston said that he was excited to be chosen by the Rockies because he anticipated that the expansion franchise would be advancing prospects to the Major Leagues quickly.

Alston was assigned to the Bend Rockies of the Class A-Short Season Northwest League to start his professional career. Alston initially had difficulty adjusting to life in rural Central Oregon as an African-American man; he found that nightspots played country music and local barbers could not cut Afro-textured hair. However, he quickly formed friendships with black teammates Angel Echevarria and Quinton McCracken. Alston spent the entirety of his first professional season in Bend, starting twelve games and allowing only one home run in 73 innings pitched.

The following year, Alston progressed to the Single-A California League but his performance suffered with the Central Valley Rockies; his ERA jumped from 3.95 in 1992 to 5.46 in 1993. The Rockies kept Alston in Single-A to start the 1994 season as a starting pitcher. He again struggled as a starter, at one point losing seven consecutive starts. However, after the Rockies began using him as a closer, he got his "confidence...back 100 percent." Alston's newfound success as a closer earned him a promotion to the Double-A New Haven Ravens in mid-August 1994. Alston pulled a muscle after reaching New Haven and was limited to only four appearances.

During the 1994–95 offseason, Alston pitched for the Maui Stingrays in Hawaii Winter Baseball. Alston was in Hawaii in November 1994 when he got the news that he had been added to Colorado's 40-man roster. Because he was added to the 40-man, he became a member of the Major League Baseball Players Association before ever having appeared in a Major League game and was therefore unable to participate in spring training during the 1994–95 Major League Baseball strike.

At the conclusion of the delayed spring training following the end of the strike in 1995, Colorado general manager Bob Gebhard told Alston he would be on the team's expanded Opening Day roster. He was returned to Double-A on May 6, however, without appearing in a Major League game when pitcher Lance Painter returned from an ankle injury. Alston spent the remainder of the season working out of the bullpen in New Haven. He set career bests in 1995 in ERA, hit rate, walk rate and strikeout rate.

Alston was sidelined during spring training in 1996 by elbow injuries and assigned to the Triple-A Colorado Springs Sky Sox to start the season. By early June, he was leading Colorado Springs pitchers in ERA and, on June 5, 1996, he was added to the Major League roster to replace pitcher Mike Munoz. He made his Major League debut the following night in a game against the Houston Astros. Alston entered the game in the eighth inning in relief of Kevin Ritz at the Astrodome and allowed both inherited runners to score and was charged with three earned runs of his own over 1 1/3 innings pitched. He did not allow any runs over his next three appearances and lowered his ERA from 20.25 to 6.75. He earned his first pitching win and recorded his first strikeout on June 11, retiring both Houston Astros batters he faced in a game at Coors Field. In his next two games, however, he allowed three runs on five hits in two innings pitched. His outing on June 18, 1996, would prove to be the final of his Major League career. On June 27, the Rockies activated Mike Munoz and returned Alston to Colorado Springs. He would return to the big league club briefly in August to fill a roster spot following an injury to Lance Painter but would not appear in a game and would otherwise pitch the remainder of the season in Colorado Springs.

Alston was expecting to vie for the Rockies' closer job in 1997 but underwent surgery before the start of the season to reroute a nerve, shrink a ligament and remove bone chips from his elbow. Although he initially expected to return to pitching as early as August 1997, he would end up missing the entire season. He returned to the mound in 1998 and pitched the entire season in Triple-A, posting a career-worst 6.45 ERA.

Alston began the 1999 season pitching in Taiwan's Chinese Professional Baseball League for the Wei Chuan Dragons. On August 26, he signed a minor league contract with the Los Angeles Dodgers and finished the season in Triple-A with the Albuquerque Dukes. He split the following season between Albuquerque and in the Kansas City Royals organization with the Double-A Wichita Wranglers. It would be his final season playing in affiliated baseball. He missed part of the year due to appendicitis. In 2003, Alston returned to baseball and signed with the Montreal Royales of the independent Canadian Baseball League (CBL) with the ultimate goal of returning to the Major Leagues. The CBL folded midseason and Alston did not play in another professional baseball game.

Reflecting on his career later in life, Alston said "It was everything I dreamt of." Though he added that he regretted focusing too much on advancing his career at the expense of enjoying "creating memories with friends."

== Coaching career ==
Alston coached in the Oakland Athletics organization from 2005 to 2015. He served as pitching coach of the Single-A Kane County Cougars (2005–06) and High-A Stockton Ports (2007–08), minor league rehab coordinator (2009–14), and minor league pitching coordinator (2015).

The Arizona Diamondbacks hired Alston as their bullpen coach for the 2016 season. In June 2017, he was re-hired by the Athletics as the major league bullpen coach. Alston served as pitching coach for the Minnesota Twins during the 2018 season, but did not return when new manager Rocco Baldelli was hired in the offseason. Alston's highlights with the Twins included improving the command and pitch selection of reliever Ryan Pressly.

In 2021, Alston became the pitching coach for the Sacramento River Cats, the Triple-A affiliate of the San Francisco Giants. On November 14, 2023, the San Francisco Giants hired Alston to be their bullpen coach. On November 8, 2025, it was announced that Alston would not return to the team in 2026.

On January 22, 2026, Alston was announced as a rehab pitching coach within the player development department of the Chicago White Sox.

== Personal life ==
Alston's wife, Natasha, also graduated from Mount Vernon. In 1996, the couple was in the process of writing screenplays based on each of their lives.

Alston's son, Garvin Altson Jr., was drafted by the Chicago White Sox in 2015 and 2019, joining the organization after playing college baseball at Arizona State at USC Aiken. Alston is the cousin of former Major League Baseball outfielder Dell Alston.

Preceded by Neil Allen	Minnesota Twins pitching coach 2018	Succeeded by Wes Johnson
