= Canadian Baseball League (2003) =

Defunct minor league baseball league

- Sport: Baseball
- Founded: 2003
- Founder: Tony Riviera
- First season: 2003
- Folded: 2003
- No. of teams: 8
- Country: Canada
- Last champion: Calgary Outlaws (declared winner)
- Most titles: Calgary (1)
- Broadcasters: The Score (18 regular season games, CBL All-Star Game and Jenkins Cup Championship)

The Canadian Baseball League was an independent minor league that operated in 2003. The league's only Commissioner was Major League Baseball Hall of Famer and Canadian Baseball Hall of Fame member Ferguson Jenkins. The league featured former major league players such as Francisco Cabrera, Floyd Youmans, Rich Butler, and Steve Sinclair.

The CBL was based in Vancouver, British Columbia.

The championship trophy was the Jenkins Cup, named after the commissioner of the league, Ferguson Jenkins.

== History ==
The CBL was the brainchild of Tony Riviera, a former major league scout, and the face of the league. It was backed by former Microsoft product developer Charlton Lui, and later by former Yahoo! president, and part owner of the San Francisco Giants, Jeff Mallett. Canadian Baseball Hall of Famer Ferguson Jenkins was brought in to act as the league's Commissioner.

=== Big plans ===
The league was first announced on September 27, 2001, and was initially intended to launch in 2002. A player draft was held in December 2001, with an initial set of eight teams in Abbotsford, Kamloops, Kelowna, Lethbridge, Red Deer, Regina, Nanaimo, and Saskatoon. However, due to difficulties in negotiations between the teams and the cities, and resultant reorganizations within the CBL, the goal of a 2002 season was scrapped.

In November 2002, the CBL announced a revised plan to start the league in 2003. There were still eight teams, but locations of the teams changed substantially, creating a cross-country league with a Western and Eastern Conference (the original 2002 teams were all west of Manitoba). Only Kelowna and Saskatoon retained their teams. The eight teams were owned directly by the league, and operated with $60,000 salary caps. A 72-game season was planned.

Despite the difficulties, Riviera presented a grand vision for the CBL's inaugural season. He stated that the CBL would be "AAA quality", and he was rumoured to have approached the Winnipeg Goldeyes about switching leagues. Jenkins said that the league aimed to match AA league quality. Riviera also nominated Pete Rose for the Canadian Baseball Hall of Fame shortly before the CBL's inaugural season to raise interest, but Rose's nomination did not succeed.

The big plans initially appeared to be possible. The league announced a national television deal with sports channel The Score, while a crowd of 5,100 took in the league's inaugural game in London, Ontario. Owners and executives from the defunct Prairie League, which had minor league teams in the Prairie Provinces until its demise in 1997, raised concerns about the viability of the CBL and its overly optimistic expectations.

=== Quick demise ===
The CBL's expectations were grander than the results. Early promises that the league would average over 2,000 fans per game, failed to manifest. Only two markets averaged over 1,000 fans per game: Victoria at 1,700 and Calgary at 1,000. Four teams averaged fewer than 300 per game: Kelowna (271), Saskatoon (256), Welland (181) and Trois-Rivières (163). The national TV deal was cancelled after only six weeks after the CBL was unable to find enough sponsors to cover the production costs.

The Montreal franchise never played a game in that city due to a lack of a playing field, as they were denied a lease at Olympic Stadium. Their home games were played at Stade Amedee Roy in Sherbrooke instead. The Abbotsford Saints relocated to Trois Rivieres, Quebec before the season started.

The CBL's swan song was the All-Star game, held at Calgary. Unwilling to absorb any more losses, Mallett pulled the plug on the league, suspending operations the day before the game. A crowd of over 5,700 (the largest crowd to come to Burns Park all season) watched the East and West All-Stars play to a 5-5, ten-inning tie. Following the game, a home run derby was held to break the tie, in which Jamie Gann of Kelowna hit the only home run, thus giving the West the victory. Despite losing as much as $4 million on the CBL, and owing $1.2 million to creditors as of October 2003, Mallett initially promised to bring the league back in 2004. However, the remaining assets of the league were quietly auctioned off on December 1, 2003 in Vancouver and the league never returned.

== Teams ==
East Division West Division

Eight teams played in the CBL, divided into two divisions. Because the season was cut short, teams played different numbers of games. Their records at the time the league was suspended, and their primary home stadiums, are listed below. The Calgary Outlaws were declared the Jenkins Cup champions at the season's end, on the basis of having the league's best record to that point.

West Division

- Calgary Outlaws (24–13) – Foothills Stadium
- Saskatoon Legends (22–15) – Cairns Field
- Kelowna Heat (18–19) – Elks Stadium
- Victoria Capitals (13–22) – Royal Athletic Park

East Division

- London Monarchs (20–13) – Labatt Park
- Niagara Stars (15–15) – Welland Stadium
- Trois-Rivières Saints (14–17) – Stade Municipal
- Montreal Royales (10–22) – Amedée Roy Stadium (Sherbrooke)
