= Soccer at the 2013 Canada Summer Games =

Soccer at the 2013 Canada Summer Games may refer to:

- Men's soccer at the 2013 Canada Summer Games
- Women's soccer at the 2013 Canada Summer Games
