= Soccer at the 2013 Canada Summer Games – Men's tournament =

The men's soccer tournament at the 2013 Canada Summer Games was held at the Université de Sherbrooke Stadium and Bishop's University in Sherbrooke, Quebec.

The matches were held between August 12 and 17, 2013. Quebec won the gold medal, with British Columbia taking the silver and Ontario taking the bronze.

== Men ==
=== Group A ===
Team	Pld	W	T	L	GF	GA
Quebec	2	1	1	0	2	0
British Columbia	2	0	2	0	1	1
Manitoba	2	0	1	1	1	3

=== Group B ===
Team	Pld	W	T	L	GF	GA
Alberta	2	2	0	0	13	1
Newfoundland and Labrador	2	1	0	1	2	7
Saskatchewan	2	0	0	2	1	8

=== Group C ===
Team	Pld	W	T	L	GF	GA
New Brunswick	2	2	0	0	3	0
Ontario	2	1	0	1	7	1
Yukon	2	0	0	2	0	9

=== Group D ===
Team	Pld	W	T	L	GF	GA
Nova Scotia	2	2	0	0	12	1
Prince Edward Island	2	1	0	1	6	3
Northwest Territories	2	0	0	2	1	15

== Schedule ==
August 12 Matchday 1	Quebec	2–0	Manitoba	Parc Sylvie-Daigle
	Charles Joly 23' 63'	Report	Genio Cisternino (yellow card) 36'

August 12 Matchday 1	Alberta	6–1	Saskatchewan	Parc Sylvie-Daigle
	Ajay Khabra 29'; Ajeej Sarkaria 40' 75' 88'; Nico Pasquotti 52' 69'; Yassin Yusuf (yellow card) 45+1'	Report	Kristian McCullough 76'; Mido Assran (yellow card) 20'; Michael Miller (yellow card) 48'; Alex Ingraham (yellow card) 55'; Marcos Henderson (yellow card) 90'

August 12 Matchday 1	Ontario	7–0	Yukon	Bishop's University
	Kamal Miller 27'; Maurizio Ragone 53' 70'; Daymon Blackport 76'; Ryan Kolenda 90'; Lucas Puntillo 90+2'; Raheem Rose 90+3'	Report

August 12 Matchday 1	Nova Scotia	9–1	Northwest Territories	Bishop's University
		Report

August 13 Matchday 2	British Columbia	1–1	Manitoba	Bishop's University
	Parker Ellis		Genio Cisternino; Alejandro Vasquez (red card)

August 13 Matchday 2	Newfoundland	2–0	Saskatchewan	Bishop's University
		Report

August 13 Matchday 2	New Brunswick	2–0	Yukon	Université de Sherbrooke
		Report

August 13 Matchday 2	Prince Edward Island	6–0	Northwest Territories	Université de Sherbrooke
		Report

August 14 Matchday 3	Quebec	0–0	British Columbia	Parc Sylvie-Daigle
		Report

August 14 Matchday 3	Alberta	7–0	Newfoundland	Parc Sylvie-Daigle
		Report

August 14 Matchday 3	Ontario	0–1	New Brunswick	Bishop's University
		Report

August 14 Matchday 3	Nova Scotia	3–0	Prince Edward Island	Bishop's University
		Report

August 15 Quarterfinal	Prince Edward Island	0–2	Quebec	Parc Sylvie-Daigle
		Report

August 15 Quarterfinal	British Columbia	1–0	Nova Scotia	Parc Sylvie-Daigle
		Report

August 15 Quarterfinal	Alberta	0–1	Ontario	Bishop's University
		Report

August 15 Quarterfinal	New Brunswick	0–1	Newfoundland	Bishop's University
		Report

August 15 Consolation round	Manitoba	7–0	Northwest Territories	Université de Sherbrooke
		Report

August 15 Consolation round	Saskatchewan	5–1	Yukon	Université de Sherbrooke
		Report

August 16 Semifinal	Quebec	4–1	Newfoundland	Parc Sylvie-Daigle
		Report

August 16 Semifinal	British Columbia	1–0	Ontario	Parc Sylvie-Daigle
		Report

August 16 Ranking game	Prince Edward Island	2–1	New Brunswick	Bishop's University
		Report

August 16 Ranking game	Alberta	2–1	Nova Scotia	Bishop's University
		Report

August 16 Ranking game	Northwest Territories	0–2	Yukon	Université de Sherbrooke
		Report

August 16 Ranking game	Manitoba	1–2	Saskatchewan	Université de Sherbrooke
		Report

August 17 Ranking game	New Brunswick	1–3	Nova Scotia	Bishop's University
		Report

August 17 Ranking game	Alberta	6–1	Prince Edward Island	Bishop's University
		Report

August 17 Bronze Medal	Ontario	3–0	Newfoundland	Parc Sylvie-Daigle
		Report

August 17 Gold Medal	British Columbia	0–2	Quebec	Parc Sylvie-Daigle
		Report

== Final ranking ==
Placing	Team
1st place, gold medalist(s)	Quebec
2nd place, silver medalist(s)	British Columbia
3rd place, bronze medalist(s)	Ontario
4	Newfoundland and Labrador
5	Alberta
6	Prince Edward Island
7	Nova Scotia
8	New Brunswick
9	Saskatchewan
10	Manitoba
11	Yukon
12	Northwest Territories
