= Golf at the 2013 Canada Summer Games =

Golf at the 2013 Canada Summer Games was held at the Misby Golf Club in Sherbrooke, Quebec. It was run from 14 to 17 August. There were four events of golf, male and female individual and team.

== Medal table ==
The following is the medal table for golf at the 2013 Canada Summer Games.

* Host nation (Quebec)

Rank	Nation	Gold	Silver	Bronze	Total
1	British Columbia	4	0	0	4
2	Quebec*	0	3	1	4
3	Ontario	0	1	0	1
4	Alberta	0	0	3	3
Totals (4 entries)		4	4	4	12

== Results ==
Event	Gold		Silver		Bronze	
Male individual	Kevin Kwon; British Columbia	279	Étienne Papineau; Quebec	292	Matt Williams; Alberta	292
Male team	British Columbia; Kevin Kwon; Mark Lindsay Valliere; Trevor Yu	571	Ontario; Austin Alan James; Jake Daniel McNulty; Carter Simon	583	Quebec; Raphael Lapierre-Messier; Hugo Bernard; Étienne Papineau	588
Female individual	Taylor Kim; British Columbia	292	Valérie Tanguay; Quebec	297	Sabrine Garrison; Alberta	306
Female team	British Columbia; Taylor Kim; Naomi Ko; Alix Kong	593	Quebec; Annie Lacombe; Catherine Rousseau; Valérie Tanguay	610	Alberta; Sabrine Garrison; Jaclyn Lee; Devon Spriddle	614
