= Montreal Royals (disambiguation) =

The Montreal Royals were the AAA affiliate of the Brooklyn Dodgers.

Montreal Royals may also refer to:

- Montreal Royales, a professional baseball team in the Canadian Baseball League
- Royal Montreal Hockey Club, or 'Montreal Royals', a hockey team in the Quebec Junior and Senior Hockey Leagues
- Montreal Royals (football), a football team of the Interprovincial Rugby Football Union, a predecessor of the Canadian Football League
- Montreal Matrix, a defunct basketball team formerly known as Montreal Royal
- Montreal Royal (UFA), an Ultimate team in the Ultimate Frisbee Association
