= Volleyball at the 2013 Canada Summer Games =

Volleyball at the 2013 Canada Summer Games was held at the Université de Sherbrooke's Centre Sportifin Sherbrooke, Quebec.

The events will be held during the first week between August 3 and 8, 2013.

== Medal table ==
The following is the medal table for diving at the 2013 Canada Summer Games.

* Host nation ( Quebec)

Rank	Nation	Gold	Silver	Bronze	Total
1	Alberta	2	0	0	2
2	British Columbia	0	1	1	2
3	Quebec*	0	1	0	1
4	Manitoba	0	0	1	1
Totals (4 entries)		2	2	2	6

== Medallists ==
Event	Gold	Silver	Bronze
Men's	Alberta	Quebec	British Columbia
Women's	Alberta	British Columbia	Manitoba

== Men's ==
=== Group A ===
Team	W	L	Sets won	Sets lost	Pts for	Pts against
Alberta	4	0	12	4	373	340
Quebec	3	1	10	4	338	297
Manitoba	2	2	7	7	336	323
New Brunswick	1	3	5	9	310	337
Nova Scotia	0	4	2	12	269	329

=== Group B ===
Team	W	L	Sets won	Sets lost	Pts for	Pts against
Ontario	5	0	15	0	375	233
British Columbia	4	1	12	5	396	270
Saskatchewan	3	2	11	6	383	312
Newfoundland and Labrador	2	3	6	11	293	410
Yukon	1	4	5	12	308	389
Prince Edward Island	0	5	0	15	243	384

=== Playoffs ===
Quarter-finals
2	British Columbia	3
3	Manitoba	2
2	Quebec	3
3	Saskatchewan	0

Semi-finals
1	Alberta	3
2	British Columbia	0
1	Ontario	2
2	Quebec	3

Finals
1	Alberta	3
2	Quebec	0
Third place
2	British Columbia	3
1	Ontario	1

== Women's ==
=== Group C ===
Team	W	L	Sets won	Sets lost	Pts for	Pts against
Manitoba	4	0	12	0	301	207
Quebec	3	1	9	4	285	255
Nova Scotia	2	2	7	6	303	278
New Brunswick	1	3	3	10	260	310
Newfoundland and Labrador	0	4	1	12	226	325

=== Group D ===
Team	W	L	Sets won	Sets lost	Pts for	Pts against
British Columbia	5	0	15	1	395	232
Alberta	4	1	13	5	405	296
Ontario	3	2	11	6	385	303
Saskatchewan	2	3	6	9	319	295
Prince Edward Island	1	4	3	12	209	337
Yukon	0	5	0	15	125	375

=== Playoffs ===
Quarter-finals
2	Alberta	3
3	Quebec	0
2	Ontario	3
3	Nova Scotia	1

Semi-finals
1	Manitoba	0
2	Alberta	3
1	British Columbia	3
2	Ontario	1

Finals
2	Alberta	3
1	British Columbia	2
Third place
1	Manitoba	3
3	Ontario	2
