= Soccer at the 2013 Canada Summer Games – Women's tournament =

Soccer] is an event at the 2013 Canada Summer Games. There was a women's and men's competition.

== Women's ==
=== Group A ===
Team	Pld	W	T	L	GF	GA
British Columbia	2	2	0	0	8	0
Manitoba	2	1	1	0	3	5
New Brunswick	2	0	0	2	1	7

August 3, 2013
New Brunswick	0–4	British Columbia	Sylvie-Daigle Park, Sherbrooke, Quebec
August 4, 2013
Manitoba	3–1	New Brunswick	Sylvie-Daigle Park, Sherbrooke, Quebec
August 5, 2013
British Columbia	4–0	Manitoba	University of Sherbrooke Stadium, Sherbrooke, Quebec

=== Group B ===
Team	Pld	W	T	L	GF	GA
Quebec	2	2	0	0	10	0
Saskatchewan	2	0	0	2	0	10

August 3, 2013
Quebec	3–0	Saskatchewan	Bishop's University, Sherbrooke, Quebec
August 5, 2013
Quebec	7–0	Saskatchewan	University of Sherbrooke Stadium, Sherbrooke, Quebec

=== Group C ===
Team	Pld	W	T	L	GF	GA
Ontario	2	2	0	0	5	0
Newfoundland and Labrador	2	1	0	1	9	3
Prince Edward Island	2	0	0	2	0	11

August 3, 2013
Prince Edward Island	0–2	Ontario	Sylvie-Daigle Park, Sherbrooke, Quebec
August 4, 2013
Prince Edward Island	0–9	Newfoundland and Labrador	University of Sherbrooke Stadium, Sherbrooke, Quebec
August 5, 2013
Ontario	3–0	Newfoundland and Labrador	Bishop's University, Sherbrooke, Quebec

=== Group D ===
Team	Pld	W	T	L	GF	GA
Nova Scotia	1	1	0	0	17	0
Alberta	1	1	0	0	8	0
Yukon	2	0	2	0	0	25

August 3, 2013
Alberta	8–0	Yukon	Bishop's University, Sherbrooke, Quebec
August 4, 2013
Nova Scotia	17–0	Yukon	University of Sherbrooke Stadium, Sherbrooke, Quebec
August 5, 2013
Alberta	1–5	Nova Scotia	Bishop's University, Sherbrooke, Quebec

=== Playoffs ===
Quarter-finals
August 6 — Bishops University
Quebec	5
Newfoundland and Labrador	0
August 6 — Sylvie-Daigle
Manitoba	0
Nova Scotia	1
August 6 — Sylvie-Daigle
Alberta	2
British Columbia	4
August 6 — Bishop's University
Ontario	2
Saskatchewan	0

Semi-finals
August 7 — Sylvie-Daigle
Quebec	2
Nova Scotia	0
August 7 — Sylvie-Daigle
British Columbia	2
Ontario	1

Final
August 8 — Universite de Sherbrooke Stadium
Quebec	2
British Columbia	3
Third place
August 8 — Universite de Sherbrooke Stadium
Nova Scotia	0
Ontario	1

== Selected rosters ==
=== Alberta ===
Name	Position	Club
Jordan Cunningham	Defence	Edmonton Strikers
Claire Bergh	Midfield	Calgary Rangers FC
Kathleen Chin	Defence	Calgary Rangers FC
Olivia Chu	Forward	Northwest United
Sarah Dubois	Goalkeeper	Edmonton Victoria
Kayla Evans	Defence	Edmonton Victoria
Jessica French	Defence	Scottish United
Keeley Gormley	Defence	Calgary Rangers FC
Sarah Kinzner	Midfield	Calgary Foothills
Kayla Kreutzer	Midfield	Scottish United
Nicole Lindsay	Midfield	Edmonton Victoria
Kaitlyn Lomsnes	Forward	Calgary Rangers FC
Tyler Rae Molloy		Edmonton Victoria
Elissa Neff	Forward	Calgary Rangers FC
Meghan Oram	Forward	Calgary Foothills
Sophie Traxler	Goalkeeper	SouthWest United
Kristyn Smart		Edmonton Strikers
Myia Wilkes	Defence	Calgary Rangers FC

=== British Columbia ===
Name	Position	Club
Alessia Azermadhi	Midfield	Whitecaps Girls Elite
Kathryn Baker	Defence	Whitecaps Girls Elite
Simmrin Dhaliwal	Midfield	Whitecaps Girls Elite
Jasmin Dhanda	Forward	U-18 Women's Whitecaps Residency Team
Samantha Dion	Midfield	Semiahmoo
Samantha Donald	Midfield	Whitecaps Girls Elite
Margaret Hadley	Forward	Whitecaps Girls Elite
Chelsea Harkins	Forward	Whitecaps Girls Elite
Manreet Johal	Midfield	Whitecaps Girls Elite
Rachel Jones	Midfield	Whitecaps Girls Elite
Seina Kashima	Forward	Whitecaps Girls Elite
Jasmine Mander	Midfield	Whitecaps Girls Elite
Nicola Mawson	Defence	Coastal FC
Julia McDonald	Goalkeeper	Whitecaps Girls Elite
Priya Sandhu	Goalkeeper	Whitecaps Girls Elite
Amanpreet Shergill	Defence	Whitecaps Girls Elite
Sessen Stevens	Forward	Whitecaps Girls Elite
Nicole Turney	Defence	Whitecaps Girls Elite

=== Manitoba ===
Name	Position	Club
Ashley Adams	Midfield	FC Northwest Winnipeg
Jamila Calvez	Forward	Team United
Kennadie Chaudhary	Midfield	WSA North Stars
Claire Driedger	Forward	Winnipeg South End United
Chelsea Dubiel	Forward	Phoenix SC Winnipeg
Jessie Harland	Defence	National Development Camp
Justina Jarmoszko	Goalkeeper	FC Northwest Winnipeg
Lauren Kressock	Midfield	Team United
Maeghan Lindsay	Midfield	Portage Trail
Emma MacLennan	Midfield	Team United
Sara MacLennan	Defence	WSA North Stars
Genny May	Midfield	Bonivital Flames Winnipeg
Madisann Relph	Forward	Bonivital Flames Winnipeg
Melanie Vryenhoek	Defence	Phoenix SC Winnipeg
Jenna White	Defence	National Development Camp
Madison Wilford	Goalkeeper	Team United
Amanada Wong	Forward	FC Northwest Winnipeg
Carli Vogel	Defence	FC Northwest Winnipeg

== Ranking games ==
August 7, 2013 Ranking	Alberta	1–0	Saskatchewan	Université de Sherbrooke
	Elissa Neff 49'; Olivia Chu (yellow card) 78'	Report

August 7, 2013 Ranking	Manitoba	1–0	Newfoundland	Université de Sherbrooke
	Kennadie Chaudhary 17'; Jenna White (red card) 87'	Report

August 8, 2013 Ranking	Saskatchewan	2–3	Newfoundland	Bishop's University
	Lauren Cubbon 60'; Rebecca Weckworth 65'	Report	Meghan Earle 28' 41'; Keisha Younge (yellow card) 46'; Emily Bailey 71'

August 8, 2013 Ranking	Alberta	1–0	Manitoba	Bishop's University
	Elissa Neff 5'; Nicole Lindsay (yellow card) 75'	Report

== Goal leaders ==
	Name	Goals	Province
1	Meghan Earle	6	Newfoundland
1	Noemi Mallet	6	New Brunswick
2	Sam Dion	5	British Columbia
2	Seina Kashima	5	New Brunswick
2	Andrea Petrina	5	Ontario
2	Amandine Pierre-Louis	5	Quebec
3	Sope Akindoju	4	Nova Scotia
3	Chloe Brennan	4	Nova Scotia
3	Valerie Sanderson	4	Quebec
