= Amedée Roy Stadium =

Baseball stadium in Sherbrooke, Quebec

- Stade Amedée-Roy
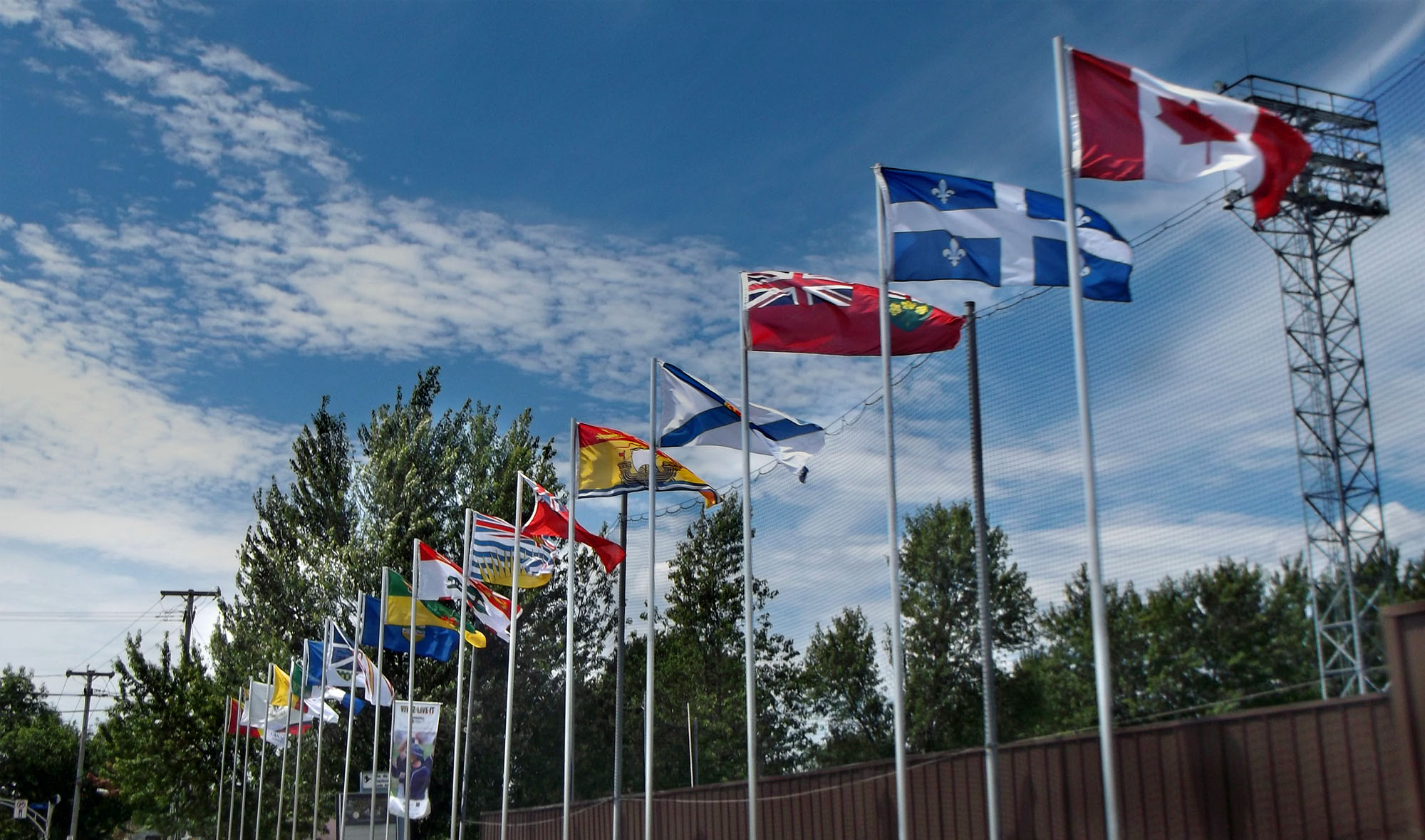
- Flag alignment at the stadium during the 2013 Canada games.
- Interactive map of Amedée Roy Stadium
- Address: 600, rue du Cégep; Sherbrooke, Quebec; J1E 3T6
- Coordinates: 45.413443°N 71.887896°W
- Owner: City of Sherbrooke
- Capacity: 1,000
- Surface: Grass
- Field size: Lines: 322 ft (98 m); Alleys: 342 ft (104 m); Center: 385 ft (117 m)

Tenants
- Sherbrooke Expos (LBMQ); Sherbrooke Athletiques (LBEQ) ( –2009); Montreal Royales (CBL) (2003)

Amedée Roy Stadium (French: Stade Amedée-Roy) is a baseball stadium in Sherbrooke, Quebec, Canada. It serves as the home ballpark of an amateur baseball team, the Sherbrooke Expos, and has hosted baseball games during events such as the 2002 World Junior Baseball Championship and the 2013 Canada Games.

== History ==
The current stadium is the third to be known Stade Amedée-Roy.

The first Stade Amedée-Roy was constructed in 1938. It burned down in September 1951, hours after the Sherbrooke Athletics completed their season by winning the league pennant. The city did not host a baseball team in 1952, while the stadium was rebuilt.

The second Stade Amedée-Roy was first used by the Sherbrooke Indians, an affiliate of the Cleveland Indians, from 1953 to 1955. It was later home to the Sherbrooke Pirates of the Double-A Eastern League from 1972 to 1973. The ballpark was razed at some point in the early 1980s.

== Tenants ==
Amedée Roy Stadium is the home field of the Sherbrooke Expos of the Ligue de Baseball Majeur du Québec (LBMQ).

It had been the home field of the Sherbrooke Athletiques BRP of the Ligue de Baseball Élite du Québec (LBEQ) until they relocated to Granby after the 2009 season.

In 2003, the Montreal Royales of the short-lived Canadian Baseball League played their only season at Amedée Roy Stadium, unable to find a suitable stadium in Montreal.

The stadium co-hosted the 2002 World Junior Baseball Championship with Julien Morin Stadium in nearby Coaticook.

The stadium was also used as a baseball venue for the 2013 Canada Games along with Julien Morin Stadium in Coaticook.
