= Welland Pirates =

- 1989–1994; Welland, Ontario

Minor league affiliations
- Class: Short Season A (1989–1994)
- League: New York–Penn League (1989–1994)
- Division: Stedler Division

Major league affiliations
- Team: Pittsburgh Pirates

Team data
- Name: Welland Pirates (1989–1994)
- Colors: Black, gold, white
- Ballpark: Welland Stadium (1989–1994); Burgar Park (before Welland Stadium was ready)

The Welland Pirates were a minor league baseball team located in Welland, Ontario. The team played in the Short-Season A classification New York–Penn League from 1989 to 1994, and were affiliated with the Pittsburgh Pirates. Their home stadium was Welland Stadium.

When the Welland Pirates relocated to Erie, Pennsylvania, in 1995, they were renamed the Erie SeaWolves, who exist today as a member of the Double-A Eastern League.

== Notable alumni ==
- Jeff Banister (1994, MGR) 2015 AL Manager of the Year
- Jason Christiansen (1991)
- Jason Johnson (1993)
- Tim Wakefield (1989) MLB All-Star; 200 MLB Wins
- U L Washington (1989, MGR)
- Tony Womack (1991) MLB All-Star
- Kevin Young (1991)

== Season records ==
Season	W	L	Finish (games behind leader)	Playoffs
1989	32	44	5th in Stedler Division (12 GB)	Out of playoffs
1990	36	42	3rd in Stedler Division (8.5 GB)	Out of playoffs
1991	30	47	6th in Stedler Division (20.5 GB)	Out of playoffs
1992	31	46	6th in Stedler Division (25.5 GB)	Out of playoffs
1993	35	42	5th in Stedler Division (17.5 GB)	Out of playoffs
1994	30	44	4th in Stedler Division (12 GB)	Out of playoffs
