= Julien Morin Stadium =

Baseball stadium in Coaticook, Quebec

- Stade Julien-Morin
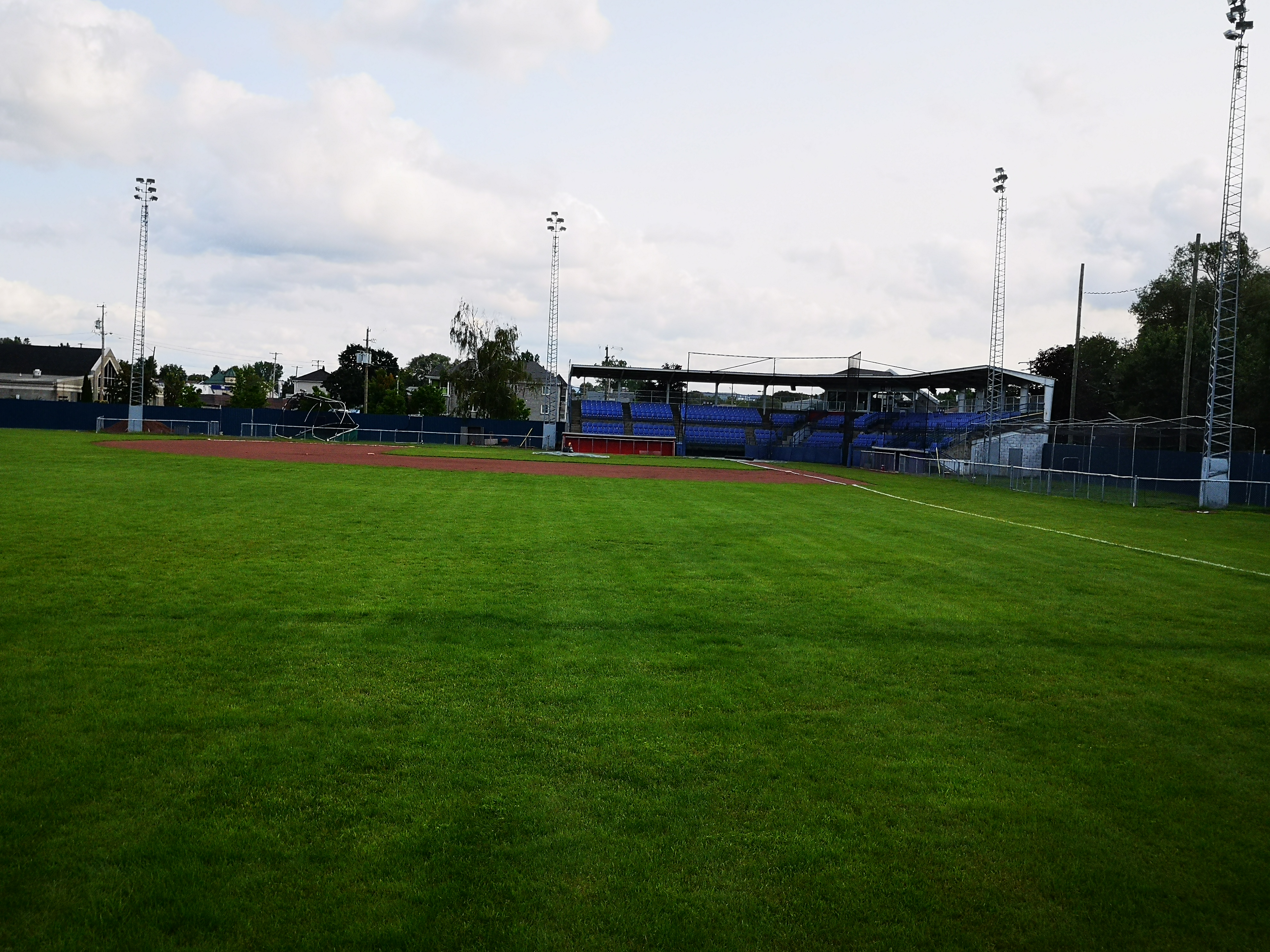

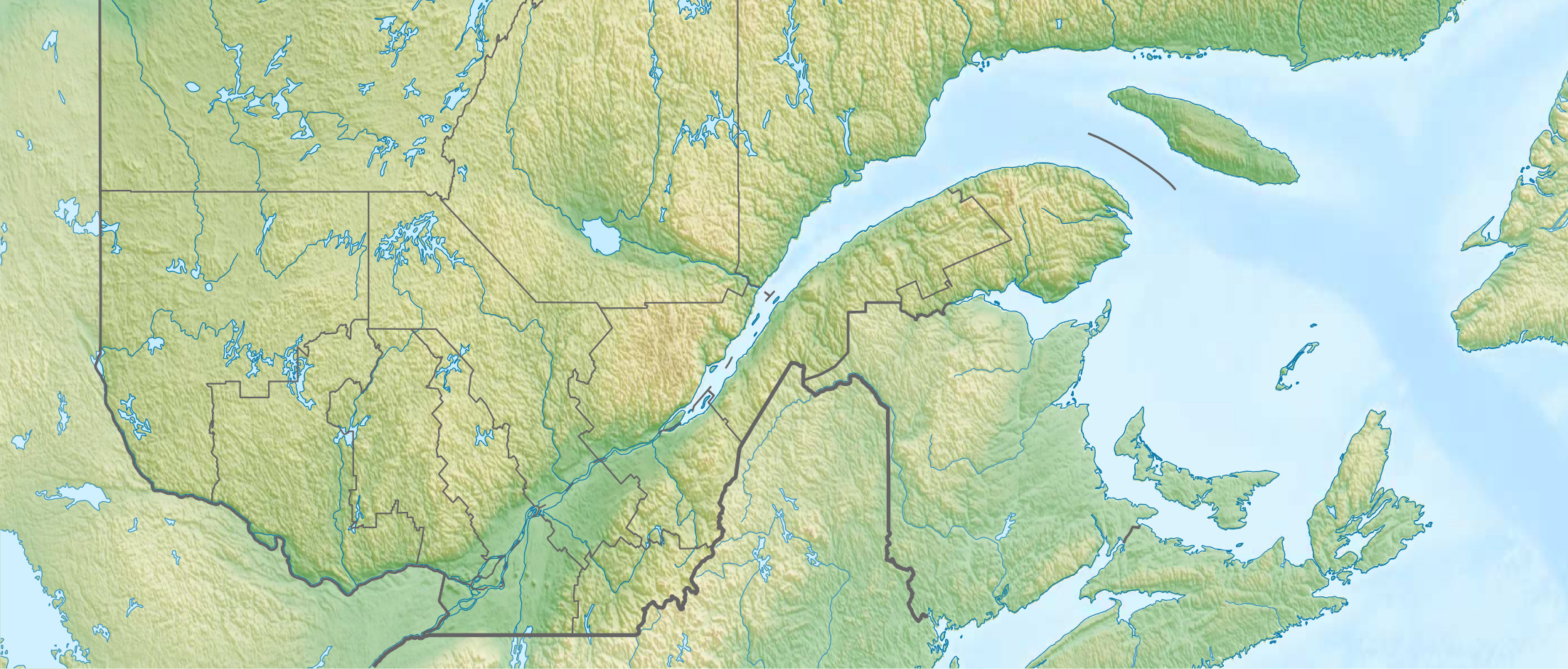
- Location within Quebec South Location within Quebec Location within Canada
- Interactive map of Julien Morin Stadium
- Location: Coaticook, Quebec, Canada
- Coordinates: 45.1345°N 71.8°W
- Owner: Town of Coaticook
- Surface: Grass
- Field size: 322' on the first and third base lines, 342 'in the aisles, 385' centre field

Construction
- Opened: 1963

Julien Morin Stadium (French: Stade Julien-Morin) is a baseball stadium in Coaticook, Quebec, Canada. Its address is 96 Rue Laurence. It was used as a baseball venue for the 2013 Canada Games along with Amedée Roy Stadium in Sherbrooke.

Julien Morin Stadium is the home field of the Coaticook Big Bill of the Ligue de Baseball Senior Élite du Québec.

== History ==
Originally known as Coaticook Stadium, it was built in 1963. The wooden seats located in the dugouts were purchased from the Montreal Royals. The stadium was originally home to the Coaticook Canadians of the Provincial League.

The provincial championships of Bantam-level were held at the stadium in 1973. The Sherbrooke A's of the Ligue de Baseball Junior Majeur moved to Coaticook for the 1981 and 1982 seasons while Amedée Roy Stadium was being renovated.

The Senior-level provincial championships were held in the stadium in 1991 and 1992, while the Senior-level national championships were held in 1993.

In 1995, 650 new bleachers were added as well as a new Bar-VIP section. Coaticook Stadium changed its name to Julien Morin Stadium in 1997.

Julien Morin Stadium co-hosted the 2002 World Junior Baseball Championship with Amedée Roy Stadium in nearby Sherbrooke. As a result of this event, a grass infield was added as well as a new warning-track in the outfield.

During 2010, the stadium was again renovated in preparation for the 2013 Canada Games. A new scoreboard, sound system, fence, and new bleachers were added.
