= Welland Stadium =

Baseball stadium in Welland, Ontario, Canada

Coordinates: 43.024753°N 79.246037°W

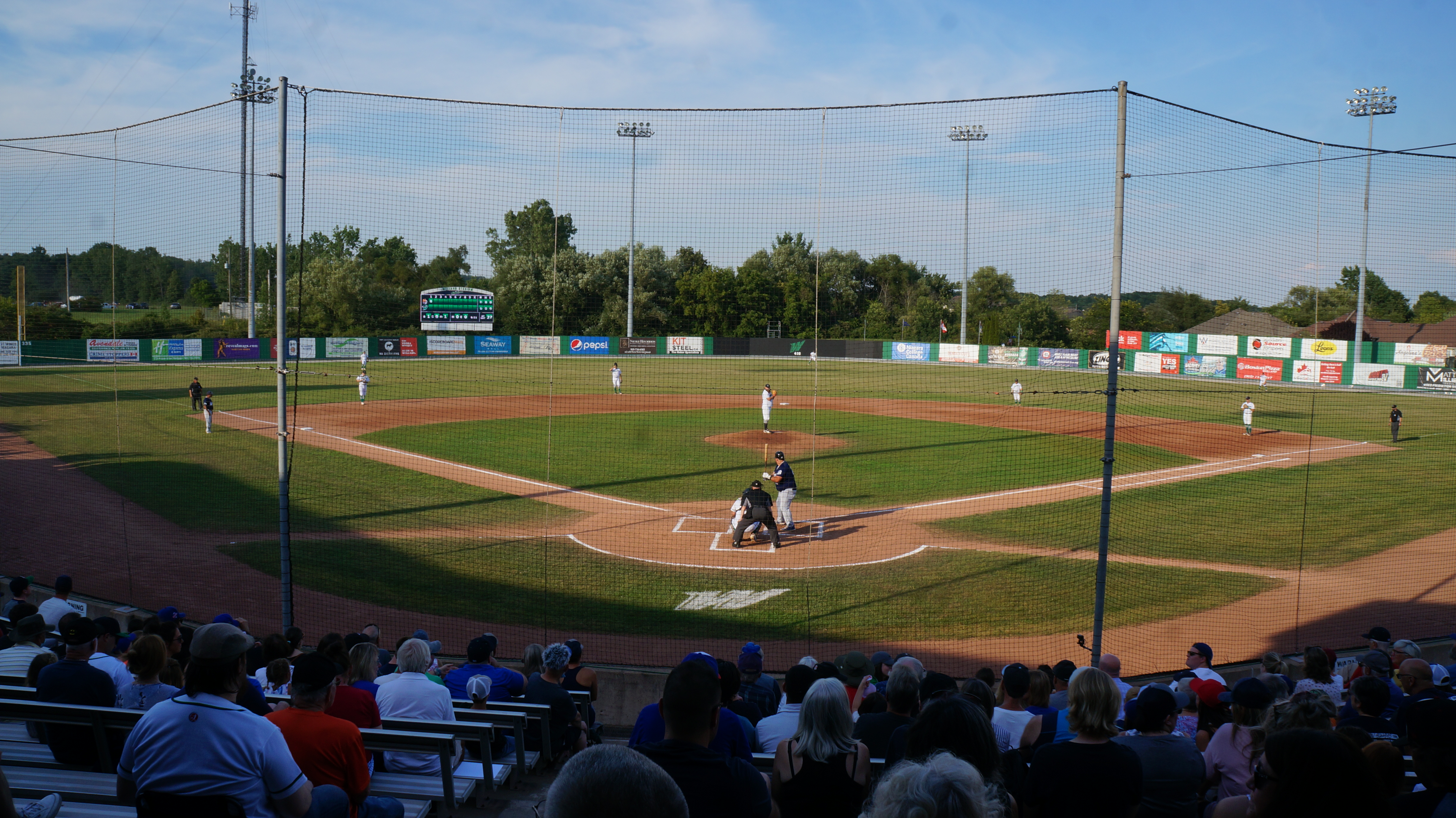
- Interactive map of Welland Stadium
- Location: Welland, Ontario, Canada
- Owner: The City of Welland
- Capacity: 3,248 (2,241 Seated)
- Surface: Grass

Construction
- Opened: 1989
- Renovated: 2023

Tenants
- Welland Jackfish (CBL) (2019-present); Welland Pirates (NYPL) (1989-1994); Welland Aqua-Ducks (NAL) (1995-1996); Niagara Stars (CBL) (2003)

Welland Stadium is a stadium located in Welland, Ontario, Canada. Primarily used for baseball, it has been the home of the Welland Jackfish of the Canadian Baseball League since 2019.

The ballpark first opened in 1989 and has a capacity of 3,248. Originally, it was the home of the Welland Pirates of the Short-Season A New York–Penn League who affiliated with the Pittsburgh Pirates, and the Niagara Stars of the original inception of the Canadian Baseball League in 2003. Welland Stadium hosted the 2024 Canadian Baseball League All-Star game.
