= Corey Baker (baseball) =

American baseball player (born 1989)

- Pitcher
- Born: November 23, 1989 (age 36); New York City, New York, U.S.
- Bats: Right Throws: Right
- Stats at Baseball Reference

Corey A. Baker (Hebrew: קוראי בייקר; born November 23, 1989) is an Israeli-American former professional baseball pitcher. He played in the St. Louis Cardinals organization, and formerly served as a video replay coordinator for the Minnesota Twins. He plays for the Israel National Baseball Team.

While in high school, Baker played three seasons for the Bayside Yankees traveling baseball team and had a 20–1 record. He pitched in college for the University of Pittsburgh Panthers, was named in 2010 to the All-Big East First Team, and to the ABCA/Rawlings All-East Region First Team, and ended his college career as the university's all-time career wins leader, with 24.

Baker was drafted by the St. Louis Cardinals in the 49th round of the 2011 Major League Baseball draft. In 2013, he was a Midwest League All Star with the Peoria Chiefs. In May 2016, he was named Texas League Pitcher of the Week while pitching for the Double-A Springfield Cardinals.

In September 2016 Baker pitched as a starter for Israel at the 2017 World Baseball Classic qualifier, winning his only start. He also pitched for Team Israel at the 2017 World Baseball Classic main tournament. In October 2018, he became a dual Israeli citizen. Baker is competing on the Israel national baseball team for qualification for the 2020 Olympics.

== Early and personal life ==
Baker was born in New York, New York, to Mark (a TV producer, who grew up in Brooklyn) and Leah Baker, and was raised in New City, New York. He is Jewish, and grew up attending a Reform congregation in New City, where he attended Hebrew school twice a week and had his bar mitzvah. Baker played in the Maccabi Games in the 11-to-12 age group. He now lives in Seattle, Washington.

In October 2018 he became a dual Israeli citizen, partly to help Israel's baseball team make the 2020 Olympics.

== High school ==
Baker attended Clarkstown South High School in West Nyack, New York, where for three years he pitched and played second base. He was a two-time all-league selection as a junior and senior, and named all-county, all-section, and runner-up Section Player of the Year as a senior, and threw a no-hitter in his final season. He graduated in 2007. He also played three seasons of summer baseball for the Bayside Yankees traveling baseball team, for whom he had a 20–1 record.

== College career ==
Baker then pitched for the University of Pittsburgh Panthers, attending the school on a partial baseball scholarship, while majoring in history and minoring in political science. As a sophomore, in March 2009 he was named Big East Pitcher of the Week. As a junior, in 2010 he was 11-3 (with his 11 wins the third-most in the country) and was named to the All-Big East First Team, and to the ABCA/Rawlings All-East Region First Team. He ended his career with the school as the Pittsburgh Panthers' all-time career wins leader, with 24, and fourth all-time in school history with 221 strikeouts.

He plans to eventually return to school to study for a master's degree in Sports Management.

== Professional career ==
Baker was drafted by the St. Louis Cardinals in the 49th round of the 2011 Major League Baseball draft (a round that no longer exists, as the following year the MLB draft was limited to 40 rounds), and signed for a small bonus. He made his professional debut in 2011 with the Batavia Muckdogs of the Low-A New York-Pennsylvania League. Baker started the 2013 season playing for the Peoria Chiefs of the Single-A Midwest League where he was an All Star, and then pitched for the Palm Beach Cardinals of the High-A Florida State League, before joining the Springfield Cardinals of the Double-A Texas League at the end of the season. In 2014, Baker pitched for Palm Beach and Springfield, and in a combined 37 games (five starts), he compiled a 6–2 record with a 2.87 ERA and two saves.

On August 31, 2015, Baker pitched his first career shutout for Springfield. That year, after leading all Springfield pitchers with 88 strikeouts as he split time between the starting rotation and the bullpen, he led Springfield to the Texas League playoffs. Springfield pitching coach Jason Simontacchi said of Baker that he:

can pitch as a closer ... middle relief, and as a starter. Baker throws strikes. ... He's got a super sinker, when it is right, it is very good, and I think that pitch could play at the big-league level. His changeup is a swing and miss pitch, can throw it in any count, and he mixes in a slider towards righties.

Pitching for Springfield again the following season, he was named Texas League Pitcher of the Week for April 25-May 1, 2016. Baker then ended the season pitching as a starter for the Memphis Redbirds of the Triple-A Pacific Coast League. Baker was a non-roster invitee to the Cardinals major league spring training camp in 2017. He began the season pitching in relief as a closer for Springfield. At mid-season, he was a Texas League All-Star. On July 13, 2017, Baker was released from Cardinals organization after having spent seven years in their minor league system. Pitching for the Springfield Cardinals in 2017, in 40 innings over 25 relief appearances he had a 2.48 ERA and led the team with six saves, in six save opportunities.

In the 2017–18 season, Baker pitched for the Leones del Caracas of the Venezuelan Winter League, where he was 1–0 with a 3.74 ERA in 15 games.

== Post-playing career ==
At the start of the 2018 season, Baker retired as a player. He joined the Minnesota Twins as their replay coordinator for the 2018 season.

== Team Israel ==
Baker pitched for Israel at the 2017 World Baseball Classic qualifier. As part of demonstrating that Baker was Jewish and therefore eligible to pitch for Team Israel, his family sent the team a bar mitzvah photo of Baker at age 13, wearing a yarmulke and dark suit, and holding a torah. Baker's only appearance in the tournament was a start in the second game against Brazil. Israel won the game 1–0, advancing to the finals, and Baker was credited with the win. Baker threw 83 pitches over 5 shutout innings, while giving up a hit, three walks, and striking out six.

Baker pitched as the # 2 starter for Team Israel at the 2017 World Baseball Classic in the main tournament, in March 2017.

Baker is competing on the Israel national baseball team for qualification for the 2020 Olympics. He pitched in one game in relief as the team played in the 2019 European Baseball Championship - B-Pool in early July 2019 in Blagoevgrad, Bulgaria, winning all of its games and advancing to the playoffs against Team Lithuania in the 2019 Playoff Series at the end of July 2019 for the last qualifying spot for the 2019 European Baseball Championship. He was 0–0 with a 4.50 ERA in two innings.
