= Pedro Álvarez (baseball) =

Dominican baseball player (born 1987)

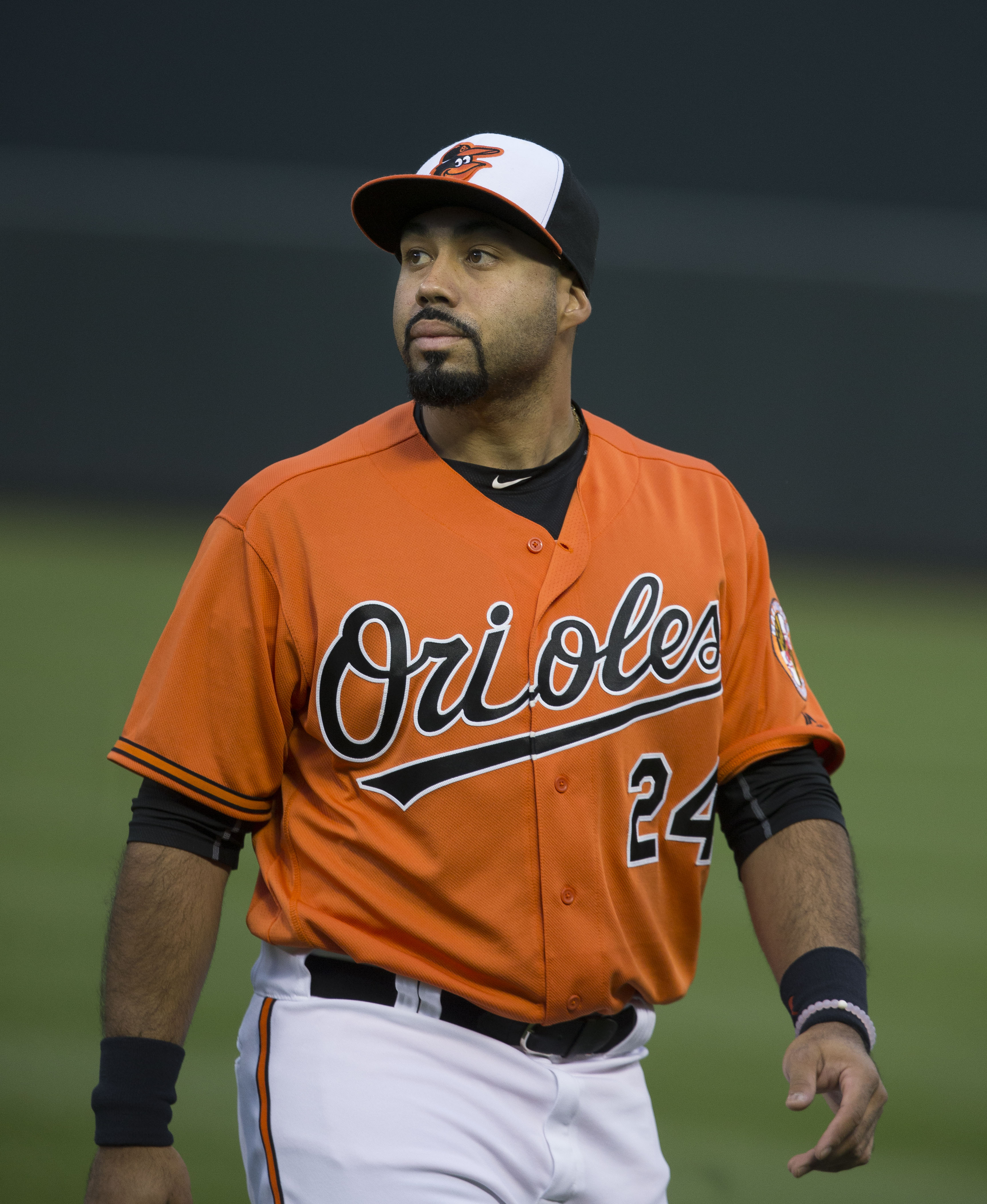
- Álvarez with the Baltimore Orioles in 2016
- Third baseman
- Born: February 6, 1987 (age 39); Santo Domingo, Dominican Republic
- Batted: Left Threw: Right

MLB debut
- June 16, 2010, for the Pittsburgh Pirates

Last MLB appearance
- June 15, 2018, for the Baltimore Orioles

MLB statistics
- Batting average: .236
- Home runs: 162
- Runs batted in: 472
- Stats at Baseball Reference

Teams
- Pittsburgh Pirates (2010–2015); Baltimore Orioles (2016–2018)

Career highlights and awards
- All-Star (2013); Silver Slugger Award (2013); NL home run leader (2013)
Medals
Men's baseball
Representing United States
Pan American Games
Silver medal – second place	2007 Rio de Janeiro	Team
Baseball World Cup
Gold medal – first place	2009 Nettuno	Team
World University Baseball Championship
Gold medal – first place	2006 Havana	Team

Pedro Manuel Álvarez Jr. (born February 6, 1987), is a Dominican-American former professional baseball designated hitter and infielder. He played in Major League Baseball (MLB) for the Pittsburgh Pirates and Baltimore Orioles.

During his playing career, Álvarez stood 6 feet 3 inches (1.91 m) and weighed 250 pounds (110 kg). A third baseman until late 2014, Álvarez transitioned to first base for the Pirates in 2015, and in 2016 became a designated hitter for the Orioles. On June 19, 2018, he was designated for assignment by the Orioles.

== Early life ==
Álvarez was born in the Dominican Republic to Pedro and Luz Álvarez. As a young boy, he grew up in the Washington Heights neighborhood in the New York City borough of Manhattan.

== High school career ==
Álvarez first attended the Mott Hall School for gifted and talented students in Morningside Heights, where he was an A student. He then attended the prestigious Horace Mann School in the Bronx, choosing a school known for its high-level education but not for its sports programs. Álvarez holds numerous baseball records there, most notably home runs, batting average, on-base percentage, slugging percentage, and RBIs. Álvarez was named Athlete of the Year his senior season. Though he attended a private school, Álvarez's abilities attracted the attention of scouts throughout the New York City area, especially after he led his club team, the Bayside Yankees, to a national title in 2005. In recognition of his success, Louisville Slugger crowned him the Player of the Year in New York and also named him to its All-America team.

== Vanderbilt career ==
After graduating from high school, Álvarez was drafted in the 14th round of the 2005 Major League Baseball draft by the Boston Red Sox. Though offered a substantial signing bonus, Álvarez instead chose to play college baseball for the Vanderbilt Commodores of the Southeastern Conference. Álvarez started slowly at Vanderbilt but eventually became an integral member of the lineup, setting a single-season school record in home runs (22). This production earned Álvarez National Freshman of the Year honors from several publications, including Baseball America. Álvarez was then selected to the USA National team, leading the team in batting average. Baseball America ranked him as the second-best pro prospect on the squad. In addition, Sports Illustrated ranked him as the best pro prospect on the team and said that he was the "early favorite to be drafted first in 2008", due to his impressive performance over the summer and as a freshman.

Before the 2007 season began, Álvarez was named to the watchlist for the SEC and National Player of the Year awards. He was also chosen as a pre-season first team All-American. During the season, Álvarez hit .397 with 17 home runs, 65 RBI, 72 runs scored, an on-base percentage of .467, and a slugging percentage of .706 for the 51–11 Commodores. Vanderbilt captured its first ever SEC regular season championship, and Álvarez was named Tournament MVP.

Álvarez was invited back to Team USA after his strong performance in 2006. He led the team in homers, RBI, batting average, hits, and slugging percentage.

== Professional career ==
=== Pittsburgh Pirates ===
==== Draft and minor leagues ====
The Pittsburgh Pirates selected Álvarez in the first round, with the second overall selection, in the 2008 MLB draft. He agreed to a $6 million minor league contract with the Pirates on August 15, minutes before the deadline, but did not immediately sign it. He was placed on the restricted list after the Major League Baseball Players Association filed a grievance against Major League Baseball over draft picks being signed minutes after the August 15 deadline. On September 22, Álvarez agreed to renegotiated terms on a four-year major league contract at $6.4 million.

In 2009, Álvarez attended Spring training with the Pirates and was assigned to the minor league's spring training on March 16, 2009. After playing several months with the Pirates High-A affiliate, Lynchburg Hillcats, Álvarez was assigned to Double-A Altoona Curve in late June. Álvarez led the Pirates organization in home runs and RBI with 27 and 95 respectively. He also batted .288 with an .917 OPS.

==== 2010 ====
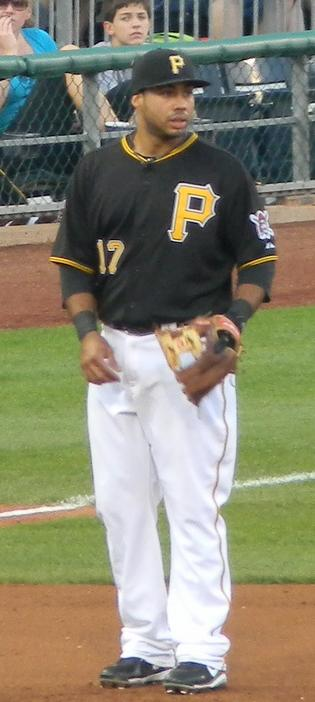
Álvarez at third base

Álvarez started the 2010 season with the Pirates Triple-A affiliate, the Indianapolis Indians, as the 8th-best prospect in Baseball America's 2010 rankings. In 66 games with the Indians, he hit .277 with 13 home runs, 53 RBI, and 4 stolen bases.

Álvarez was called up to the MLB on June 16, 2010, and made his MLB debut against John Danks of the Chicago White Sox. He went 0-for-2 with a walk, a strikeout, and a run scored. His first MLB hit came against the Cleveland Indians on June 19, an RBI double off Indians starter David Huff. The following several weeks of his career did not go so smoothly, however. He struck out at least once in each of his first 10 games, capped off by a 4-strikeout game in a 14–4 loss to the Oakland Athletics on June 25. Pirates manager John Russell then gave him a day off. His first MLB home run came against the Philadelphia Phillies on July 3, 2010, a solo shot to left field off of Phillies starter Kyle Kendrick. Following his benching, Álvarez responded with an eight-game hitting streak from June 28 – July 6 that included 2 home runs, 3 runs scored and 4 RBI.

Álvarez recorded his first MLB career multi-homer game on July 20, 2010, against the Milwaukee Brewers. He hit a grand slam in the first inning off Brewers starter Dave Bush and then followed with a solo home run in the following inning. He finished the game 2-for-4 with two runs and five RBIs. He hit two home runs again the next night against the Brewers, going 3-for-5 with 3 RBIs. The home runs came against Milwaukee starter Randy Wolf and reliever Kameron Loe. After the game, Álvarez had raised his batting average over 60 points, from .197 to .259, in just 11 days. "Obviously, those first few weeks, it's a million miles an hour, and as time goes on you get used to it a little bit more and more." said Álvarez of his early struggles. "It's very fun to go out there and play some good baseball and come out winning. It makes it that much better when you have a good day that you can celebrate with your teammates."

On August 7, 2010, Pedro hit a walk-off 3 run home run against the Colorado Rockies closer Huston Street.

Álvarez was named National League Player of the Week for September 20–26 for his performances. He finished the week 10-for-24 (.417) with 2 home runs and 13 RBIs. Álvarez continued his hot streak, going 4-for-5 with 5 RBIs on September 30 against the Florida Marlins while raising his season batting average 8 points from .249 to .257. Álvarez finished the season by winning the NL Rookie of the Month Award for September, hitting .311 and leading all Major League rookies with 26 RBIs in his final 27 games.

==== 2011 ====
Álvarez compiled a .208 batting average and a .587 OPS in 36 games. On May 21, 2011, Álvarez was placed on the 15-day disabled list. After being reinstated from the DL on July 9, 2011, he was optioned to the AAA Indianapolis Indians. For the season, with the Pirates he batted .191/.272/.289 in 235 at bats.

==== 2012 ====
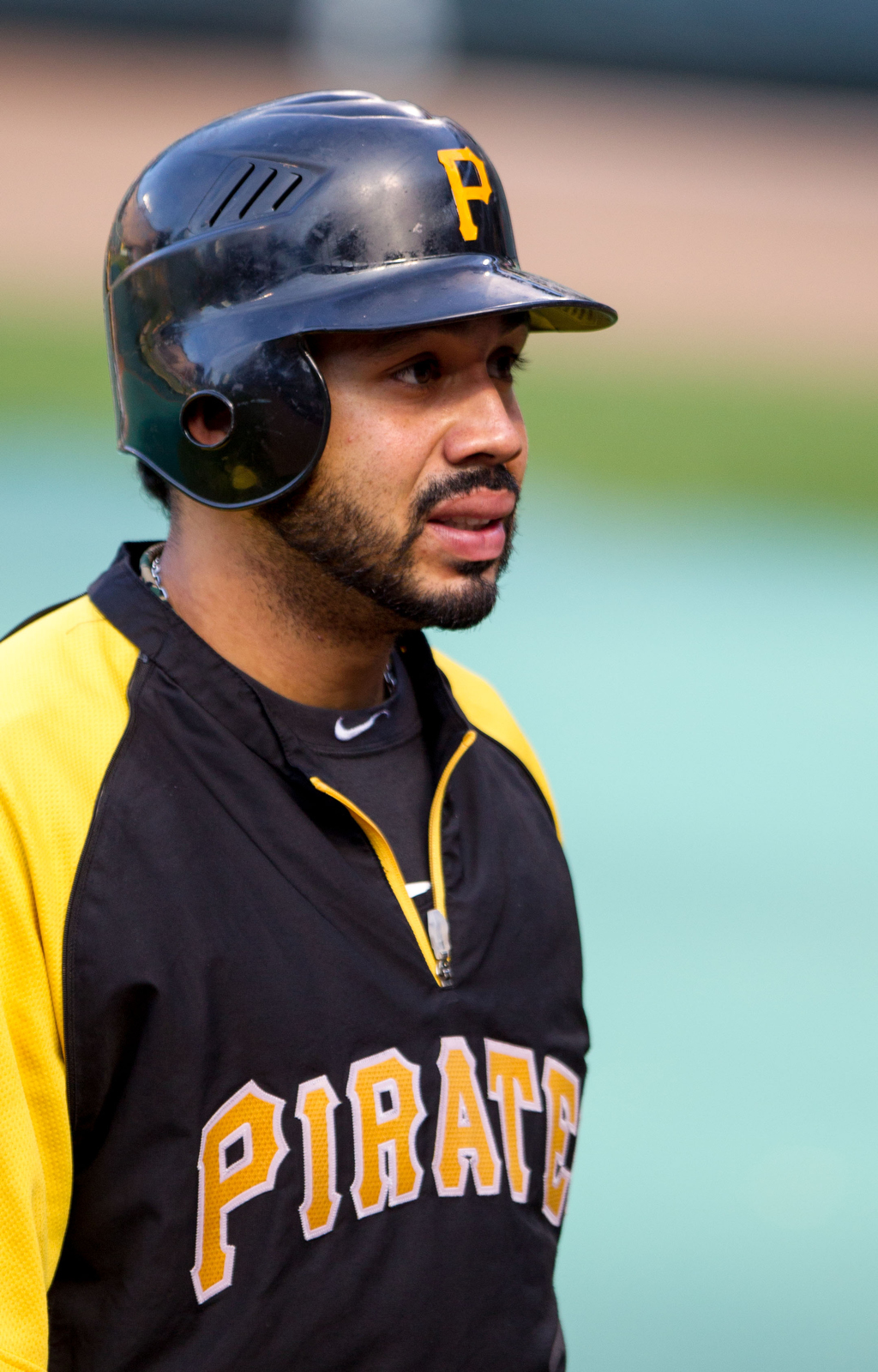
Álvarez with the Pittsburgh Pirates in 2012

Álvarez decided not to spend the 2011–12 offseason playing winter league ball. After the first nine games of the 2012 season, he struck out 13 times in his first 27 at-bats. In an interleague series against the Cleveland Indians, Álvarez hit two home runs in back-to-back games on June 16 and 17, making him only the second Pirates' player with multi-home run games in back-to-back games since 1918, with Ralph Kiner being the other player. Álvarez hit a go-ahead home run in the 19th inning against the St. Louis Cardinals on August 19, the longest game in the majors to that point in the season and tied for the longest in terms of time at 6 hours, 7 minutes. Álvarez hit a 469-ft home run, the longest hit by a Pittsburgh Pirates batter in the history of PNC Park to that time, in a two-homer game against the St. Louis Cardinals on August 28. For the season, he batted .244/.317/.467, was second in the National League with 180 strikeouts, and led all NL players with 27 errors at third base.

==== 2013 ====
Álvarez was selected to the National League All-Star team in 2013. He also participated in the Home Run Derby, where he hit six home runs. On September 13, he hit an inside-the-park home run. He finished the 2013 season with 36 home runs, tied with Paul Goldschmidt for most in the National League and third-most in the majors, and 100 RBI, which was tied for fifth-most in the NL. On October 9, 2013, he became the first player in baseball history to record an RBI in each of his first 6 postseason games. In Game 3 of the NLDS vs. the St. Louis Cardinals, Álvarez had the game-winning RBI in the 8th inning that gave the Pirates a 2–1 series lead. For the season, he batted .233/.296/.473, led the National League in strikeouts with 186, and led all NL third basemen with 27 errors. He also won the National League Silver Slugger Award for third basemen.

==== 2014 ====
Álvarez committed an MLB-leading 24 errors by August 3. As a result, Álvarez was removed from the everyday lineup and utility player Josh Harrison received the starting job at third base for an indefinite time period. This led to the Pirates' considering a move for Álvarez from third base to first base in order to keep his offensive capabilities in the lineup. On August 18, Álvarez made his first Major League appearance at first base against the Atlanta Braves at PNC Park.

The Pirates announced on September 10 that Alvarez had been diagnosed with a stress fracture in his left foot stemming from an injury he sustained in-game on August 26. He missed the remainder of the regular season, and was left off the Wild Card Game roster against the San Francisco Giants. For the season, he batted .231/.312/.405, and for the third season in a row led all NL players in errors, with 25 at third base.

==== 2015 ====
In the 2015 season, Álvarez transitioned to first base full-time. Álvarez played 150 games in 2015, hitting .243/.318/.469 with 27 home runs and 77 RBIs. However, he also made 23 errors in 124 games at first base, leading the National League, including a major-league-leading 19 fielding errors.

On December 2, 2015, Álvarez was non-tendered by the Pirates, making him a free agent for the first time in his career.

=== Baltimore Orioles (2016–2018) ===
On March 10, 2016, the Baltimore Orioles signed Álvarez to a one-year, $5.75 million deal, which also included performance bonuses between $1.25 million and $1.5 million.

Álvarez was hitless in his first 12 at-bats, batting only .182 over his first 15 games. His struggles continued, as he hit just .194 through the end of May while playing in 34 games. In June, Álvarez raised his average up to .230. At the All-Star break, he slashed .249/.320/.462 while hitting nine homers and driving in 26 runs. On September 2 he hit his 20th home run of the season, becoming the sixth Oriole to hit 20+ homers on the year. It was his second career home run to land on Eutaw Street. For the season, he batted .249/.322/.504.

In 2017, Álvarez only had 32 at-bats with the Orioles, and made four errors in nine chances at third base. With their AAA affiliate, the Norfolk Tides, he batted .239/.294/.442.

On February 25, 2018, Álvarez re-signed with the Orioles on a minor league contract. He had his contract purchased on March 29. On June 19, he was designated for assignment; at the time, his slash line was .180/.283/.414. Alvarez declared free agency on October 9, 2018.

=== Miami Marlins ===
On December 3, 2018, Álvarez signed a minor league deal with the Miami Marlins. He was released on March 25, 2019, after opting out of his contract.

== Post-playing career ==
On February 4, 2022, Álvarez was hired by the Milwaukee Brewers as an assistant to the baseball operations team.

Álvarez now serves at Horace Mann School, his alma mater, as first Director of Wellness, in the Athletics Department.

== Awards and honors ==
- 2013 National League Silver Slugger
- 2013 National League All-Star
- 2013 National League home run title
- 2013 Major League Baseball National League Player of the Week for the period ending June 23
- 2010 National League Rookie of the Month for the month of September
- 2010 National League Player of the Week for the week of September 20–26
- 2009 All-Star Futures Game starter
- 2007 Golden Spikes Award finalist
- 2007 Baseball America First Team All-American
- 2007 National Collegiate Baseball Writers Association First Team All-American
- 2007 American Baseball Coaches Association Second Team All-American
- 2006 Baseball America National Freshman of the Year
- 2006 Baseball America First Team All-American

== Personal life ==
Álvarez has been married to his wife, Keli, since 2011. Keli is the daughter of Milwaukee Brewers manager Pat Murphy.

Álvarez earned his bachelor's degree in medicine, health and society from Vanderbilt in 2022.
