= Jody Davis (baseball) =

American baseball player (born 1956)

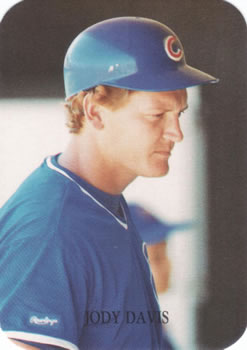
- Davis with the Cubs in 1987
- Catcher
- Born: November 12, 1956 (age 69); Gainesville, Georgia, U.S.
- Batted: Right Threw: Right

MLB debut
- April 21, 1981, for the Chicago Cubs

Last MLB appearance
- May 13, 1990, for the Atlanta Braves

MLB statistics
- Batting average: .245
- Home runs: 127
- Runs batted in: 490
- Stats at Baseball Reference

Teams
- Chicago Cubs (1981–1988); Atlanta Braves (1988–1990)

Career highlights and awards
- 2× All-Star (1984, 1986); Gold Glove Award (1986); Chicago Cubs Hall of Fame

Jody Richard Davis (born November 12, 1956) is an American former professional baseball player and minor league manager. He was a catcher in Major League Baseball with the Chicago Cubs and Atlanta Braves from 1981 to 1990. A two-time National League All-Star, Davis won the 1986 National League Gold Glove Award.

== Major League career ==
Davis was selected by the New York Mets in the third round of the 1976 Major League Baseball draft. In 1979, the Mets traded him to the St. Louis Cardinals and in 1980 he was drafted from the Cardinals by the Chicago Cubs in the Rule 5 draft.

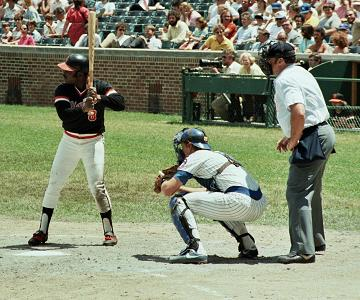
Jody Davis catching during a Giants-Cubs game in 1981, his rookie year.

Davis made his major league debut on 21 April 1981 at the age of 24, and became the Cubs starting catcher as a rookie. In the earlier years of his career, Davis showed promise on offense and became a fan favorite among Cubs fans. In his second full season, 1983, he set what would turn out to be career highs with 151 games played, a batting average of .271 and 24 home runs. Davis also had 84 RBI in the same season. In 1984, he set a career high with 94 RBI and earned his first All-Star selection, as the Cubs won the National League Eastern Division title, their first title of any kind since 1945. In the only post-season appearance of his career, Davis hit .389 with 2 doubles, 2 home runs, 6 RBI and an .833 slugging percentage in the 1984 National League Championship Series as the Cubs were defeated by the San Diego Padres in a five-game series.

Davis possessed a strong throwing arm and finished second among National League catchers in caught stealing percentage in 1981. In 1982, he finished second among National League catchers, behind Gold Glove winner Gary Carter, in Total Zone Runs, and he finished eighth among all National League players in Defensive Wins Above Replacement (Defensive WAR). However, Davis slumped defensively in 1983, leading the league in passed balls with 21 and finishing second in errors with 13. In 1984, with the help of bullpen coach and former catcher Johnny Oates, Davis began to regain his form as a defensive asset. In 1985, his 1.6 Defensive WAR once again placed him among the top 10 defensive players in the league. In 1986, Davis turned in a stellar defensive campaign. He led National League catchers in putouts, assists, and baserunners caught stealing, and he finished second to Bob Brenly in fielding percentage. His 21 Total Zone Runs and 3.3 Defensive WAR led not only National League catchers but indeed all National League players. When Davis broke the 100 assists barrier in 1986, he joined Johnny Bench, Jim Sundberg, Gary Carter and Tony Peña as the only catchers to have more than 100 assists in a season since the end of the Second World War. His defensive excellence helped earn him his second All-Star Game appearance and garnered the Gold Glove Award.

Around the same time, his offense started slipping. In 1986, Davis hit 21 home runs but struck out 110 times. His batting average slipped to .229 in 1988 and, he was replaced by rookie catcher Damon Berryhill, before being traded with three games left of the season to his hometown Atlanta Braves. Davis played only two games with the Braves that year, but he stayed in Atlanta for one full season and one partial season. With the Braves, he was also seeing occasional action as a first baseman. In 1989, Davis batted .169 with Atlanta in 78 games. In 1990, he played in 12 games, going 2-for-28 for a batting average of .071. Davis was granted a release by the Braves, after which time he signed a minor league contract with the Detroit Tigers organization (AAA Toledo Mud Hens). He played only 3 games for the Mud Hens before deciding to retire at the age of 33.

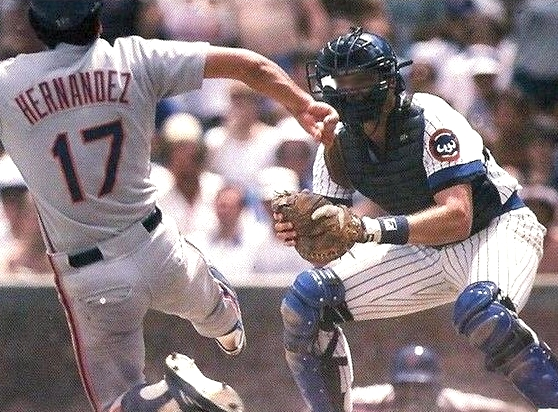
Davis (right) defending home plate for the Cubs in 1987

== Career statistics ==
In a ten-year Major League Baseball career, Davis played in 1,082 games, accumulating 877 hits in 3,585 at bats for a .245 career batting average along with 127 home runs and 490 runs batted in. He ended his career with a .987 fielding percentage as a catcher. On 15 April 1987, Davis hit the 4,000th home run in the history of Wrigley Field.

He holds the all-time MLB record for number of baserunners caught stealing at 89, set in 1986. In 2026, he is set to be inducted into the Cubs Hall of Fame.

== Managing career ==
Davis managed the Calgary Outlaws of the Canadian Baseball League to a 24–13 record during the league's only season (2003). Since the league suspended operations at its All-Star break, the Outlaws were awarded the Jenkins Cup. Following his time in Canada, Davis was a minor league manager and roving catching instructor in the Chicago Cubs system, serving as manager of the Peoria Chiefs in 2006, Daytona Cubs of the Florida State League in 2007 and 2008 when his team won the Florida State League championship. He also managed the Boise Hawks in the Cubs system in 2010.

During the following off-season, he managed in the Venezuelan Winter League where he was named Manager of the Year.

In 2017 and 2018 he managed the Pensacola Blue Wahoos (AA) and in 2019 he managed the Louisville Bats (AAA), both in the Cincinnati Reds organization.

He was the hitting instructor in the San Diego Padres organization in 2015 and 2016.

== Personal life ==
Davis has been married two times and has three children from his first marriage: Joshua, Ashley, and Jeremy. He is the second-cousin of former Major League Baseball player Wade Davis. He graduated from North Hall High School and attended Middle Georgia College before being drafted. He was included in the inaugural class of the North Hall High School Athletics Hall of Fame, created in 2023. The baseball field at the school has also been named after him.

| Preceded by Buddy Bailey | Daytona Cubs manager 2007–2008 | Succeeded by Buddy Bailey |
