= Pete LaCock =

American baseball player (born 1952)

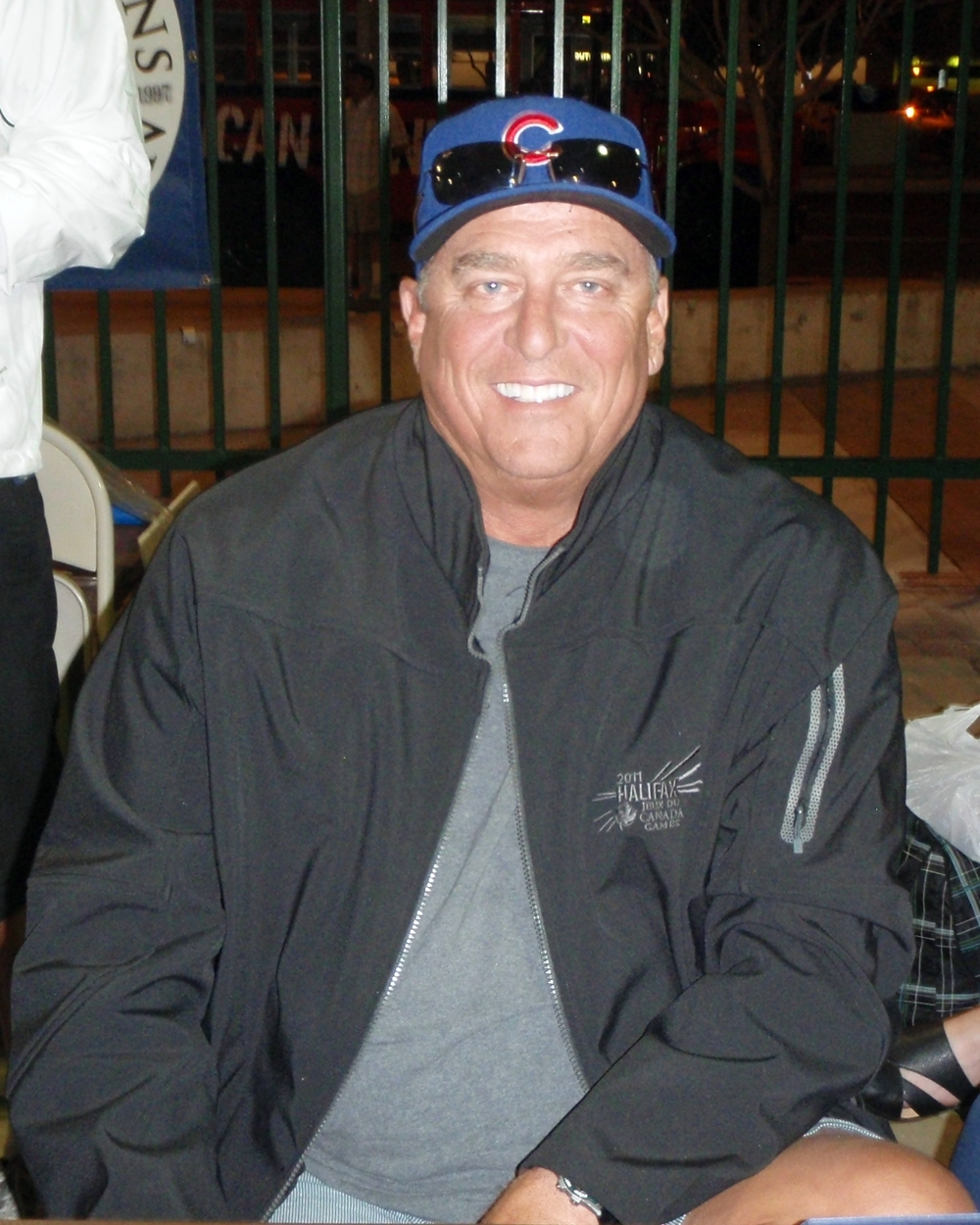
- LaCock in 2011
- First baseman
- Born: January 17, 1952 (age 74); Burbank, California, U.S.
- Batted: Left Threw: Left

MLB debut
- September 6, 1972, for the Chicago Cubs

Last MLB appearance
- October 5, 1980, for the Kansas City Royals

MLB statistics
- Batting average: .257
- Home runs: 27
- Runs batted in: 224
- Stats at Baseball Reference

Teams
- Chicago Cubs (1972–1976); Kansas City Royals (1977–1980); Yokohama Taiyo Whales (1981)

Ralph Pierre "Pete" LaCock Jr. (born January 17, 1952) is an American former Major League Baseball first baseman and outfielder. He batted and threw left-handed. In 1975, LaCock hit the only grand slam of his career during the final appearance of St. Louis Cardinals pitcher Bob Gibson.

== Career ==
LaCock was selected by the Chicago Cubs in the first round (20th pick overall) of the 1970 January Draft-Regular Phase out of William Howard Taft Charter High School. His minor league career included leading the Texas League with 84 bases on balls while playing for the San Antonio Missions in 1971 and with 13 triples and 93 bases on balls while playing for the Midland Cubs in 1972.

Due to LaCock's success in the minor league system, he was promoted to the major leagues, where he played for the Cubs (1972–1976) and the Kansas City Royals (1977–1980). In 1981, he played in Japan for the Yokohama Taiyo Whales.

Over nine seasons (715 games), LaCock hit 27 home runs with 224 RBI and a batting average of .257. He was a good fielder at both first base and in the outfield, but never became an everyday player. LaCock was often used as a pinch hitter and/or defensive replacement, and sometimes as a designated hitter. He was granted free agency on October 24, 1980, though he never played another major league game.

In 1989, LaCock played for the St. Petersburg Pelicans and Winter Haven Super Sox of the Senior Professional Baseball Association.

LaCock is perhaps best known for a famous, and possibly apocryphal, story involving Hall of Famer Bob Gibson. In 1975, during Gibson's final game, LaCock hit a grand slam home run, becoming the last hitter to get a base hit off Gibson. Gibson retired soon afterwards. Years later, Gibson faced LaCock in an Old-Timers' Day, and he allegedly beaned him in retaliation and shouted out, "I've been waiting years to do that!"

=== Coaching ===
LaCock managed the Niagara Stars of the Canadian Baseball League in 2003. After serving as the hitting coach for St. Joe Blacksnakes (now defunct) of the American Association of Independent Professional Baseball during the 2007 season, he was hired in 2008 as hitting coach for the Lincoln Saltdogs of the American Association, resigning his position in mid-July. Since then, LaCock has journeyed as a hitting coach with the Tucson Toros of the Golden Baseball League in 2009, the North American League Schaumburg Flyers in 2010, and the Kevin Costner owned Lake County Fielders (also of the North American League) in 2011.

In 2012, LaCock served as head coach of the Cronulla Sharks baseball club, in the New South Wales major league competition in Sydney, Australia. In 2012, he managed the Prescott Montezuma Federals of the Freedom Pro Baseball League.

== Personal life ==
LaCock is the son of Hollywood Squares host Peter Marshall, as well as the nephew of actress Joanne Dru. Since his retirement from baseball, LaCock has competed in several marathons and triathlons, many of which raise funds for the Leukemia Society of America.
