= Ligue de Baseball Majeur du Québec =

Senior amateur baseball league

Quebec Major Baseball League
- Sport: Baseball
- Founded: 2002
- No. of teams: 11
- Country: Canada
- Most titles: Thetford Mines Blue Sox (8)
- Website: Official website

The Quebec Major Baseball League (QMBL; French: Ligue de Baseball Majeur du Québec, LBMQ) is a senior (23 and over) amateur baseball league in the Canadian province of Quebec. It is the highest level of non-professional baseball in the province of Quebec.

== History ==
The league is the result of the 2002 amalgamation of several men's senior elite level baseball teams in the province of Quebec. The league from Montreal, the Ligue de Baseball Senior de Montréal, merged with those of the Quebec City and Trois-Rivières areas. There were originally ten teams, five from the Montreal area, four from Quebec City and one from Trois-Rivières. A year later, the senior-level league teams from the Estrie and Bas-Saint-Laurent leagues joined bringing the total up to 15. In 2009, the league became the sole senior elite baseball league in Quebec when the Ligue de Baseball Senior Majeur du Québec folded, and its four teams joined the LBEQ.

In 2004, the LBSEQ became the first in Quebec to use wooden baseball bats exclusively. Other competitive levels of play in Quebec have since followed suit (senior, junior and midget).

In its seven years of existence, the LBSEQ has represented Quebec in the Baseball Canada Senior Men's Championship each year and has earned four medals. These were a bronze in 2002, a gold in 2003, a bronze in 2004 and a silver in 2008.

The LBSEQ has also participated in various tournaments outside of Quebec. In 2008, they played in the 4 Nations Cup in Liège against professional teams from Belgium and England. In 2009, the LBSEQ participated in a tournament in Rouen, France hosted by the local team the Huskies, along with teams from Germany, the USA and the French national team. In 2008, the league participated in and won the Vintage Base Ball World Series in Massachusetts. It competed against the Intercounty Baseball League of Ontario in the 2010 New Era All-Star Classic.

In 2013, with the league's growing caliber and reputation, the league's leaders made the decision to rename it the Ligue de baseball majeur du Québec (LBMQ).

== Teams ==
Active teams in the Ligue de Baseball Majeur du Québec
| Team | City | Venue |
|---|---|---|
| Acton Vale Castors | Acton Vale | Léo-Asselin Stadium |
| Coaticook Big Bill | Coaticook | Julien Morin Stadium |
| Brock Baseball Club | Drummondville | Jacques-Desautels Stadium |
| Granby Guerriers | Granby | Napoléon-Fontaine Stadium |
| Laurentides Cardinaux | Saint-Colomban | Gaffney-Kennedy Field |
| Montreal Jets | Montreal | Raymond Daviault Stadium |
| St-Jean Pirates | Saint-Jean-sur-Richelieu | Richard Lafontaine Stadium |
| Shawinigan Cascades | Shawinigan | Shawinigan Optimiste Park |
| Sherbrooke Expos | Sherbrooke | Amedée Roy Stadium |
| Thetford Unicanvas | Thetford Mines | Caisses Desjardins Stadium |
| Victoriaville Cactus | Victoriaville | Victoriaville Park |

== Champions ==
- 2025: Acton Vale Castors
- 2024: Victoriaville Cactus
- 2023: Acton Vale Castors
- 2022: Thetford Mines Blue Sox
- 2021: Shawinigan Cascades
- 2020: Victoriaville Cactus
- 2019: Thetford Mines Blue Sox
- 2018: Thetford Mines Blue Sox
- 2017: Acton Vale Castors
- 2016: Thetford Mines Blue Sox
- 2015: Thetford Mines Blue Sox
- 2014: Thetford Mines Blue Sox
- 2013: Thetford Mines Blue Sox
- 2012: Thetford Mines Blue Sox
- 2011: Acton Vale Castors
- 2010: St-Jérôme TPX
- 2009: Sherbrooke Expos
- 2008: Trois-Rivières Vertdure
- 2007: Victoriaville 4*44
- 2006: Rivière-du-Loup Ciel
- 2005: Rivière-du-Loup Ciel
- 2004: Sherbrooke Indiens
- 2003: Montreal
- 2002: Laval

== See also ==
- Baseball awards#Canada
