= Calgary Outlaws (baseball) =

Canadian minor league baseball team

Logo
Cap insignia

Information
- League: Canadian Baseball League (2003)
- Location: Calgary, Alberta, Canada
- Ballpark: Foothills Stadium
- Founded: 2003
- Folded: 2003
- League championships: One
- Division championships: One
- Former name: Calgary Outlaws (2003)
- Colours: Black, Red, Silver
- General manager: Glenn Dmetrichuk
- Manager: Jody Davis
- Coach: Steve Trout, Craig Burak

The Calgary Outlaws were an independent minor league baseball team in the short-lived Canadian Baseball League (2003). They were based in Calgary, Alberta, and played home games at Foothills Stadium. Former MLB catcher Jody Davis managed the team.

The team existed for only half a season, in 2003. Midway through the only Canadian Baseball League season, the league folded for financial reasons. Because the Outlaws had the best record in the CBL when it ceased operations, they were named the first and only CBL champions. They finished the 2003 season with a record of 24-13.
