= Niagara Stars =

Canadian baseball team

Logo
Cap insignia

Information
- League: Canadian Baseball League
- Location: Welland, Ontario
- Ballpark: Welland Stadium
- Founded: 2003
- Folded: 2003
- League championships: 0
- Division championships: 0
- Former name: Niagara Stars (2003)
- Colours: Blue, Red, Gold
- Manager: Pete LaCock

The Niagara Stars played in the independent Canadian Baseball League that existed for half of the summer season of 2003 before folding. Located in the city of Welland, Ontario the team featured a variety of international ballplayers from Canada, the Dominican Republic, and the United States. The Stars were managed by former major leaguer Pete LaCock who led the team to a 15-15 record before league officials pulled the plug on the season at the half-way point.

== Roster ==
Pitchers

No.	Player	Position	Bat	Throw	Height (feet-inches)	Weight (lbs)	Birthplace
15	Brian Barnett	RHP	R	R	6-1	200	Scottsdale, AZ United States
21	Danny Fitzgerald	RHP	R	R	6-2	205	San Diego, CA United States
18	Joe Gannon	RHP	L	R	6-1	200	Buffalo, NY United States
25	Juan Gonzáles	RHP	R	R	6-3	220	Bani, (Dominican Republic)
34	Travis Hubbel	RHP	R	R	6-0	195	Welland, ON Canada
38	Sean Jones	RHP	R	R	6-8	210	Hamilton, ON Canada
28	Justin Keeling	LHP	L	L	5-11	190	San Diego, CA United States
29	Pete Montrenes	RHP	R	R	6-3	210	Los Angeles, CA United States
35	José Quintero	LHP	L	L	6-2	210	Estada Zulia, Venezuela
19	Kevin Virtue	RHP	R	R	6-1	185	London, ON Canada

Batters

No.	Player	Position	Bat	Throw	Height (feet-inches)	Weight (lbs)	Birthplace
32	Rogelio Arias	C	S	R	6-0	197	Villa Duarte, (Dominican Republic)
30	Denio Beltran	SS	S	R	5-11	160	San Pedro de Macoris, (Dominican Republic)
13	Raul Borjas	LF	R	R	5-11	190	Maracay, Venezuela
40	Rich Butler	RF	R	L	6-1	205	Toronto, ON Canada
4	Matt George	OF	R	R	6-0	195	Hamilton, ON Canada
27	Luis Jiminez	CF	R	R	6-1	180	La Romana, (Dominican Republic)
10	Toby Legacy	2B	R	R	6-0	180	Barrie, ON Canada
37	Ali Modami	1B	L	L	5-11	210	Scottsdale, AZ United States
9	Nelwin Oquendo	3B	R	R	6-1	200	Maracaibo, Venezuela
8	Ben Rosenthal	C	L	R	6-0	200	Henderson, NV United States
36	Jeremy Walker	OF	L	R	6-4	220	Aurora, ON Canada
