= Bayside Yankees =

The Bayside Yankees is a traveling baseball team based out of the New York City area that comprises five teams consisting of players ranging in age from 12 to 18 years old. With a tradition rich of winning championships and producing top baseball talents, Bayside has built the reputation as one of the best amateur baseball organizations in the country and history of travel baseball. Thus, they have adopted for themselves the nickname, "Aaaaaaamerica's Team".

Marc Cuseta, founder and head coach of the Senior Yankees, has led the Bayside program to multiple national championships and has contributed to the development of players who have gone on to compete at the collegiate and professional levels. The coaching staff recruits players from across the United States based on skill and demonstrated commitment to the sport. The team participates in national tournaments, where it competes against other highly ranked programs.Their goals are not only to win, but to further develop the players and allow them to gain as much exposure possible to college coaches, scouts and Major League Baseball. Many college programs and professional organizations, have frequently called upon Cuseta to send his highly talented players to their college and organization. In its history, Bayside Yankee players have earned scholarships to universities such as the University of Miami, Clemson University, Vanderbilt University, St. John's University, Duke University, Wake Forest University, University of North Carolina, University of Arizona, Georgia Tech, University of Notre Dame, Oklahoma State, Florida State, Virginia Tech, University of Pittsburgh, Tulane University, University of Kentucky, and top junior colleges. Dozens of Bayside Yankee players have moved onto professional baseball careers.

After finishing the 2012 summer season and going 1–2 in the Connie Mack World Series, Cuseta has 1,999 wins in amateur baseball. 2,000 should come relatively soon as the BY's start their 2012 fall season.

NABF National Champions

- 1983, 1986, 1992, 1993, 1994, 1995, 1996, 1997, 1998, 2004, 2005, 2006(sophomore division), 2008

CABA Senior World Champions

- 1997, 1998, 1999 & 2003

NABF Regional Champions

- 1982, 1983, 1984, 1986, 1988, 1989, 1992, 1993, 1994, 1995, 1996, 1997, 1998, 1999, 2000, 2002, 2003, 2004, 2005,& 2006

New York Liberty Tournament Champions

- 1989, 1992, 1993, 1994, 1995, 1996, 1997, 1998, 1999, 2000, 2004, 2005, 2006, & 2007

East Cobb (rawlings / Worth) Summer Classic Champions

- 2005

Alabama Bombers Summer Classic Champions

- 2005

Joe Graci Memorial Tournament

- 1995, 1996, 1997, 1998, 1999, 2000, 2001, 2002, 2004, 2005, 2006, & 2007

New York City Federation Champions

- 1984, 1985, 1986, 1988, 1989, 1990, 1991 & 1992

Long Island Baseball Conference Champions

- 1982, 1983, 1984, 1985, 1986, 1988, 1989, 1990, 1991, 1992, 1993, 1994, 1995, 1996, 1997, 1998 & 1999

Big Apple Tournament Champions

- 1998, 1992 & 1996

Suffolk County Invitational Tournament Champions

- 1992

NABF Junior Mid Atlantic Regional Champions

- 1993, 1994, 2006

FABL Suffolk County Champions

- 1994, 1995, 1996, 2001, & 2006

East Cobb Wood Bat Tournament Champions

- 2000

National Junior Baseball League Champions (elite Wood Bat Division Champs)

- 1997, 1998, 1999, 2001, 2002, 2003, 2004, 2005, & 2006

Atlantic Coast Elite Baseball League Champions

- 2001, 2002 & 2004

USA Baseball Junior Olympic Super Series Champions

- 1993

AABC North Atlantic Regional Champions (connie Mack)

- 2003

Senior Premier National Association National Champions

- 2006, 2007

Osceola County Invitational 16U

- 2007

== Teams ==
The organization has different teams according to age: 12u,14u, 16u, 17u, 18u

The teams also participate in 'Fall Ball' that takes place in August through October to help give the players more exposure to college and professional scouts. In the past trips have included Rhode Island, Arizona, North Carolina, Maryland, Virginia, Pennsylvania and South Carolina.

== Notable alumni ==
This is a list of notable alumni, showing drafting team & year when drafted.

- Dereck Adair...............Philadelphia Phillies (1997)
- Garvin Alston..............Colorado Rockies (1994)
- Pedro Alvarez..............Pittsburgh Pirates (2008)
- Corey Baker ...................St. Louis Cardinals (2011)
- Rocco Baldelli.............Tampa Bay Devil Rays (2000)
- Jason Bergmann.............Montreal Expos (Washington Nationals) (2002)
- Jaff Decker................San Diego Padres (2008)
- Nick Derba.................St. Louis Cardinals (2007)
- Eric Duncan................New York Yankees (2003)
- Tim Federowicz.............Boston Red Sox (2008)
- Anthony Giarratano.........Detroit Tigers (2003)
- Ross Gload.................Florida Marlins (1997)
- Tony Graffanino............Atlanta Braves (1990)
- Craig Hansen...............Boston Red Sox (2005)
- Nick Hundley...............San Diego Padres (2005)
- Jim Johnson................Baltimore Orioles (2001)
- Steve Karsay...............Toronto Blue Jays (1990)
- Billy Koch.................Toronto Blue Jays (1996)
- John Lannan................Washington Nationals (2005)
- Jonathan Lester............Boston Red Sox (2002)
- Jim Mecir..................Seattle Mariners (1991)
- Evan Meek..................Minnesota Twins (2002)
- Peter Munro................Boston Red Sox (1994)
- Cody Ross..................Detroit Tigers (1999)
- Corey Smith................Cleveland Indians (2000)
- Will Smith..................Philadelphia Phillies (1990)
- Walt Weiss.................Oakland Athletics (1985)
- Brian Wilson...............San Francisco Giants (2004)
