= 2013 Canada Summer Games =

- 12th Canada Summer Games
- Host city: Sherbrooke, Quebec
- Provinces and Territories: 13
- Events: 270 in 16 Sports
- Opening: August 2
- Closing: August 17
- Opened by: Stephen Harper
- Main venue: Université de Sherbrooke Stadium (OC); Parc Jacques Cartier(CC)

Summer

The 2013 Canada Summer Games was a national multi-sport event that was held in Sherbrooke, Quebec from August 2, 2013, to August 17, 2013. These Games were the first Canada Summer Games to be held in Quebec, and third overall after the inaugural Canada Winter Games in Quebec City in 1967 and the 1983 Canada Winter Games in Saguenay.

== Medal table ==
The following is the medal table for the 2013 Canada Summer Games.

* Host nation ( Quebec)

Rank	Province	Gold	Silver	Bronze	Total
1	Ontario	95	69	49	213
2	Quebec*	53	58	61	172
3	British Columbia	47	36	39	122
4	Alberta	34	42	42	118
5	Nova Scotia	16	18	22	56
6	Saskatchewan	8	18	25	51
7	New Brunswick	5	5	6	16
8	Manitoba	3	11	21	35
9	Prince Edward Island	0	2	0	2
10	Newfoundland and Labrador	0	1	1	2
11	Northwest Territories	0	0	0	0
11	Nunavut	0	0	0	0
11	Yukon	0	0	0	0
Totals (13 entries)		261	260	266	787

=== Sports ===
269 events in 17 different sports were contested. The only change at these Games involved dropping rugby sevens and replacing it with fencing (which was moved over from the Canada Winter Games.

Numbers in parentheses indicate the number of medal events proposed to be contested in each sport/discipline.

- Aquatics
  - Diving (8)
  - Swimming (80)
- Athletics (54)
- Baseball (1)
- Basketball (2)
- Canoeing
  - Canoe sprint (34)
- Cycling
  - Mountain biking (6)
  - Road (6)
- Fencing (12)
- Golf (4)
- Rowing (14)
- Sailing (5)
- Soccer (2)
- Softball (1)
- Tennis (5)
- Triathlon (5)
- Volleyball
  - Volleyball (2)
  - Beach volleyball (2)
- Wrestling
  - Freestyle (26)

== Venues ==
List of venues as follows:

- Atto Beaver Park: Beach volleyball
- Bishop's University: Basketball, Soccer
- Cegep de Sherbrooke - Centre de l'activité physique: Fencing, Wrestling
- Centre récréatif de Rock Forest: Tennis
- Sherbrooke: Cycling
- Lac des Nations: Canoe-Kayak
- Lac Magog: Rowing, Sailing
- Lac Memphrémagog: Open Water Swimming
- Milby Golf Club: Golf
- Mont Bellevue: Mountain Bike
- Palais des Sports: Basketball
- Parc Bureau: Softball
- Parc Desranleau: Softball
- Parc de l'Est: Baseball
- Stade Julien Morin: Baseball
- Parc Sylvie-Daigle: Soccer
- Stade Amédée-Roy: Baseball
- Université de Sherbrooke: Athletics, Diving, Soccer, Swimming, Volleyball

== Participating provinces and territories ==
All 13 provinces and territories competed.

- Alberta
- British Columbia
- Manitoba
- New Brunswick
- Newfoundland and Labrador
- Northwest Territories
- Nova Scotia
- Nunavut
- Ontario
- Prince Edward Island
- Quebec (Hosts)
- Saskatchewan
- Yukon Territory
