= Montreal Royales =

Defunct baseball team in Canada

- Logo

Information
- League: Canadian Baseball League
- Location: Montreal, Quebec, Canada
- Ballpark: None
- Founded: 2003
- Folded: 2003
- League championships: 0
- Division championships: 0
- Former name: Montreal Royales (2003)
- Colours: Royal Blue, Red, Gold
- Manager: Gary Roenicke

The Montreal Royales were one of eight teams in the short-lived Canadian Baseball League (2003 only). The Royales of the CBL, unrelated to the Montreal Royals of 1939–1960, were strictly a road team which never succeeded in obtaining a "home" field in the Montreal area to play, despite several efforts to negotiate one. All nine of their home games were played in neutral cities such as Sherbrooke (Amedée Roy Stadium). The Royales finished their season at the bottom of their division with a 10-22 record.
