= Université de Sherbrooke Stadium =

Multi-purpose stadium in Sherbrooke, Quebec, Canada

Coordinates: 45°22′29″N 71°55′50″W

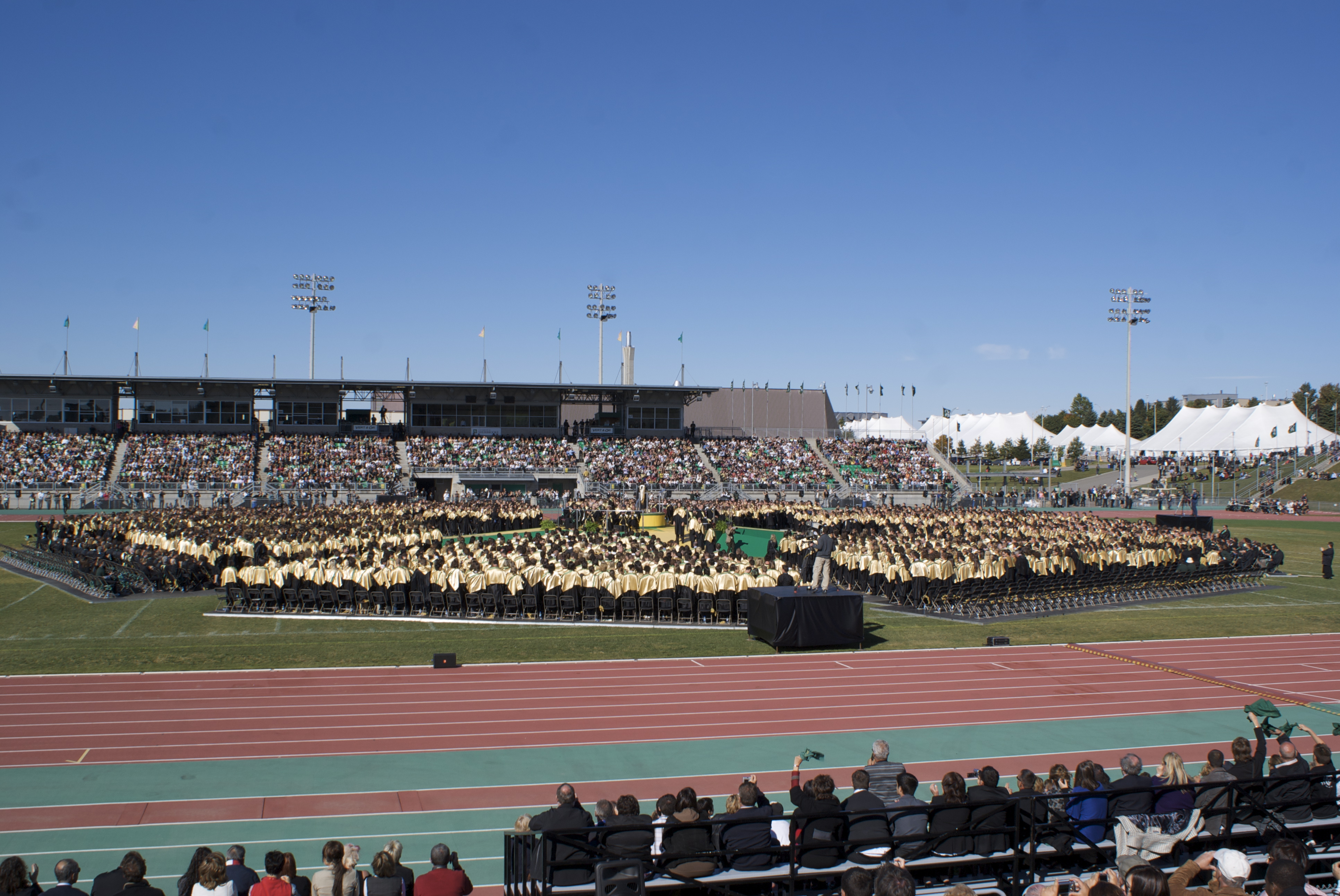
- Interactive map of Université de Sherbrooke Stadium
- Location: Sherbrooke, Quebec
- Owner: Université de Sherbrooke
- Capacity: 3,359

Construction
- Opened: 2003
- Cost: $10 million

Tenant
- Sherbrooke Vert et Or (CIS) (2003-present)

Université de Sherbrooke Stadium (Stade de l'Université de Sherbrooke) is a multi-purpose stadium at the Université de Sherbrooke in Sherbrooke, Quebec, Canada. It is home to the Sherbrooke Vert et Or track and field, soccer, and football teams. It was built in 2003, and has a fixed seating capacity of 3,359. The stadium hosted the 2003 World Youth Championships in Athletics. The stadium remains multi-purpose having the potential to host an array of sport including but not limited to:

- Soccer
- American football
- Field Hockey
- Lacrosse

The field has a notable Track and Field history and a space where people can practice off tournament hours.
