= Howard Ryshpan =

Canadian actor (born 1932)

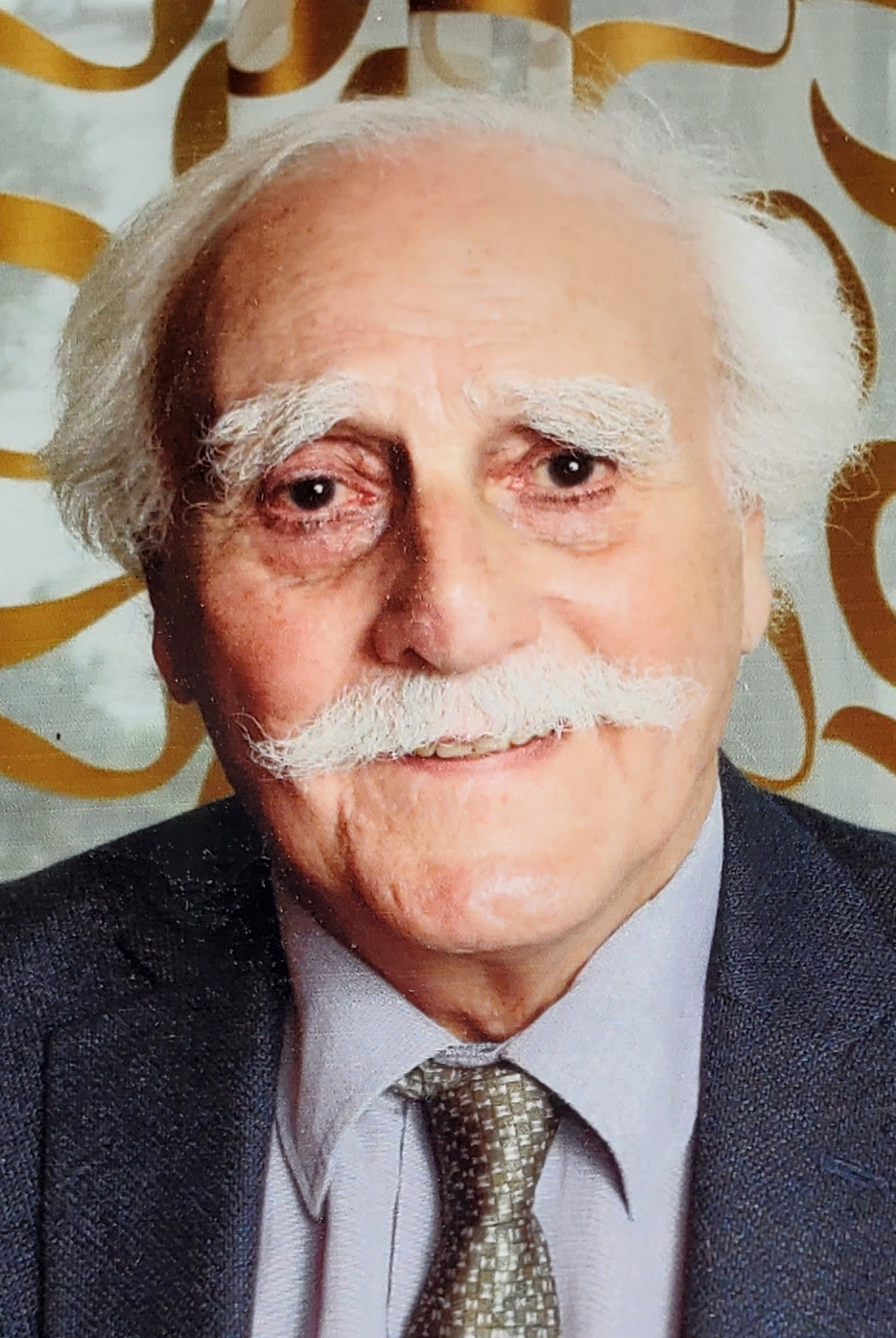
- Ryshpan, Howard, English-speaking Canadian actor from Quebec
- Born: 5 December 1932 (age 93); Bronx, New York City, United States
- Education: Bishop's College (1948-51) and Sir Georges William University (1951-52)
- Occupations: Screen and voice character actor in radio, film, television and theater. Theater teacher and stage director.
- Years active: 1951–2017
- Spouse(s): Virginia Rae Burns and Jocelyne Côté

Howard Ryshpan (born December 5, 1932, in New York City) (son of Reuben Ryshpan (1887–1977) and Cecilia Nathanson) is a Canadian anglophone screen and voice character actor, in radio, film, television and theater. He also taught theater. He has directed numerous plays, notably at festivals. As an artist, Howard Ryshpan is one of the pioneers of Black & White English television in Montreal which started in September 1952.

His father Reuben was born in Poland from Hungarian origin parents, having arrived in Connecticut at the age of 9. His mother Cecilia who was born in Ottawa was a musician and music teacher successively in Ottawa, Toronto and New York. Howard's parents moved from New York City to Montreal in 1934.

Howard Ryshpan studied at Strathcona Christian Academy in Outremont, until grade 9 (until 1947); one year at Montreal Technical School (1947–48), which was run by the Jesuits on Sherbrooke Street; and three years at Bishop's College (1948–51). In June 1951, Howard received his study certificate from Bishop's College School (B.C.S.) at Lennoxville, Québec. After Bishop College, Howard was a student from Sept. 1951 to April 1952 in a baccalaureate of arts at Sir Georges William University (which merged with Loyola University in 1974) in Montreal.

His mother wanted him to become a musician. His father Reuben wanted him to get over the family business in textile in Montreal; the factory that produced ladies and children wears, as well as military clothing during the Second World War (1939–1945), was located on Dowd Street. This stock company ("Advance Scarf Mfg. Co., Limited") in Montreal had been owned since 1935 by his father Reuben and his uncle Meyer; the latter was also a painter, engraver and watercolorist. Howard started working there at the age of 9 during school holidays; he tied the bundles of linen for shipment. But Howard preferred to start a career in performing arts. Theater was a dream for him. In summer 1948 (at 16), Howard was an animator in a Laurentian summer camp. Then he worked briefly at his father's textile factory.

After graduating from Bishop, Ryshpan accepted an offer to enlist in the Canadian Army. He took initial courses in the handling of arms with the Montreal Blackjack regiment. However, he did not have to participate in the Korean War (1950–53).

He married Virginia Rae Burns on November 23, 1956, in Montreal. The couple sailed on the next morning on the RMS Ivernia for a crossing of the Atlantic, from Montreal to the city of Le Havre, France. Following an extended stay in Paris, Ryshpan studied in private school, under one of Europe's most famous dramatic teachers, Étienne Decroux (1898–1991) who formulated the art of mime. Then the couple Ryshpan-Rae extended the summer 1957 travelling on the Continent and in the British Isles.

Howard Ryshpan has been living in semi-retirement since 2009 on a farm in the municipality of Bristol in the Pontiac Regional County Municipality, in Quebec, in Canada.

== Biography ==
=== Professional career in theater ===
Student theater performances

Howard Ryshpan was an actor in Shakespeare's play The Tempes presented in February 1949 by the Player's Club production team at Bishop's College School (BCS), where he was a student.

Howard played the role of Russian ballet teacher in the comic play You can't take it with you at the B.C.S. Players' Club on February 6 and 7, 1950. The screenplay focuses on a Sycamore family from New York who believes in the philosophy of living now rather than trying to make a lot of money, because you can't win with you.

For the 1950–51 school year at BCS, Howard personalized in a room the role of a bishop, with excellent synchronization, good gestures and demonstrating good control.

Theatrical performances in artistic career

On December 1, 1950, Howard Ryshpan was a participant in the Philip King's farce, See How They Run humor contest at Bishop's College School. This contest was organized by the Player's Club under the direction of Lewis Evans and directed by the school principal Ronald Owen.

Howard Ryshpan played as an actor in the professional troop Canadian Players at the Gesù Theater in Montreal, in particular:

- until July 18, 1953, in the play French Without Tears written by Terence Rattigan. This is the story of a bunch of boys who are preparing for diplomacy while learning French, and who are troubled by the appearance of a young (light) woman. In a classic crossover on stage, the actors Victor Knight, Ion Dobbie and Howard Ryshpan fight to conquer the heart of the young woman personified by Jeanine Beaubien;
- in the fall of 1953, in the play Light up the Sky, a comedy by Moss Hart.

Howard was one of the performers in the play A Sleep Of Prisoners by Christopher Fry presented on March 3, 1954, in the Van Horne auditorium by the Everyman Players at the Festival Dramatique de l'Ouest du Québec. The competition judge noted that the production of the Everyman Players was of very high quality and that the four performers (Griffith Brewer, John Hempstead, Howard Ryshpan and Victor Knights) had adequately established the atmosphere for Fry's drama, which takes place in a church transformed into a prison camp.

In January 1956, Howard Ryshpan played at the Y.M.H.A. in the play Ring round the moon by taking on the double role of Hugo, dry heart and spoiled child and his sensitive twin brother Frédéric, flexibly passing to both characters.

Howard Ryshpan played in a troop of 20 English-speaking comedians from March 14 to 24, 1956, in the play The Trial presented at Gesù by Théâtre du Nouveau Monde (created in 1954).

Howard Ryshpan played in various plays at the Montreal International Theater in the La Poudrière building, in Old Port of Montreal, including:

- the main role of David, in the play Write me a murder, written by Frederick Knott, which was played, from July 22, 1963;
- a role of stage manager in the summer of 1963 for the play Romanoff and Juliet, written in 1956 by Peter Ustinov;
- a role in the play The Rattle of a Simple Man in three short acts, written by Charles Dyer, presented in April 1965; and resumed from February 9, 1966. The action of the play takes place at the Rodingham Manor, located about two hours from London.

From 10 to April 19, 1965, Howard directed the bilingual play "Le Grand Grand Château" for children at the Petit Théâtre in Place Ville Marie. It is a tale of Mother Goose.

In the summer of 1965, Howard Ryshpan played with Joan Stuart in the play "The Tiger", written by Murray Schisgal, produced by Montreal Instant Theater for Piggery Playhouse Guild inc at "The Piggery-Summer Theater" in Sainte-Catherine-de-Hatley, inaugurated on August 2, 1965. This play will be performed on Oct. 21, 1965 at the Canadian Institute, at the Canadian Women's Circle. Journalist Claude Daigneault commented on the play: "Howard Ryshpan, in the role of "Tiger" proved to be versatile. A breathtaking diction, an inexorable mimicry, he knows many tricks to enhance the humor of a text."

Ryshpan was responsible for the distribution of the play "Fam and Yam", a short play by Edward Albee presented on January 17, 1966, at L'Instant Theater, directed by Mary To die. It is the meeting of a famous playwright, Fam, and a young playwright, Yam. The latter rather makes a biased interview by delivering his opinions and taunting the owners of theaters.

In May 1966, he conducted two plays for the new Théâtre Baril in Montreal.

The play “Bird in the Box” by Maxime Fleischman started the Regional Dramatic Festival in 1967. This play in three acts (each representing Hope, Illusion and Truth) en-scène by Howard Ryshpan takes place in a hotel suite decor in Manhattan; it features people associated directly or indirectly with Broadway Theatre (53rd Street).

In Nov. 1967, he was the director of the play "The day it rained forever" by Ray Bradbury and played the role of Mr. Fremley. This piece was presented at the Théâtre de la Place (Place Ville-Marie).

Howard was one of 10 performers in a three-piece series presented at the University of Waterloo on Oct. 5, 1968 by the Montreal Instant Theater as part of the Festival The Arts in the Pepsi-Generation, organized by the students of this institution. These three pieces are "Land Before Time" by Charles Cohen, This is "The Rill Speaking" by Lanford Wilson and "Revue Time" by Harold Pinter and N. Simpson.

In 1969, Howard Ryshpan directed the production of The Playmakers by Corner Brook at the Saint John Drama Festival in Newfoundland. He was chosen as the best director of the festival and won an award for directing the best play "Live Like Pigs" written by John Arden. This troupe represented the Maritime provinces at the National Dramatic Festival, from May 19 to May 24, 1969, in Kelowna, in British Columbia.

On May 4, 1969, Howard interprets extracts from works by Franz Kafka, in a special program at the Saidye Bronfman Center in Montreal.

In addition, Ryshpan was one of the performing artists for the opening of Place des Arts in Montreal in September 1964, the Piggery Theater in Sainte-Catherine-de-Hatley in August 1965 and the National Arts Center in Ottawa in May 1969.

=== Teaching theater at Loyola and Dawson College ===
Howard Ryshpan taught theater in Montreal for a year at Loyola College until his 1974 merger with Concordia University. Then he was teacher in the theater department at Dawson College in Montreal from 1982 To 2002. This department presented annually to the public theatrical plays in English, at the Dome Theater, at 3990 Notre-Dame Ouest, Montreal. The theatrical productions in the studio are carried out by 2nd year students; major productions are carried out by students (graduating) in the 3rd year of the program. These plays in English which were directed by Howard Ryshpan and played at Dome Theatre, are in particular:

- February 23 to 26, 1984, We can't pay? Won't pay, from Dario Fo;
- March 5 to 10, 1985, A Murder Has Been Arranged, of Emlyn Williams;
- February 4 to 9, 1987, The Merchant of Venice, of William Shakespeare;
- February 3 to 7, 1988, As you like it by William Shakespeare;
- February 1–5, 1989, The Cherry Orchard by Anton Tchekhov;
- Jan. 30 to February 3, 1991, Shakespeare's Women of Libby Appel and Michael Flachmann;
- from 17 to 27 November 1993, the theatrical play Fen by Caryl Churchill;
- in November 1994, the play The Caucasian Chalk Circle by Bertolt Brecht.

=== Radio career ===
His first radio participation was in Fall 1951 at CFCF of Montreal, as a volunteer for children program for the season and he realized many broadcasts. He used to play stories and cases stories (ex.: dragon, princess, castle stories, etc.) on radio. He played many radios broadcast live.

In 1967, he conducted different interviews in a diamond city in Tanzania for CBC Radio Canada. This series was for CBC as part of Expo 67 thematic. In 1967, he participated as an artist in the first color television broadcast in Montreal from the site of the exhibition.

During the October 1970 Crisis in Quebec, Howard Ryshpan was a radio speaker on CBC Radio-Canada.

=== Career in cinema ===
One of his first roles on the screen is that of doctor in the Canadian production Blood Relatives (French: Les liens du sang) which is a film Franco-Canadian policeman directed by Claude Chabrol, released in 1978. The scenario consists of a young girl who takes refuge one evening in a police station in Montreal covered with blood and tells a confused family story.

In cinema, Howard Ryshpan was notably an actor in the role of Dr. Dan Keloid in the horror film, entitled Rabid (or Rage in French), with the actors Marilyn Chambers, Joe Silver, Patricia Gage and Susan Roman, published in early 1977 Filmed in Montreal in 1977, the film Rage reports on the epidemic of rage triggered by a young woman's motorcycle accident. By patching up the injured victim, a cosmetic surgeon delves into the treatments. The horror of the film translates into scenes of blood and death. Audio comments and an interview with the director of the film David Cronenberg are presented in addition to the film.

The name of Howard Ryshpan appears in the co-casting of the film Virus (1980 film); he was assisted in the casting by his daughter Arden Ryshpan. The screenplay for the movie Virus (1980) is based on the period after which a virus devastated the world's human population. Survivors living in Antarctica ultimately try to find a clinical way to save the remaining humanity.

In 1983, Howard Ryshpan took on the role of Doctor Katz in the film "Happiness Used" directed by Claude Fournier. The scenario takes place in the 1940s, when Canada participated in the Second World War. Coming from a very poor family, Florentine is looking for love. She meets two suitable men: a nice soldier from a good and wealthy family, and an ingenious but self-absorbed engineer. Florentine must choose between following her heart or her reason ...

Howard Ryshpan was a key actor in the film In the Service of Freedom whose screenplay was written by Lionel Chetwynd. The film was produced in 2001.

Ryshman was narrator for the role of Geppetto in the science fiction cartoon Pinocchio 3000, which was released on July 29, 2005, and whose director was Daniel Robichaud, based on the original work of Peter Svatek. The character Geppetto turns out to be a good and humble wood sculptor living in a small house with his Figaro kitten and his Cleo goldfish. According to the blue fairy, Geppetto represents a form of saint and is supposed to have spent a majority of his life ignoring others.

Ryshpan acted as a gallery member in the film The Greatest Game Ever Played (2005) (French: "Un parcours de légende"). The script for this film takes place at the 1913 US Open, where Francis Ouimet, 20, plays golf against his idol, Englishman Harry Vardon, champion of the 1900 US Open.

=== Television (shows and series) ===
The black and white television series began in Montreal on Sept. 06, 1952; right away, Howard was hired to play in the first edition of a series of dramas on CBC Radio-Canada. The series was created by Ruth Kaplan who was producer and director. Howard Ryshpan played the voice of a puppet show in the Sunday Bible Show.

Howard Ryshpan appears on television in 1955 in the first episode of the TV movie Montserrat.

In 1956, he participated in the first episode The Trial of the drama series Folio as Franz (a guardian).

In 1958, Ryshpan participated in the first episode of the television series General Motors Presents in the character of Robert Thibodeau. That same year, he also participated in the first episode of the TV series "A Midsummer Theater".

In 1962 Howard participated in the first episode of the television series Shoestring Theater which existed from 1959 to 1963.

On Dec. 21 1974, Howard Ryshpan had the role of the father and Myriam Breitman of the mother, in the program "Raisins and Almonds". The script consists of the story of a young Jewish girl and her experience in a small Protestant town in the 1920s on the Canadian Prairies.

In dec. 1975, Howard was an actor in the role of Chief Rat in the program Nic and Pic and the imposters; while her daughter Arden Ryshpan was playing the Gray Rat. In the script, Professor Migraine (actor: Peter Macneil) entrusts Nic and Pic with the delicate mission of watching over his latest invention. Two rats disguised as Nic and Pic try to steal the secret machine and photograph the plans.

Ryshpan was a narrator in the role of Nono in the four episodes of the television series Ulysse 31 published in 1981.

Howard Ryshpan is well known for lending his voice to the character of Mendoza in the English version of The Mysterious Cities of Gold (animated television series, 1982), broadcast on Nickelodeon (TV Channel) at the beginning and the middle of the 1980s. It is a Franco-Japanese-Luxembourgish animated television series in 39 episodes of 28 minutes, the last five of which were recorded in 1983. He was also the voice director of the show.

Ryshpan played the role of obstetrician in the first episode of the dramatic television series Evergreen (miniseries) (1985) which appeared on February 24, 1985, in United States. This three-episode series was written by Jerome Kass and Belva Plain.

His last role dates back to 2005, also as a doctor, in the production A year in the death of Jack Richards.

Howard Ryshpan is the voice actor behind Fritz Langley in the television series "Arthur". Fritz Langley is a male rodent character; he is the former caretaker of the Edwood City Community Gardens. Ryshpan participated in four episodes, respectively in 2004 (Buster's Green Thumb/My Fair Tommy), 2009 (Home Sweet Home/Do You Believe in Magic), 2010 (Buster's Garden of Grief/Through the Looking Glasses) and 2017 (The Master Builders).

== Development of dubbing and post-synchronization software ==
As early as 1999, Howard Ryshpan and his wife Jocelyne Côté, a computer specialist, greatly innovated dubbing and post-synchronization methods in cinema and television thanks to the development of the Dub Studio software suite. This computer application running under Microsoft Windows, entirely developed in Quebec, made it possible to synchronize the voice of the dubber of a film or program with the lip movement of the actor he dubbed.

According to Dub Studio's technique, the image being scanned, the system recognizes the changes of shots and identifies them on the tape with visual indication of the time code. Thanks to voice recognition, the system listens to the dialogue and positions the text in the appropriate place on the tape.

This new technique facilitated the adaptation of a film or a program in a foreign language. To develop and market this new software, the Ryshpan-Côté couple launched the joint-stock company Ryshco media inc. DubStudio integrated a voice recognition device developed by the "Centre de recherche en informatique de Montréal" (English: Montreal Computer Research Center) (CRIM), in close collaboration with the designers of DubStudio, for the needs of post-synchronization.

== See also ==
- Arden R. Ryshpan, daughter of Howard
- Bishop's College School
- List of Bishop's College School alumni
- Dome Theatre
