= Piggery Theatre =

Summer community theater in Quebec

- Interactive map of Piggery Theatre
- Address: 215 Chemin Simard, Sainte-Catherine-de-Hatley, Quebec, Canada, J0B 1W0
- Location: Sainte-Catherine-de-Hatley
- Coordinates: 45°16′11″N 72°0′43″W
- Elevation: 251 m (823 ft)
- Owner: Townships Playhouse Guild (which became "The Piggery Theater Inc" in 1981)
- Capacity: 246 seats
- Type: Community theatre

Construction
- Built: 1964-65
- Opened: 2 August 1965
- Architect: Patrick Stoker (for the transformation of the pigsty into a theater)

Website
- piggerytheatre.com

The Piggery Theatre (French: Le Théâtre Piggery) is a summer community theater in Sainte-Catherine-de-Hatley, in the Memphrémagog Regional County Municipality, in Estrie, in Quebec, Canada. By 1990, the Piggery was already the oldest professional English-language theater in Quebec and the only English-language summer theater in the province.

Surrounded by a forest (originally surrounded by fields) and mountainous setting, this entertainment site is also renowned for the organization of business or association meetings, meetings of friends or family, weddings as well. than other social or artistic events. Some events at the Piggery are aimed at raising funds for organizations.

In addition, since the 1980s, the Piggery has organized an art gallery where local artists and artisans offer their crafts and wares all summer long. This art gallery Emily LeBaron (1906-1983) was thus designated in recognition of this artist, craftswoman, antique dealer and volunteer greatly involved, who contributed greatly to the creation of the Piggery, in particular by donations and by volunteering for the organization of activities. In addition, she was chair of the board of directors.

In its report on its 2010-2015 cultural policy, the MRC of Memphrémagog Regional County Municipality indicates that five cultural institutions in the region have made their mark and are continuing their work of transmitting culture, including The Piggery Theater.

The Piggery Theater was rated the third best summer theater in Canada by the newspaper Ottawa Citizen. In 1982, following the cessation of the Lennoxville Festival's activities (1972-1982), the Piggery Theater remained the only major English-speaking cultural enterprise in the region.

== Geography ==
The Piggery Theater site is located at 215 Simard Road, Sainte-Catherine-de-Hatley, either at an altitude of 251 m, and on the south side of Webster Creek. This theater is one kilometer in a direct line from the west shore of lake Massawippi (i.e. in the vicinity of Manoir Hovey), as well as 2.9 km (1.8 mi) east of the east shore of lac Magog. This rural site is 3.3 km (2.1 mi) southwest of the North Hatley bridge and 3.3 km (2.1 mi) northeast of the village center of Sainte-Catherine-de-Hatley. In 1965, this site was located near Noble Ranch.

== Wide variety of activities and customers ==
Although the activities presented to the public are generally held in English, several performances are held in French.

Annually, the theater season usually begins around mid-June and continues until the end of August. In the past, the Theater generally presented two or three large plays in its summer program.

During her 40th founding anniversary in 2005, Nancy Nourse of The Record newspaper wrote: "Over the years, The Piggery also offered a variety of other activities which helped to make it a vibrant center of summer entertainment".

The growing public interest in the Piggery has been derived from the provision of a variety of entertainment options. For example, in 2011 the program featured 16 theatrical performances, in addition, the addition of musical performances included folk, country, bluegrass, jazz, classical, musical and a variety of tribute shows. In addition to theatrical activities, this site occasionally offers varied performances of song, music and magic. It also offers group meal service at events. In addition, the restaurant was renovated in (1997) and designated "The Posh Pig" since 1997.

The theater has enabled many artists in the region to assert their talents and flourish in the performing arts. Several artists and stage staff have experience in other performance centers or were performing arts students, notably at Bishop's University (Lennoxville) or Dawson College (Montreal). Several stage managers who are new to their careers have started their apprenticeship as a stage director at the Piggery.

Throughout history, the Piggery Theater has presented a variety of Canadian, American and British plays, as well as musical, magician and comedian performances. Several plays presented at the Piggery Theater were part of tours of guest theater companies, having performed in theaters in particular: Bishop's University's Centennial Theater (Sherbrooke), Théâtre du Lac Brôme, Centaur Theatre (Montreal), La Poudrière (Montreal), Dome Theatre (Dawson College, Montreal), Saidye Bronfman Center Theater (Montreal), National Arts Center's Atelier (Ottawa) or at various festivals.

In 2002, the Piggery organized a first language arts camp, offering a chance for children aged 8 to 12 to learn English or French through the arts. The following year, the Piggery organized boot camps for would-be funny guys in a special two-day workshop (Aug. 24 and 25) as part of The Piggly Giggly Comedy Fest (Aug. 24–30).

The theater offers "Piggery Theater Summer Drama Camps" of typically four days. Usually, a student show is presented to the public at the end of the camp.

Mary Robinson's country dinners have long been a theater draw.

The "Gala fundraising kicks off" takes place annually in mid-June to begin the theatrical season.

The "after-theater cabaret" was added to the service offering in 1980.

== Buildings and infrastructure ==
The English term "piggery" means "pigsty" because the theater was installed in 1965 in the pigsty/warehouse of Arthur Russell Virgin (1877-1968), built in 1945. Four ventilation turrets are installed on the Piggery gable, the main one with a compass rose topped with a weather vane symbolized by the profile of a pig. These turrets are the result of the installation in 1985 of a heat reflecting roof and ceiling exhaust fans, while maintaining the rustic character of the building.

Since 1980, the administration has implemented a multi-year roof reinforcement program, the construction of a large capacity septic tank and the installation of air conditioning.

During the initial transformation of the building, Guy Bachand, owner of the Premier cinema on King Street West in Sherbrooke, donated 300 free seats in his cinema, which were installed at the Piggery Theater. The latter was in 1965 treasurer of the first board of directors of the Guild. In addition, Mrs. W.W. Leslie donated the stage curtain to the Piggery Theater.

For many years, Arthur Russell Virgin (1877-1968) was the branch manager of the commercial bank (CIBC) in North Hatley. Virgin becomes one of the most prestigious directors of the powerful American company United States Steel.

Janet Blake (death in 1981), owned Clematis Jersey Farm in North Hatley which they moved to in 1931.

In 1972, this large ancestral house was considered to be at least 150 years old; it was then filled with antiques and surrounded by gardens. It was located on top of a hill overlooking Lake Massawippi. After Janet Blake took possession of this home, this home underwent extensive renovations. In addition, the employees and volunteers of the Piggery Theater often came to this house, in particular to eat there and to build theatrical sets.

When Janet Blake died in 1981, specific bequests from her testamentary heritage were distributed in particular to the foundation of the Sherbrooke Hospital, the "Townships Playhouse Guild" (which in 1981 became "The Piggery Theater Inc"), the North Hatley Library, and St. Barnabas Anglican Church.

In 1980, the auditorium (2nd floor) of the Piggery Theater had a capacity of 283 seats and accommodated an audience of 9,400 admissions; 10,000 in 1981 and 11,000 in 1982. Its current capacity is 246 places. The building also has a large stage, restaurant and bar on the lower level.

In the 1980s, the Piggery set up a restaurant serving country dinners before theatrical performances; in addition, an outdoor patio has been set up in front of the restaurant. A few years later, the terrace was added to the front of the building. In addition, a building was moved to the theater site, to be transformed to serve as a set design workshop and warehouse.

== History of this theater ==
Prior to the opening of the Piggery Theater, English-speaking theatergoers from the Eastern Townships could attend the community theater activities organized by the North Hatley Playhouse Guild which existed between 1956 and 1962. This organization offered amateur productions in the building of the former curling club which was located at the North Hatley Playhouse, in the village of North Hatley, on the shores of lake Massawippi. This curling club was operated in association with the Brae Manor Inn (later become the Auberge Hatley), which burned down on March 27, 2006)

The roof of this former curling club collapsed in the winter of 1962 under the weight of heavy snowfall; this theater then had to cease its activities. Nevertheless, the North Hatley Playhouse had succeeded in instilling in the collective mind a marked interest in theatrical performances in the Eastern Townships. A group of citizens have organized themselves to restore the tradition of summer theater in the region. This enthusiasm for the survival of the theatrical mission in the region was spurred by, among others, Walter Massey and Norman Springford of Montreal Theater Company, as well as other supporters: Emily LeBaron, Arthur Russell Virgin, Margaret Coste, Dunbar Bishop, Helen Austin, Bruce McKeay...

The Townships Playhouse Guild was formed in 1964 to ensure the sustainability of the performing arts in the Eastern Townships. An intense publicity and fundraising campaign was immediately organized with a view to building or fitting out a new summer theater.

The project was made possible thanks to the donation of a building on Chemin Simard in Sainte-Catherine-de-Hatley granted by Arthur Russell Virgin to the Guilde, comprising a subdivision of 11,831 m2 and a Concrete block building used initially as a pigsty, then transformed into a warehouse.

In addition, Virgin donated $5,000 in cash. Following this generous donation, a fundraising of $60,000 allowed the launch of the theater project. In addition, in 1982, the estate of Janet Blake (deceased in 1981 and widow of Arthur Russell Virgin) of New York (N.Y.) granted a particular important bequest to the Guild in order to ensure the sustainability of the Piggery theater.

In 1964, thanks to these donations, under the chairmanship of Mrs. J. A. Scott, then Dunbar Bishop, the Townships Playhouse Guild initiated the project to build a community theater. The plans for the conversion of the pigsty / warehouse were devised on a voluntary basis by the Montreal architect, Patrick Stoker who gave his time and expertise to design the plans for the theater and supervise the work. The transformation of the building into a theater was carried out in 1964 and 1965 thanks to the efforts of volunteers on duty and professionals. The structure of the building was then reinforced by wooden beams following the angle of the lower slope of the roof and serving as a buttress, fixed on foundations outside the building.

Inside, the wood was rough and unfinished; which gave the rustic character of a pigsty transformed into a theater.

The Piggery Theater was inaugurated on August 2, 1965, by an "open house party at the playhouse". The initial goal was to make it a bilingual theater with activities in English in the summer, as well as in French in the spring and fall.

== Fundraising campaigns ==
Over the years, the Townships Playhouse Guild (rebranding in 1981) has organized a variety of fundraising activities: concerts, auctions, regional tours, fashion shows and craft shows.

Grants from the Federal Secretary of State began in 1973. In 1981–1982, The Townships Playhouse Guild received a first grant from the Government of Quebec in the amount of $2,985 through the Quebec Ministry of Cultural Affairs. A generous donation of funds specifically intended for the dining room expansion project was made to the theater in 1980 to increase capacity to 150 guests; however, this project could not be realized.

In 1990, as part of the 25th anniversary of its existence, a monster auction of 450 various items (antiques, works of art, items created especially for the occasion, high fashion clothing, recreation equipment, baskets for gourmets) organized at the John H. Price Sports Center at Bishop's University raised $200,000.

In 2003, the theater was saved from bankruptcy thanks to financial support from the public; a new administration took place and the offer of performances to the public was revised. On July 17, 2005, a "House & Garden tour fundraiser" was organized to help finance the theater. This tour made it possible to visit several beautiful houses and gardens of North Hatley. This tour was repeated in particular on July 22, 2010.

In 2005, works by local artists were exhibited at the Emily LeBaron Art Gallery during the summer. The name of this Piggery art gallery pays homage to Miss Emily LeBaron of North Hatley who dedicated her life to the development of arts and culture in the Eastern Townships. She has organized a lot of crafts and arts exhibitions. She had a key role in the creation of the La Piggery theater.

In addition, an annual arts and crafts exhibition showcases items from some of the region's best artisans. This exhibit turns out to be an annual fundraising event to ensure the survival of The Piggery.

On Oct. 2, 2010, the theater organized an Oktoberfest food and music. In addition, the theater is financed annually through donations of used items (antiques, kitchenware, etc.) which are sold at the "Piggery Barn Sale Fundraiser" during a day organized annually.

In addition, depending on the period, theatrical activities were included in certain stay packages at Manoir Hovey in North Hatley and at the Riplecove Inn in Ayer's Cliff.

In 2011, several innovations made the Piggery attractive, including sharing the benefits of fundraising with participating community organizations. In addition, the intensification of contacts with groups of seniors in the Montreal region increased the groups coming by bus from seven groups in 2010 to 12 in 2011. Finally, the recording in 2011 of two CBC Vinyl shows. Café with Smart McLean raised the profile of La Piggery.

In June 2014, watercolor artist Maureen Bean held a three-week exhibition at the Piggery Theater with a discount from a portion of the theater sales. The Piggery Market ran from June 22, 2014, until September, allowing local artisans, vendors and producers to offer their products.

== Organization administering the theater ==
"Townships Playhouse Guild" was incorporated on April 28, 1965, under the Companies Act of Quebec as a non-profit organization for the operation of this theater. In 1981, the corporate name was officially changed to "Le Theater Piggery Inc.-The Piggery Theater Inc". According to the Quebec Business Register, the main economic activity of the theater is to act as an agency for shows and artists. The Annual General Meetings of The Piggery Theater Inc are usually held in the winter at the North Hatley Community Center.

The Piggery Theater is affiliated with the "Townhippers’ Association"; this regional organization holds its annual general meetings and awards ceremony at the Piggery Theater. This annual event usually features the performance of artists from the region. Several volunteers are involved with the Piggery Theater.

== See also ==
- Janet Blake
- Emily LeBaron
- Arthur Russell Virgin
- Sainte-Catherine-de-Hatley
