= Ryshpan =

Ryshpan is a surname. Notable people with the surname include:

- Arden R. Ryshpan, Canadian casting director and actress
- Howard Ryshpan (born 1932), English-speaking Canadian actor in radio, film, television, and theater
- Meyer Ryshpan (1898 – 1985), Canadian painter and etcher
