= Janet Blake =

American and Canadian philanthropist (death 1981)

- Died: 1981
- Occupations: Agricultural producer and philanthropist
- Known for: Creation of the Piggery Theatre

Janet Blake (died 1981, also Mrs Arthur R. Virgin, husband of Arthur Russell Virgin) was an agricultural producer specialized in Jersey cattle, a champion in agriculture fairs, a social event organizer, and philanthropist of North Hatley, in Memphrémagog Regional County Municipality, in Estrie, in Quebec, Canada.

Janet Blake had a particular interest in the arts, antiques, Jersey cattle breeding and Jersey exhibitions. The Virgin-Blake couple have made significant financial and moral contributions to several charities in the North Hatley region, particularly in the arts. In addition, financially and morally, they had supported artists in all fields. Janet Blake was a well-engaged participant in regional and provincial farm fairs. She was well regarded by the public and involved in the community of North Hatley.

== Philanthropic couple ==
In 1964, her husband Arthur Russell Virgin made a significant contribution to the Piggery Theatre (Français: Le Théâtre Piggery) by making a donation to the Townships Playhouse Guild of an 11,831 metres (38,815.62 ft) plot of land located at 215 Simard Road in Sainte-Catherine-de-Hatley. This plot included a block building used initially as a pigsty; the latter was built in 1945, then turned into a warehouse.

In September 1979, the community of North Hatley paid warm tribute to Mrs. Janet Blake-Virgin (widow of Arthur Russell Virgin) and Miss Emily LeBaron (1906–1983) at a community meal to recognize their dedication and support to many organizations in the region. These two ladies had a great friendship between them; they often mingled socially and often participated in common causes, notably the North Hatley Community Club and the Piggery Theatre.

Following the death of Janet Blake in summer 1981, the couple's residual fortune was distributed in the form of special bequests mainly to the Sherbrooke Hospital Foundation (nearly $1 million), to the Townships Playhouse Guild (which in 1981 became "The Piggery Theater Inc") (nearly half a million), the North Hatley Library, and St. Barnabas Anglican Church, a quarter of a million each.

== Youth ==
Born at the turn of the 20th century and coming from New York, Blake visited North Hatley in her teens, at the start of the First World War (1914–1918). His parents, wealthy New Yorker bourgeois, owned a luxurious summer residence there. She inherited this sumptuous summer residence. After marrying Arthur Russell Virgin in 1928, Blake moved to North Hatley, where she spent most of her adult life there.

== Large historic house ==
On April 15, 1931, the Virgin-Blake couple moved into the large ancestral house of Clematis Farm in North Hatley. After Blake took possession of this farm, the ancestral home underwent extensive renovations. This large house turned out to be three adjoining houses.

This ancestral home was erected at the beginning of the 19th century by Chauncey LeBaron (born in 1802 and son of Jephtah Wadleigh) and his wife Cordelia Hitchcock following their marriage. Their vast land was adjacent to that of his parents LeBaron, but higher up the hill. It was located on top of a hill overlooking Lake Massawippi. Seven sons were born in this Le Baron-Hitchcock mansion. Wilfrid E. Le Baron (son of Chauncey and Cordelia, deceased in 1928) was the only of the seven children to reside in the old house. He was very successful as an agricultural producer. Nevertheless, the attraction of the west shore of Lake Massawippi generated an influx of vacationers and residents; thus, he sold lots of the lower part of his farm on which the buyers built attractive residences and villas.

This ancestral home has welcomed many guests and social events: weddings, parties, birthdays, meetings, etc. At least one maid took care of the house and garden services. In addition, several group picnics, "garden parties" and animal exhibitions were organized outdoors on this enchanting site, allowing visitors to admire the magnificent gardens. Visitors could complete their visit or stay by visiting the lower floor of the house which contained a lot of antiques. This house was a must stop on sightseeing tours of the North Hatley area.

For example, the North Hatley Community Club hosted a 300-participant garden party on Sept. 5, 1952 at Clementis Farm. Visitors were able to admire the lush gardens and visit the antiques in the house.

The Virgin-Blake couple's fifth wedding anniversary (wooden wedding) was celebrated on January 25, 1933, at the residence of Mr. and Mrs. A. H. Ham in North Hatley. Their tenth anniversary was celebrated at this house on the Clematis farm on January 31, 1938, with 25 guests.

In 1972, this large ancestral house was considered to be at least 150 years old; it was then filled with antiques and surrounded by gardens. An article from 1983 indicates that this ancestral home had been left abandoned for several years; either after Janet's death in 1981.

== Arthur Russell Virgin's career ==
In November 1911, the Sherbrooke Daily Record reported that: "Mr. Arthur R. Virgin, of Concord, New York, who was secretary to the general manager of the Eastern Townships Bank for some time, has returned to town and will again be on the staff of the institution." This institution merged on March 1, 1912, with the Canadian Bank of Commerce which subsequently became Canadian Imperial Bank of Commerce (CIBC).

For many years, Arthur R Virgin was manager of the branch of the Commercial Bank (CIBC) of North Hatley, notably in 1917. The village of North Hatley is well known as a resort. Since the very end of the 19th century, tourism has been the main industry in the village, especially in summer thanks to lake Massawippi. Many vacationers are wealthy and many of them are from US. Thus, Arthur R Virgin then cultivated great social and business relationships with the affluent clientele of this financial institution.

Arthur R Virgin becomes one of the most prestigious directors of the powerful American company United States Steel. Given his success in finance, he became a multimillionaire.

Arthur Russell Virgin died in 1968 at 91 years old. His funeral was held at St. Barnabas Church, North Hatley, on July 22, 1968.

== Clematis farm in North Hatley ==
Blake took possession of Clematis farm in 1931. She ran the farm herself with an average herd of 25 dairy cows, sometimes up to 30. This model farm was accredited for its purebred breeding program of the race Jerseys. Blake's Jersey cattle purchases were rigorous in order to build a high quality dairy herd for both dairy cows and breeding cows. Over the years, her accomplishments with this dairy herd have been well documented and recognized by cattle producers across North America and by the Jersey Breeders Association.

The name of Clematis refers to the clematis. This dark purple flower has been the main theme of the magnificent flower gardens around this ancestral home. The newspaper Sherbrooke Daily Record of December 4, 1946 writes that the Clematis farm, owned by Mr. and Mrs. Arthur Virgin, contained acres of daffodils and a wide variety of cultivated plants.

The different managers of the model farm were: Angus McKinven (1946–1951), Alex McKinven (1923–2006) (1952–1969) from Scotland. John McCaig had been advising Blake on the farm since November 1954 and organized the participation of animals in exhibitions, notably in 1963 and 1965. The Clematis farm had published classified ads in the Sherbrooke Daily Record asking for farmers in 1934, 1941, 1947, 1956, 1963, 1965, 1966 and 1968, offering them a good salary and accommodation in a comfortable house. These farmers were responsible for general farm work, including milking cows, seeds, harvests, plowing, gardens, landscaping this model farm, maintaining fences, maintaining buildings, purchasing, equipment and infrastructure. In winter, it was necessary to add livestock feed and barking. In addition, they took care of properly training the animals in order to parade annually in agricultural exhibitions, notably at the Ayer's Cliff Fair and the Sherbrooke agricultural exhibition.

On October 8, 1935, the Clematis farm published a first ad offering for sale a young Jersey beef (pure bred) six months old. The Clematis farm published other classifieds for the sale of Jerseys breed animals (especially young oxen) until 1959. In an advertisement dated September 26, 1962, which appeared in the Sherbrooke Daily Record, the Clematis farm offered for sale 40 Purebred Animals Jerseys.

This dairy farm was renowned for having equipped itself with modern tillage equipment and tools for the time: tractors, hay balers, bale lifts...

== Champion in agricultural competitions ==
In the mid-twentieth century (at least between 1946 and 1969, i.e. for 23 years), Janet Blake (identified as Mrs Arthur Virgin) won numerous competitions with her Jersey animals in regional and provincial agricultural exhibitions, notably at the exhibition farm of Ayer's Cliff (Ayer's Cliff Fair):

- in 1948 with 20 prizes including 13 Jerseys, 5 Aberdeen Angus and 1 for the best parade of the animals exhibited;
- in 1952, with 19 prizes including the “Best Dairy Cattle on Parade”;
- in 1953, with 26 awards;
- in 1969, with several other awards.

In addition, several prizes were awarded to Janet Blake for the participation of her bovine animals in the Sherbrooke agricultural exhibition (e.g.: in 1949, 1950, 1951, 1952, 1955, 1961, 1967, except 1954). In 1949, Mrs. A.-R. Virgin of North Hatley won the Senior Reserve Championship, as well as the Junior Reserve Championship, at the Sherbrooke Agricultural Show.

With a few farm workers, she also occasionally participated in other agricultural shows including Saint-Hyacinthe, Ottawa Summer Show, Charlottetown (P.É.I.) and Malone (NY, USA). The animals were then transported by truck to the exhibition grounds.

In 1950, a Jersey dairy cow from Clematis farm won a final year dairy competition. In 1952, an article in the Sherbrooke Daily Record read: "Wells Martin of Knowlton and RA Timmins, of Knowlton, set numerous records while from Mrs. Arthur R. Virgin's herd, of North Hatley, came a record for Grand Champion Sunnycrest Royal Countess – 155,080 with a 6-year record of 8,102 lbs. of milk and 468 lbs. of fat in 280 days. This cow was Grand Champion in Sherbrooke in 1951". This cow was also grand champion at Sherbrooke in 1951.

In May 1952, Clematis Sportlight Golden, a two year old junior cow owned by Mrs. Arthur R. Virgin completed a production record 7,555 lbs. of milk, 454 lbs. of fat in 365 days. Another record with 542 lbs. of fat was supplemented by Clematis Magic Bell in Mrs. Virgin's herd. In 1957 Janet Blake won “The Embleton Trophy” for the best hen with an udder.

In 1957, the Jersey herd from the Clematis farm had obtained the "Constructive Breeder award", the highest classification rating so far honored in Canada by the Canadian Jersey Cattle Club. In 1960, the Clematis farm won the "Constructive Breeder award" for the second time. In summary, to qualify, the herd must in particular be mainly raised by the owner, the cows must have a high average production, and the bulls must have been raised or developed on the farm.

In September 1965, Janet Blake's herd won the Conklin Prize for Best Herd Parade at the Sherbrooke Agricultural Show. A photo then appeared on Sept. 2, 1965 in the Sherbrooke Daily Record with John McCaig, adviser to Janet Blake. The bovine animals of the Clematis farm herd were trained with discipline in order to parade well in the agricultural exhibitions.

Janet Blake was a member of the Canadian Jersey Cattle Club which held its annual picnic at Clematis Farm in North Hatley in 1953. In 1964, she was awarded a Jersey Breeder Certificate from the Quebec Jersey Cattle Club.

Janet Blake's last participation in an agricultural show would be the Ayer's Cliff Fair in 1969; there she won other prizes with animals from her purebred herd. In August 1969, she was appointed as director for 1969 among the "Patrons 1969" and honorary member of the Ayer's Cliff Fair.

== See also ==
- North Hathley
- Piggery Theatre
- Emily LeBaron
- Ayer's Cliff Fair
