= Marinier Archipelago =

Archipelago in Estrie, Quebec, Canada

Native name: Archipel Marinier
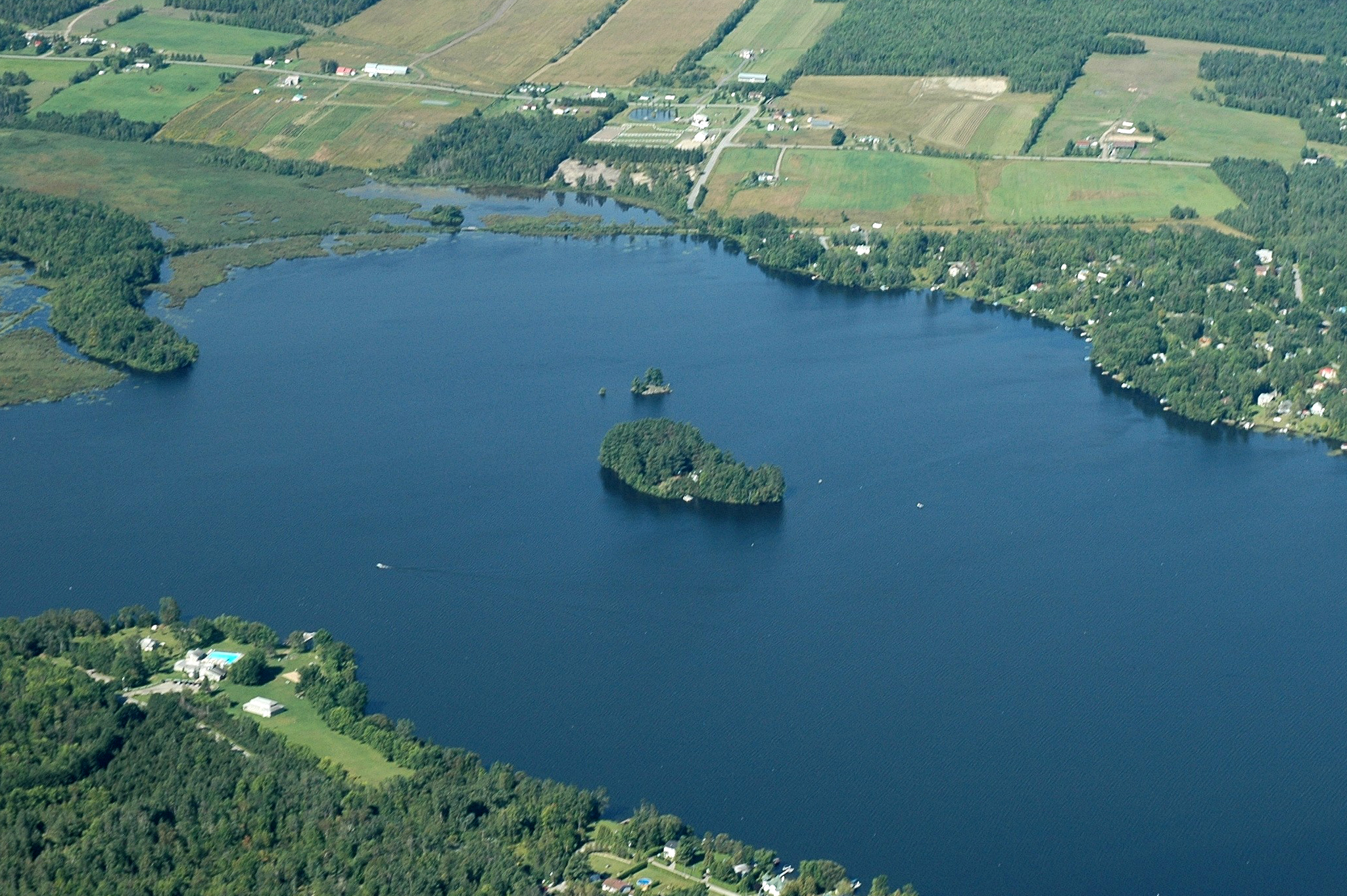
- Aerial view of the Marinier Archipelago in the southern end of Lake Magog

- Location within Quebec

Geography
- Location: Lake Magog
- Coordinates: 45°16′20″N 72°03′11″W
- Archipelago: Marinier
- Total islands: 3
- Area: 0.0115 km^{2} (0.0044 sq mi)

Administration
- Canada
- Province: Quebec
- Regional county municipality: Memphremagog
- Municipality: Sainte-Catherine-de-Hatley

The Marinier Archipelago groups the Odanak Islands, three islands located in the southern end of Lake Magog in the Estrie region of Quebec, Canada. It is part of Sainte-Catherine-de-Hatley.

== History ==
The larger island of the archipelago was originally 6 acres (2.4 hectares), covered with grass, and used as pasture for a few cows brought to the island on a raft at spring time by the owner Ambroise Gaudreau. In fall, the farmer swan them back to the bank. When the Rock Forest hydroelectric dams was built in 1911, the water level of Lake Magog rose by about 3 feet (0.91 metres), which flooded many fields while increasing the size of the lake. The island then reduced size from about 6 acres (2.4 hectares) to 6 acres (2.4 hectares). In 1923, the island became the property of two priests, Charles-Edmond Chartier and Joseph Têtu, who are joined a few weeks later by Canon Émile Chartier, then First Vice-Rector and General Chaplain of the Université de Montréal. Chartier then bought back the part of Father Têtu in 1925, then that of Father Chartier in 1934. In 1938, Canon Chartier built a wooden house with a tower on top of the highest rocky summit of the island, with three footbridges and a two-storey boathouse. He named this house Odanak (which means "at home" in the Abenaki language), and had many trees planted all over the island, especially numerous white pines. In 1956, the island (then named Island Chartier) was acquired by the Orphanage Saint-Joseph of Waterville, in 1967, by the brothers of Holy Cross of Montreal, and then in 1974, by Jacques Darche of Sainte-Catherine-de-Hatley who donated it to the religious community Marie-Jeunesse in 1997. During the winter of 2003, the house on the island was heavily plundered and vandalised.

The smaller island of the archipelago and the islet next to it were originally formed a single island, with a small house perched on top of the rocky hill. When Lake Magog was flooded in 1911, the island was split in two. Only the concrete base of the house's chimney remains today on the small island. In 1959, the island was acquired from Rose-Anna Bernier-Lagasse by the accountant Lionel Jacques, in 1962, by the salesman Léonard Chartier (without kinship with the priest nor the canon Chartier), in 1968, by the radio writer André Boulanger, in 1971, by the engineer Jacques Lemieux, and then in 1976, by the merchant Jacques Darche.

In 2005 and 2006, the islands of the archipelago were acquired from different owners by Bruno-Marie Béchard Marinier, then Rector of the Université de Sherbrooke. The new owner upgraded the housing on the larger island, while maintaining its natural setup. The smaller island is accessible to the public, and is a popular stop while kayaking on Lake Magog.
