= Sailing at the 2013 Canada Summer Games =

Sailing at the 2013 Canada Summer Games was in Sherbrooke, Quebec on Lake Magog. It was held from the 3 to 8 August. There were 5 events of sailing.

== Medal table ==
The following is the medal table for sailing at the 2013 Canada Summer Games.

* Host nation ( Quebec)

Rank	Nation	Gold	Silver	Bronze	Total
1	Ontario	2	0	2	4
2	British Columbia	1	2	1	4
3	Quebec*	1	1	0	2
4	New Brunswick	1	0	0	1
5	Nova Scotia	0	1	1	2
6	Saskatchewan	0	1	0	1
7	Alberta	0	0	1	1
Totals (7 entries)		5	5	5	15

== Results ==
Event	Gold	Silver	Bronze
Single-handed - Laser Male	Fraser Wells; New Brunswick	Max Gallant; British Columbia	Nicolas Hamel; Alberta
Double handed - 29er Male	Ontario; Jmatt Boland; Benjamin Strickland	British Columbia; Lloyd Lyall; Ryan Wood	Nova Scotia; Devan Dube; Greg Simms
Double handed - 29er Female	Ontario; Linor Berezin; Katherine McEwen	Quebec; Virginie Lavallée-Corbeil; Florence Pépin-Delhaes	British Columbia; Maddy Innes; Sophie Papp
Single-handed - Laser Radial Female	Natalia Montemayor; British Columbia	Corinne Peters; Nova Scotia	Bronwyn Richardson; Ontario
2.4m Para Mix	Christine Lavallée; Quebec	Joe Gerlinsky; Saskatchewan	Aaron Wong-Sing; Ontario
