= Pinocchio 3000 =

- Canadian French-language promotional poster
- Directed by: Daniel Robichaud
- Written by: Claude Scasso; Peter Svatek
- Produced by: Louis Duquet
- Starring: Malcolm McDowell; Whoopi Goldberg; Howie Mandel; Helena Evangeliou; Gabrielle Elfassy; Howard Ryshpan; Sonja Ball
- Edited by: Claudette Duff
- Music by: James Gelfand
- Production companies: CinéGroupe; AnimaKids Productions; Filmax Animation; Castelao Productions, S.A; Bren Entertainment, S.A; Canal+ France 2 Cinéma
- Distributed by: Filmax (Spain); Pan-Européenne Distribution; Wild Bunch Distribution (France); Entertainment One; Christal Films (Canada)
- Release dates: July 9, 2004 (Spain); February 9, 2005 (France); July 29, 2005 (Canada)
- Running time: 84 minutes
- Countries: Spain; France; Canada
- Language: English
- Budget: $15 million
- Box office: $1.46 million

Pinocchio 3000 (or P3K – Pinocchio 3000) is a 2004 animated science fantasy film directed by Daniel Robichaud and distributed by Christal Films. A Spanish-French-Canadian co-production, the film is a futuristic science fiction interpretation of the classic 1883 novel The Adventures of Pinocchio by Carlo Collodi, with Pinocchio (voiced by Sonja Ball) being a robot brought to life by tapping into a city's power surge, rather than a puppet animated by magic.

The film centers on the basic story of Pinocchio attempting to fit into living with humans in the town of Scamboville, a futuristic city constantly under development under the reign of its namesake, Mayor Scamboli.

== Plot ==
Geppetto, an old inventor, creates Pinocchio, a robot, as his son. Meanwhile, evil mayor Scamboli is building the technological city "Scamboville" to get rid of nature. He also hates all children, except for his beloved daughter, Marlene. When Marlene expresses concerns to Scamboli about there being no space for children to have fun, he sets out to make a kids-only theme park called "Scamboland".

That night, Geppetto and Spencer the Penguin prepare to make Pinocchio come to life. Unfortunately, Scamboli has seized control of the city mains to light up his theme park for the Grand Opening, so Geppetto has no choice but to steal his electricity. Suddenly, Scamboland has a power outage and the children leave. After Pinocchio comes to life, much to his family's delight, Cyberina the fairy appears. She decides to grant Geppetto's wish to turn Pinocchio into a real boy if he learns about right and wrong.

The next morning, Pinocchio walks his way to school with Spencer and meets Zach, Cynthia and Marlene. Marlene challenges Pinocchio to an Imagination game, hosted by Cyberina. Marlene wins, but Pinocchio, believing that he played better, snatches the medal from her. While running away, he comes across Scamboli's robotic henchmen, Cabby and Rodo, who take him to see Scamboli. In the ensuing conversation, Pinocchio says, "Life would be great if kids were more like us", sparking an idea from Scamboli.

In the true opening of Scamboland, he makes Pinocchio into an attraction. When Geppetto gets word of this, he tries to convince him to come home. While Pinocchio performs at a concert, Scamboli kidnaps Geppetto. Afterward, all the children board a roller coaster ride called "A Whale of a Change", which transforms all of them into "Scambobots". Meanwhile, Pinocchio gives Marlene her medal back and befriends her, and they spend the night together at Marlene's private garden.

As they awaken the next morning, Marlene is crestfallen to find that Scambobots have destroyed her garden. Hearing Pinocchio laughing at her dismay, she gives the medal to him and revokes her vow of friendship. Pinocchio, realizing that he had accidentally helped Scamboli, leaves to find his father. He returns home and only finds Spencer. The two quickly realize that Scamboli turned Geppetto into a robot to kill Pinocchio. After stealing a remote that controls Geppetto and the other Scambobots, Pinocchio and Spencer hide out in the "Tunnel of Danger" ride, where Scamboli manages to trap them. Marlene arrives and helps Pinocchio avoid the tunnel's many dangers. However, Scamboli incapacitates Marlene to kill Pinocchio with a laser gun. Pinocchio uses the medal to shield himself from the laser, causing the beam to reflect back at Scamboli and destroy his weapon. Meanwhile, Cabby accidentally gives Geppetto the remote that controls all Scambobots. Geppetto then commands the robots to get Scamboli.

Scamboli attempts to escape in Cabby's shuttle, but is caught by a Scambocop. It tosses Scamboli inside a shuttle and flies down to the Whale ride. Pinocchio, Geppetto, Marlene, and Spencer try to turn the robots back into children, but Scamboli presses a button to stop the machines. Pinocchio goes inside the whale and tries to fix it. Pinocchio finds the out-of-reach button, but Scamboli starts to attack him. Pinocchio begins to tell lies about how great Scamboli is. This causes Pinocchio's nose to reach long enough to hit the button, causing the carts to start moving again and Scamboli gets caught in the ride. Pinocchio then realizes that everything was his fault and breaks down. Cyberina appears and Pinocchio tells her that he has learned about right and wrong and turns Pinocchio into a real boy and Geppetto back into a human. Suddenly, Scamboli, turned into a robot, appears. In the end, Cyberina borrows Cynthia's "Funbrella" to make sunshine and bring back all the plants Scamboli has destroyed.

== Cast ==
- Sonja Ball as Pinocchio, an artificial intelligence designed by Geppetto who gains an appreciation for life and humans through his father and in befriending Marlene, and possesses a desire to be accepted by children, even if it means cooperating with the evil Scamboli.
- Howard Ryshpan as Geppetto, a robot scientist who constructs Pinocchio and serves as his father.
- Howie Mandel as Spencer, a robotic talking penguin who accompanies Pinocchio on his adventure and assists him with moral decisions. He is the film's equivalent to the original story's Talking Cricket.
- Malcolm McDowell as Mayor Scamboli, the ambitious creator of Scamboville and the primary antagonist of the film. He is based on the character Mangiafuoco and The Coachman from the original story.
- Helena Evangeliou as Marlène, Scamboli's slightly technophobic daughter and the love interest of Pinocchio.
- Whoopi Goldberg as Cyberina, the robotic fairy of the city. She is based on the Fairy from the original story.
- Matt Holland as Cab, a tall and lanky yellow robot that serves Scamboli and his daughter alongside Rodo.
- Jack Daniel Wells as Rodo, a short red robot resembling a porcupine that serves Scamboli and his daughter alongside Cab. Cab and Rodo are based on the Fox and the Cat from the original story.
- Bobby Edner as Zack.
- Gabrielle Elfassy as Cynthia.
- Ellen David as Geppetto's house artificial intelligence.
- Terrence Scammell as Scambocop, a robot policeman who patrols the skyways in a flying police car in Scamboville.

== Music ==
The musical score, by James Gelfand, is quite varied, ranging from pop to soft kid's music. It has been designed with a modern appeal to kids, but pleasant enough for adults. In one instance, Pinocchio sings onstage.

The film's theme song is What's the Difference? expressing Pinocchio's feelings regarding his life as a robot.

== Production ==
The film was directed by Daniel Robichaud with a budget of $15 million.

The film began production in 1998 when Medialab approached CinéGroupe to co-develop a variety of projects, with Pinocchio 3000 being one of them. Medialab executives got Daniel Robichaud to direct the film after seeing his short film Tightrope at Monte Carlos Imagina Festival.

Before the production on the film began, the partners retreated to Spain for a weeklong brainstorming session, to finalize all of the millions of details and to organize the workflow and finalize the script. A team of 100 to 150 artists worked on the film. All the visual elements for the film began as 2D drawings, before being transformed into 3D using Softimage XSI. The animation work was done by keyframe. 115,200 frames are animated for the film.

Carlton Communications acquired all UK licensing and distribution rights to the film in May 2003.

== Cancelled TV series ==
When the film was initially announced under the working title of Pinocchio 3001, it was stated the film would serve as a backdoor pilot for a 26 episode TV series depending on the success of the film.

== Video game ==
A video game based on the film was in development using the NetImmerse game engine.

== See also ==
- List of animated feature films
