= Arden R. Ryshpan =

- Born: Canada
- Occupations: Actress, casting director, Union Executive

Arden R. Ryshpan is a Canadian Casting director, and actress, working in French and English in a variety of capacities.

Arden R. Ryshpan is mainly known for her work on Virus (1980), My Bloody Valentine (French: Meurtres à la St-Valentin) (1981) and Quest for Fire (French: La guerre du feu (1981).

== Career ==
Having grown up in Montreal, Quebec, she is the daughter of Howard Ryshpan and Virginia Rae Burns, and followed her father's footsteps in the world of film and television. Arden Ryshpan was an actress, in the role of Gray Rat, in the series "Nic and Pic and the imposters", which appeared on December 31, 1975 on television in Montreal. While her father Howard Ryshpan had the role of Chief Rat. The screenplay was based on Professor Migraine, who assigns Nic and Pic the delicate task of looking for his latest invention. Two rats, disguised as Nic and Pic, try to steal the secret machine and photograph the plans.

She is Executive Director at Canadian Actors Equity Association since September 2007. She is chief negotiator and also responsible for lobbying and advocacy activities as well as the day-to-day operations of the organization.

Ryshpan was a faculty member of the Dawson College theater department and a member of the board of Director of the Dome Theatre (Montreal), administered by this Montreal's downtown college. Ryshpan was the spokesperson of the Quebec Union of Film and Video Technicians. Ryshpan was Chair of the National Women's Committee of ACTRA (Alliance of Canadian Cinema, Television and Radio Artists). During her mandate for the United Nations, she designed and presented a dissertation on the situation of career female artists. This thesis led to the creation of a charter of rights for career female artists. This charter is now in practice into artists unions in more than 50 countries.

After working for several years at ACTRA and the National Film Board of Canada (Assistant Executive Director in charge of film production in Canada), Ryshpan went to settle in Toronto where she served as general manager of the affairs of the Directors of Guild of Canada. She was responsible for negotiations, lobbying and the international representation of Canadian film and television Directors.

In 2021, she became the Executive Director at the Canadian Actors' Equity Association.

== Filmography ==
More than 30 feature film and television projects are credited to Arden R Ryshpan.

Casting department

1. 2000 Artificial Lies (casting: Montreal - as Arden Ryshpan)
2. 1986 The Boy in Blue (French: La race des champions) (casting: Montreal) / (extras casting)
3. 1982 Little Gloria... Happy at Last (French: Gloria ou la course au bonheur) (TV Mini-Series) (casting - 2 episodes): Part I (1982)... (casting: Montreal - as Arden Ryshpan); Part II (1982)... (casting: Montreal - as Arden Ryshpan)
4. 1981 La guerre du feu (casting: Montreal - as Arden Ryshpan)
5. 1981 Meurtres à la St-Valentin (casting consultant)
6. 1980 Virus (casting assistant - as Arden Ryshpan) - Hide Hide

Casting director

1. 2000 Artificial Lies
2. 1988 The Carpenter
3. 1984 Evil Judgment
4. 1984 Un printemps sous la neige
5. 1980 Pinball Summer
6. 1980 Les Motos sauvages (as Arden Ryshpan)

Miscellaneous Crew

1. 1981 Kings and Desperate Men (production assistant - as Arden Ryshpan)
2. 1980 Pinball Summer (dialogue coach)

Actor

- 1978 Les femmes de 30 ans - Berenice (as Arden Ryshpan)

Second Unit Director or Assistant Director

- 1979 The Spirit of Adventure: Night Flight (TV Movie) (assistant director - as Arden Ryshpan).

== See also ==
- Howard Ryshpan, her father
