= Emily LeBaron =

Canadian artist and philanthropist (death 1981)

- Born: 1906; North Hatley, Québec, Canada
- Died: 1983-06-10
- Occupation(s): Artist, antique dealer, art teacher and community organizer
- Years active: 1932-1980
- Known for: Creation and administration of the Piggery Theatre and the theater art Gallery

Emily LeBaron (April 1906 – June 10, 1983) (daughter of Jean B LeBaron and Joséphine Bean) was an artist, antiquarian, art teacher and community organizer, resident of North Hatley, MRC de Memphrémagog, in Estrie, in Quebec, Canada.

Emily LeBaron was a great friend of Janet Blake (married to Arthur Russell Virgin) who was an agricultural producer (Jersey dairy farm) and a philanthropist bringing the arts of all kinds. Janet Blake, who died in 1981, gave by particular bequest to Emily LeBaron, a 1915 watercolor painting painted by the artist Maurice Prendergast. This painting had been purchased in 1962 from Hirschl & Adler Galleries of New York (N.Y.). Around 1983, this painting was worth $100,000.

According to the 1911 census of Canada, Emily LeBaron (5 years old) lives with her parents in North Hatley. His father Jean LeBaron (born in March 1869) is indicated to be of French origin, general merchant and of Universalist faith; her mother Joséphine Bean (born in Dec. 1880) is reported of Scottish origin and of Anglican faith. Emily's family also appears in the 1921 census.

She died on June 10, 1983, at 77 years old. Her remains are buried in Lakeview Cemetery North Hatley. An auction sale for the "Estate of the Late Mrs. Emily LeBaron" was organized for June 7, 1997, to sell many pieces furnishing her house (antique sofa, chairs, antique pine boxes, antique Boston rocker, antique cradle, antique Warby chairs, etc.).

== Youth ==
Emily LeBaron attended North Hatley High School.

== Community implications ==
Since 1932, Emily LeBaron has been actively involved in the community work of North Hatley. In 1932, Emily LeBaron entertained the senior girls of the I.0.0. club for a week-end at Camp Glen Holm on Lake Massawippi. A company of Girl Guides has been organized by Miss Emily LeBaron, who acts as captain, with the Misses Helen Reed and Doris Guilds as lieu tenants. The company, which consists of twenty Guide members, is composed of three patrols.

This is the time when the "Flying Shuttle" (community center) opened under the aegis of the North Hatley Community Club of which Emily LeBaron was president, notably in 1942.

This community building, designated "Flying Shuttle", is a former school. The first floor consisted of a large kitchen and a large room for meetings of organizations (e.g. guides, scouts, women's clubs, the Legion, the Eastern Star), art exhibitions, training courses in particular pottery, weaving or painting for young people in summer. The second floor had a few offices, as well as a hall for concerts or theatrical activities. Formerly, this building also housed the offices of North Hatley Town Hall.

In July 1963, Emily LeBaron hosted an "Antique Fair" at Town Hall, bringing together lovers of antique items. The proceeds from this fair were used to cover the expenses of a building housing local charities, the North Hatley Community Club. The first mission of the "Flying Shuttle" was to get artisans to make useful art objects and market them to the public.

Emily LeBaron becomes one of the leaders of the Red Cross Society of North Hatley.

Since 1964, Emily LeBaron has been very involved at Piggery Theatre, as an organizer and supporter. She sat on the board of the Guild of which she was president in 1972, and also did many of the daily chores at the Piggery. In 1976, she acted as secretary of the Township Playhouse Guild which administered the Piggery Theatre. In 1980, she was correspondence secretary. At a recognition dinner in Sept. 1979, Guild President Larry Shouldice said Emily LeBaron was the soul of the Piggery Theater.

== Public tributes ==
The Municipality of North Hatley designated Emily LeBaron Park, which was sold around 2013 by the Village Improvement Society to a developer for real estate development.

The North Hatley Community Center was named Emily LeBaron's Flying Shuttle in her honor; it was so designated in 1980. The Mena'sen Gallery exhibition took place in the summer of 1980 at the Flying Shuttle and in the summer of 1981 at the North Hatley Gallery located on Sherbrooke Road in the village of North Hatley, with the collaboration of Emily LeBaron.

In September 1979, the community of North Hatley paid warm tribute to Mrs. Janet Blake-Virgin (widow of Arthur Russell Virgin) (deceased 1981) and Miss Emily LeBaron during a meal community to recognize their dedication and support to many organizations in the region. These two ladies had a great friendship between them; they often mingled socially and participated in common causes, notably the North Hatley Community Club and the Piggery Theatre.

Following the death of Emily LeBaron in June 1983, the Piggery Theater named its art gallery after her; this gallery is located in the entrance hall of the building of the old pigsty. This art gallery exhibits an extensive collection of works by various artists and styles from the region.

== North Hatley Residence ==
Emily LeBaron lived in an old house in North Hatley built in 1830. Having become an antique dealer by passion, Emily collected valuable antiques in her home. She collected in particular antique furniture brought from old attics that the locals brought to her after cleaning.

In addition, she collected old items such as period prints, carvings, crafts, religious worship articles, kitchen utensils, toys, sporting goods, etc. She was busy restoring old items such as furniture.

Its basement was used as a shop for the renovation of old objects and as a pottery workshop. Dave Mullavey taught pottery classes there under the aegis of the Community Club. In addition, Emily LeBaron taught loom skills and needlework.

== See also ==
- North Hatley
- Piggery Theatre
- Janet Blake
