= North Hatley =

- Village municipality
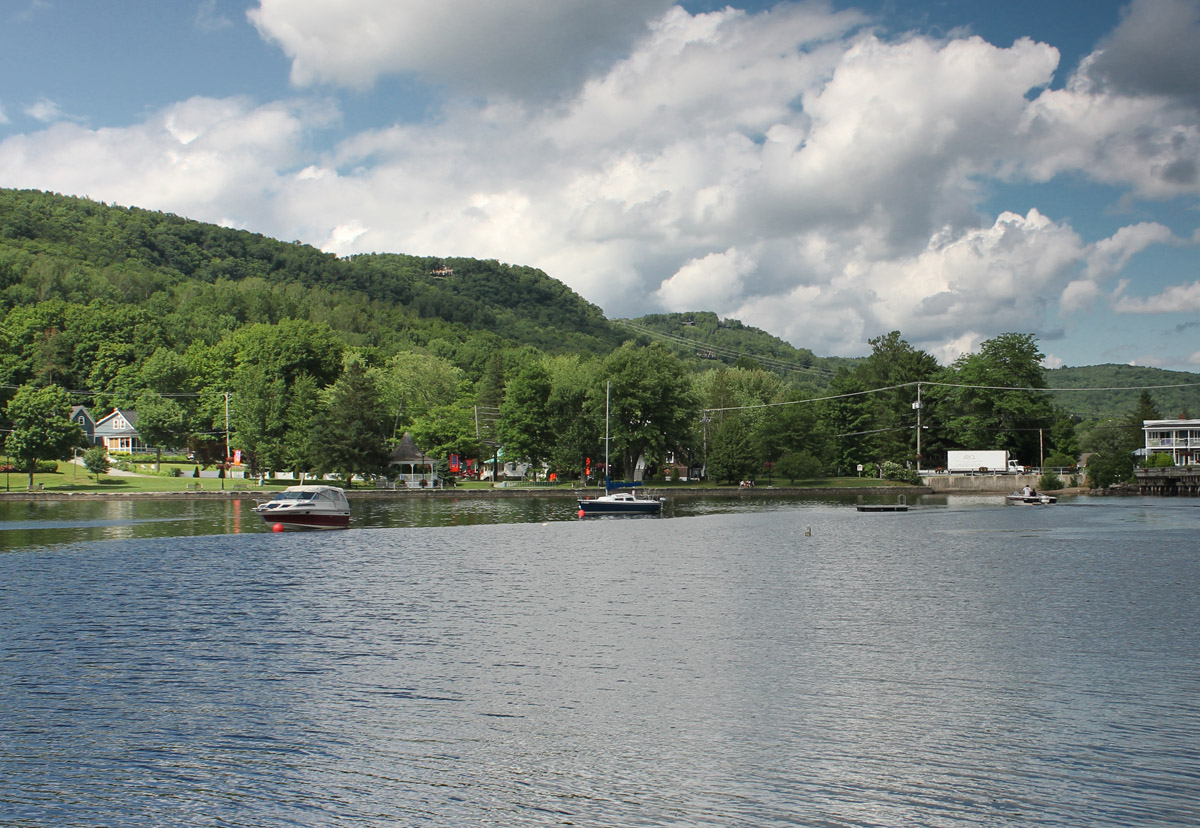

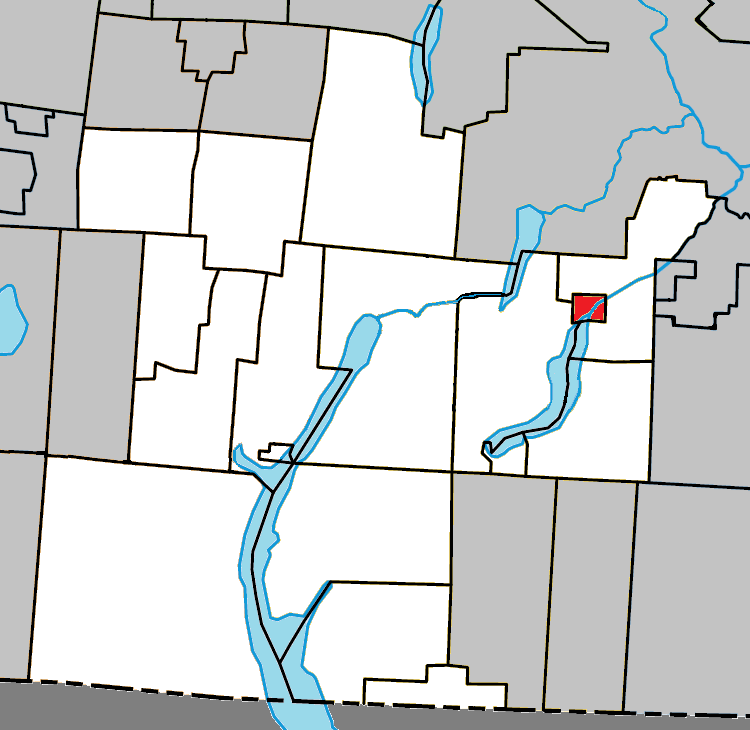
- Location within Memphrémagog RCM

- Location in southern Quebec
- Coordinates: 45°17′N 71°58′W
- Country: Canada
- Province: Quebec
- Region: Estrie
- RCM: Memphrémagog
- Constituted: October 25, 1897
- Named for: Hatley, Cambridgeshire

Government
  - Mayor: Marcella Davis Gerrish (2021–Present)
  - Federal riding: Compton—Stanstead
  - Prov. riding: Orford

Area
  - Total: 4.60 km^{2} (1.78 sq mi)
  - Land: 3.35 km^{2} (1.29 sq mi)
- Elevation: 167 m (548 ft)

Population (2016)
  - Total: 632
  - Density: 188.4/km^{2} (488/sq mi)
  - Pop 2011-2016: ▼3.4%
  - Dwellings: 448
- Time zone: UTC−5 (EST)
  - Summer (DST): UTC−4 (EDT)
- Postal code(s): J0B 2C0
- Area code: 819
- Highways: R-108
- Website: www.northhatley.org

North Hatley is a village of 675 people (2021 Census), located at the north end of Lake Massawippi. It is part of the Memphrémagog Regional County Municipality in the Eastern Townships region of Quebec, Canada, also known as Estrie or Cantons de l'Est in French.

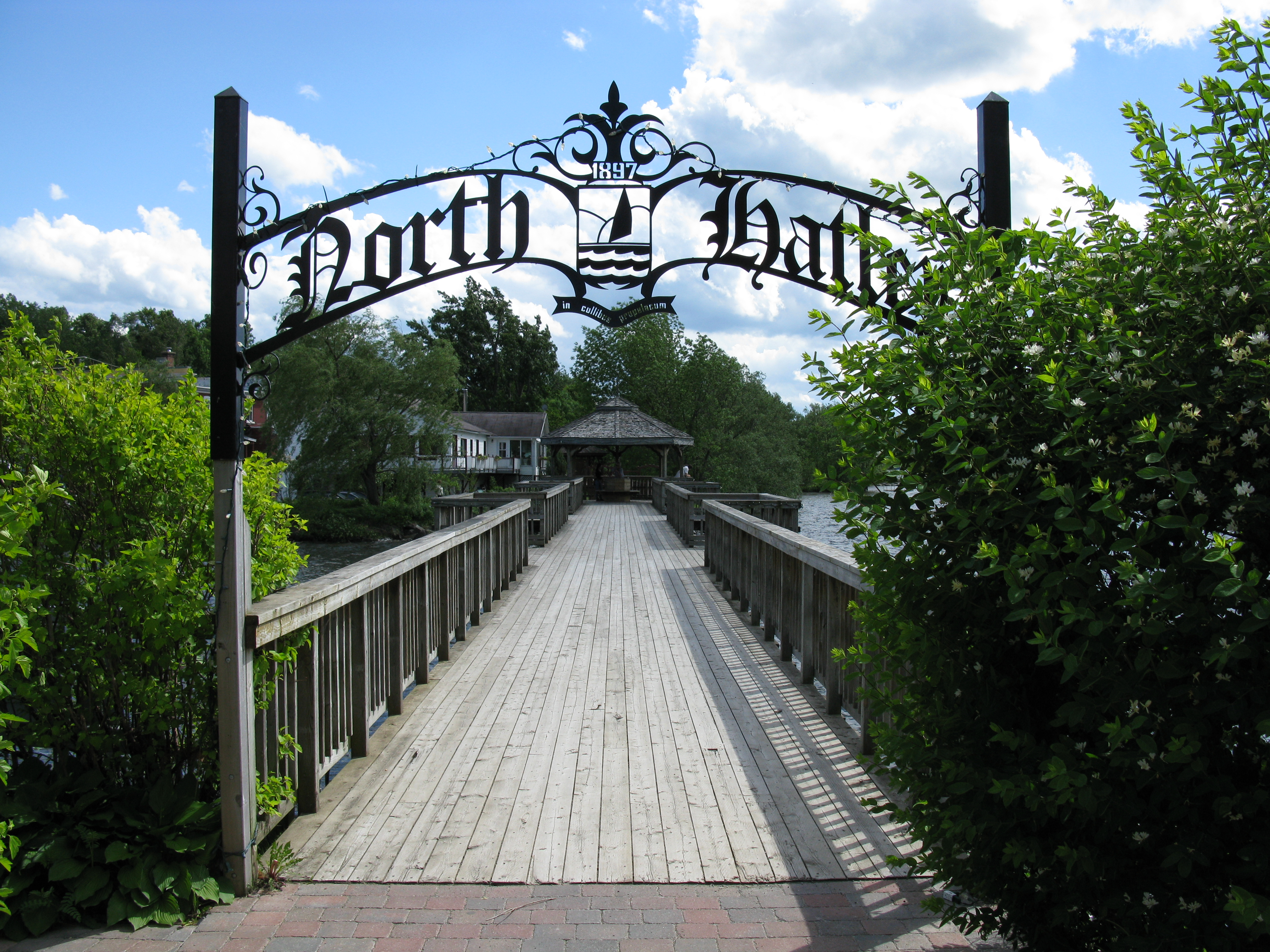
A pier on Lake Massawippi.

Locals usually have to drive to the nearby towns of Magog or Sherbrooke to find big-city amenities, although there are smaller stores and cafés in the town which are open year-round.

== History ==
Many of the first settlers around North Hatley were United Empire Loyalists, mostly farmers, who left New England in the years following the American Declaration of Independence in 1776.

The village owes most of its great houses and particular architecture to its first aristocrats, and mostly Americans from south of the Mason–Dixon line.

== Demographics ==
Historical census populations
| Year | Pop. | ±% |
|---|---|---|
| 1986 | 715 | — |
| 1991 | 704 | −1.5% |
| 1996 | 758 | +7.7% |
| 2001 | 746 | −1.6% |
| 2006 | 722 | −3.2% |
| 2011 | 654 | −9.4% |
| 2016 | 632 | −3.4% |
Source: Statistics Canada

In the 2021 Census of Population conducted by Statistics Canada, North Hatley had a population of 675 living in 319 of its 450 total private dwellings, a change of 6.8% from its 2016 population of 632. With a land area of 3.35 km^{2} (1.29 sq mi), it had a population density of 201.5/km^{2} (521.9/sq mi) in 2021.

Canada census – North Hatley community profile

| | 2021 | 2016 | 2011 |
| Population | 675 (+6.8% from 2016) | 632 (-3.4% from 2011) | 654 (-9.4% from 2006) |
| Land area | 3.35 km^{2} (1.29 sq mi) | 3.35 km^{2} (1.29 sq mi) | 3.34 km^{2} (1.29 sq mi) |
| Population density | 201.5/km^{2} (522/sq mi) | 188.4/km^{2} (488/sq mi) | 195.9/km^{2} (507/sq mi) |
| Median age | 57.6 (M: 56.8, F: 58.4) | 56.1 (M: 54.0, F: 56.9) | 56.0 (M: 55.2, F: 57.6) |
| Private dwellings | 315 (total) | 448 (total) | 458 (total) |
| Median household income | | $57,024 | $51,891 |

References: 2021 2016 2011

== Local government ==
List of former mayors:

- Stephan Doré (2001–2009)
- Michael Page (2009–2021)
- Marcella Davis Gerrish (2021–Present)

== In media ==
North Hatley was the location for the shooting of a few films, including Secret Window with Johnny Depp.

North Hatley was mentioned in the television show The X-Files as the location of the Cigarette Smoking Man's hideout (in the episode "The Red and the Black").

North Hatley was the setting for the 2003 film Hatley High. Some of its landmarks, including the North Hatley sign, can be seen throughout the movie. However, the bulk of the movie was filmed in Hudson.

== Notable people ==
Several Canadian Modernist poets, including F. R. Scott, Louis Dudek, Ralph Gustafson and D. G. Jones, have lived in North Hatley.

It is also home to many artists and craftspeople, including Emily LeBaron, an artist, antiquarian, art teacher and community organizer.

North Hatley also has in its history philanthropists well committed to their community, such as Janet Blake.

== See also ==
- List of anglophone communities in Quebec
- List of village municipalities in Quebec
