= Michael Flachmann =

American stage actor and teacher

- Born: November 3, 1942
- Died: 8 August 2013 (aged 70); Cedar City, Utah
- Occupations: Theater teacher specialized on Shakespeare, writer, and judo and tennis coach
- Spouse(s): Kim Flachmann, also a professor at CSUB

Michael Flachmann (November 3, 1942 – August 8, 2013) was an American stage actor, dramaturg and teacher in art at California State University, Bakersfield (CSUB) since 1972 as a specialist in Shakespeare and Renaissance literature.

== Biography ==
As teacher at CSUB of Bakersfield, California, he had a productive life, contributing to the success of many students in art, notably by bringing them to love Shakespeare, theater and literature.

Flachmann had a particular expertise in Shakespeare's work. For over 25 years, he work as dramaturg at the Utah Shakespeare Festival, founded in 1988. His family report that, in 2013, he even placed his motorized home in his Camp Shakespeare Program on the 25th anniversary of the Festival for better coordinating.

Flachmann was an enthusiastic coach in tennis and judo. For years, he acted as an assistant coach to the CSUB Women's Tennis team. Beyond his coaching for female athletes, he spent a lot of time coaching them on how to reach both their personal and professional goals. In addition to his athletic prowess in judo, he acted as a guide for the academic progress of his students.

== Rewards ==
- In 1993, Michael Flachmann was awarded the CSU Outstanding Professor award.
- Named the U.S. Professor of the Year by the Carnegie Foundation in 1995.

== Main Published Works ==
Shakespeare

- Shakespeare's Lovers: A Text for Performance and Analysis, by Libby Appel and Professor Michael Flachmann PhD, Oct 25, 1982.
- Shakespeare's Women: A Playscript for Performance and Analysis

by Libby Appel and Professor Michael Flachmann PhD, Mar 27, 1986.

- Shakespeare, From Page to Stage: An Anthology of the Most Popular Plays and Sonnets

by Michael Flachmann, Feb 6, 2006.

- Shakespeare in Performance: Inside the Creative Process, by Professor Michael Flachmann PhD, May 30, 2011.

Prose readers

- The Brief Prose Reader: Essays for Thinking, Reading, and Writing

by Kim Flachmann, Michael Flachmann, et al., Dec 6, 2002.

- Prose Reader and TFC Swatch Kit, by Kim Flachmann and Michael Flachmann, May 11, 2012.
- The Prose Reader: Essays for Thinking, Reading and Writing, MLA Update (11th Edition), by Kim Flachmann and Michael Flachmann, Feb 9, 2017.
- Revel for The Prose Reader: Essays for Thinking, Reading and Writing - Access Card (12th Edition), Kim Flachmann and Michael Flachmann, February 11, 2019.

Nexus

- Nexus & Mycomplab New Sac, by Kim Flachmann and Michael Flachmann, Dec 23, 2011.
- Nexus: A Rhetorical Reader for Writers (2nd Edition) (Mywritinglab), Kim Flachmann and Michael Flachmann, January 11, 2014.
- Accelerated Learning Workbook for Nexus: A Rhetorical Reader for Writers

by Kim Flachmann and Michael Flachmann, Jul 20, 2014.

Others

- Companion Website - Flachmann, by Michael Flachmann, Sep 30, 2003.
- Journal of the Wooden O Symposium (Volume 7) 2007, by Sanner Garofalo Stephanie Chamberlain, Miranda Giles, Francois-Xavier Gleyzon, Becky Kemper, Chikako D. Mumamoto, Jean Reid Norman, John M. Sullivan, Michael Flachmann, Jan 1, 2007.
- Reader's Choice: Essays and Stories, Canadian Edition, by Kim Flachmann, Michael Flachmann, et al., May 15, 2002.
