= Lake Magog =

Lake in Quebec, Canada

- Lac Magog (French)
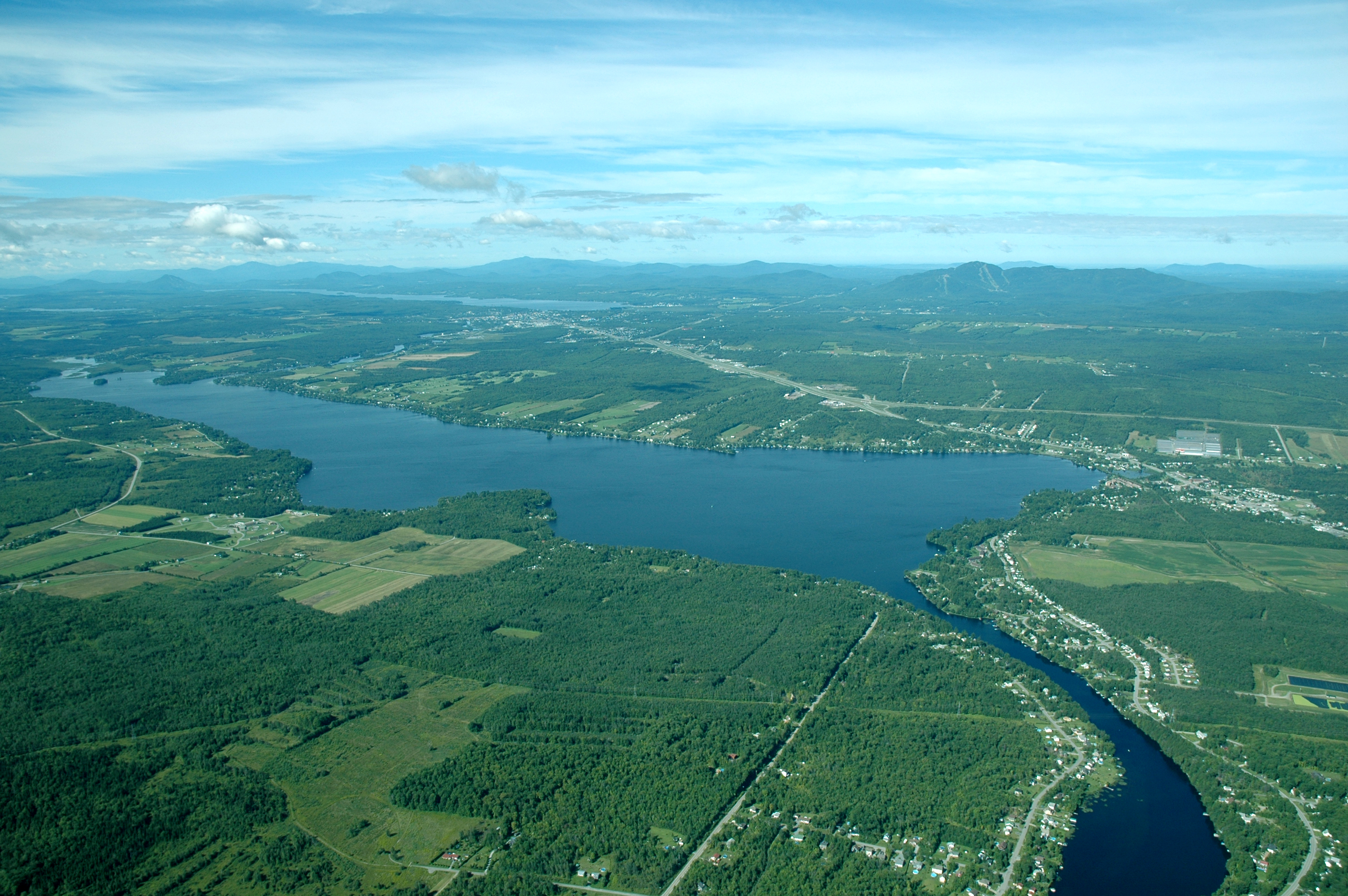
- Aerial view of Lake Magog

- Location within Quebec
- Location: Memphrémagog Regional County Municipality, Estrie, Quebec
- Coordinates: 45°18′11″N 72°02′35″W
- Lake type: Natural
- Primary inflows: Magog River
- Primary outflows: Magog River
- Catchment area: 1,955.5 square kilometres (755.0 sq mi)
- Basin countries: Canada
- Max. length: 11.1 kilometres (6.9 mi)
- Max. width: 2.09 kilometres (1.30 mi)
- Surface area: 10.8 square kilometres (4.2 sq mi)
- Average depth: 8.65 metres (28.4 ft)
- Max. depth: 18.85 metres (61.8 ft)
- Islands: 8 (all private), including 2 islets, as well as 2 shoals
- Settlements: Sainte-Catherine-de-Hatley, Magog, Sherbrooke

Lake Magog is a freshwater lake located in the Estrie region of Quebec, Canada. It is bordered by three municipalities: Sherbrooke, Magog and Sainte-Catherine-de-Hatley. Located in the Appalachian geological province, Lake Magog consists of sedimentary rock, especially slate and sandstone. Lake Magog is part of the watershed of the St. Francois River, which flows into the St. Lawrence River.

== Hydrology ==
The drainage area of the Magog River's watershed is 2,032 square kilometres (785 sq mi). Lake Magog's the maximum length and width are 11.1 kilometres (6.9 mi) and 2.1 kilometres (1.3 mi), respectively. Its area is 10.8 square kilometres (4.2 sq mi). The maximum depth is 18.85 metres (61.8 ft) and its and average depth is 8.65 metres (28.4 ft). Lake Magog's water is supplied mainly by the Magog River which flows from Lake Memphremagog. There are a couple of streams of different sizes that feed the river and Lake Magog.

Four hydroelectric dams were built near Lake Magog. Their role is to generate electricity and control the level of water. Magog Lake is a reservoir resulting from these dams, the most influential being that of Rock Forest built in 1911. These dams alter the rate of renewal of the lake by changing the flow of the Magog River.

Lake Magog contains eight islands (all private), including two islets, as well as two shoals which have been small islands in the past. Two islands are constructed: the island of the nautical club, and the largest island of the Marinier Archipelago (also known as Odanak Islands). At the southern end of the lake, a 65 hectares (160 acres) marsh is accessible to hikers.
