= Dome Theatre (Montreal) =

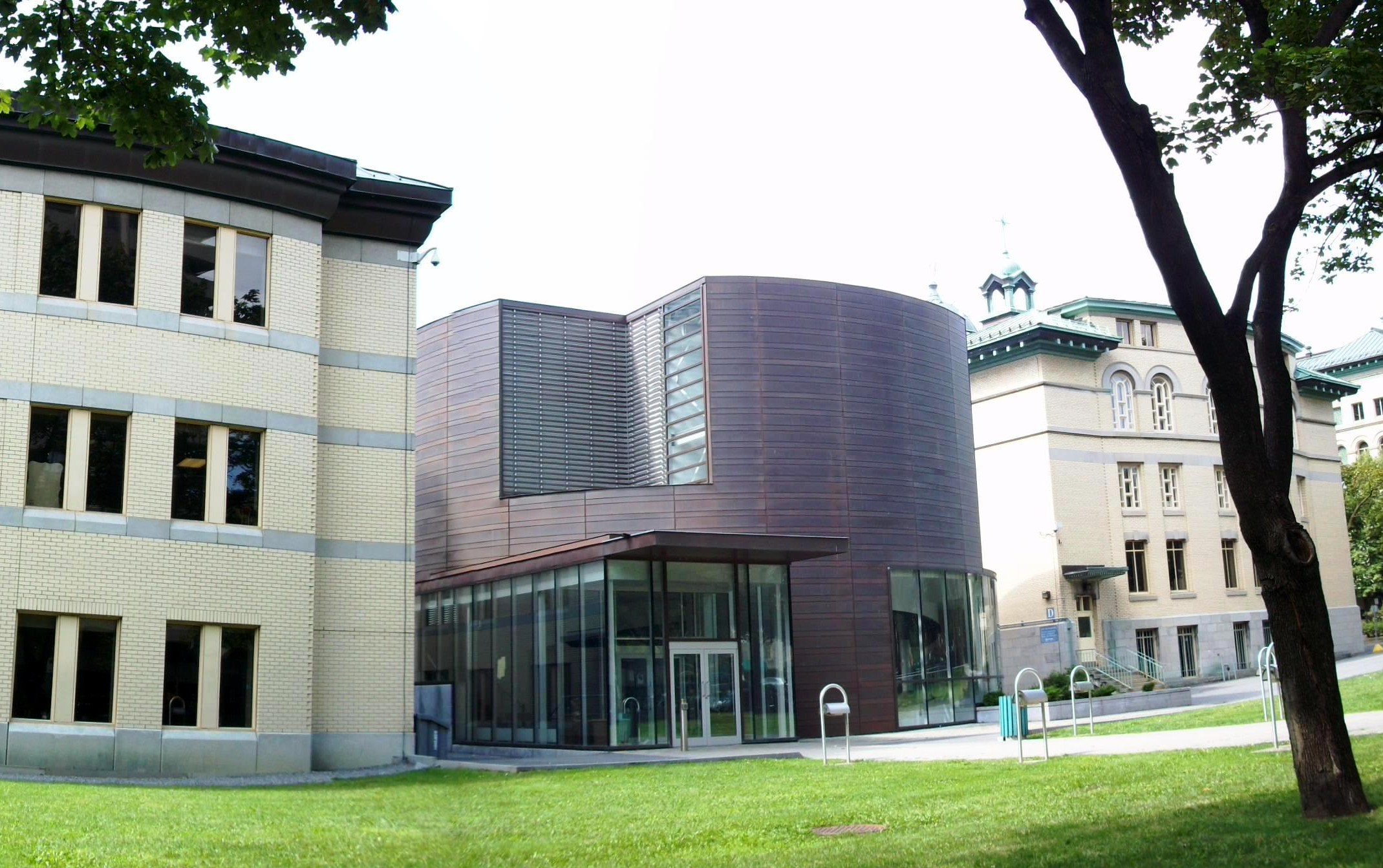
- Interactive map of Dome Theatre
- Address: 2000 rue Atwater, Montreal, Quebec, Canada, H3Z 1A4
- Location: Downtown of Montreal
- Owner: Dawson College
- Operator: Dawson Professional Theatre Program
- Capacity: 190 seats

Construction
- Built: 2007
- Cost: US$10.5 million

The Dome Theatre building is located downtown at 2000 rue Atwater, in downtown Montreal, in Quebec, in Canada. It is part of Dawson College.

The Dawson Professional Theatre Program has greatly contributed to the affirmation and international recognition of its artists, directors and English-speaking support staff. In Montreal, the Dome Theatre is a place for advanced training in the performing arts. His students and his theatre teachers have enriched cultural life in Montreal.

The theatre department at Dawson College offers a three-year theatre program. Studio Productions are performed in Dome Theatre by students in their 2nd year of the Dawson Theatrical Program. Major Productions are performed by students in their 3rd and final year of the Program.

== History ==
The Vendôme theatre existed at 3990 Notre-Dame West, Montreal, until 1974, the year it was acquired by Dawson College as a rental facility. Then, this theatre was renamed "Dome Theatre". This downtown theatre became the central physical plant of the Dawson Professional Theatre Program and the program's productions were presented there until 2007.

In 2000, the first feasibility study for Phase V of Dawson theatre extension project was initiated by Director General Patrick Woodsworth and Pierre Beaulieu, Director of Plant and Facilities. The initial proposal design provided 183 seats.

After six years of studying the project, the Quebec government announced in Mid-November 2006 $8.5 million for the construction of a new theatre and the expansion of an atrium. The new construction which is adjacent to Dawson College, was completed in the summer of 2007. The total construction project which amounted to approximately $10.5 million, was subsidized under a Quebec-Canada agreement supporting linguistic minorities. Designed in an Elizabethan style, the new theatre has 190 seats and the atrium 350 seats.

In mid-November, when the award was announced, Prime Minister Jean Charest said: "This theatre is the future of Dawson College to bring out the best talent in Quebec."

== Theatre training ==
General offer of theatre training in Montreal

In Montreal, the main academic establishments providing professional English language theatre training are: Concordia University, McGill University, National Theatre School of Canada, John Abbott College and Dawson College.

These educational institutions in English theatre in Montreal offer in particular:

- a detailed calendar of upcoming theatrical events in Montreal;
- documentation on professional theatre training programs provided by educational institutions of Montreal;
- documentation on training activities for adults and children, as well as summer theatre programs;
- obtaining tickets for theatrical shows;
- useful references to professional arts organizations and unions, arts councils, service organizations, etc;
- announcements on theatre hearing notices, calls for tenders and administrative positions;
- recognition competition in performing arts.

Specific training at Dawson College

This Dawson College three-year training program to become a professional actor covers a variety of actor techniques. The program notably includes training on the history of the theatre, with reference to classical and contemporary texts. It also includes studio lessons on theatre, improvisation, voice techniques, actor movements, dance, stage combat and camera games. This training brings students' skills development through performances in studios and on the stage of the new Dawson theatre.

The plays performed by the students and directed by the teachers of the theatre department at Dawson College are presented to the public at the Dome Theatre.

The training program to become a professional actor include preparing graduates for the world of professional artists' work. They include in particular the definition of their offer of artist services, their online self-promotion (e.g. photos, voice recording or artistic demonstration), preparation for artistic contests or auditions such as general auditions for the Quebec Dramatic Art Federation. The program also includes information on artists' agents and their selection criteria; on the film and theatrical production industry in Montreal and Quebec.

Generally, students and graduates of this theatre program have a variety of career opportunities, including working with professional organizations hiring artists in theatre, television, film, radio, and today on platforms digital.

== See also ==
- Dawson College

== Other links ==
- Playwrights Canada Press
- Canadian Theatre Encyclopedia
- The Canadian Theatre Record
