= Sainte-Catherine-de-Hatley =

- Municipality
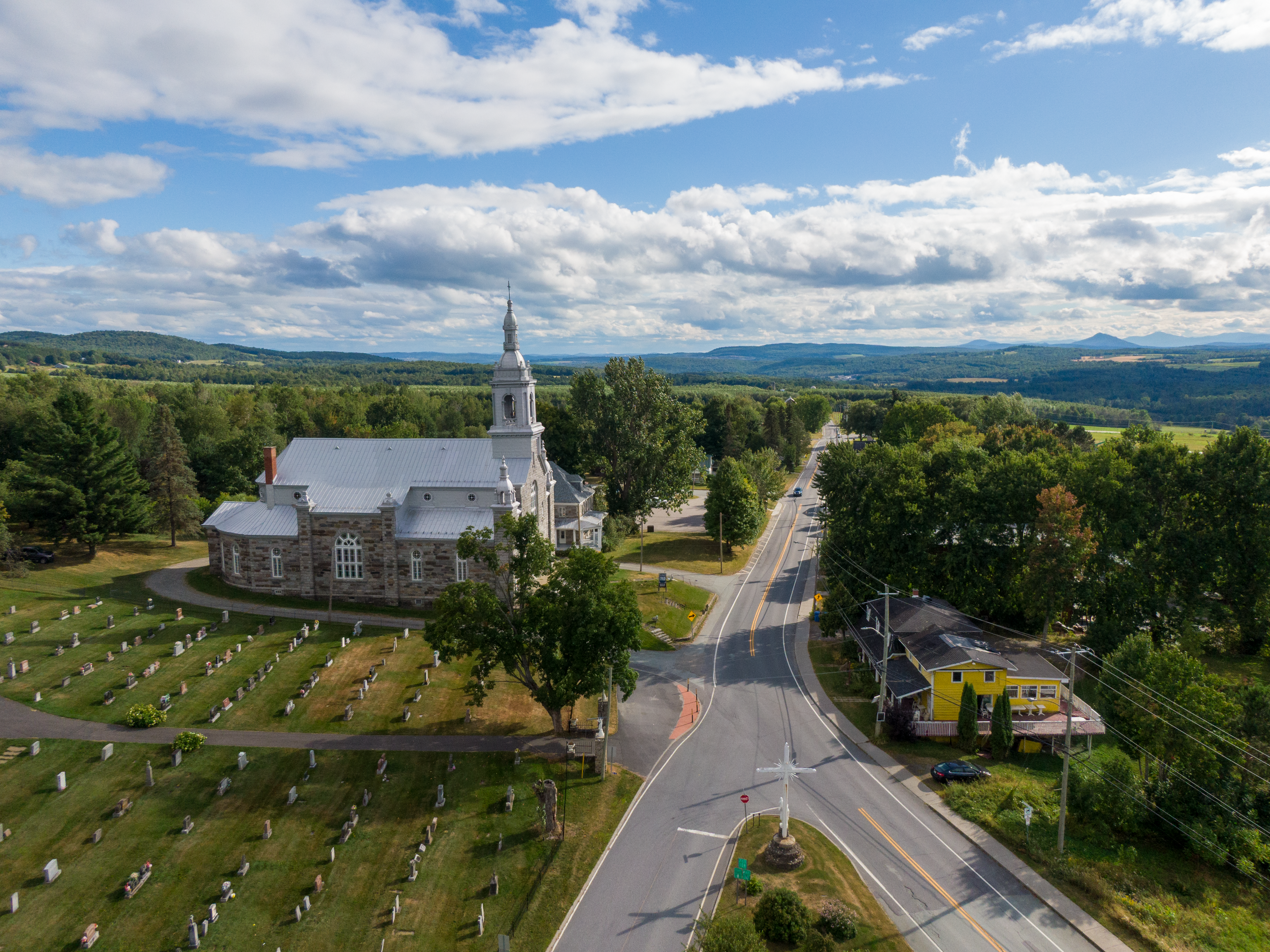
- Sainte-Catherine-de-Hatley in 2025

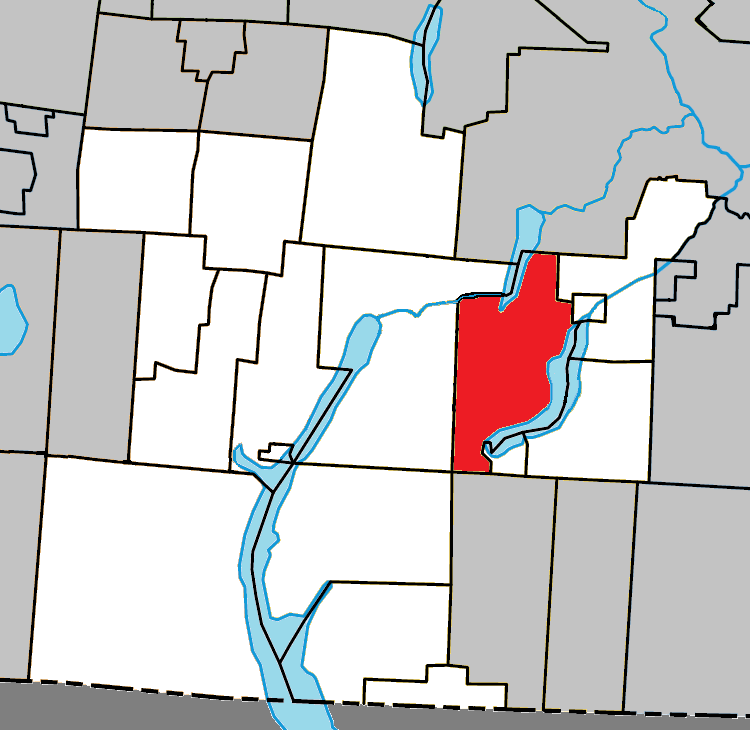
- Location within Memphrémagog RCM

- Location in southern Quebec
- Coordinates: 45°15′N 72°03′W
- Country: Canada
- Province: Quebec
- Region: Estrie
- RCM: Memphrémagog
- Constituted: March 28, 1901

Government
  - Mayor: Jacques Demers
  - Federal riding: Compton—Stanstead
  - Prov. riding: Orford

Area
  - Total: 99.20 km^{2} (38.30 sq mi)
  - Land: 86.34 km^{2} (33.34 sq mi)

Population (2021)
  - Total: 2,741
  - Density: 31.7/km^{2} (82/sq mi)
  - Pop 2016-2021: ▲10.6%
  - Dwellings: 1,429
- Time zone: UTC−5 (EST)
  - Summer (DST): UTC−4 (EDT)
- Postal code(s): J0B 1W0
- Area code: 819
- Highways A-55: R-108; R-141; R-216
- Website: www.sainte-catherine-de-hatley.ca

Sainte-Catherine-de-Hatley is a municipality in the Memphrémagog Regional County Municipality in the Eastern Townships region of Quebec, Canada.

Located along Quebec Route 108 on Little Lake Magog, it is the home of the "Marais" birdwatching sanctuary, the Eglise Sainte Catherine de Hatley, as well as the Dominique Savio primary School.

The place was previously known as "Katevale".

"Originally, a mission was established in 1845 under the name of Sainte-Catherine-de-Hatley and was canonically erected in 1890. Subsequently, a municipality of the same name was created in 1901".

== Geography ==
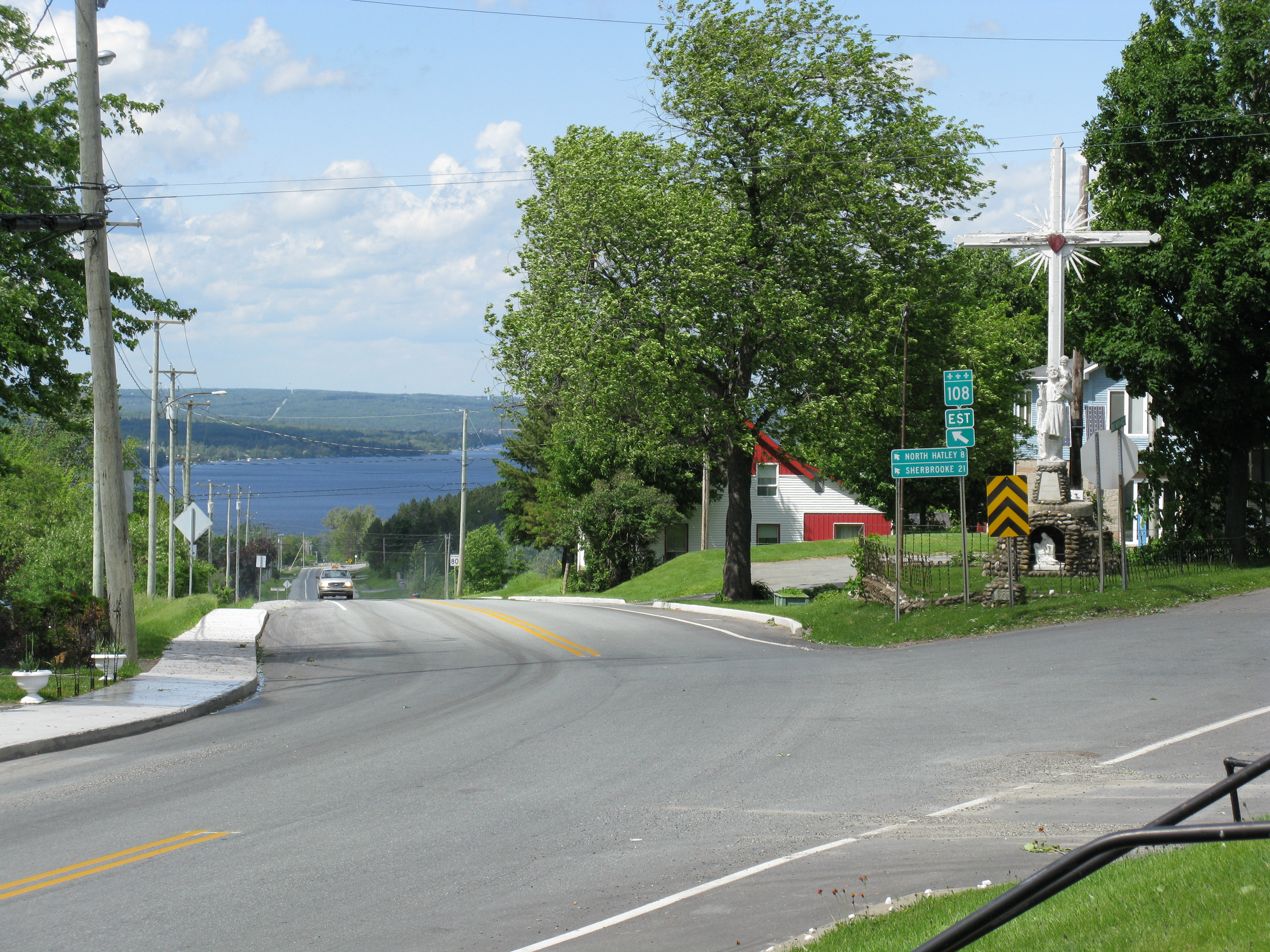
The lake Magog view at Sainte-Catherine-de-Hatley

Sainte-Catherine-de-Hatley is located 10 km south of Sherbrooke and 10 km east of Magog, between the southeast shore of lake Magog and the west shore of lake Massawippi.

== Attractions ==
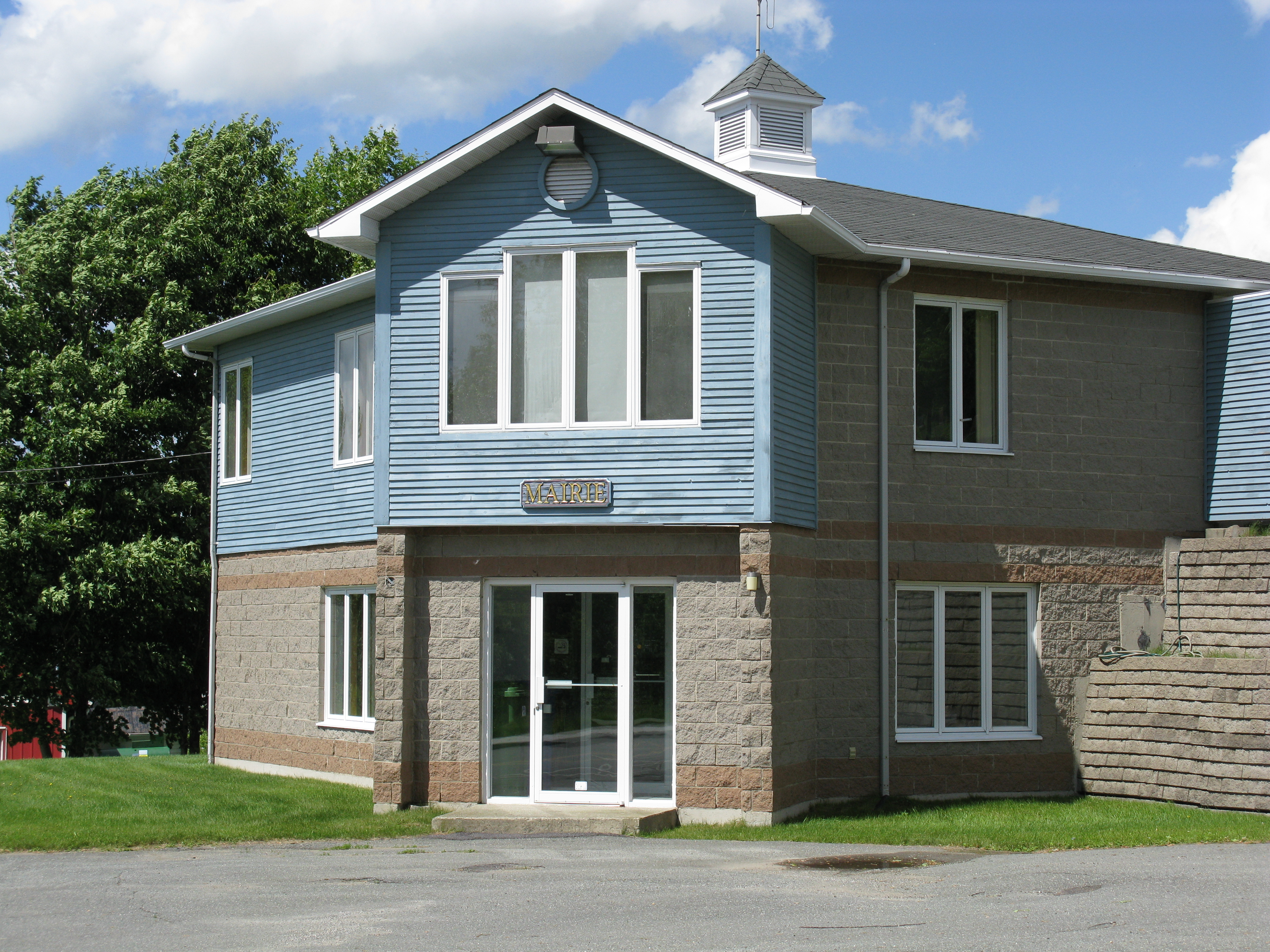
Sainte-Catherine-de-Hatley town hall

Sainte-Catherine-de-Hatley includes a church, a cemetery, a community hall, two lakes (in part), Île du Marais, an inn-restaurant, a convenience store, a canteen, a butcher, a campsite, a horticulture center, a dog park, a theater, an antique dealer, a credit union, a primary school, a town hall as well as several tourist and recreational facilities.

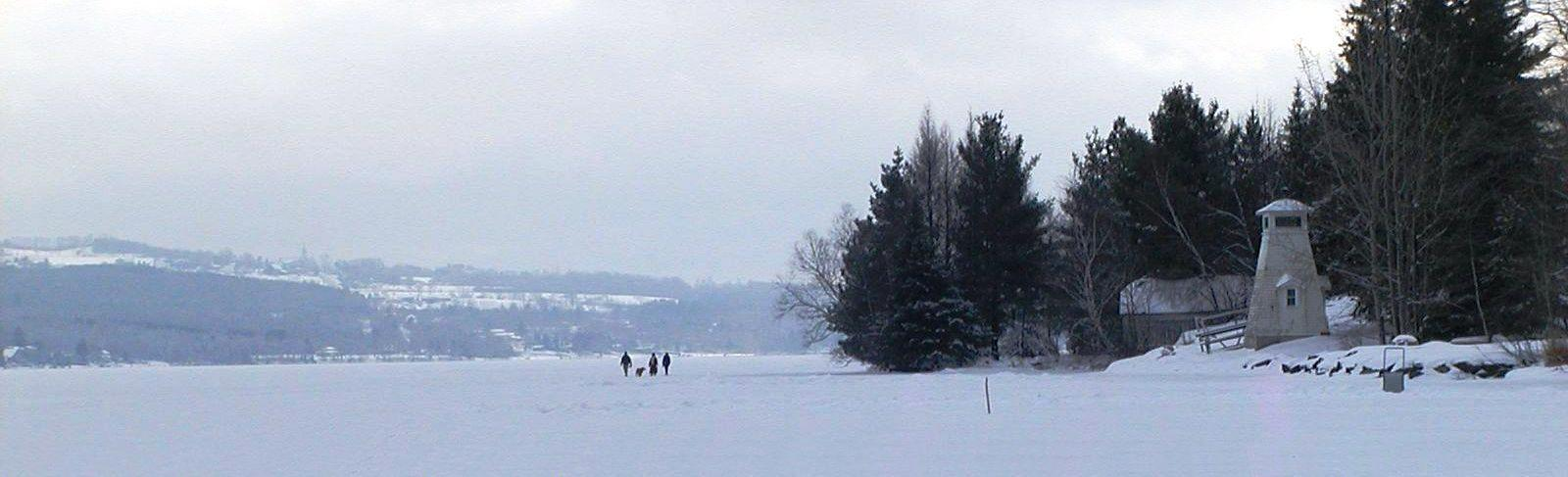
Sainte-Catherine-de-Hatley seen from lake Magog in winter.

== See also ==
- Piggery Theatre
- Arthur Russell Virgin
- List of municipalities in Quebec
