= David O'Keefe =

David O'Keefe or O'Keeffe may refer to:

- David O'Keefe (ship captain) (died 1901), Irish-American ship captain and politician
- David O'Keefe (Australian politician) (1864–1943)
- David O'Keefe (historian) (born 1967), professor of history, television presenter and author
- David O'Keefe (racing driver) in 1970 Hardie-Ferodo 500
- David O'Keefe (runner) in 1988 IAAF World Cross Country Championships – Senior men's race
- David O'Keefe (New York City) from 78th New York State Legislature
- David O'Keeffe (lawyer) (born 1953)
- David O'Keeffe (footballer) (born 1962), former Australian rules footballer
