= Bishop's College School =

Preparatory school in Sherbrooke, Quebec

Coordinates: 45.371313°N 71.842081°W

Location
- 80 Chemin Moulton Hill; Sherbrooke, Québec

Information
- School type: Independent, day and boarding, co-educational nonprofit institution, university-preparatory high school
- Motto: Recti Cultus Pectora Roborant (Correct learning strengthens character)

Patrimoine culturel du Québec
- Type: Patrimoine immobilier
- Religious affiliation: Anglican Church of Canada (inactive)
- Established: 1836; 190 years ago King's Hall: 1874
- Head of School: Kurt Johnson
- Staff: 150
- Faculty: 45
- Grades: 7–12
- Enrollment: 265
- Language: Majorily English with some French immersion
- Campus: 270-acre (1.1 km^{2}); Little Forks -> Moulton Hill.
- Colours: Purple and White
- Mascot: Bears
- Endowment: C$ 25 million
- Affiliation: CAIS+, QAIS, FEEP de Québec, TABS, the U.S. NAIS and NEPSAC, etc.
- Visitor: The Right Hon. David Johnston
- Website: www.bishopscollegeschool.com

Bishop's College School or BCS is an English-language non-profit independent boarding prep school in Sherbrooke, Quebec, Canada for students in Grades 7 to 12. Founded in 1836, BCS is the fifth oldest private school in Canada. BCS has the highest endowment per student of any independent school in Canada. Seven BCS people have been named Rhodes Scholars. A royal charter was granted in 1853 from Queen Victoria for Bishop's College when BCS was the constituent junior division. The school was recognized as the "Eton of Canada" initially by the first Governor General of Canada, Lord Monck on a visit in 1864. It locates at the heart the historic Eastern Townships and near New England. The school is recognized as a Quebec cultural heritage site in the Répertoire du patrimoine culturel du Québec.

BCS was first known as the Lennoxville Classical School by the Rev. Lucius Doolittle (1800–1862) assisted by Edward Chapman (M.A., Cambridge). Traditionally, the school catered to the sons of the Protestant elites in the United Empire Loyalists and the residents of the Montreal Golden Square Mile. A link to the Canadian Royal Family was maintained by King Edward VII, George V, George VI, Edward VIII, et alia whether during royal visits or whilst studying in Canada. In May 1989, The Duke of Edinburgh inspected BCS cadet corps and presented the school a new coat of arms. The BCS Cadet Corps #2 is the oldest continuous service corps in Canada – has been affiliated with the Black Watch. Over 120 alumni made the ultimate sacrifice in the First and Second World War.

King's Hall Compton, or KHC, its sister school, was founded in 1874 where heads of BCS such as James Williams acted as the first chairman. In 1972, the two institutions merged making it one of the first co-ed independent schools in Canada. The same year, KHC closed its doors and its staff and students were transferred to BCS. In 1995, Nancy Layton was appointed as Head of School, which made BCS the first co-ed independent school with a female headmaster in Canada. The School's former faculty was also responsible for the founding of Trinity College School in Port Hope, Ontario in 1865, and Ashbury College as an affiliated institute in 1891 to accommodate BCS Ottawa-based students. BCS raised six Canadian independent schools in total, making it once known as the "school of the headmasters" during the early 20th century.

"Bishop" in the school's name derives from one of its founders, the Lord Bishop of Québec, the Right Reverend George Mountain, the first Principal of McGill University from 1824 to 1835, and the founder of Bishop's University who intended to create a preparatory grammar school for these two universities. Today, the school's senior students may be eligible to take credit courses at Bishop's University for advanced standing. Some facilities of Bishop's University are used by BCS such as the swimming pool, golf course, rinks, library, etc. In academics, the school offers the Provincial Diplomas of Québec and New Brunswick along with optional and selective Advanced Placement and International Baccalaureate curricula, under a rigorous academic environment. The school has been a member of the Round Square since 1986 and affiliated to (CAIS+) (founding member since 1981), QAIS, FEEP de Québec, TABS, the U.S. NAIS and NEPSAC, etc. The students are from around 40 countries.

The school is notable for its mandatory athletic programs, where the alumni community includes multiple Olympians and five current members of the National Hockey League (NHL).

== History ==
=== Lennoxville Classical School, the beginnings and growth ===
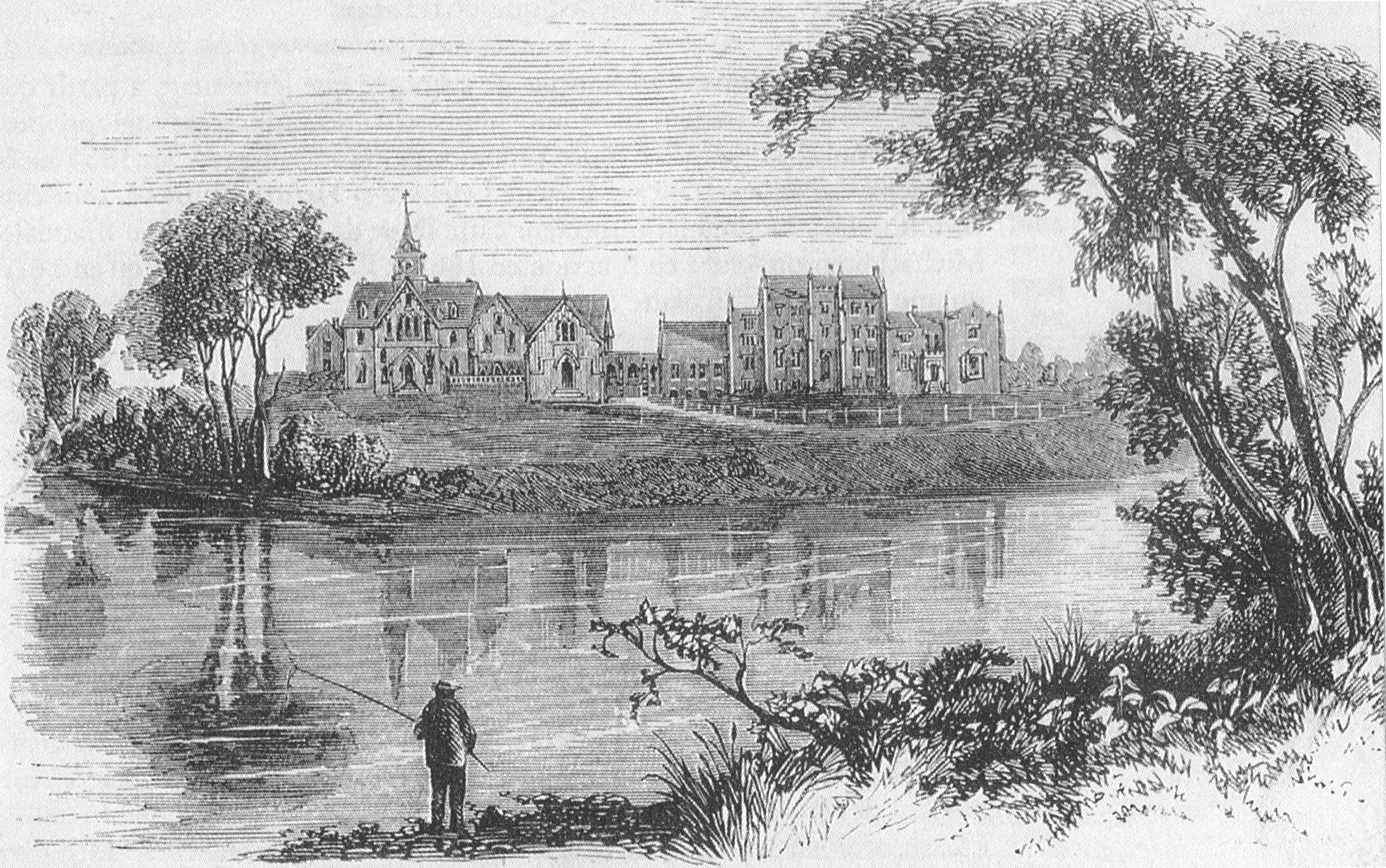
BCS Little Forks Campus in 1865 (building on the left)

Around 1834, the Church of England in Canada Rector of Sherbrooke and Lennoxville, the Rev. Lucius Doolittle M.A. (1800–1862, American) from New England built Elmwood, to serve as a rectory of the Sherbrooke–Lennoxville mission. It is still standing at 43 Queen Street. (Elmwood Hotel Today). With assistance from Edward Chapman (M.A., Cambridge, a professor of classics at McGill University) and financial support from the church policy supporting public education in the province, he opened a school in a wing of the rectory, in 1836 which became the Lennoxville Classical School. The school was designed for "the education of sons of English Gentlemen", as the local anglophone and Protestant elites (especially the ones in the United Empire Loyalist) settling in the Lower Canada were in need of a suitable preparatory school for their children. Lennoxville Classical School was modeled on the great public schools of Britain, especially Eton College but provided a bilingual environment and an immersion into Canadian culture under the Church of England spiritual atmosphere. The. Hon Edward Hale provided legal and finance assistance on top of the church.

Bishop's University was established in 1843 as Bishop's College and remained under the Anglican church's direction from its founding until 1947. At the beginning of the establishment, the main students of BCS came from the merchant/political families of the Ross, Gault, Stoker, McConnell, MacLernon, Price, Bronfman, Molson, MacDougall, McNaughton in the Golden Square Mile residential area of Montreal.

In 1861 the foundation stone of the first school built on the Bishop's University site was laid by the last office holder of the Commander-in-Chief, North America General Sir Fenwick Williams, of Kars, who took a great interest in the Institution and who was a personal friend of Captain Rawson, an BCS alumni who later taken place in the Anglo-Egyptian War. The new school was a handsome Gothic building, surmounted by a tower—a wing being added to it in 1864.

Notably in the Classical School Era, Sir James David Edgar (10 August 1841 – 31 July 1899), later the 7th Speaker of the House of Commons of Canada, was educated at the School, where his father James Edgar of a Peerage of Scotland decent was appointed the Second Master by the Rev. Lucius Doolittle.

The Classical School was also being investigated by John Lambton, 1st Earl of Durham (Lord Durham) and his chief secretary The Right Honourable Charles Buller during their famous survey tour of the two Canadas that leads to the famous Durham Report. Buller commented the education in Lower Canada and BCS as that:

(Education in Lower Canada) is a combination of imperfection and vices where masters are illiterate and needy, the schoolhouses unfit for occupation and ill-supplied with fuel, the children unprovided with books... the only schools worthy of the bame in the Eastern Townships were kept by the clergy who took a few scholars for private tuition (BCS)

— Preliminary Report of the Assistant, Charles Buller

=== At Little Forks, in Bishop's University ===
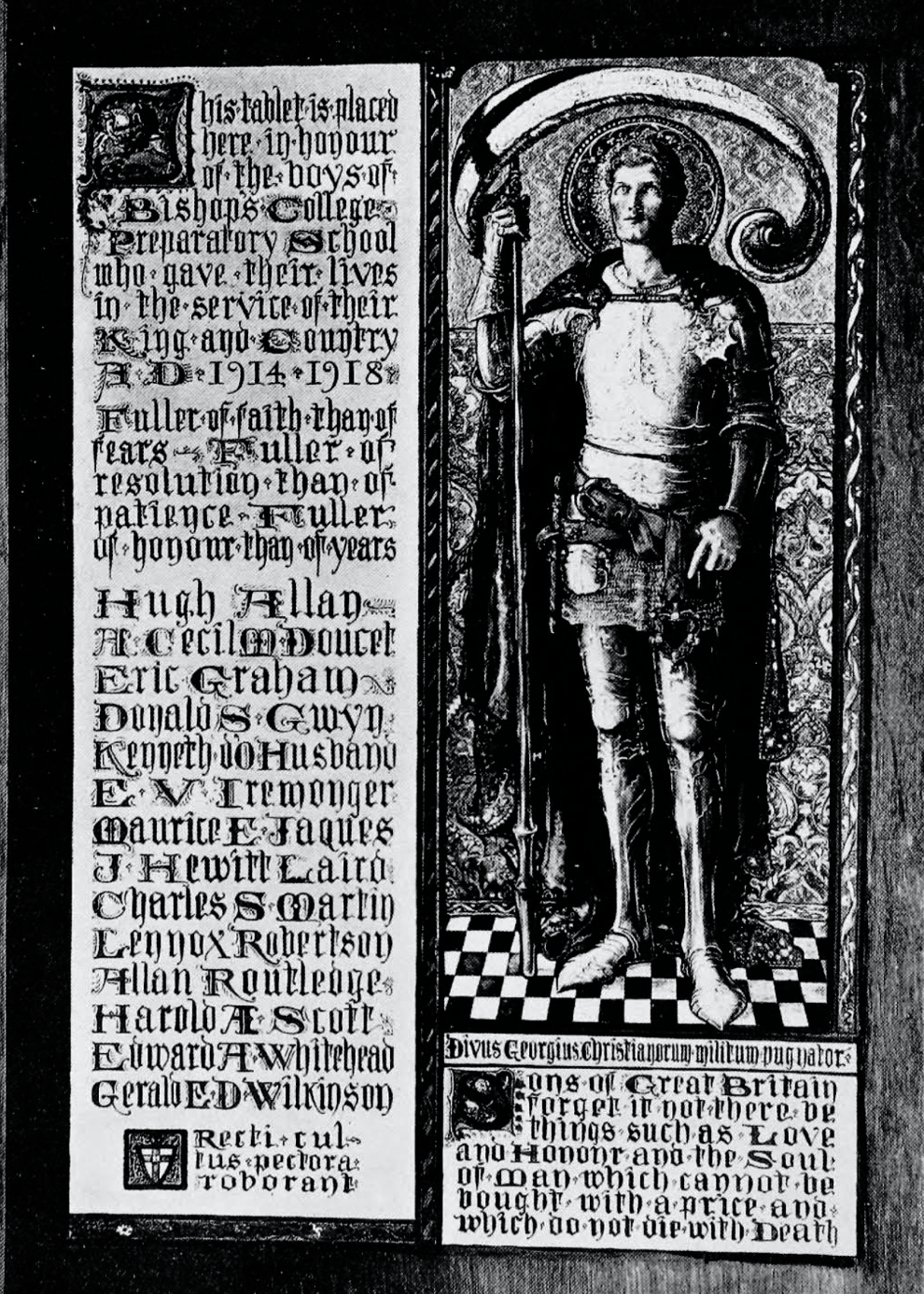
BCS War Memorial Plaque

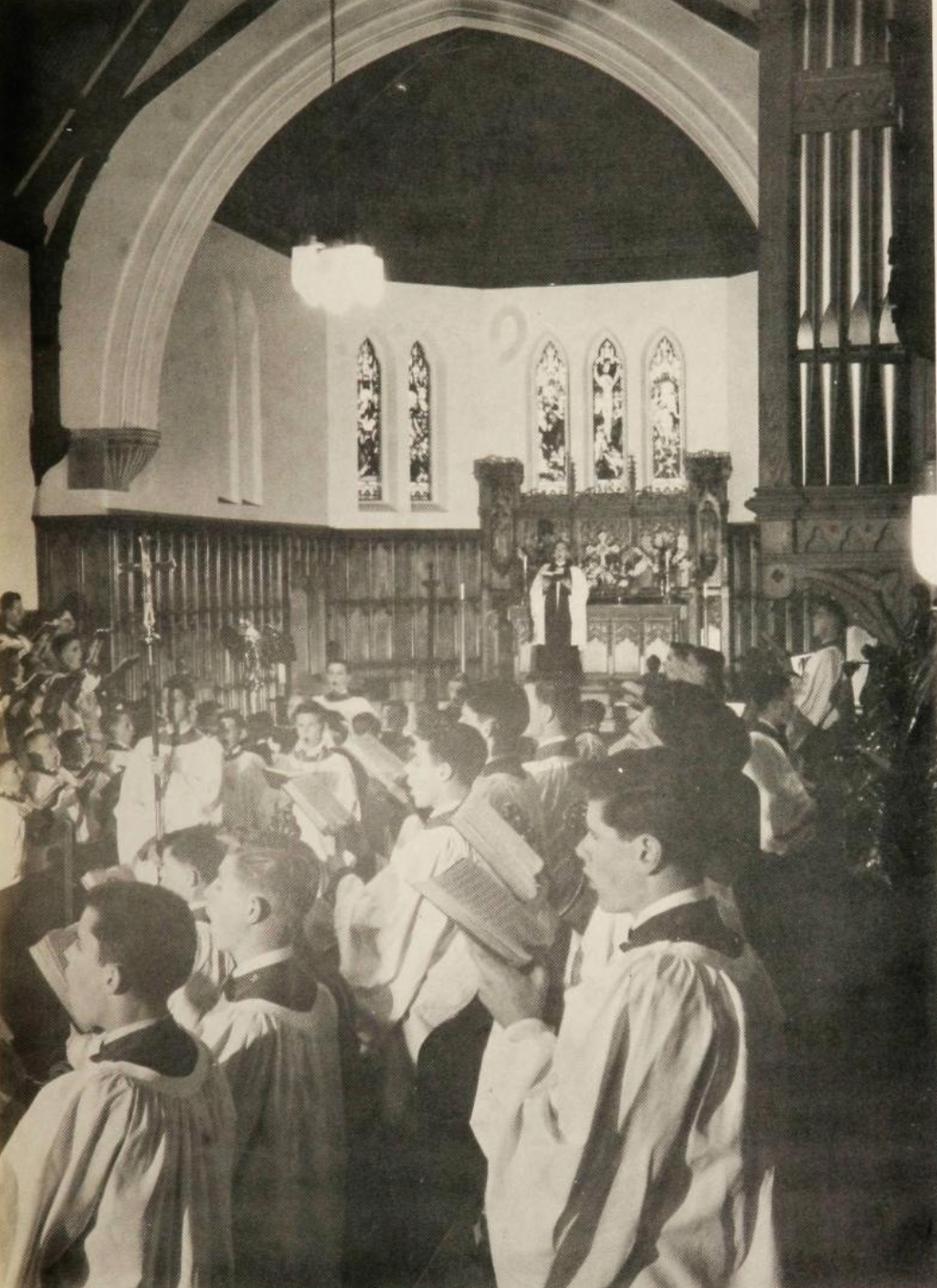
BCS Choir in Bishop's College Chapel 1889

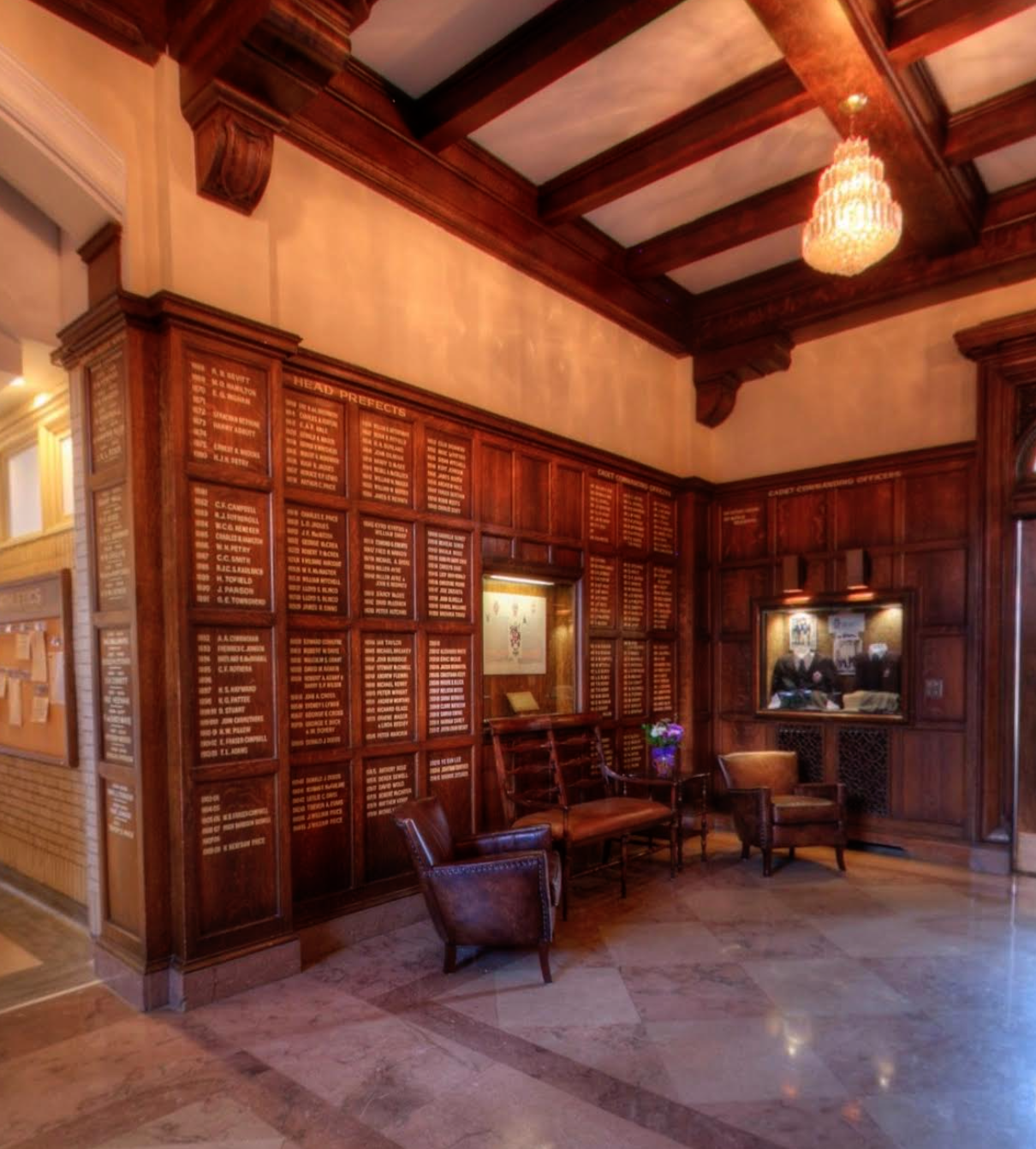
BCS Ross School House Entrance

"Bishop" in the school name today comes from the Lord Bishop of Québec and Montréal, The Right Reverend Dr. George Mountain (DCL, Oxford) who was also the first Principal of McGill College from 1824 to 1835 and the founder of Bishop's University. In 1843, the Lennoxville Classical School became Bishop's College School, under the direction of Edward Chapman (Headmaster 1842), the Bishop Mountain and the principal of BU, Jasper Hume Nicolls (a fellow of The Queen's College, Oxford). The original Prospectus referenced the foundation of the college, with clause five granting BCS the affiliation with BU:

A Grammar School (or Junior Department) to be attached to the college, with one or more masters as may be required, who shall receive their appointments in like manner (i.e., to the Principal, and Professors)—The School to comprehend a special provision for the education of youths designed for business, or commercial pursuits.

— (1845)

James Williams (bishop) (1825–1892) graduated from Pembroke College, Oxford in 1851 was appointed Headmaster of the grammar school in 1857. The Bishops William Hall at the Little Forks Campus is donated completely by BCS alumni to honor their headmaster, yet after the transfer of the school across the river, the building became the property of Bishop's University.

Bishop's College applied to Queen Victoria for a royal charter and received it in 1853 highlights providing education for young people in Lower Canada when BCS was a constituent part of the Bishop's College, and where then Bishop's University today was the University of Bishop's College. There was no gymnasium in those days, but the boys had bars, swings, etc., in one corner of the play-ground. From 1860 onwards, the surroundings of the school began to develop substantially. The Canadian Pacific Railway (CPR) located a station in Lennoxville. It would now take only 4 hours to Ottawa, 6 hours to Toronto and 8 hours to New York City from BCS by train. The student body began to grow more diverse. In 1864, the first governor general of Canada (Then as the governors-general of the two Canadas) after the Canadian Confederation, Lord Monck visited BCS with Lady Monck, a quote was left:

The boys are more like English boys than any I have seen out here, and pride themselves on their English cheer. They seem to have the same love, and respect for their college as Eton boys have for Eton.......... Lennoxville is the Eton of Canada, and it is a charming and civilized place; the boys seem very gentlemanly, and well looked after.

— Page 44~50, My Canadian Leaves: An Account of a Visit to Canada in 1864–1865 by Frances Elizabeth Owen Monck

BCS Cadet Corps #2, the oldest continuous service corps in Canada, was formed in 1861 as the Volunteer Rifle Company in the Fenian Raids and the for facing the threats of the North from the American Civil War by the BCS Rector/BU Principal Rev. Dr. Thomas Adams (Oxford). Beating the oldest regular force military unit in Canada, The Royal Canadian Regiment for 22 years. In 1879, the first Prime Minister of Canada Sir John A. Macdonald granted the Rifle Company the number "No.2" in its name in the newly authorized Drill Associations in the dominion schools and permitted a grant of the rifles.

During the American Civil War, the president of the Confederate States of America, Jefferson Davis sent his two sons Williams and Jefferson Jr. to BCS and her daughter at Couvent du Sacré-Coeur, he eventually lived on BCS campus and Lennoxville with his wife.

In October 1879, BCS obtained financial independence from the Bishop's University and established the Bishop's College School Acossiation under a capital stock of five hundred dollars registered under the company act of Québec, through an act passed in the Legislative Assembly of Quebec forming a corporation that forms by the Lord Bishop of Quebec and 11 other members. The school also used historically the Latin name of "Episcopi Collegium de Lennoxville" The Mayor of Sherbrooke and the influential leader in the Eastern Townships Richard William Heneker acted as the first chair of the BCS Board. His son General Sir William Heneker KCB, KCMG, DSO subsequently attended BCS.

=== Independence of the BCS Association ===
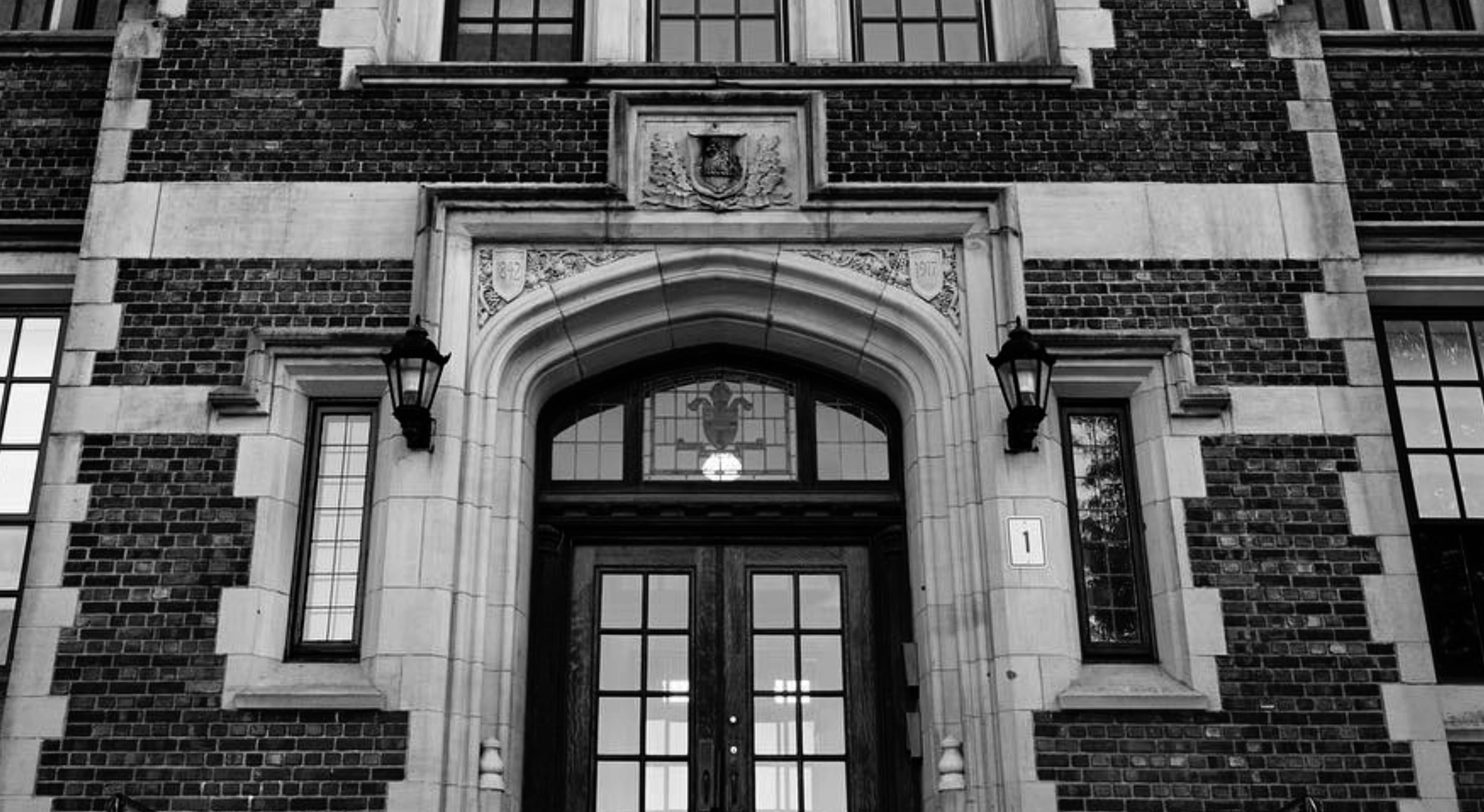
BCS School House

In 1865, some faculty of BCS including the Rev. Charles H. Badgley was summoned by the Anglican Church to establish a preparatory institute in Ontario for Trinity College, this school eventually become Trinity College School and Badgley acted as the first headmaster.

In 1874, BCS sister school King's Hall, Compton was founded by BCS Rector Bishop James Williams as Compton Ladies College who acted as the chairman.

In 1868, the first BCS band was formed as the Rifle Corps. In 1875, the first vocal music instruction at BCS begun with St. J. Brennan appeared as the first Music master.

In 1880, the school was temporarily closed due to the spread of typhoid fever. The same year, The inventor of Am Radio, Reginald Fessenden at the age of fourteen was granted a mathematics mastership and a full scholarship at University Bishop's College. He taught to the younger students (some older than himself) at the School, while simultaneously studying with older students at the college. At the age of 18, he left the school for Edison.

In 1888, a young Oxford graduate George Wollcombe, BA, started his career at Bishop's College School and Bishop's University when he was invited by the BCS Rector/BU Principal Rev. Dr. Thomas Adams (Oxford). In 1891, he was recommended by the head of Bishop's, and some Ottawa-based parents of his BCS students to start a school there. The Ottawa BCS-styled school eventually became Ashbury College today where he served as the headmaster for 42 years from 1891 to 1933. He still found time regularly to make the four-hour train journey to Lennoxville to teach his classes. He obtained an ad eundem Master of Arts from Bishop's University in 1906 without actually enrolled as a student by the arrangements of Bishop's with Oxford. Rhode Scholar Dr. C.L. Odgen Glass also graduated from BCS and BU in 1935 and served in Ashbury as the fourth Headmaster, but later returned to BCS. The BCS-Ashbury Cup, the Oxford University, and Bishop's University arms presented on the stained glass in Ashbury Memorial Chapel are signs of the traditional friendship between these institutions. There is also a record of the BCS-Ashbury Cup winners in the BCS Ross Hall (Dining Hall). Wollcombe also eventually became the headmaster of BCS later.

In 1891, there was a major fire in BCS buildings on the Bishop's University campus, architect Alfred Arthur Cox (architect) designed several buildings on campus including Dining Halls (1899), Kitchen (1899), addition to the Library (1899), new lecture rooms (1899).

BCS moved to its new campus today on Moulton Hill across the river in 1922 as BU refused to sell the land. The inauguration of the new campus was held in 1918 by the Canadian governor-general the Duke of Devonshire, The Hon. William Kenyon-Slaney, General J. K. L. Ross and others who are astounding in the imperial affairs. The BCS choir, founded in 1878, was once considered as the best boys' choir in Canada. The original BCS campus remains today as the building of the science labs, New Arts, at Bishop's University.

=== On Moulton Hill: The era of the Great Wars ===
Bishop's prepared its students by then to pass the difficult McGill University matriculation examinations. Graduates gained admission to Oxford University and Cambridge University. A large range of students such as Norman Webster, David Wanklyn, P.T. Molson, the prior headmaster Odgen Glass, obtained the Rhodes Scholarship.

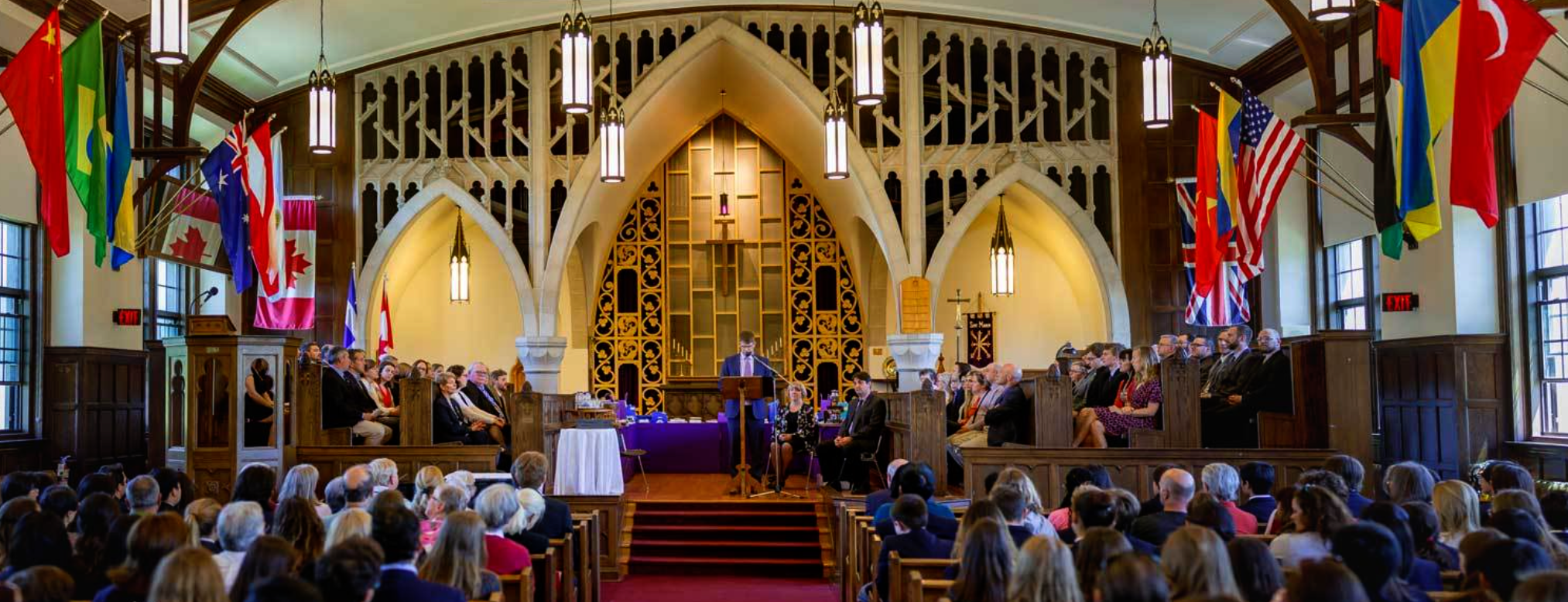
BCS St. Martin's Chapel Assembly

BCS Cadet Corps #2 is the oldest continuous service corps. It was formed in 1861 as the Volunteer Rifle Company. In May 1989, the school's annual cadet inspection was inspected by The Duke of Edinburgh with a crowd of two thousand people.

In 1901, Albert Grey, 4th Earl Grey visited Bishop's University and BCS for a speech to promote the loyalty to the empire. The Royal Military College in Ottawa often posted advertisements in the BCS Magazine during this period. Of the Lennoxville boys who attended the Royal Military College, no less than fifty percent won commissions. Alumni Andrew McNaughton was the Minister of National Defence of Canada by then and the radio inventions of Reginald Fessenden permitted the information transmission on battlefields.

There were over 800 BCS alumni and teachers who participated in World War I and World War II and a large percentage of students who served lost their lives. A stained glass window and War memorial plaques were erected as lists of honors for the Old Boys.

In 1901, the cadet corps took part in the Guard of Honour during the visit of Duke (later King George V) and Duchess of York to Sherbrooke. The Cader Corps was also inspected by the Duke of Devonshire, King Edward VIII in 1919, King George VI in 1939 and Queen Elizabeth The Queen Mother in 1962. In May 1989, the school's annual cadet inspection was inspected by The Duke of Edinburgh with a crowd of two thousand people. The Duke also granted the school's new coats of arms registered under the Royal Heraldry Society of Canada.

Alumnus Sir William Price (1867–1924) was one of the organizers of Valcartier Military Camp (now CFB Valcartier) where BCS students start their year with Cadet Orientation Camp.

Moulton Hill was completely filled with grass and bushes when BCS first moved to this campus from across the river. Many of the trees and plants on campus today were personally planted in 1917 by Headmaster S.P. Smith, a graduate of St. John's College, Oxford (1920–1931), which the Smith residence took his name. This act has completely changed the landscape of Moulton Hill and provides future generation of students with access to forests, distinct eco-systems for science classes, skiing and running trials, camping facilities, etc.

=== Canadian/Québécois statehood with BCS ===
BCS is known to support Canada and Canadian nationalism, and prior to that showing firm loyalty to Britain despite its siting in Québec, where French language identity, and for a time even separatism, is evident. The Rector of BCS during the Canadian Confederation, the Rev. Henry Hopper Miles (LLD, McGill) was the representative of the Eastern Townships in the London Conference of 1866. The school also received the first-ever Canadian flag in a blessing ceremony a few hours before it was raised on Parliament Hill in 1965. The flag was subsequently donated by BCS alumni, a World War II veteran Okill Stuart, who coincidentally invited Prince Philip for an inspection visit to BCS. That particular flag is permanently kept in the BCS Chapel.

In 1989, HRH the Duke of Edinburgh Prince Philip visited the school and inspected the annual cadet inspection. More than 2000 people was attended. The Duke made a speech in the school chapel and unveiled a plaque for the United Empire Loyalists recognizing the school's past 150 years of history. The Coat of Arms and royal charter after the merger with King's Hall was also presented. The United Empire Loyalists anthem was sung for the first time in presence of Prince Philip.

Also in 1989, the author of the Universal Declaration of Human Rights, John Peters Humphrey conveyed an intensive speech in a BCS Politics Class based on the recent events such as the Meech Lake Accords and the Canadian Charter of Rights and Freedoms and his own opinion on Quebec Nationalism & Canadian Nationalism for the first time. He deliberately emphasized individual human rights over that of the collective group. He surprised his audience ending with an almost urgent tone advising the students at BCS to think critically and continue his legacies.

=== The modernization of the school ===
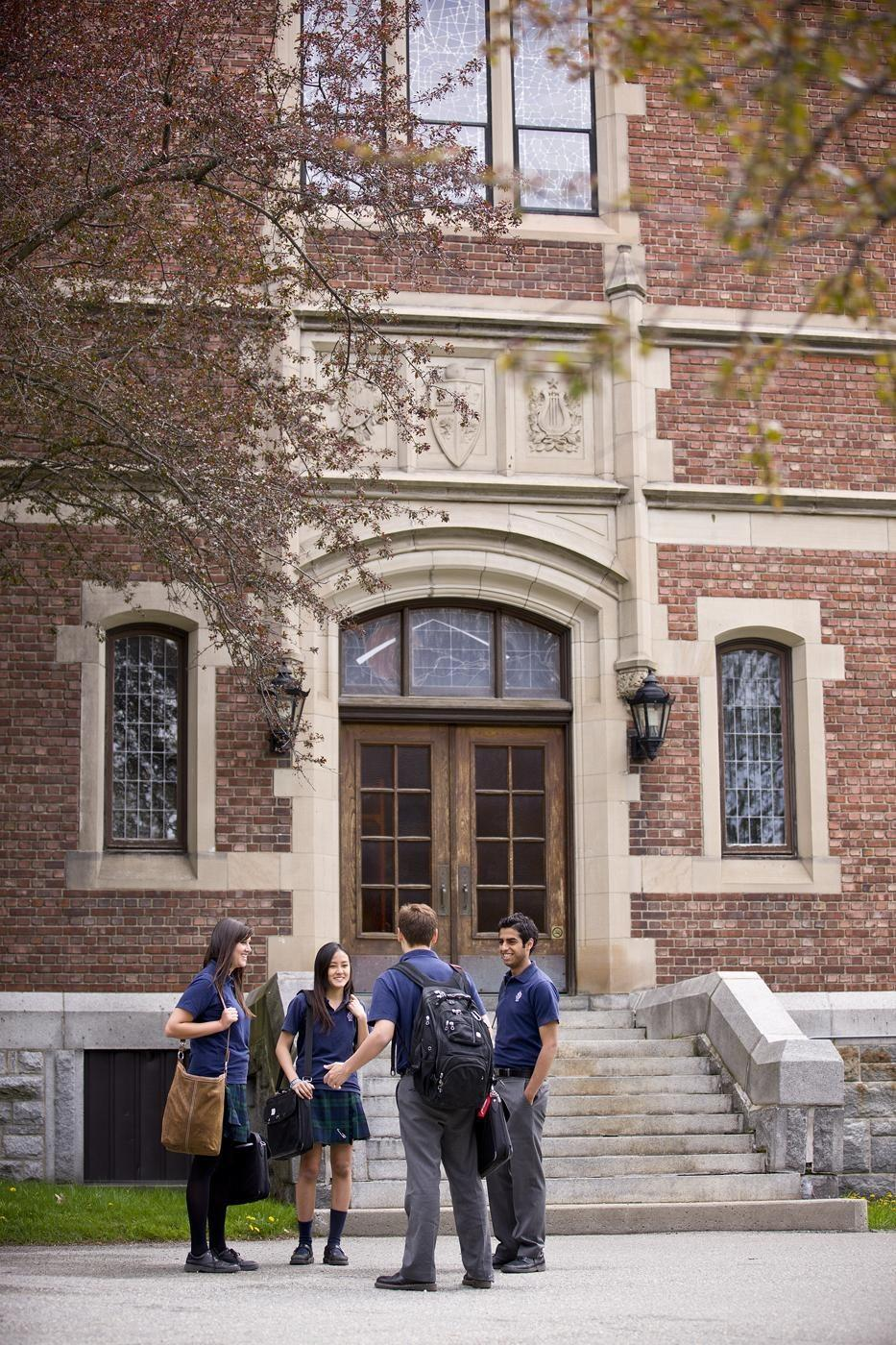
Bishop's College School

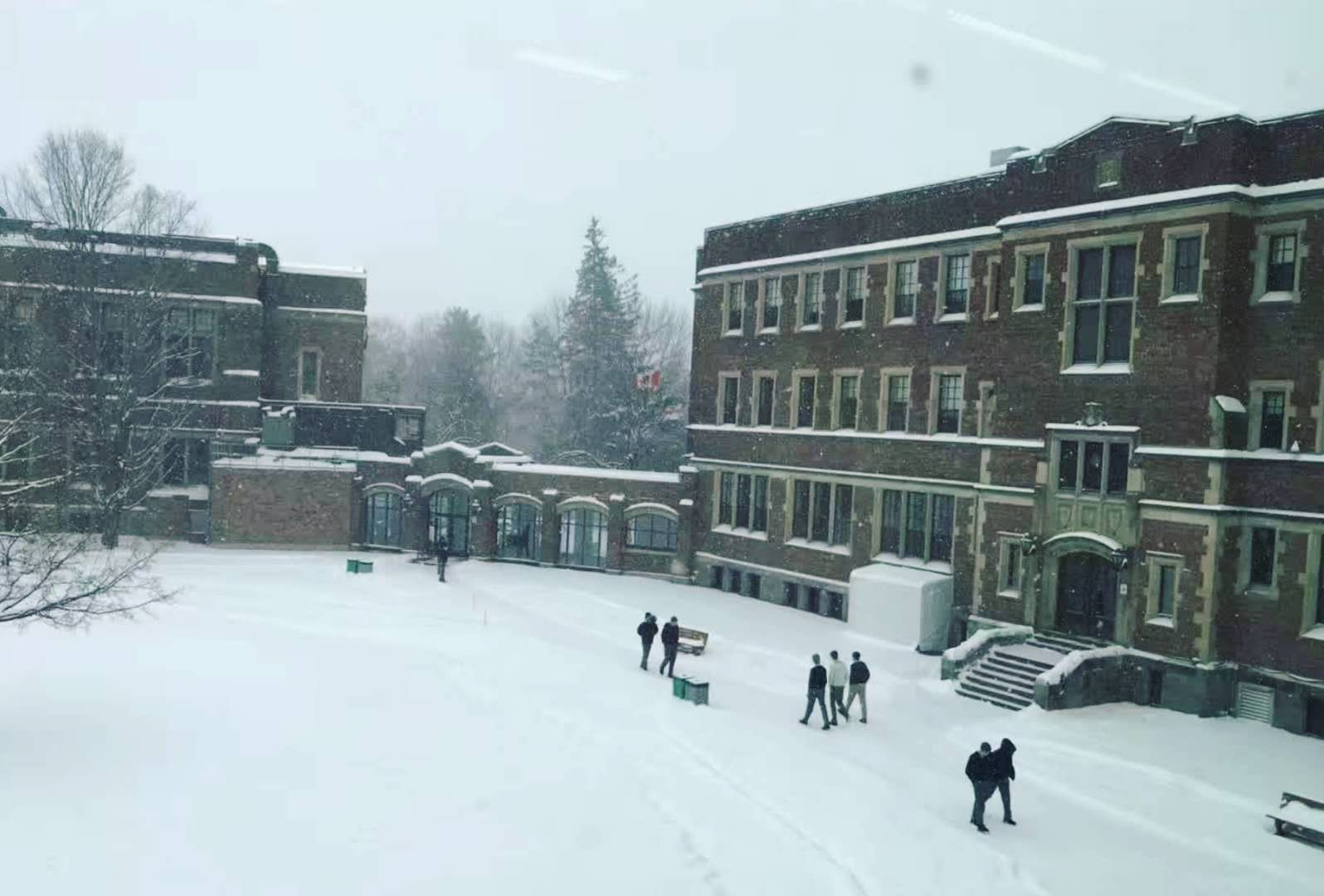
Snow day in BCS squad

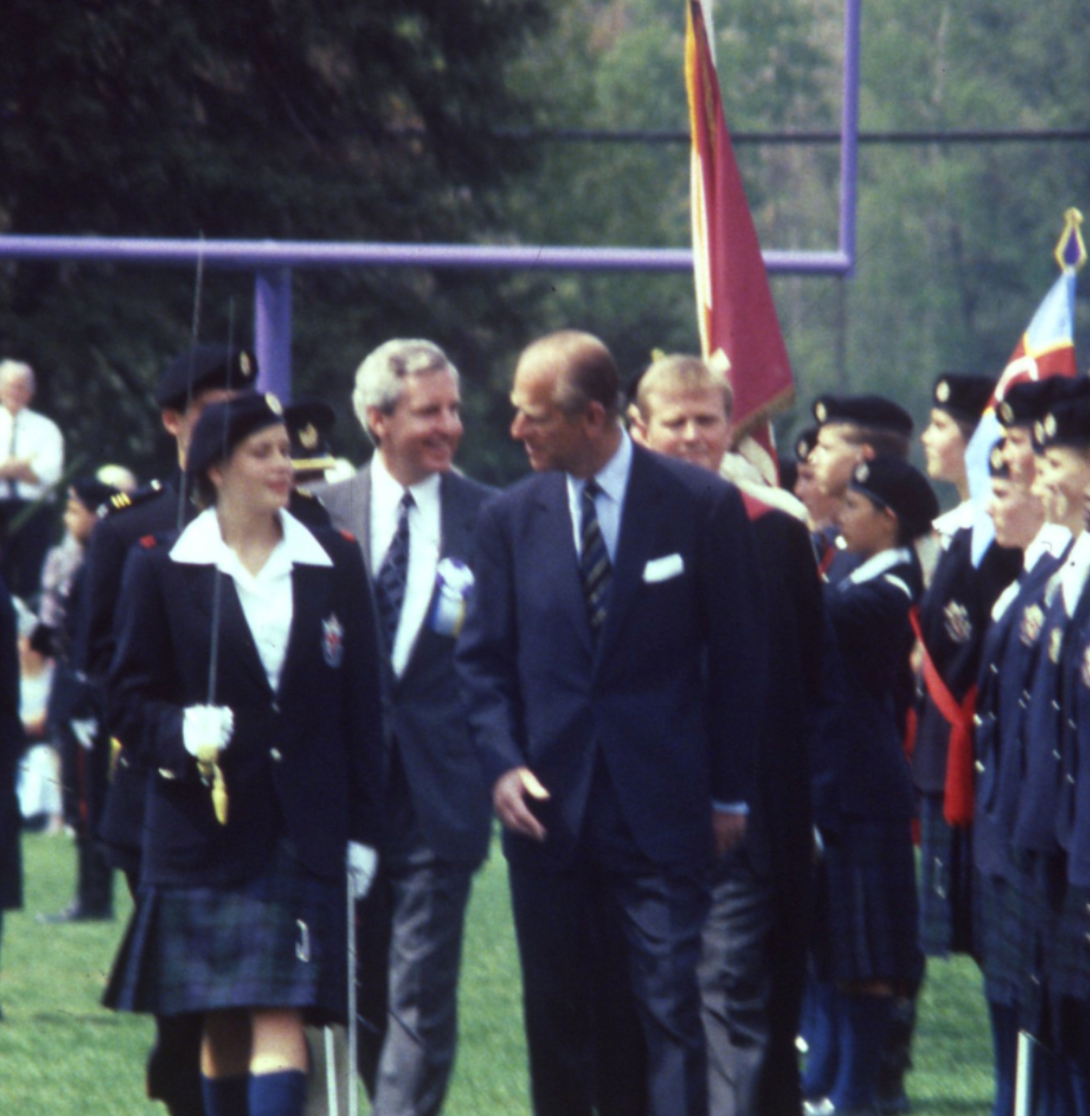
Prince Philip's visit in 1989

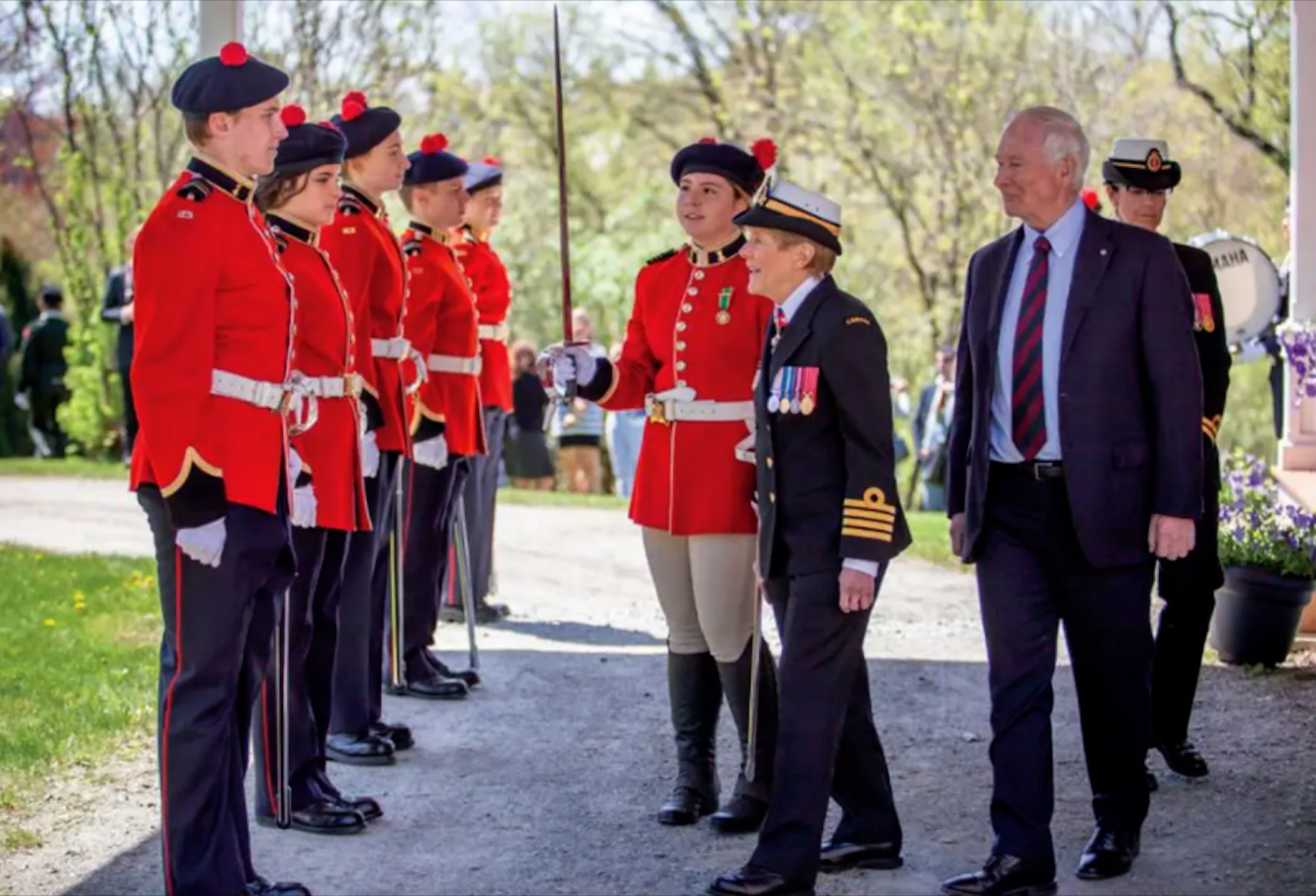
Canadian governor-general David Johnston and Her Excellency Sharon Johnston at BCS 156th Annual Inspection, 2018

In 1935, the Player's Club at BCS was formally founded which continues today. In 1936, the Frank W. Ross Infirmary is built corresponding with the growing health needs of the student body, the infirmary is enlarged in 2020 by alumni donations. Vere Ponsonby, 9th Earl of Bessborough visited BCS in June, 1932 and acted as the visitor of the year.

In 1941, The headmaster the Rt. Rev. Edward Bidwell left to become the Assistant Bishop of Canterbury and the Bishop of Ontario. In 1955, the 18th Governor General of Canada the Rt. Hon. Vincent Massey inspected the BCS cadet corps. In 1958 the school gym/ballroom was consecrated as St. Martin's Chapel by order of the Lord Bishop of Québec, The Rt. Reverend Philip Carrington and BCS students no longer used the chapel at Bishop's University. An organ was installed behind the Cross in 1958. A stained glass window was given to BCS during the closing ceremony of St. Helen's School, Dunham, Québec. It is now installed at the top of the staircase to the chapel. BCS has grown more secular entering into the 21st century.

In 1967, the BCS Foundation was incorporated, soon to open a second branch in the United States.

In 1972, its sister school King's Hall, Compton was amalgamated with BCS under the direction of both school's boards as well as the Québec government under the Company Acts of Québec. Consequently, BCS became one of the first co-ed boarding schools in Canada.

Québec's CÉGEP system was developed in 1976, banning the High School graduates from entering into universities directly. BCS is one of only seven high schools in Québec that offering Grade 12 as an alternative to this system and one of the few English university-preparatory schools that does not need a certificate of eligibility following the language law Bill 101.

Since 1980, when Terry Fox ran his Marathon of Hope, BCS has participated annually in the Terry Fox Run. Today, this fundraising event remains mandatory for all students. BCS also participates enthusiastically in Orange Shirt Day to raise awareness of abuse in the Canadian Indian residential school system. In 1981, Few other prominent Canadian independent schools and BCS came together to form an alliance as a national network for member schools supporting collaborative initiatives in leadership, education, management and governance. The organization continues today as the Canadian Accredited Independent Schools (CAIS+).

Sunday Services at BCS ended in the 2000s. BCS no longer has full-time chaplain but the Festival of Nine Lessons and Carols, the Remembrance Day Service, daily Chapel Assembly remains and is managed by the Prefect, the student body and the school organist. The school also invites religious figures of various faiths for speeches. The most notable daily religious practice at BCS today is the singing of the Anglican hymns from red or green hymnals. The school hymn is And did those feet in ancient time (Jerusalem) and the song Spirit, Spirit of Gentleness is sung during a BCS spirit day where students wear in purple.

The first BCS summer camp was launched in 1961.

In 2004, the Hartland de Montarville Molson Hall was erected in 2005 donated by the Molson family of Montreal and the BCS/KHC alumni association, where the current library, student center and Doolittle's Cafeteria locates. The dedication was done by his grandson and a former director of the Molson Foundation, The Hon. Maximilian E. Hardinge.

In 2017, the Canadian Minister of National Defence The Hon. Harjit Sajjan and The Minister of Agriculture and Agri-Food The Hon. Marie-Claude Bibeau (MP for Sherbrooke) visited BCS and hosted a town hall in the School Chapel, acted as the visitor of the year.

In 2018, the cadet corps was inspected by the fourteenth principal and vice-chancellor of McGill University, past BCS parent the Canadian governor-general The Rt. Hon. David Johnston and the Canadian Cadet Service Medal was introduced to the school. Her Excellency Sharon Johnston has helped voluntarily in the board of BCS His five daughters attended BCS while Alexandra Johnston, vice-president of the Canadian Broadcasting Corporation is a current member of the BCS board.

In 2020, the first residence to be built in fifty years, Mitchell Family House, obtained the Prix d'excellence en architecture by Ordre des architectes du Québec in 2020. As Bishop's University changed its name in the 1950s, from then on, the name "Bishop's College" is generally referred to as BCS in Canadian Media.

In 2021, BCS opening ceremonies was addressed by Canadian Senator The Hon. Chantal Petitclerc.

Today, BCS serves approximately 240 students with over 40 faculty. The campus consists of 26 buildings set on 270 acres (1.1 km^{2}), including playing fields and woodlands. There are students from Canada, Vietnam, China, Korea, USA, England, France, Mexico, South America, Bahamas, Bermuda, Germany, Japan and Thailand among these over 40 countries

== King's Hall in Compton (KHC) ==
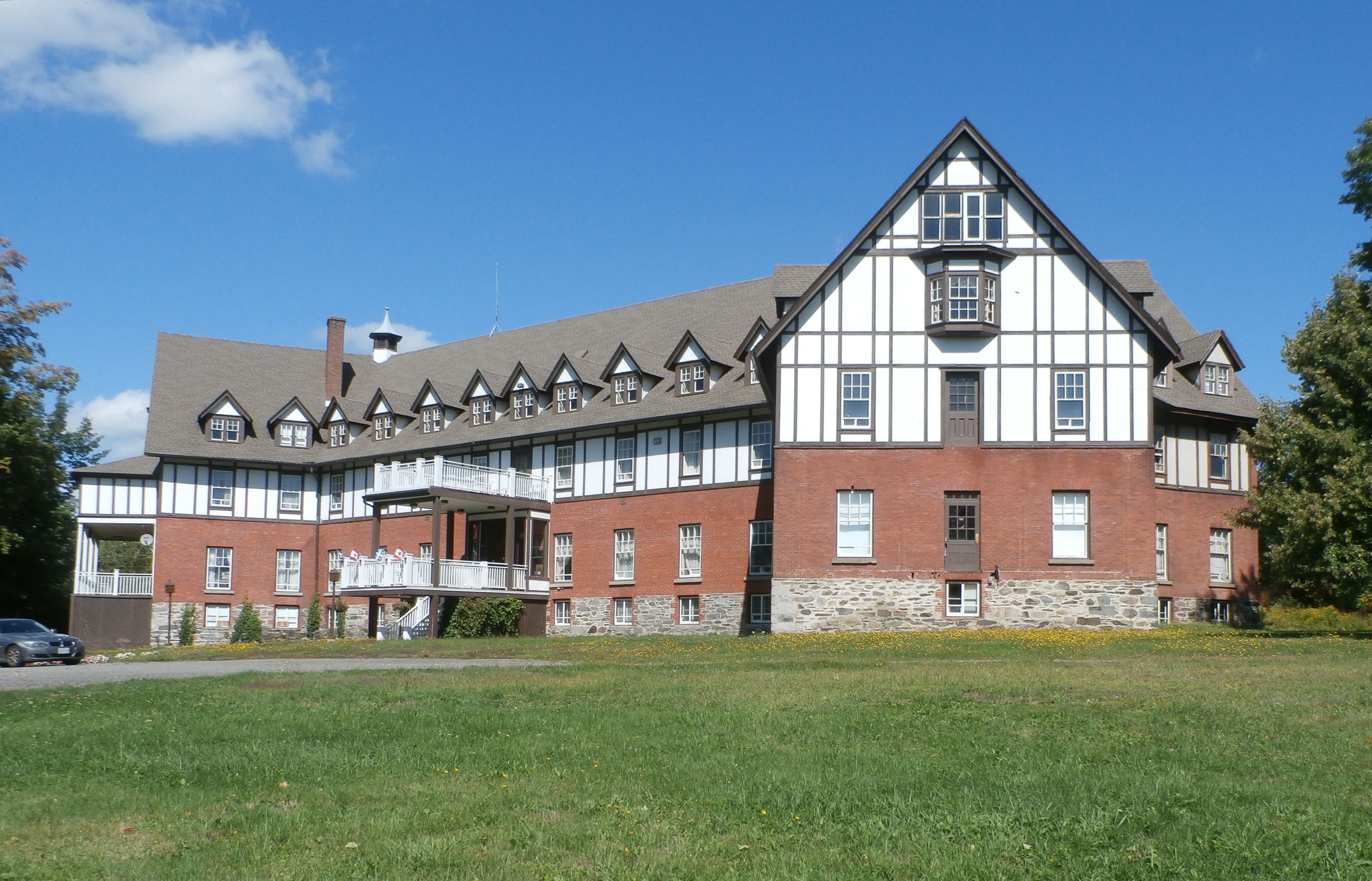
King'Hall Campus prior to Merge

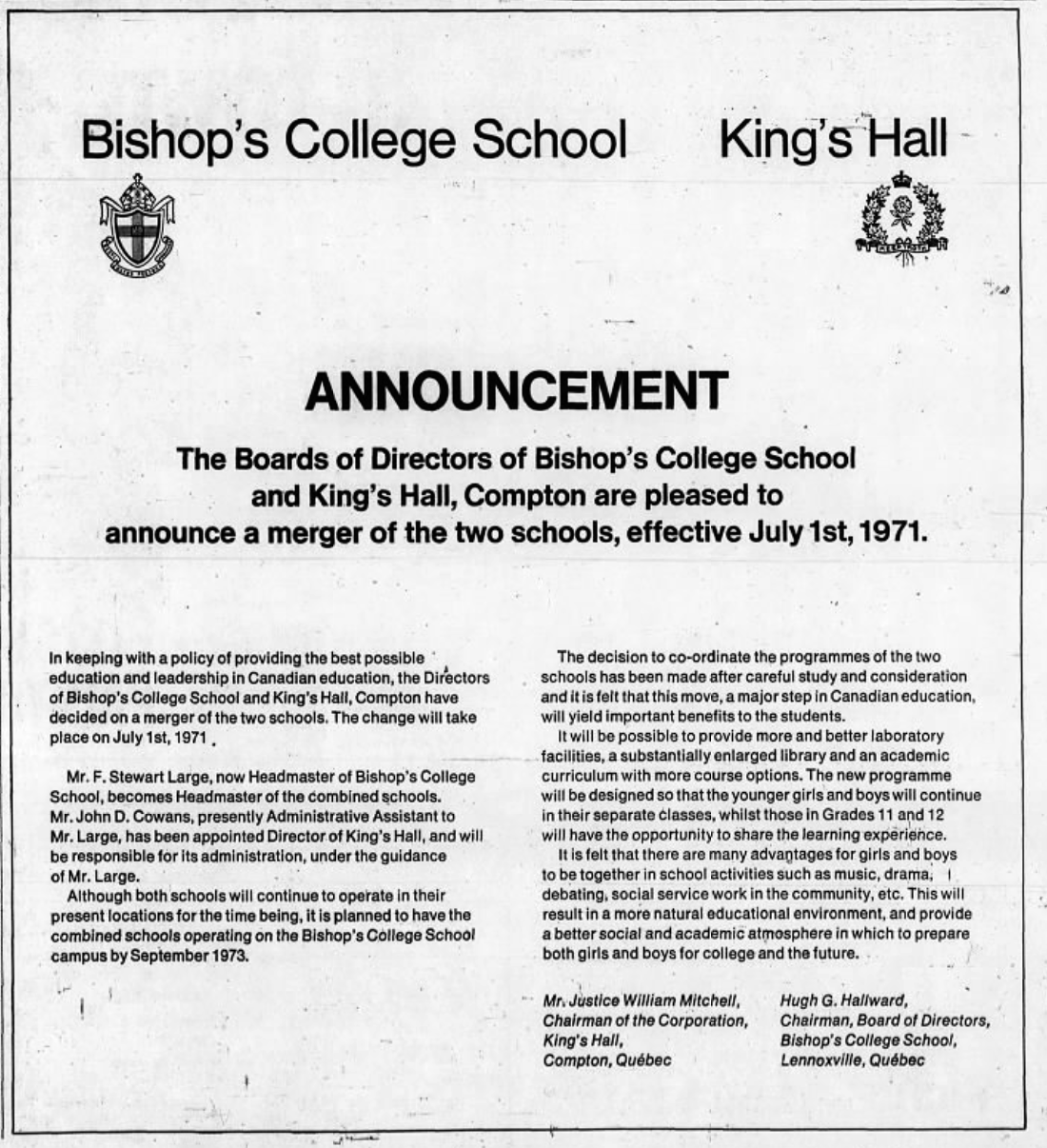
BCS/KHC Merge Announcements by the Boards 1971

King's Hall in Compton was a girl's boarding school founded by the Anglican Diocese of Quebec in 1874 as the Compton Ladies College. It was founded by BCS Rector James Williams (bishop) who acted as the chairman. The institution was founded for a female education in the rural parts of the Anglican Diocese of Quebec and as a sister school to Bishop's College School which locates 30 mins apart. The school location was finally decided to be Compton, Quebec. The school changed its name to "King's" in memory of the coronation of King Edward VII. The Board of King's Hall was consisted of the Bishop of Quebec and 12 other members. The boarding school neglects to honor Daylight saving time.

In the 1972–73 school year, girls joined school life when BCS and King's Hall, located 20 minutes apart, amalgamated. The original junior school, Bishop's Preparatory School, or Prep was changed into Glass House, and the KHC Gillard House was re-built on BCS campus to accommodate the female students. (Gillard House was named after Dr. A. E. Gillard. She was Headmistress at KHC from 1930 to 1968) The white rose in the school logo, coats of arms demonstrate recognition of KHC. The glass passage connecting two school buildings was built in honour of King's Hall. Many of the traditions of King's Hall have been absorbed by BCS, and the KHC Old Girls joined the BCS alumnus association. Some of the girls' residences such as Glass and Gillard adopted the KHC coats of arms as their logo.

=== Former KHC campus in Compton ===
The King's Hall campus in Compton, Quebec was sold to a hotel group when the girls who had been students there were moved to the BCS campus in 1972. In 2018, due to financial difficulties, the hotel group sold this property to an unknown Chinese consortium from Toronto which, operating under the name King's Hall, began offering short-term language immersion courses to Chinese secondary students. This new Chinese consortium has no connection whatsoever to the former educational institution, King's Hall, Compton Inc. founded in 1874 nor to Bishop's College School Inc. founded in 1836.

Artifacts preserved from the KHC campus and transferred to BCS include various books, statues, and paintings, as well as chapel pews, six stained glass windows and the bell from St. James the Less Anglican Church in Compton where KHC students attended services.

== Academics ==
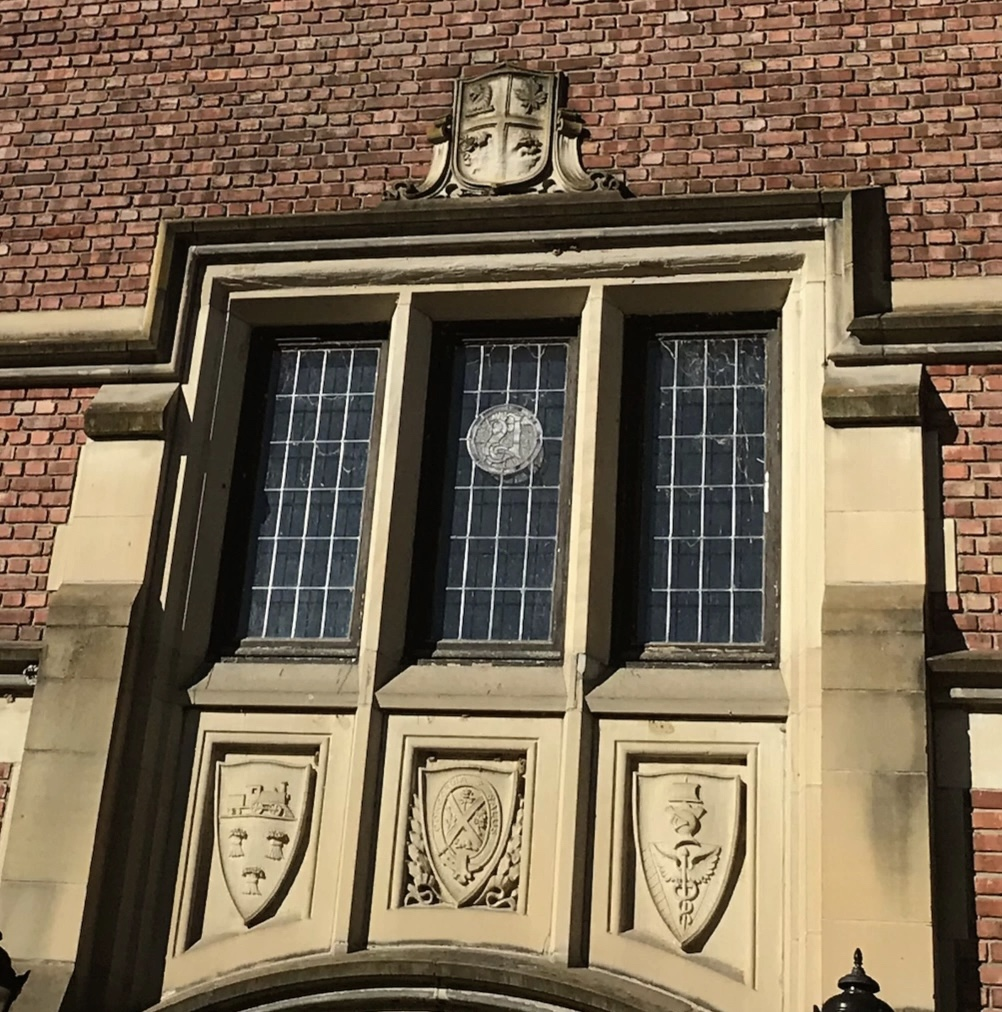
BCS School House Back Entrance

BCS provides the academic program of the provincial curriculum of Québec (Diplôme d' études secondaires) for grade 7~11 and the New Brunswick's Canadian High School Diploma for Grade 11,12 along with optional only International Baccalaureate courses while AP courses and SAT preparation is also available.

The school's senior students may be eligible to take credit courses at Bishop's University for advance standings through the BU Bridge Program. BCS is the only school in Canada providing such programs. The T.H.P. Molson Bilingual Option program at BCS offers the students with an exceptional opportunity to learn a second language and to benefit from the unique cultural richness of Québec and Canada. It is named after BCS alumni, Rhodes Scholar Thomas Henry Pentland Molson who is from the bilingual Molson Family. The RDW. Howson Enrichment Centre provides free tutoring to the students every weeknight from Monday to Thursday.

=== Notes ===
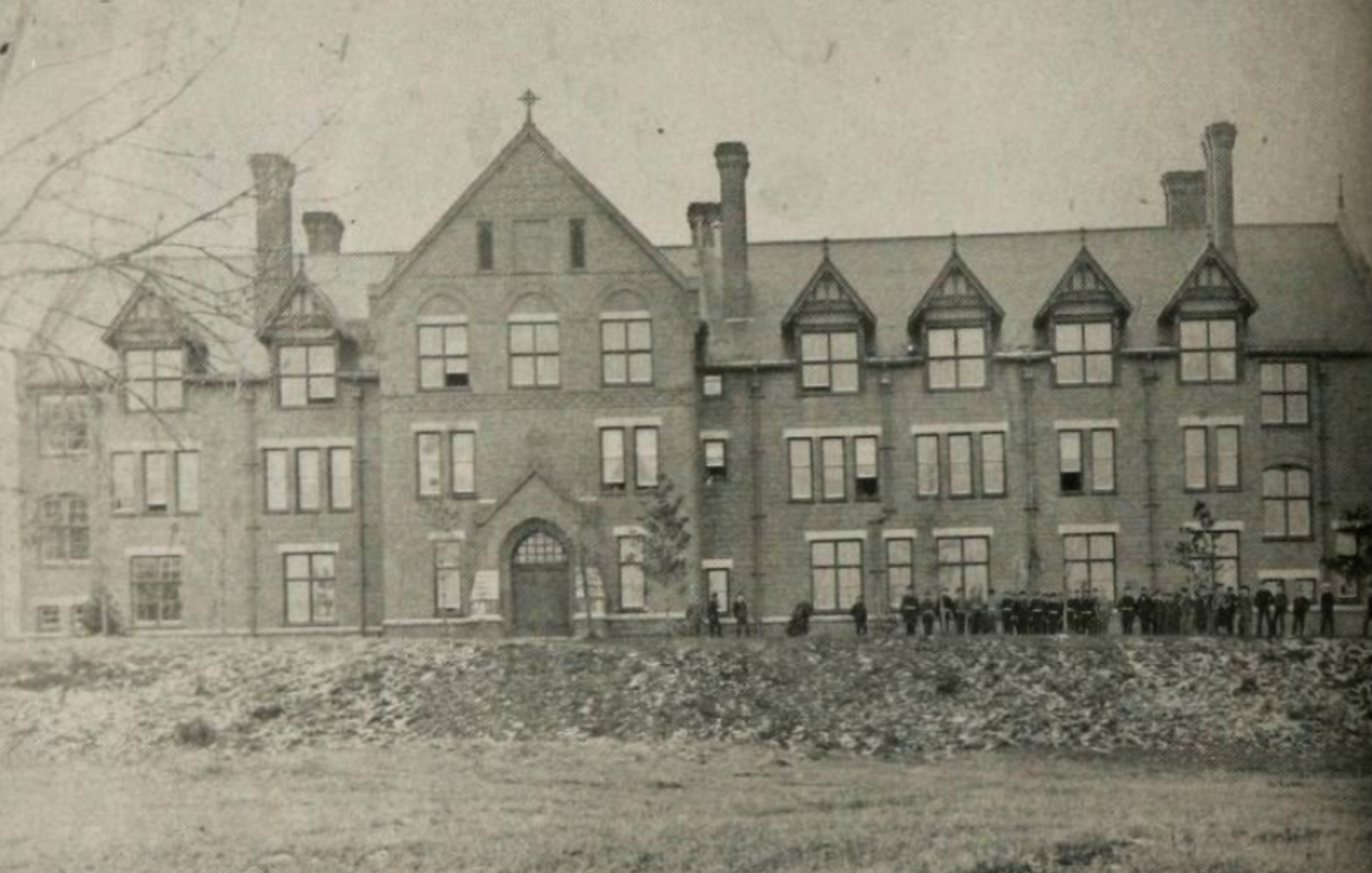
Bishop's as the Grammar School at Little Forks, 1885 in Bishop's University

Grade 11 (Form VI): The award of Québec Diplôme d'études secondaires (DÉS) by the Ministry of Education and Higher Education (Quebec) is subjected to the completion of 54 credits over two years (including 20 in grade 11) and the completion of the ministry examinations on History and Citizenship Education, Mathematics (CST or SN), English Language Arts, Français langue maternelle (native)/seconde, and Sciences (Technologic or Environmental). Otherwise, only the BCS School Certificate would be awarded.

Grade 12 (Form VII): BCS provides a High School Diploma that is accredited by the Canadian province of New Brunswick. This High School Diploma is recognized internationally. Credits in this program are granted by the Department of Education in New Brunswick. These credits have authority to count towards the New Brunswick High School Diploma. AP & IB courses is also available but optional. In order to award the New Brunswick High School Diploma, students must earn a total of 17 credits in grades 11 and 12. This unique multi-curriculum program makes BCS one of the seven schools in Quebec neglecting the CÉGEP system for university admittance.

For the BCS School Certificate, the student must complete a minimum of the Bronze level of the Duke of Edinburgh Award, complete a community service requirement, and participate in the BCS Cadet program.

=== Admission, scholarship and exchange program ===
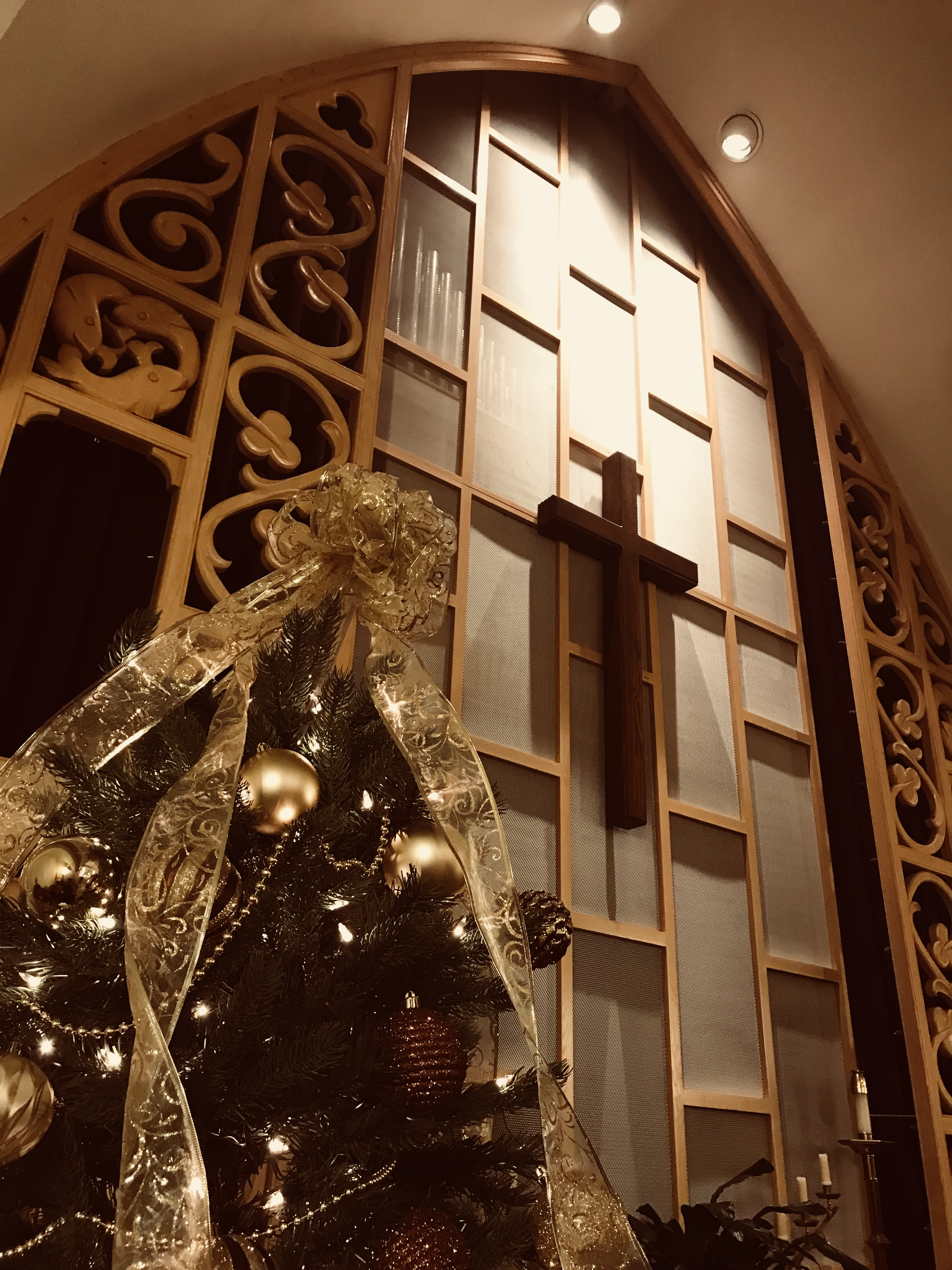
BCS St. Martin's Chapel Organ

Most students are accepted into the junior school division, Form II ~ IV (Grade 7~9). Bishop's selective admissions process has approximately 60 spots per year for new boarding students and 10 for day students. Students are selected with a committee of 10 staffs through a rigorous admissions process which includes online registration, review of the transcripts & recommendations, two entrance exams and an interview in English. One or more science entrance exam may be added in lieu of the stream the student involves. The ESL (English as a second language) exam is an alternative to the normal first language English exams, only available for admission to Form II¬V (Grade 7¬10) and specifically designed for French Canadian and international students, but the student must prescribe to an extra $7,000 ESL+ program for academic English if they have been admitted in this way. The result of SSAT, TOEFL, IELTS, GCSE, etc. can also be used as reference.

There are special schemes for BCS to recruit student athletes and scholars. BCS provides over 40 kinds of scholarship and financial assistance with a value approx. equals to $1.9 million. Usually the last round of waitlist for September entry is ended in March. The students studying in non-Canadian Round Square schools and other allied schools such as the Wellington College, etc. with good academic standings may undertake an exchange program at BCS for a period of 3 months in Form IV or V (Grade 9 or 10), while BCS students can take an exchange program with them too.

For residents of Quebec, BCS does not require a Certificate of Eligibility for instruction in English. When siblings attend BCS throughout the same school year, a discount representing 10% of tuition will be granted for each additional child of the same family. By virtual of an admittance to BCS, the parent must also agree to register their children in the Canadian Department of National Defence as a Cadet Member in light that attending the BCS No.2 Cadet Corp is compulsory for all students.

== BCS Cadet Corps #2 ==
BCS Cadet Corps #2 was formed by the BCS Rector/BU Principal Rev. Dr. Thomas Adams (Oxford), as the Volunteer Rifle Company during the Fenian Raids and the threats from the American Civil War in 1861. It is the oldest continuous service cadet corps in Canada and the only one who received battle colours.

During the 1866 Fenian Raids, the corps was summoned with Upper Canada College Corps to help protect the Canadian border and local bridges which was the only case in Canadian history where corps formed of minors was being sent to battlefields. The Principal, Mr. Irving asked for volunteers and from them, he selected 20 of the strongest. The cadets mounted guard for 11 days before the threat diminished and the guard was dismissed.

In 1879, the first Prime Minister of Canada Sir John A. Macdonald granted the Rifle Company No.2 in the newly authorized Drill Associations in the dominion schools and permitted a grant of the rifles. The Cadets corps raised many renowned military leaders such as General Andrew McNaughton, Commander-in-chief, and Canada's Minister of National Defense during World War II, Brigadier General The Right Honourable Hamilton Gault, who raised the Princess Patricia's Canadian Light Infantry, the last privately raised regiment in the British Empire. Today, the corps plays a major role in the lives of students, schools, and communities.

Bishop's College School is affiliated with the Black Watch Regiment of Montreal and the Royal Canadian Army Cadets. Typically, there are a few officers appointed by the Canadian Army to the school each year as the staff, teacher and cadet supervisor. In early May, the corps sends two platoons and the Colour Party to march with the regiment in their Church Parade on Sherbrooke Street and Saint Catherine Street in Montreal. The Annual Corps review is held on the Friday of May long weekend; this event includes demonstrations by the drill team and the band.

== Duke of Edinburgh's Award (BCS Scheme) ==
Bishop's College School offers all students, beginning in Form IV, the opportunity to earn The Duke of Edinburgh's Award, which is an international program that operates in more than 100 countries. Traditionally at BCS, the Lieutenant Governor of Quebec gives out the Award to its recipients annually in the school chapel.

Introduced to Canada in 1963, the Duke of Edinburgh's Award is open to all young people between the ages of 14 and 25. The Award currently attracts some 30,000 participants annually and is operational in all 10 provinces and 3 territories.

There are three levels to the Award: Bronze, Silver, and Gold – each with an increasing degree of commitment. Within each level, there are four sections. The completion on the bronze level of this Award is one of the school graduation requirements at BCS.

BCS has been a member of the Round Square Conference of Schools since the 1980s.

== Houses ==
BCS adopt the House system since its foundation and consists of 10 family-style houses (8 residences + Day Boys + Day Girls), two of which belong to the day students:

- Glass (Senior Girls, 1971): in the Grant Hall Building. Named after Rhode Scholar C. L. Odgen Glass (former Headmaster, alumni) and the building was previously for the BCS Preparatory Primary School, "Prep".
- Gillard (Senior Girls), 1971 named after King's Hall Headmistress Dr. A. E. Gillard. The House also adopts the Crest of KHC granted by King Edward VIII.
- Grier North (Senior Boys, 1976) & Grier South (Junior Boys, 1976): Named after former Headmaster Colonel C. G. M. Grier, CO of the Royal Canadian Army in 1943.
- Smith (Senior Boys) : Motto: Probitas, Integritas, Autonomia.
- Mitchell (Senior Boys, 2020) : In 2020, Mitchell Family House obtained the Prix d'excellence en architecture by the Ordre des architectes du Québec. It is named after the family of Walter George Mitchell, the 10th Chairman of BCS and last Chairman of KHC, The Hon. Mr. Justice William Mitchell BCS'26 and his son, Dr. William Mitchell, the 31st headmaster of the school.
- Williams (Junior Girls, 1936) : Named after BCS's fifth headmaster, Oxford graduate Reverend James Williams (bishop). Bishop William Hall at the BCS historical Little Forks Campus is also donated completely by BCS alumni to honor their headmaster, yet after the transfer of the school across the river, the building became the property of Bishop's University.
- McNaughton (Senior Boys, 1971) Named after Andrew McNaughton, Minister of National Defence of Canada during World War II. Chair of the United Nations Atomic Energy Commission.
- Ross (Day Students): Named after commander alumni J. K. L. Ross, CBE BCS' 1886 who also donated the J.K.L. Ross House (Ross'House) in McGill University. (Institute and Centre of Air and Space Law)
- Chapman (Closed/pending renovation). Built-in 1878–1880 as the BCS Infirmary. In 1936 on the anniversary the infirmary was converted to the first student residence in honor of Edward Chapman, a professor of history from McGill University and M.A. from the University of Cambridge who succeeded Lucius Doolittle in 1842 to become the second Headmaster of Bishop's College School. Yet, since 2010, due to the remote distance, the house has been converted to a teacher residence.

Williams House has alternated between being a boys' house and a girls' house over the years.

Traditionally, the Houses have had a healthy inter-house rivalry competing against one another in Track and Field, the annual XC running race, for the House Cup in Carnival and other events held annually.

== BCS Multilingual Festival of Nine Lessons and Carols ==
In Canada, the Festival of Nine Lessons and Carols is displayed in a multilingual method at BCS since 1890s where the Nine Lessons are read in nine languages/dialects. As BCS is the oldest Episcopal-background School in Canada, located in a French-speaking province and the school consists of over 40 nationalities. This is the only case in the world where the service is multilingual and was bilingual in English and French when first introduced by its 6th headmaster and Chairman of King's Hall, the Anglican Bishop of Quebec James Williams (bishop), a graduate of Pembroke College, Oxford.

== Controversy ==
In 2007, a class action was launched by several former students who alleged physical, mental, and sexual abuse by masters, head boys, and prefects during the 1950s and 1960s. One of the foremost perpetrators was Harold Forster, a Cambridge-graduated Anglican priest, and the school's chaplain and choir director. He also taught at Eton College. Forty-three known victims came forward before the class action was settled in early 2010 by the school. Reverend Forster was killed in a train accident in England while teaching at Harrow School in the mid-1960s. In 2013, the school owned up to the abuse in a private ceremony on school land.

== Athletics ==
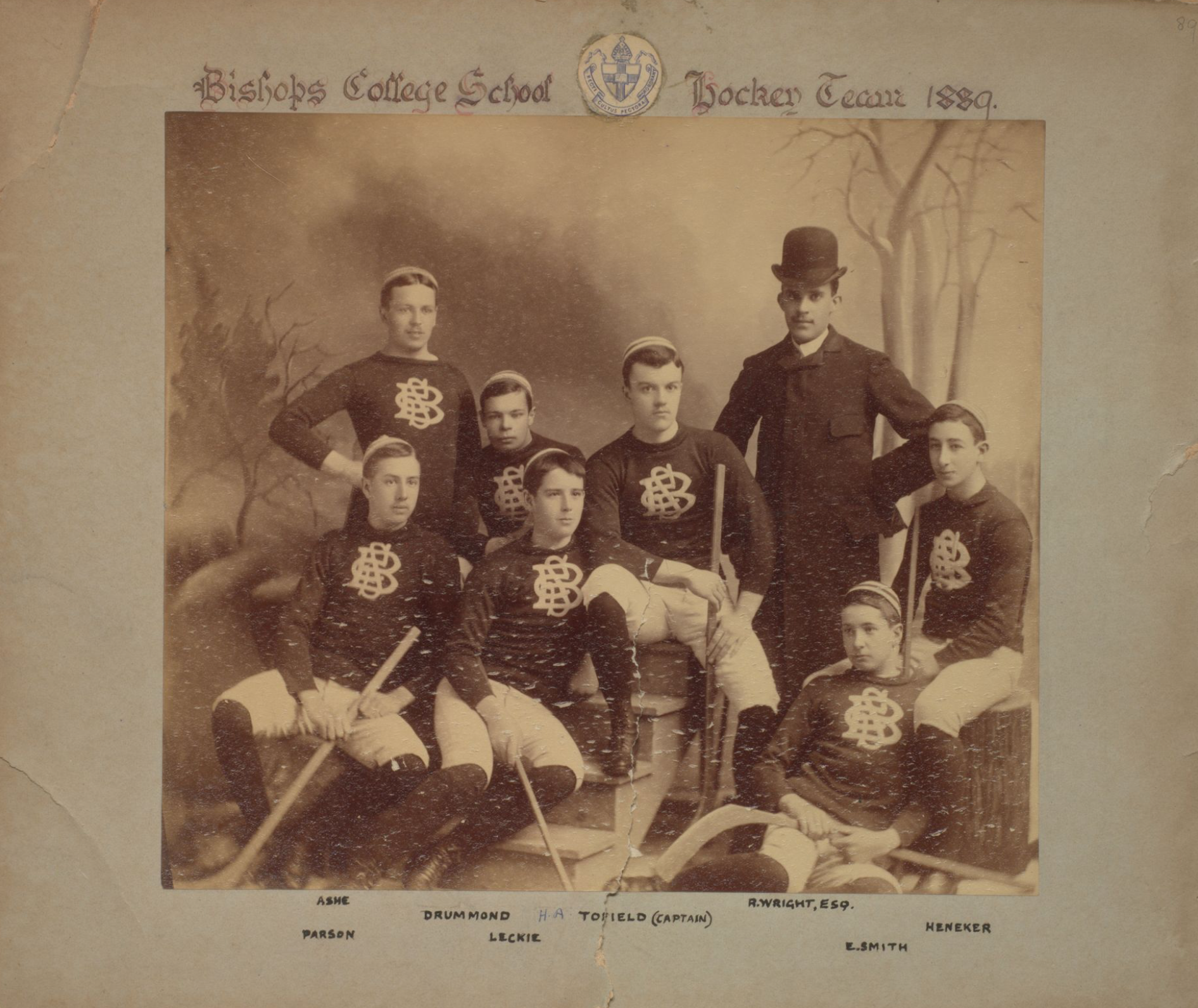
Bishop's College School Hockey Team 1889

At BCS sports are referred to as "creases" since the establishment of the school. The school offers hockey, basketball, squash, lacrosse, volleyball, field hockey, swimming, soccer, cycling, tennis, yoga, golf, adventure training, horseback riding, touch football, and ultimate Frisbee among them 26 sports. Students are required to participate in three creases each year: one in the fall, the winter, and the spring. Girls, boys, and mixed teams compete intramurally as well as inter-scholastically. In recent years, BCS teams have won championships in basketball, football, rugby, soccer, swimming, and tennis. Facilities including a fitness center, double gym, approximately 5 km of outdoor running/Nordic skiing trails, an archery station, a 40-foot (12 m) climbing wall, squash and tennis courts, and an indoor hockey rink. In addition, the School is in proximity to golf courses, curling, cross country and alpine ski centers, the aquatic facilities at Bishop's University as well as extensive public bike paths.

The school's website currently lists 26 creases (sports) to choose from. Recently, creases were expanded to include arts-related pursuits in addition to the traditional athletic program.

The BCS hockey first team was founded as early as the 1880s. The school's memorial arena is the oldest indoor ice rink in Canada. It was established in 1925 with $25,000 donated by alumni, in an area of 175* 75 square feet. The team has various famous alumni such as Noah Dobson, Jere Gillis and Dawson Mercer in the NHL and ones such as Hartland MacDougall (1875–1947), Ernest McLea (1876–1931) in the pre-NHL era. Two of BCS alumni used to own the NHL team Montreal Canadiens: Edward Bronfman, OC & Senator Hartland de Montarville Molson OC, OBE, OQ. Also there are a lot of professional player of other sports root from BCS such as NFL player Sam Giguère & Tom Nütten, Tennis player Robert Bédard, Rower olympian Greg Stevenson, etc.

Currently, Bishop's College School has two elite hockey teams: the U/18 Varsity team and the U/16 Prep team. The U/18 Varsity team plays in a 45–50 game schedule against the top prep schools in North America. A notable full-time member of the Midwest Prep Hockey League (MPHL), the team is an associate member of the New England Preparatory School Athletic Council (NEPSAC) and participates part-time in the Prep School Hockey League (PSHF) of which they hold the 2015–2016 regular season title and 2017 National Independent School Invitational Championship. The U/16 Prep team competes in the Prep School Hockey Federation (PSHF) of which they are the 2015–2016 and 2018–2019 Playoff Champions. The demanding 40+ game schedule requires extensive travel across North America facing off against the top prep and junior schools. All players in the elite hockey program are expected to maintain satisfactory academic standing throughout the year to maximize their academic potential.

In 2008, Stéphan Lebeau was hired by BCS. Lebeau had won a Stanley Cup in 1993 with the Montreal Canadiens. His brother, Patrick, also played a short time in the NHL.

Since 2012–2013, BCS Hockey programme has two teams (U18 and U16) which both play in the Ligue de Hockey Préparatoire Scolaire (LHPS). Special academic tutoring and scheme are granted to the players in need.

== Arms, motto, crest, and memorials ==
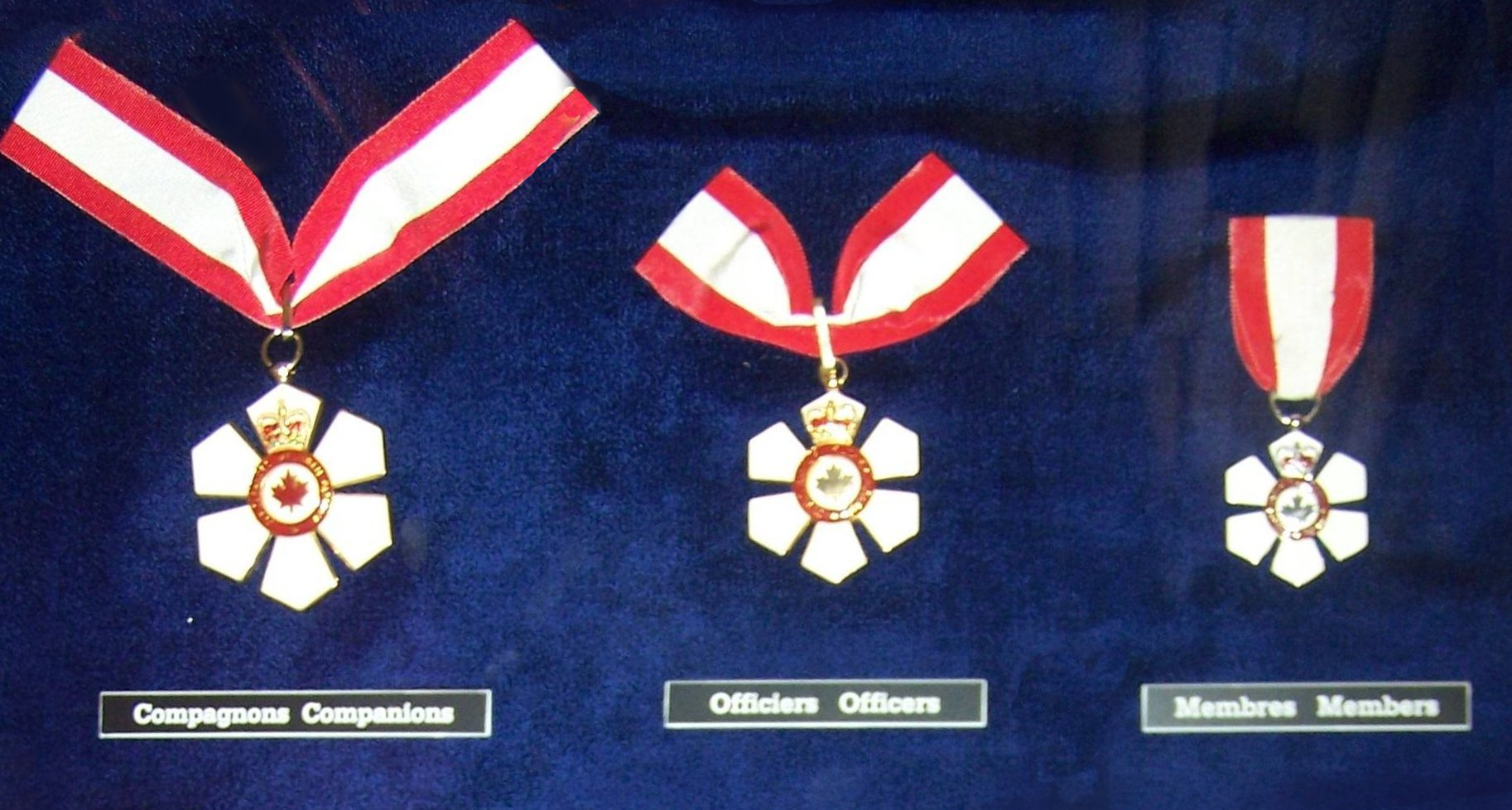
Order of Canada Insignia

=== Arms and badge ===
Motto: RECTI CULTUS PECTORA ROBORANT; This phrase in Latin translates to "Good learning habits strengthen the hearts" which also stands the motto of Bishop's University.

BCS shared a crest with Bishop's University for over a century. However, with its growing independence and the amalgamation with King's Hall, a new coat of arms was needed. Registered in the Canadian Heraldic Authority, the coats of arms and the badge presented to BCS by Prince Philip and the first Chief Herald of Canada, Robert Watt in 1989 has the following characteristics:

Arms: There is an argent on a Cross Gules an open book (bible) edged and bound Or in the canton a rose Argent barbed Vert seeded Or fimbriated Azure all within a bordure Purpure;

Crest: A mitre Argent the orphreys semé of maple leaves Gules; The mitre corresponds to the name of the school, " bishop's ". The maple leaves on the mitre indicate the Canadian base and identity of the school.

Symbolism: The Cross of St. George and the book are found in the arms of Bishop's University, for which the school was established as a feeder institution, hence the addition of a border. The Saint George's Cross shows a link to the Anglican Church and to Great Britain as a loyalist.

The book signifies BCS as an institution devoted for educational purposes. Purple is a colour used by bishops in the Anglican church and Christian religion in general, as well as being the school's colour symbol. The white rose was used as an emblem by King's Hall.

The badge combines elements of the emblems used by Bishop's College School and Kings Hall, the mitre and the rose: A rose Argent barbed Vert charged with a mitre Argent fimbriated Purpure the orphreys semé of maple leaves Gules.

=== Other crests ===
On the grant to BCS, the Sovereign's insignia of the Order of Canada was depicted below the Royal Arms of Canada. This is the only instance where the Sovereign's badge has been incorporated into a grant document.

There are over fifteen other crests of BCS alumni or faculty families merged in the architecture of the School House. In the Ross Dining Hall, around 20 BCS partner schools' crest has been oil-painted on the wooden structures. Such as the ones of Upper Canada College, Ashbury College, St. Michaels University School, Appleby College, Deerfield Academy (US), etc.

=== BCS uniform and ties ===
Students are awarded school ties based on their involvement in various clubs and activities, to mark membership in a residence, to recognize academic or athletic achievement, or to acknowledge a leadership position. There are over thirty different ties including House ties, Band and Choir ties, Prefect ties, Yearbook ties, First Team ties, Achievement ties, and Chapel Warden ties.

There are three types of uniforms at BCS: No.1 uniform, No.2 and the cadet uniform. The boys' cadet uniform adopts the style of the Black Watch back in 1936, while both genders use the Black Watch balmoral.

=== Black Watch tartan ===
The Girl's Uniform at BCS features a green and black kilt, the tartan associated with the Black Watch. The ranks of the Royal Canadian Army Cadets are allowed to be sewn onto the BCS school blazer.

== Notable BCS or KHC people ==
=== Notable faculty ===
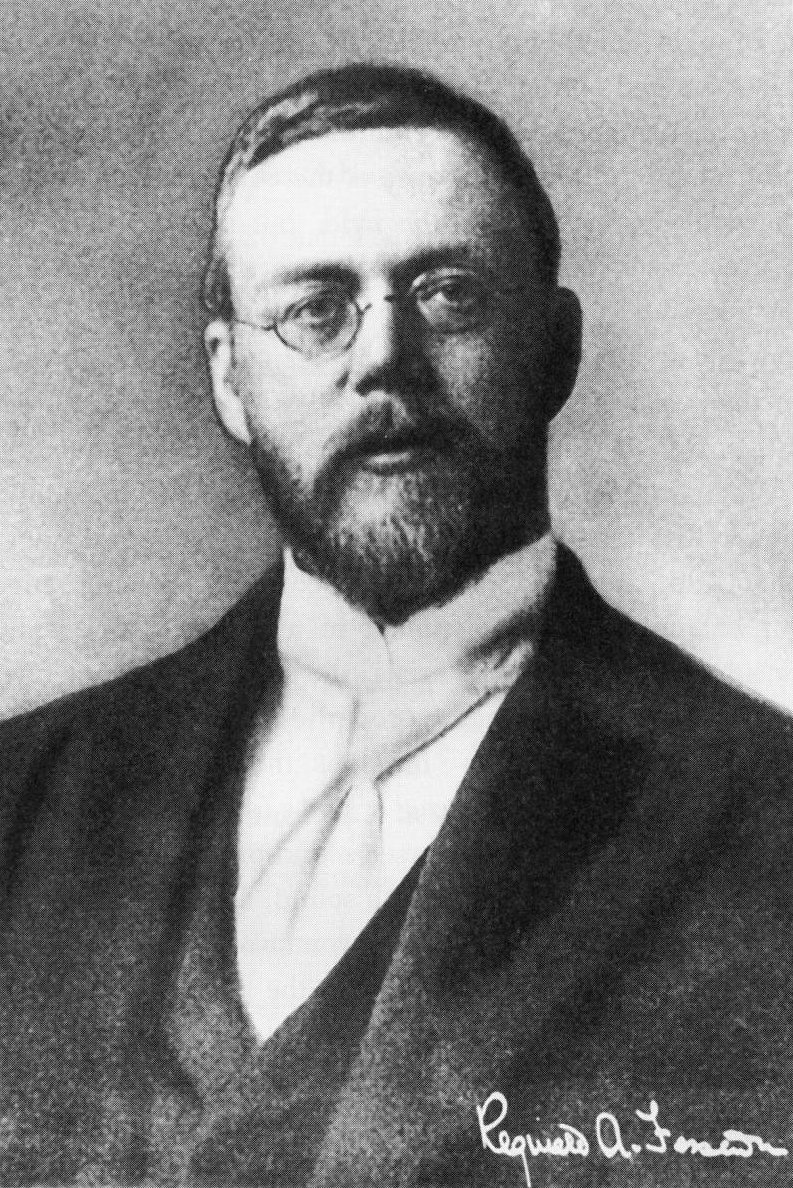
Reginald Fessenden, Inventor of AM broadcasting

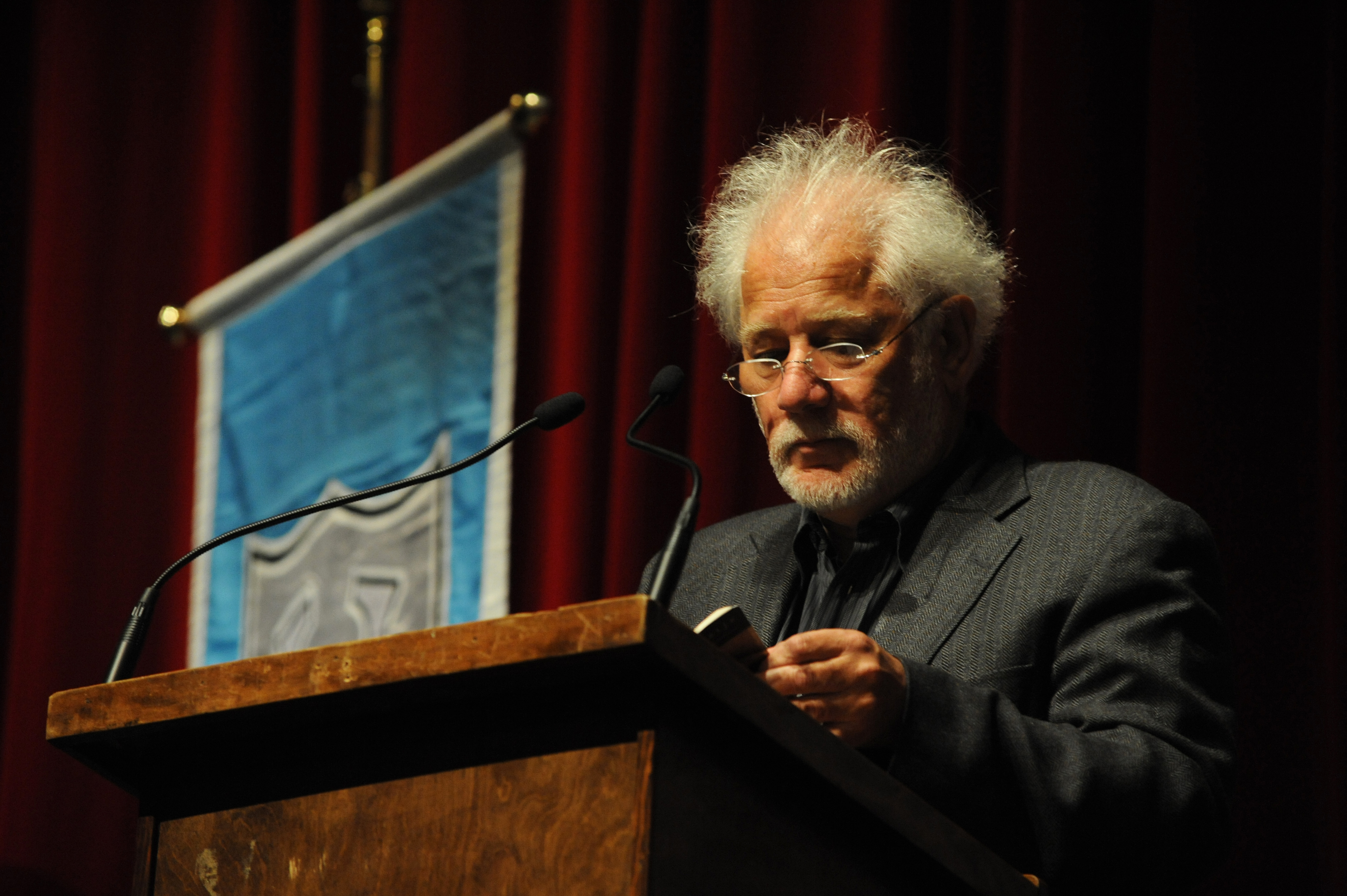
Michael Ondaatje CC FRSL, Author of The English Patient

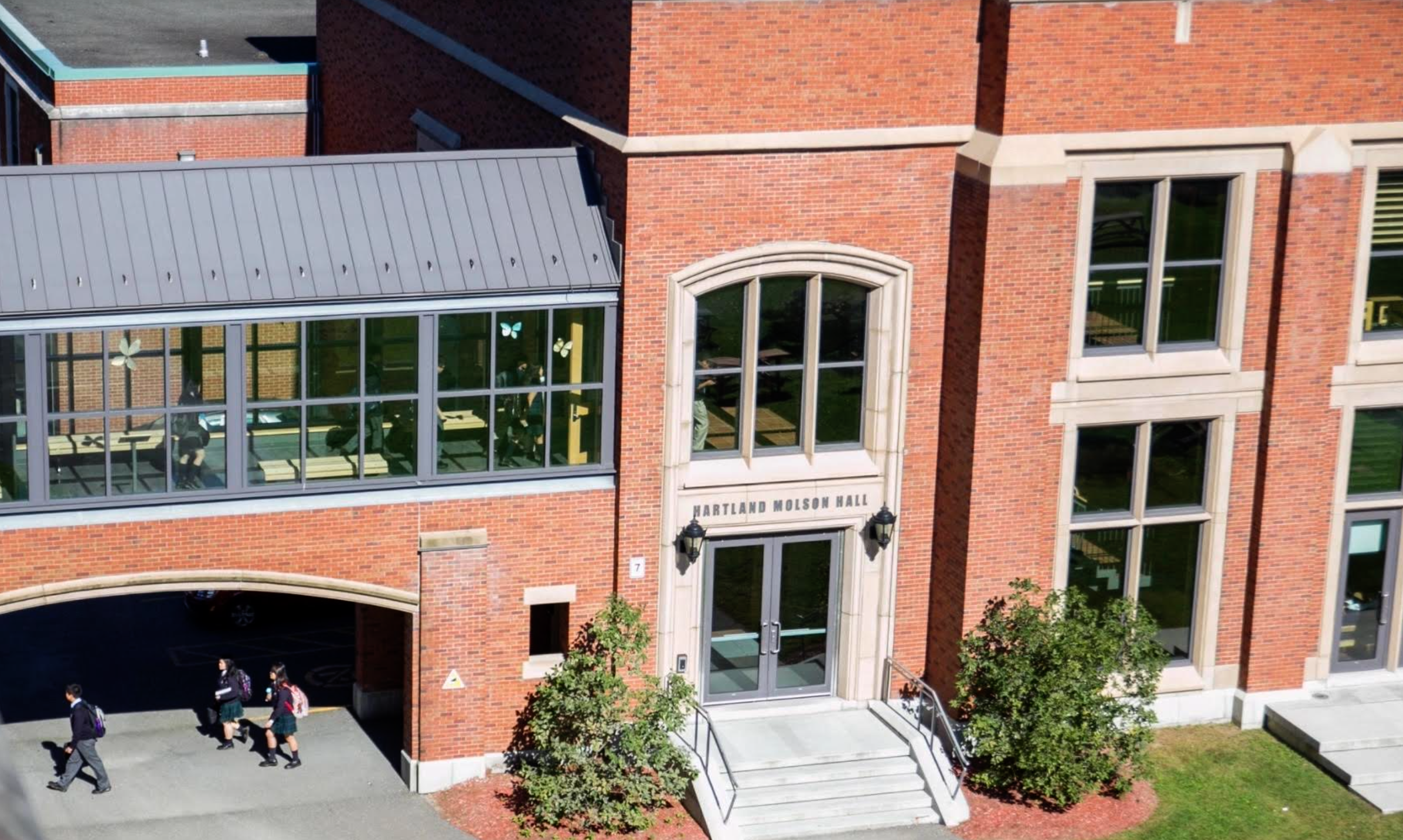
Hartland Molson Hall and Glass Passage, Bishop's College School

Famous faculty include Nobel Prize laureate Rudyard Kipling; Reginald Fessenden, the inventor of radio and math teacher; and Housemaster (houseparent) Prince Alexis S. Troubetzkoy, international author notable for his works on Russian history who was also the headmaster of Selwyn House School, Appleby College, and the Toronto French School; Canadian Economist John Farthing who acted as a master and director of the hockey program; Church of England bishop Andrew Hunter Dunn and minister Henry Roe, etc. Famous coaching staff include singer Robert Bédard (1931– ) who was the President of Tennis Québec & the vice-president of Tennis Canada, a French and geography teacher;, Stéphan Lebeau, a professional hockey player who won a Stanley Cup with the Montreal Canadiens.

=== Notable alumni ===
Despite the small size of its student population, no less than forty former students have been inducted into the Order of Canada, ten to the Distinguished Service Order, five to the Order of the British Empire & Order of the Bath, three to the National Order of Quebec & Order of St Michael and St George, two to the Order of Ontario and one Royal Victorian Order. At least fifty former students have been elected as member of parliament (regardless of location) with Sir James David Edgar BCS'1850 named the Speaker of the House of Commons of Canada. Eight have been named to the Queen's Privy Council for Canada. Seven BCS-ers have been named Rhodes Scholars.

Famous BCS and KHC alumni include: Michael Ondaatje, Paul Almond, Anthony Graham, Robert Fowler (diplomat), Reginald Fessenden, Jake Eberts, Noah Dobson, Dawson Mercer, Tom Nütten, Richard H. Tomlinson, Norman Webster, Roy Heenan, Peter Bronfman, The Hon. Hartland Molson, Eric Molson, Sharon Pollock, Stuart McLean, Clive M. Law, Ernie McLea, Edward O. Phillips, Ron Graham (author), Egan Chambers, Greg Stevenson, Timothy Porteous, The Hon. J. K. L. Ross, James Ross (Canadian businessman), General Sir William Heneker, C. Temple Emmet, John W. H. Bassett, The Hon. Raymond Setlakwe, The Hon. General Andrew McNaughton, Hartland MacDougall, William Watson Ogilvie, Giles Walker, Jackson Dodds, The Hon. Harry Woodburn Blaylock, Lieutenant General Sir Louis Jean Bols, John Calder, Ted Workman, George Hurst, Ntare Mwine, Scott Abbott, Howard Ryshpan, Robert Bédard, Diana Fowler LeBlanc, The Hon. George Harold Baker, The Hon. Landon Pearson, Charles Drury, George Carlyle Marler, Lieutenant General Kenneth Stuart, Loran Ellis Baker (politician), Major General William Henry Pferinger Elkins, Ntare Guma Mbaho Mwine, John H. C. McGreevy, The Right Hon. Andrew Hamilton Gault, Sir James David Edgar, Richard Smeaton White, 2nd & 3rd Baron Shaughnessy of Montreal, Sir William Price, The Right Hon. Greville Janner, The Hon. Colin Kenny, The Hon. Matthew Henry Cochrane, The Hon. Arthur Deane Nesbitt, Peter Bronfman, Sir Frederick Oscar Warren Loomis, Sir Hugh Allan, General Sir Henry Edward Burstall, Derek Bryson Park, etc.

As the school was Anglican, the school also raised a lot of religious figures, not limited to: The Most Rev. Clarendon Worrell, the Right Rev. James Williams (bishop), The Right Rev. Edward John Bidwell, Bishop Ernest Graham Ingham, The Right Rev. Lennox Waldron Williams, The Right Rev. Tim Matthews, etc.

=== BCS Alma Mater Society ===
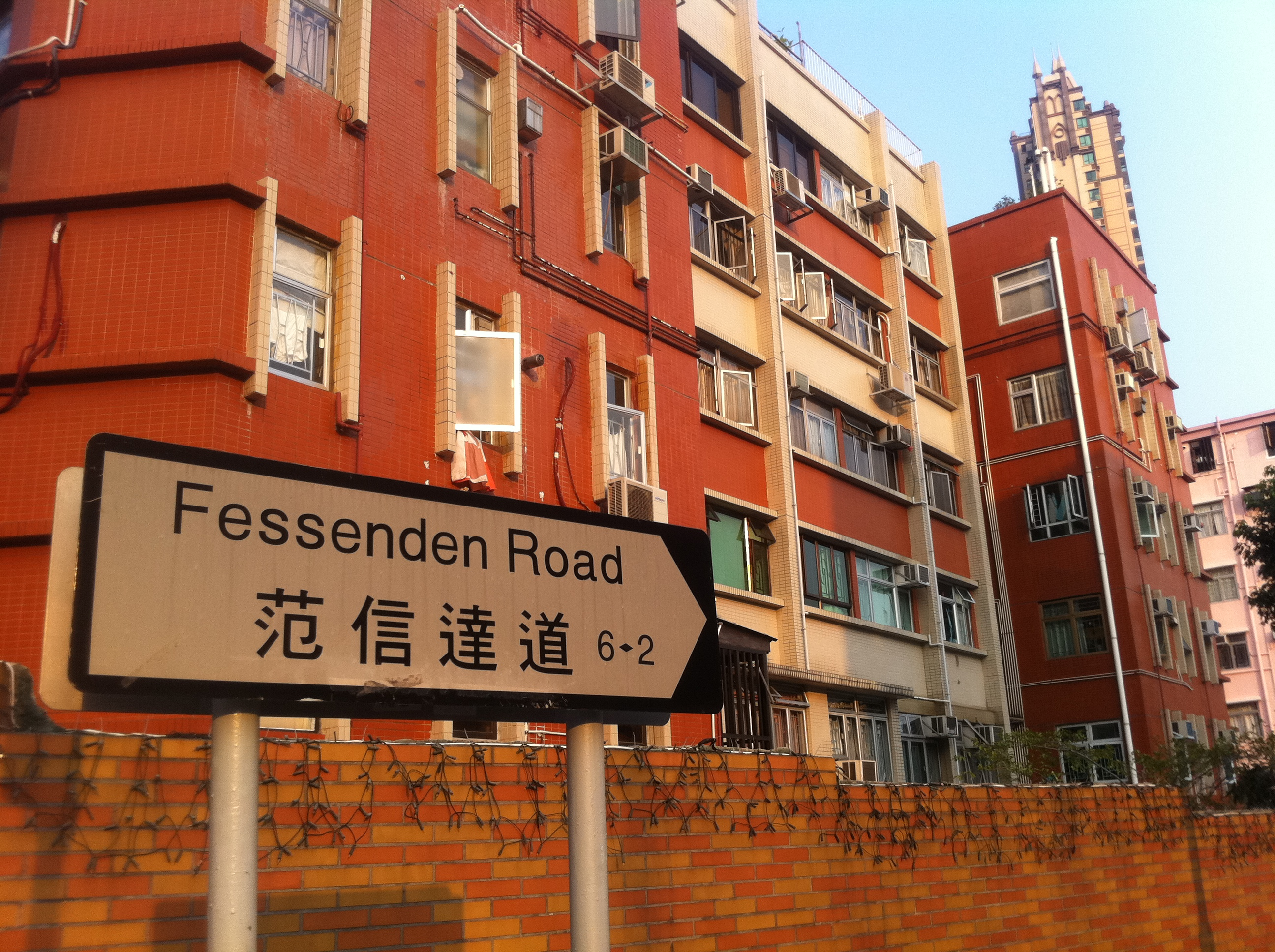
A Street named by former BCS faculty member Reginald Fessenden in Hong Kong

The Charter of the Old Boys Association of BCS (an old boys network) was officially granted on page 295, Chap 93 of the Statue de la province de Québec in 1901, and later changed to the BCS Alumni Association after the merger with KHC. The Heneker–Williams society honours people who, by leadership and example, have set the standard for volunteer support of BCS and KHC. Leader of a graduating classes of alumni in specific geographical locations are referred as Class Agents; BCS Ambassadors manage the communications for reunions. The school's advancement office holds activities annually including Homecoming weekend, alumni hockey tournaments & rugby games, as well as dinners and social gatherings in cities throughout the world. There are around 7,000 living alumni today.

Career Day is an opportunity for alumni and parents share their expertise and professional work experience with current students. The annual BCS Ondaatje Endeavour is founded by the Michael Ondaatje Foundation.

== BCS publications ==
Bishop's University and BCS shared the same yearbook, the Mitre prior to the 20th century. The first edition of the independent BCS yearbook, then known as the BCS Magazine was published in 1880. The yearbook remains autonomously edited by the students. The BCS Newsletter (BCS Bulletin), BCS Brief & BCS Communications, Keep Troth magazine (for KHC old girls), are seasonal publications by the school advancement office.

== In media ==
=== Films ===
The 2001 film Lost and Delirious directed by Léa Pool and loosely based on the novel The Wives of Bath by Susan Swan premiered at the 2001 Sundance Film Festival. and was shot entirely in Lennoxville. Many scenes were shot at BCS as well as Bishop's University. BCS' wooded trails and residences were used as was Ross Dining Hall, which was the setting of major conflicts in the film.

The 1983 movie Ups & Downs about prep-school life, directed by the award-winning alumnus Paul Almond and Lewis Evans (alum and retired headmaster), was inspired by the setting of BCS though filmed somewhere else.

=== Literature ===
Literary works which relate with BCS include From Moulton Hill to Little Forks by J. Graham Patriquin, Wake Me in the Morning by Giles Walker, and Seven Days in Hell: Canada's Battle for Normandy and the Rise of the Black Watch by David O'Keefe (historian)，and The History of King's Hall, Compton, 1874–1972 by Elizabeth Hearn Milner. '

== BCS school song and hymn ==
The school hymn of BCS is "And Did Those Feet in Ancient Time, which signifies the episcopal and anglophone background of the school. The school song of BCS "Lennoxville Vivat Dicimus", in Latin has no exact record of its creation, but it was composed no later than 1894 as recorded in the Mitre Magazine.

== Chairman of Bishop's College School ==
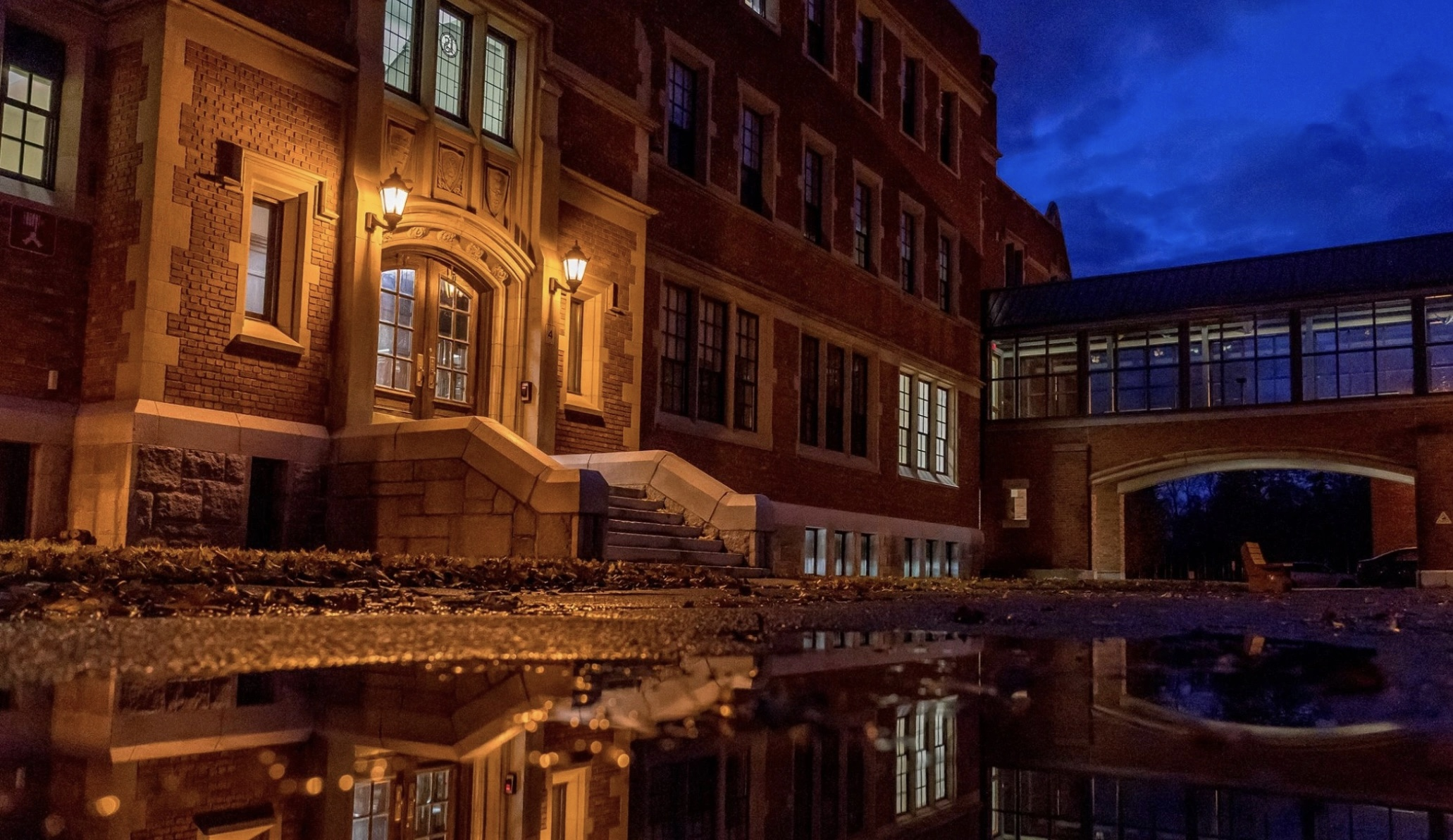
BCS Squad

As of an act passed in parliament in October 1879, BCS obtained financial independence from the Bishop's University and established the Bishop's College School Association under a capital stock of five hundred dollars registered under the company act of Québec. The corporation that forms by the Lord Bishop of Quebec and 11 other members. Prior to 1879, the position of chairman was co-occupied by the bishop and the principal/chancellor of Bishop's University as BCS acted as the constituent junior division. For Convenience, the following list does not contain the Bishops and can be consulted here Template:Anglican Bishops of Quebec.

- 1845–1853 The Rev. Jasper Hume Nicolls, 1845
- 1853–1856 The Hon. William Walker, M.L.C.
- 1856–1858 The Hon. Edward Bowen, K.C., D.C.L.
- 1858–1865 The Hon. John Samuel McCord, D.C.L.
- 1865–1875 The Hon. Edward Hale, M.L.A., D.C.L.
- 1875–1878 The Hon. George Irvine, M.L.A., D.C.L.
- 1879–1902 Richard William Heneker, Esq.
- 1902–1908 H. R. Fraser
- 1908–1912 R. Campbell
- 1912- 1914 Sir H. Montagu Allan, C.V.O.
- 1914–1922 J. K. L. Ross
- 1922–1934 Grant Hall
- 1934–1939 P. F. Sise
- 1939–1945 E. de L. Greenwood
- 1945–1951 Captain William Watson Ogilvie
- 1951–1963 The Hon. William Mitchell, BCS'26
- 1963–1969 Robert R. McLernon, BCS'32
- 1969–1984 H. G. Hallward
- 1984–1988 Shirley H. Stoker, KHC'46
- 1988–1991 Stuart H. Cobbett, BCS'66
- 1991–1994 Rae Heenan, KHC'55
- 1994–1997 François de Sainte Marie, BCS'65
- 1997–2000 Patterson Webster
- 2000–2004 Douglas Patriquin, BCS'64
- 2004–2008 David J. Stenason, BCS'75
- 2008–2013 Kurt A. Johnson, BCS'84
- 2013–2018 Timothy E. Price, BCS'75

== Headmasters (Rectors) of Bishop's College School ==
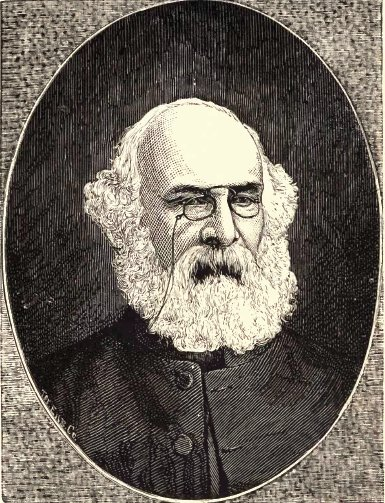
The Right Rev. James William Williams, Fourth Bishop of Quebec and known to be the first BCS old boy to hold the Rectorship of BCS (Position of Headmaster)

- 1836–1842 The Rev. Lucius Doolittle, M.A., Vermont
- 1842–1845 Edward Chapman, M.A., Caius College, Cambridge
- 1842–1845 Henry Hooper Miles, M.A., D.C.L., King's College, Cambridge
- 1849–1854 Rev. J. Butler, M.A.
- 1857–1863 Rev. James Williams (bishop), M.A., D.D., Pembroke College, Cambridge
- 1863–1867 Rev. G.C. Irving, M.A., St. John's College, Cambridge
- 1867–1870 Rev. R. H. Walker, M.A., Wadham College, Oxford
- 1870–1877 Rev. C. H. Badgley, M.A., Queen's College, Oxford
- 1877–1882 Rev. P. C. Read, M.A., Lincoln College, Oxford
- 1882–1883 Rev. Issac Brock, M.A., Queen's College, Oxford
- 1883–1885 Rev. J. A. Lobley, M.A., D.C.L., Trinity College, Cambridge
- 1885–1891 Rev. Thomas Adams, M.A., D.C.L., St. John's College, Cambridge
- 1891–1903 H. J. H. Petry, M.A., D.C.L., St. John's College, Cambridge
- 1903–1909 Rev. E. J. Bidwell, M.A., D.C.L., Bishop's University
- 1909–1910 Rev. W. Duncan Standfast, B.A., Jesus College, Oxford
- 1910–1920 J. Tyson. Williams, B.A., Emmanuel College, Cambridge
- 1919 Arthur Sneath, B.A., St. John's College, Oxford
- 1920–1931 S. Percy Smith, M.A., D.C.L., St. John's College, Oxford
- 1931–1950 Crawford G. M. Grier, M.A., Balliol College, Oxford
- 1950–1960 C. L. Ogden Glass, B.A., M.A., D'U, St. John's College, Oxford & Sherbrooke
- 1960–1974 Frederick R. Patterson, M.A., Peterhouse, Cambridge
- 1964–1972 F. Stewart Large, B.A., Toronto, M.A., Columbia

== See also ==
- List of royal tours of Canada (18th–20th centuries)
- The Black Watch (Royal Highland Regiment) of Canada
