= James Williams (bishop) =

Canadian Church of England priest, bishop, and educator

- Bishop of Quebec
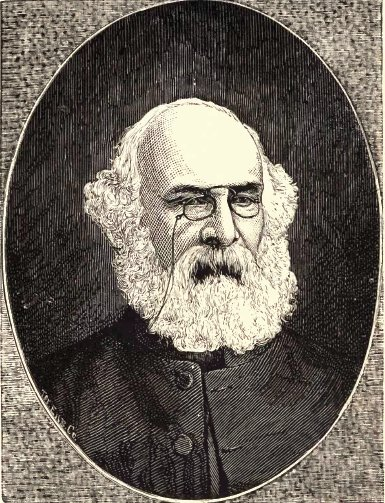
- Predecessor: George Mountain
- Successor: Andrew Hunter Dunn

Personal details
- Born: 1825 Overton, Hampshire, United Kingdom
- Died: April 20, 1892 (aged 66–67) Quebec City, Quebec, Canada

James William Williams (1825 – April 20, 1892) was a Canadian Church of England priest, bishop, and educator.

Born in Overton, Hampshire, United Kingdom, the son of David Williams and Sarah Eliza, Williams graduated from Pembroke College, Oxford in 1851. He was ordained deacon in 1852 and received his ordination as a priest in 1855. Williams immigrated to Lower Canada in 1857 when he was appointed rector of the Lennoxville grammar school (Bishop's College School) and the chairman of former BCS sister school King's Hall Compton. In 1860, he was appointed a professor at Bishop's College, Lennoxville. In 1863, he was appointed fourth Bishop of Quebec. His son, Lennox, was later sixth Bishop of Quebec.

He participated vigorously in the development of the Protestant public school system in Québec and collaborated with Sir Alexander Galt in drawing up Section 93 of the British North American Act (Constitution Act, 1867) which conferred upon Parliament the responsibility of protecting the educational rights of minorities.
