= Norman Webster =

Canadian journalist (1941–2021)

Norman Eric Webster
- Born: June 4, 1941; Summerside, Prince Edward Island, Canada
- Died: November 19, 2021 (aged 80); Magog, Quebec, Canada

Norman Eric Webster CM (June 4, 1941 – November 19, 2021) was a Canadian journalist and an editor-in-chief of The Globe and Mail and The Gazette. He was one of the three western journalists in the Chinese capital Beijing during the Cultural Revolution in 1969.

Born in Summerside, Prince Edward Island, he was educated at Bishop's College School and received his B.A. from Bishop's University. He was a Rhodes Scholar at St John's College, Oxford. He took part in the 1962 Oxford-Cambridge Tour of Poland and Czechoslovakia and was awarded a Full Blue for ice hockey in 1963 and 1964. He went on to a distinguished career as a foreign correspondent, editor and columnist.

In 1995, he was made a Member of the Order of Canada.

He died after a long battle with Parkinson's disease in Magog, Quebec, on November 19, 2021, at the age of 80.

== See also ==
- List of Bishop's College School alumni
