= Henry Roe =

Henry Roe (22 February 1829 – 3 August 1909) was a Church of England minister. He was also a professor and author. He was born in Henryville Lower Canada to a large family and his father, John Hill Roe, was a doctor.

Roe was a professor of divinity at Bishop's College and Second Master at Bishop's College School when It was an emerging institution. He also published theological treatises and letters that were in opposition to a number of Roman Catholic teachings. In performing his teaching, writing, and ministry, he advocated a particular brand of Canadian Anglicanism. It was not necessarily an intellectual approach but it became the norm for the Anglican Church in Quebec.
