= Lucius Doolittle =

American rector

The Rev. Lucius Doolittle
- Born: 23 May 1800; Lyndon, Vermont
- Died: 18 May 1862 (aged 61); Lennoxville, Quebec
- Occupations: Rector of Sherbrooke and Lennoxville
- Notable work: Founder of Bishop's College School and Bishop's University

The Reverend Lucius Doolittle (23 May 1800 – 18 May 1862) was a Church of England priest.

After receiving a B.A. and honorary M.A. from the University of Vermont, Doolittle founded Bishop's College School in 1836 (as Lennoxville Classical School with Cambridge-Graduate Edward Chapman) and co-founded Bishop's University in 1843 in Quebec, Canada.

Doolittle also acted as the rector of Sherbrooke and the borough of Lennoxville. Bishop's College School is Canada's fifth-oldest functioning private school.
