= Jasper Hume Nicolls =

Principal of Bishop's College
- In office 1845–1877
- Preceded by: Position created in 1845
- Succeeded by: Joseph Albert Lobley

Personal details
- Born: October 17, 1818 Guernsey, Channel Islands
- Died: August 8, 1877 (aged 58) Lennoxville, Quebec, Canada

Jasper Hume Nicolls (October 17, 1818 – August 8, 1877 ) was a Canadian Anglican priest and first Principal of Bishop's College (now Bishop's University).

Born in Guernsey, the son of General Gustavus Nicolls and Heriot Frances Thomson, Nicolls was raised in British North America in Halifax, Nova Scotia and Quebec City where his father commanded the Royal Engineers in Canada from 1815 to 1837. Nicolls received a Bachelor of Arts degree in 1840 from Oriel College, Oxford and was made a fellow of The Queen's College, Oxford in 1843. He was ordained deacon in 1844 and priest in 1845. He returned to Canada in 1845 when he was appointed the first principal of Bishop's University. He remained in this position until his death in 1877.
