= David O'Keeffe (footballer) =

Australian rules footballer

Personal information
- Full name: David O'Keeffe
- Born: 20 February 1962 (age 64)
- Original team: Newcomb
- Height: 189 cm (6 ft 2 in)
- Weight: 89 kg (196 lb)

Playing career^{1}
Years	Club	Games (Goals)
1982–1986	Geelong	50 (22)
1987–1991	Brisbane Bears	68 (25)
Total		118 (47)
- ^{1} Playing statistics correct to the end of 1991.

David O'Keeffe (born 20 February 1962) is a former Australian rules footballer who played with Geelong and the Brisbane Bears in the Victorian/Australian Football League (VFL/AFL).

Recruited locally, O'Keeffe was a member of the Geelong reserves premiership in 1982. A wingman, he had his best season in 1984 when he made 19 appearances, took 70 marks, and averaged 14 disposals.

O'Keeffe played in Brisbane's first ever VFL game in the opening round of the 1987 season and a total of 16 games that year. He continued to be a regular fixture in the team and missed just two games in 1989. In their upset win over Hawthorn that season, O'Keeffe played as a full-back and kept Jason Dunstall to three goals.

In 1991, O'Keeffe's final season, he played just four AFL games but finished his career on a high by participating in the reserves grand final win over Melbourne.
