= George Mountain (bishop) =

British-Canadian Anglican bishop (1789–1863)

The Right Reverend George Mountain
- Anglican Bishop of Quebec
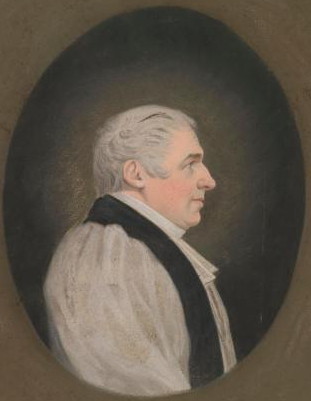

Personal details
- Born: 27 July 1789 Norwich, Norfolk, Great Britain
- Died: 6 January 1863 (aged 73) Bardfield, Sillery, Canada East
- Occupation: Church of England priest First Principal of McGill College; Founder of Bishop's University and Bishop's College Grammar School

George Jehoshaphat Mountain (27 July 1789 – 6 January 1863) was a British-Canadian Anglican bishop (3rd Anglican Bishop of Quebec), the first Principal of McGill College from 1824 to 1835, and one of the founders of Bishop's University and Bishop's College School.

== Biography ==
Born in Norwich, Norfolk (England), 27 July 1789, he was the second son of Jacob Mountain (1749–1825), a bishop and politician, by his wife Elizabeth Mildred Wale co-heiress of Little Bardfield Hall, near Thaxted, Essex. Mountain was claimed to be directly descended from Michel de Montaigne. In 1793 he moved with his family to Quebec City when his father was appointed the first Anglican Bishop of Quebec by his friend William Pitt the Younger.

He lived with his family at Marchmont House, near Quebec, where he received his early education before returning to England at the age of sixteen to study under private tutors until he matriculated from Trinity College, Cambridge, graduating Bachelor of Arts (BA) in 1810, and Doctor of Divinity (DD) in 1819. He removed again to Canada in 1811, and, becoming secretary to his father, was ordained deacon in 1812 and priest in 1816, at the same time being appointed evening lecturer in Quebec Cathedral.

He was rector of Fredericton, New Brunswick, from 1814 to 1817, when he returned to Quebec as rector of that parish and bishop's official. In 1821 he became Archdeacon of Lower Canada. On 14 February 1836 he was consecrated, at Lambeth, Bishop suffragan of Montreal, as coadjutor to Charles Stewart, Bishop of Quebec.

Stewart shortly afterwards proceeded to Britain (dying in 1837), and the care of the entire diocese was under Mountain's administration (remaining Bishop of Montreal) until 1839, when Upper Canada was made a separate see in Toronto . It was through his earnest exertions that Rupert's Land was also, in 1849, erected into an episcopal see.

He continued to administer all Lower Canada as Bishop coadjutor of Montreal until 1850, when he secured the constitution of the Diocese of Montreal, he himself retaining the Diocese of Quebec (but now as diocesan Bishop of Quebec), by far the poorer and more laborious of the two. During the greater part of his ministerial career he had to perform long, tedious, and often dangerous journeys into the interior of a wild and unsettled country, paying frequent visits to the north-west territory, the eastern townships, the Magdalen Islands, and the shores of Labrador; also to Rupert's Land, some 3,600 miles, in an Indigenous canoe.

He came to Britain in 1853 to confer with William Broughton, the metropolitan of Australasia, on the subject of synodical action in colonial churches, and he received the degree of Doctor of Civil Law (DCL) at the University of Oxford.

The greatest of his works was the establishment in 1845 of the Lower Canadian Church University, Bishop's College, Lennoxville, for the education of clergymen. His missionary journey to the Red River Colony is recorded in The Journal of the Bishop of Montreal, during a Visit to the Church Missionary Society's North-West America Mission; it remains a lasting church historical and ethnographic resource.

Mountain was a learned theologian, an elegant scholar, and powerful preacher. He died at Bardfield in Sillery, on 6 January 1863.

=== Career in Education ===
From 1824 to 1835, he was the first principal of McGill University and professor of divinity. Many first-year students today live in the Bishop Mountain Residences ("Upper Rez") which bears his name. In 1843, he was instrumental in the founding of Bishop's University in Lennoxville, Quebec. He is also responsible for creating the Link of Bishop's University with Bishop's College School who founded in 1836 which was then called Lennoxville Classical School, and helped the new Bishop's College Grammar School (BCS) to survive financially and executively through many leadership roles.

== Works ==
Besides many single sermons, charges, and pamphlets, Mountain wrote:

- The Journal of the Bishop of Montreal during a Visit to the Church Missionary Society's North-West American Mission (1845; ²1849)
- Songs of the Wilderness; being a Collection of Poems (1846)
- Journal of a Visitation in a Portion of the Diocese, by the Lord Bishop of Montreal (1847)
- Sermons published at the Request of the Synod of the Diocese (1865)

== Streets and Building named ==
Two adjacent parallel streets in downtown Montreal are said to be named in his honour: Bishop and Mountain. However, the origin of the first name is uncertain, and the name chemin de la Montagne for the second street is found in maps dating to 1761 and 1778, before his birth or the arrival of his father in Quebec.

A Bishop's University residence is named after him. A copy of his oil painting was stored in Bishop's College School Archives and presented annually in the past yearbooks.

A McGill dining hall is also named after Bishop Mountain.
