= David O'Keefe (historian) =

Canadian historian

- Born: February 9, 1967
- Education: University of Ottawa; Concordia University; McGill University; Dawson College; Marianopolis College
- Occupations: Historian, professor

David R. O'Keefe (born February 9, 1967) is a Canadian historian, television presenter, and writer. He is known for presenting War Junk alongside Gemini nominated and Emmy award-winning producer and director Wayne Abbott. He has appeared on television and radio networks including CBC Radio, Global Television, CTV Television Network, UKTV Network and History TV channel.

== Education ==
O'Keefe studied at Concordia and McGill Universities in Montreal before attending the University of Ottawa for his graduate studies. He remained at the University of Ottawa for four years as a research assistant and lecturer on Military and Diplomatic History before teaching at the College level in Montreal as a professor of Modern and Military History. Today, O'Keefe teaches history at Marianopolis College in Westmount, Quebec.

== Career ==
O'Keefe served as an infantry officer in the Royal Highland Regiment (The Black Watch of Canada) in Montreal, and was later employed as their historian for nearly a decade. In addition, he worked as a Signals Intelligence specialist for the Department of National Defence and conducted research for the Official History of the Royal Canadian Navy in the Second World War. O'Keefe has researched in Canada, the United States and the United Kingdom.

O'Keefe's publications include articles in Canadian Defence Quarterly, the Journal of Canadian Military History, and the Canadian Army Journal, including a chapter in Great War Commands: Historical Perspective on Canadian Army Leadership 1914–1918. Recently, O’Keefe was signed by Knopf (Random House) Canada Publishers to write his first full-length monograph on the Dieppe Raid. His research on the Dieppe Raid began almost two decades ago and has continued throughout his graduate work and his career as an academic and documentarian.

In addition to his academic pursuits, O'Keefe has served as a historian for History Television in Canada for 15 years and appeared on CBC Radio, Global Television, CTV Television Network, UKTV Network in Great Britain. During his time with History Television, he was worked on numerous television documentaries and publications, including the Camp X (1999); Murder in Normandy: The Trial of Kurt Meyer (1999); and Forced March to Freedom (2001) for David Paperny Productions. In 2002, he collaborated with Wayne Abbott for the Gemini-nominated four-part series, From a Place Called War. They continued collaborating for over a decade, producing Black Watch: Massacre on Verrières Ridge for History Television; the two-part History Television program Bloody Normandy and Bloody Victory; The Secret War Files for History Television; Battle of the Mace; and most recently, Dieppe Uncovered, and the television series, War Junk, both for History Television. He is currently in discussions for a TV series based on his research into Ultra and its impact on the history of the Second World War.

== Publications ==
=== Books ===
- One Day in August: The Untold Story Behind Canada’s Tragedy at Dieppe. re-examines the disastrous raid at Dieppe, France, taking recently uncovered evidence into account. Released: Oct. 2014.
- Seven Days in Hell: Canada's Battle for Normandy and the Rise of the Black Watch Snipers. Released: Aug. 2020.

=== Publication credits ===
- "It Means Men's Lives: Training, Preparation and Innovation for Battle – the case of Major-General Loomis 1917" – article in Canada's Red Hackle, (Spring 2009)
- "War’s Fickle Fate: The Sammy Nichol Saga" – article in Esprit de Corps Volume 15, Issue 1 (Spring 2008)
- "With Blinders On: The Black Watch and the Battle for Spycker, Sept 12–14, 1944" in Canadian Army Journal (Spring 2008)
- "A Brutal Soul-Destroying Business: Brigadier-General F.O.W. Loomis and the Question of "Impersonal Generalship" in Godefroy", A. ed. Great War Commands: Historical Perspectives on Canadian Army Leadership, 1914–1918 (2010)
- "Double Edged Sword Part I: Ultra and Operation Totalize, Normandy, August 8, 1944" in Canadian Army Journal Vol. 12 No 3, (Winter 2010) 85–93
- "Double Edged Sword Part II: Ultra and Operation Totalize, Normandy, August 8, 1944" in Canadian Army Journal (Forthcoming Summer 2013)
- "Voices from Vimy: The Lost Battle Diary of Major-Gen F.O.W. Loomi"– article in Canada's Red Hackle (Summer 2007)
- "Pushing their Necks Out: Ultra and the Black Watch at May-sur-Orne, Normandy August 5, 1944" – article in Canadian Military History (Spring 2006)
- "The Eleventh Hour: Intelligence and the Black Watch during Operation Spring July 25, 1944" – article in Canada's Red Hackle (Spring 2005)
- Canadian Defence Quarterly, Toronto, Ontario, Article: "Fortune's Fate: The Question of Operational Intelligence for Operation "Spring" – July 25, 1944". (Spring 1995 issue)
- Laurier Centre for Military, Strategic and Disarmament Studies, Wilfrid Laurier University May 1996 – Conference Paper: "The Other Side of the Hill: Operational Intelligence and the Canadian Attack at Verriéres Ridge, July 25, 1944"

== Lectures ==
- Bedford St. Martins History of Western Civilization PowerPoint lecture series for Hunt, Making of the West (2001)
- Hudson Historical Society, Hudson Quebec, Spring, 2007. "Lecture: Ridges are not Kind to Infantry: The Black Watch at Verriéres Ridge."
- Canadian Armed Forces, Directorate of Land Concepts and Designs, Kingston, Ontario. Spring, 2009 Lecture: "Anatomy of Disaster: The Black Watch at Verriéres Ridge."

== Awards and honours ==
O'Keefe is a recipient of the Queen's Diamond Jubilee Medal awarded by then Minister of Veterans Affairs, Honourable Steven Blaney for his services to Canada in the field of historical research on the Dieppe Raid.
