= Rankings of universities in Canada =

Rankings of universities in Canada are typically published annually by a variety of nationally, and internationally based publications. Rankings of post-secondary institutions have most often been conducted by magazines, newspapers, websites, governments, or academia. Ranking are established to help inform potential applicants about universities in Canada based on a range of criteria, including student body characteristics, classes, faculty, finances, library, and reputation. Various rankings consider combinations of factors, including funding and endowment, research excellence and/or influence, specialization expertise, admissions, student options, award numbers, internationalization, graduate employment, industrial linkage, historical reputation and other criteria. Various rankings also evaluate universities based on research output.

Several Canadian-based publication have produced rankings of universities in Canada, the most prominent being the news magazine Maclean's under the name Guide to Canadian Universities which began in 1991. Canadian-based publications have generally limited their rankings to only universities in Canada. Several universities in Canada have also placed in rankings which includes other universities from around the world; such as Academic Ranking of World Universities, QS World University Rankings, the Times Higher Education World University Rankings, and the U.S. News & World Report Best Global University Ranking.

== International rankings ==
=== Opinion-based ===
Several international publications assess the quality of a university by using the weighted average of opinions gathered in surveys, alongside other quantitative measures. Those surveyed typically include members of academia and the business community. These types of rankings include Quacquarelli Symonds's World University Ranking, The Times Higher Education World University Ranking, and the U.S. News & World Report's Best Global University Ranking.

The following table includes Canadian universities, and their most recent global rank in the aforementioned publications (with national ranks in parentheses):

University	2026 QS World University Ranking (Note: Although 2026 is used in the title, the following was released in June 2025)	2026 Times Higher Education World University Ranking (Note: Although the year 2026 is used in the title, the following was released in October 2025)	2026 U.S. News & World Report Best Global University Ranking
University of Alberta	94 (4)	119 (5)	156 (5)
University of British Columbia	40 (3)	45 (3)	41 (2)
Brock University	1201–1400 (28–30)	1201-1500 (30-33)	1637 (31)
University of Calgary	211 (10)	200 (9)	204 (8)
Carleton University	781-790 (25)	501-600 (19-23)	616 (20)
Concordia University	465 (16)	601–800 (24–26)	755 (22)
Dalhousie University	283 (12)	351–400 (14–15)	385 (11)
University of Guelph	504 (18)	401-500 (16-18)	556 (18)
Université Laval	469 (17)	401-500 (16-18)	451 (16)
Lakehead University	—N/a	1001-1200 (29)	1372 (29)
Laurentian University	—N/a	—N/a	1759 (32)
University of Lethbridge	—N/a	1501+ (34)	2026 (36)
University of Manitoba	643 (21)	501-600 (19-23)	440 (15)
McGill University	27 (1)	41 (2)	62 (3)
McMaster University	173 (8)	116 (4)	146 (4)
Memorial University of Newfoundland	660 (22)	501-600 (19-23)	696 (21)
Université de Montréal	168 (7)	150 (6)	192 (6)
University of New Brunswick	622 (20)	601–800 (24–26)	919 (24)
University of Northern British Columbia	—N/a	1201-1500 (30-33)	—N/a
Ontario Tech University	—N/a	801-1000 (27–28)	1121 (T-27)
University of Ottawa	219 (11)	187 (8)	256 (9)
Université du Québec	851-900 (26)	501-600 (19-23)	(Note: Publication did not look at the Université du Québec system as a whole, but at its individual component institutions. The Université du Québec à Montréal was ranked 847 (23), École de technologie supérieure was ranked 1271 (28), and University of Quebec Trois Rivieres was ranked 1917 (33) in the U.S. News & World Report's ranking.)
Queen's University at Kingston	191 (9)	301-350 (11–13)	416 (13)
University of Regina	1001–1200 (28–30)	801-1000 (27–28)	979 (25)
University of Saskatchewan	378 (15)	351-400 (14-15)	568 (19)
Université de Sherbrooke	901-950 (27)	—N/a	789 (24)
Simon Fraser University	308 (13)	301-350 (11–13)	424 (14)
University of Toronto	29 (2)	21 (1)	16 (1)
Toronto Metropolitan University	711-720 (24)	601–800 (24–26)	1041 (26)
Trent University	—N/a	—N/a	1979 (35)
University of Victoria	358 (14)	301–350 (11–13)	394 (12)
University of Waterloo	119 (5)	162 (7)	197 (7)
Western University	151 (6)	201–250 (10)	314 (10)
Wilfrid Laurier University	—N/a	1201-1500 (30-33)	1507 (30)
University of Windsor	546 (19)	501-600 (19-23)	1125 (27)
Vancouver Island University	1001–1200 (28–30)	—N/a	—N/a
York University	333 (14)	401-500 (16-18)	514 (17)

=== Quantitative-based ===
Several institutions and publications have created university rankings whose methodologies rely only on quantitative measures. These rankings use quantitative measures to assess the quality of an institution, such as bibliometrics, or through the number of awards and distinctions accrued by a university's faculty and/or alumni. Quantitative international rankings include the Academic Ranking of World Universities, published by the Shanghai Ranking Consultancy; and the Center for World University Rankings.

Several institutions publish rankings that are primarily bibliometric, based on citation analysis. Biblometric rankings specifically evaluate the impact a university has on specialized journals and other academic publications. Bibliometrics is a field of statistics used to provide quantitative analysis of academic literature. Primarily bibliometric rankings include those; the Performance Ranking of Scientific Papers for World Universities, published by the National Taiwan University; and University Ranking by Academic Performance, published by the Middle East Technical University.

The following table includes Canadian universities, and their most recent global rank in the aforementioned publications (with national ranks in parentheses):

University	2025 Academic Ranking of World Universities	2025 Performance Ranking of Scientific Papers for World Universities	2024–25 University Ranking by Academic Performance	2025 Center for World University Rankings
University of Alberta	101-150 (4-5)	88 (4)	92 (4)	81 (4)
University of British Columbia	53 (2)	33 (2)	35 (2)	48 (3)
Brock University	800-901 (25)	—N/a	—N/a	1406 (32)
University of Calgary	151–200 (6–8)	136 (7)	135 (6)	202 (8)
Carleton University	501–600 (18–19)	651-700 (20–21)	578 (20)	558 (20)
Concordia University	601–700 (20–21)	701–750 (22–23)	589 (21)	620 (22)
Dalhousie University	301–400 (11–15)	346 (13)	332 (12)	353 (14)
École de technologie supérieure	—N/a	—N/a	—N/a	1188 (30)
Institut national de la recherche scientifique	—N/a	—N/a	—N/a	1023 (27)
University of Guelph	501–600 (18–19)	501–600 (19–20)	478 (17)	515 (19)
Lakehead University	—N/a	1101-1150 (29)	—N/a	1387 (31)
Laurentian University	—N/a	—N/a	2126 (41)	1847 (38)
Université Laval	301–400 (11–15)	291 (11)	286 (11)	305 (12)
University of Lethbridge	—N/a	—N/a	1931 (37)	1749 (36)
University of Manitoba	301–400 (11–15)	320 (12)	341 (14)	295 (11)
McGill University	76 (3)	50 (3)	60 (3)	27 (2)
McMaster University	101-150 (4-5)	124 (6)	137 (7)	186 (7)
Memorial University of Newfoundland	701–800 (22–24)	701–750 (22–23)	614 (22)	671 (23)
Polytechnique Montréal (Note: The institution is an engineering school affiliated to the Université de Montréal. Some publications rank Polytechnique Montréal separately from the larger institution it is affiliated with.)	—N/a	—N/a	964 (26)	—N/a
Université de Montréal	151–200 (6-8)	116 (5)	120 (5)	124 (5)
University of New Brunswick	901-1000 (26-28)	1051-1100 (28)	1021 (27)	1092 (29)
Ontario Tech University	901–1000 (25–26)	951-1000 (25-26)	2071 (39)	1802 (37)
University of Ottawa	201–300 (9–10)	144 (8)	158 (8)	212 (10)
Université du Québec à Montréal	701–800 (22–24)	951-1000 (24)	735 (24)	680 (24)
Université du Québec à Trois-Rivières	—N/a	—N/a	1669 (35)	1717 (34)
Queen's University at Kingston	201–300 (9–10)	374 (15)	334 (13)	333 (13)
University of Regina	901-1000 (26-28)	1001-1050 (27)	1116 (29)	1137 (29)
Saint Mary's University	—N/a	—N/a	—N/a	1887 (39)
University of Saskatchewan	401–500 (16–17)	474 (16)	373 (15)	418 (16)
University of Winnipeg	—N/a	—N/a	—N/a	1975 (40)
Université de Sherbrooke	701–800 (22–24)	651-700 (20–21)	652 (23)	601 (21)
Simon Fraser University	401–500 (16–17)	498 (18)	473 (16)	371 (15)
University of Toronto	25 (1)	4 (1)	3 (1)	23 (1)
Toronto Metropolitan University	901–1000 (25–26)	951-1000 (25-26)	773 (25)	850 (25)
Trent University	—N/a	—N/a	1971 (38)	1723 (35)
University of Victoria	301–400 (11–15)	483 (17)	488 (18)	439 (17)
University of Waterloo	151–200 (6–8)	207 (10)	179 (9)	211 (9)
University of Windsor	901-1000 (26-28)	—N/a	1065 (28)	1019 (26)
Western University	301–400 (11–15)	199 (9)	203 (10)	185 (6)
Wilfrid Laurier University	—N/a	—N/a	1497 (34)	1291 (30)
York University	601–700 (20–21)	551-600 (19-20)	531 (19)	490 (18)

=== Other metrics ===
Webometrics Ranking of World Universities is biannual university ranking produced by Cybermetrics Lab. The webometrics rankings use link analysis in an effort to evaluate the institution's overall web presence, and accessibility.

== National rankings ==
=== Opinion-based ===
A number of Canadian-based publications have ranked universities in Canada. The most prominent of which is Maclean's, a Toronto-based news magazine that has published an annual rankings of Canadian universities since 1991. In addition to the Maclean's ranking, there are other Canadian-based publications that also rank Canadian universities. In 2012, the Toronto-based Higher Education Strategy Associates published a study ranking Canadian Universities based on research strength. The study ranks Canadian Universities in two broad fields: Science and Engineering, and Social Sciences and Humanities.

A number of nationally based organizations have also crafted ranking using input from students and alumni. In 2014, the Toronto-based CampusRanking.ca began publication of its annual Canadian University and College Rankings, focusing on undergraduate education. The student-generated rankings asked over 40,000 undergraduate students and alumni to rate their schools. The survey was done across 135 schools in Canada. This data was used to develop a school matching quiz, MatchU, where students are matched to schools based on their personality type and school preferences. In February 2017, University Magazine, based in Windsor and Edmonton, started publishing its list of Top 10 universities in Canada. University Magazine surveyed undergraduate and graduate students at 96 Canadian universities, using this information to rank the universities

==== Maclean's ====
Maclean's publishes an annual ranking of Canadian universities, intended to measure a university's overall "undergraduate experience". Universities are split into three categories: medical/doctoral, comprehensive, and undergraduate. Maclean's evaluates post-secondary institutions on a number of performance factors, such as awards collected, resources, reputation, as well as student satisfaction surveys.

University of Windsor professor and co-author of The Marketing of Canadian University Rankings: A Misadventure Now 24 Years Old Stewart Page, had observed, in 2012, that numerous Canadian schools had withdrawn active cooperation from Maclean’s annual surveys.

In addition to the medical/doctoral, comprehensive, and undergraduate university categories, the magazine also produces rankings for that focus on grants awarded in groups of academic fields. The Maclean's ranking of "medical/doctoral universities" includes universities that are heavily research-based, and have a broad range of graduate-level programs. Universities placed within Maclean's comprehensive rankings includes universities with a significant degree of research activity and a wide range of programs at the undergraduate, graduate, and professional levels. Universities placed in their primarily undergraduate rankings features universities that are smaller in size and offer fewer graduate programs than universities found in other categories.

2023 Medical/Doctoral universities rankings
Rank	University
1	McGill University
2	University of Toronto
3	University of British Columbia
4	McMaster University
5	University of Alberta
6	University of Ottawa
7	Dalhousie University
8	Queen's University at Kingston
9	University of Calgary
10	Université de Montréal
=11	Université Laval
=11	Western University
=13	University of Saskatchewan
=13	University of Manitoba
15	Université de Sherbrooke

2023 Comprehensive universities rankings
Rank	University
1	Simon Fraser University
2	University of Victoria
3	University of Waterloo
4	University of Guelph
=5	Carleton University
=5	York University
7	Memorial University of Newfoundland
=8	University of New Brunswick
=8	Toronto Metropolitan University
=10	Wilfrid Laurier University
=10	Concordia University
12	Université du Québec à Montréal
13	Brock University
14	University of Windsor
15	University of Regina

2023 Primarily Undergraduate universities rankings
Rank	University
1	Mount Allison University
2	University of Northern British Columbia
3	Saint Mary's University
4	Trent University
=5	Acadia University
=5	Bishop's University
7	St. Francis Xavier University
8	University of Prince Edward Island
9	Ontario Tech University
10	Lakehead University
11	University of Lethbridge
12	Université de Moncton
13	University of Winnipeg
14	St. Thomas University
15	Laurentian University
16	Mount Saint Vincent University
17	Brandon University
18	Nipissing University
19	Cape Breton University

Maclean's medical/doctoral, comprehensive, and undergraduate annual rankings uses a number of performance factors to evaluate universities, including a reputational survey that accounts for 15 per cent of an institution's final score in the magazine's medical/doctoral, comprehensive, and undergraduate rankings. Respondents to the magazine's reputation survey includes university administrators and faculty, secondary school guidance counsellors, and members of the business community. In addition to using the information obtained from the reputational survey for its medical/comprehensive/undergraduate university rankings, Maclean's also publishes the results of the survey in the form of a reputational ranking. Maclean's reputational rankings rankgs institutions in several categories, including quality, innovation, and "leaders of tomorrow". The following are Maclean's overall reputational rankings:

2023 Maclean's overall reputation rankings
University	Rank
University of Toronto	1
University of Waterloo	2
University of British Columbia	3
McGill University	4
McMaster University	5
Queen's University at Kingston	6
University of Alberta	7
Université de Montréal	8
Simon Fraser University	9
University of Victoria	10
University of Calgary	11
University of Guelph	12
Western University	13
University of Ottawa	14
Dalhousie University	15
Université Laval	16
York University	17
Concordia University	18
Toronto Metropolitan University	19
Université de Sherbrooke	20
Carleton University	21
University of Saskatchewan	22
Wilfrid Laurier University	23
Memorial University of Newfoundland	24
University of Manitoba	25
Université du Québec à Montréal	26
Brock University	27
Mount Allison University	28
University of New Brunswick	29
Trent University	30
Ontario Tech University	31
University of Northern British Columbia	32
Acadia University	33
St. Francis Xavier University	34
University of Winnipeg	35
Saint Mary's University	36
University of Prince Edward Island	37
University of Lethbridge	38
University of Regina	39
Université de Moncton	40
University of Windsor	41
Bishop's University	42
Lakehead University	43
Brandon University	44
Mount Saint Vincent University	45
Cape Breton University	46
St. Thomas University	47
Nipissing University	48
Laurentian University	49

===== Criticism =====
Several Canadian institutions have been critical of Maclean's rankings, either frustrated with its process or its results. After Maclean's released the methodology it used in 1992, Memorial University of Newfoundland and Carleton University opted to not participate in Maclean's 1993 ranking in protest of it. In 1994, the vice-chancellor of McGill University, Bernard Shapiro, wrote a letter to Maclean's coordinating editor concerning the rankings.

Wide-scale withdrawals from participation in Maclean's rankings began in 1995, when 15 universities, primarily made up of francophone institutions from Quebec, as well as the University of Manitoba, Memorial University of Newfoundland, and Université de Moncton. opted to not participate in Maclean's survey. However, these universities continued to provide similar data to the ones requested by Maclean's to the Association of Universities and Colleges of Canada for comparison purposes.

Further opt-outs from several research universities began in 2005, after the University of Toronto opted to not participate in the survey that year. The University of Toronto's withdrawal from Maclean's rankings resulted in Maclean's utilizing freedom-of-information laws to obtain the data it needed to compile its rankings. In August 2006, the University of Alberta, University of British Columbia, University of Calgary, Dalhousie University, University of Lethbridge, University of Manitoba, McMaster University, Université de Montréal, University of Ottawa, Simon Fraser University, and the University of Toronto issued a joint letter stating they would not participate in Maclean's ranking survey or provide them with any data. The joint statement described the rankings as "over-simplified and arbitrary," and were critical of the low response rates for its reputation surveys. By the end of 2006, a total of 26 universities opted to not complete Maclean's questionnaire.

University of Alberta president Indira Samarasekera wrote that Maclean's initially filed a "Freedom of Information" request but that it was "too late" for the universities to respond. Samarasekera further stated, "Most of [the universities] had already posted the data online, and we directed Maclean's staff to our website. In instances where the magazine staff couldn't find data on our website, they chose to use the previous year's data." Beginning with its 2007 rankings, the magazine gathered information previously obtained from the questionnaires from third-party, or other official sources and reports.

In 2016, a team at University of Windsor published its analyses of Maclean’s Canadian universities ranking data of the previous 24 years, as The Marketing of Canadian University Rankings: A Misadventure Now 24 Years Old. The report offers a statistical findings summary, along with discussions regarding status quo as well as effects of the surveys on student welfare.

== See also ==
- Higher education in Canada
- College and university rankings
- List of universities in Canada
- Maple League of Universities
- U15 Group of Canadian Research Universities
