= Canada Research Chair =

Canadian university research professorships

Canada Research Chair (CRC) is a title given to select Canadian university research professors by the Canada Research Chairs Program. As of 2022, there were 2,285 supported research professorships (2000 regular ones, and 285 special appointments). Seventy Canadian universities are participating in the program.

Since CRC title holders are considered experts in their field, the news media often requests chair holders to comment on emerging topics. In 2016, an independent study found that holding a CRC title has a significant positive effect on scientific performance.

== Program goals ==
The Canada Research Chair program was established in 2000 as a part of the Government of Canada wanting to promote research and development excellence in Canadian post-secondary educational institutions. Through the Canada Research Chair program, $311 million is spent annually to attract and retain outstanding scholars and scientists.

The CRC program is part of a national strategy to make Canada one of the world's top countries in research and development. The program supports chair holders in achieving research excellence in natural sciences, engineering, health sciences, humanities, and social sciences, improve Canada's depth of knowledge and quality of life, strengthen the country's international competitiveness, and train personnel through student supervision, teaching, and the coordination of other researchers' work.

== Types of chairs ==
There are two types of Canada Research Chair:

- Tier 1 Chairs – tenable for seven years and renewable once (and twice in exceptional circumstances), are for outstanding researchers acknowledged by their peers as world leaders in their fields. Nominees for Tier 1 positions are full professors or associate professors who are expected to be promoted to the full professor level within one or two years of the nomination (or, if coming from outside the academic sector, nominees must possess the necessary qualifications to be appointed at these levels by the nominating university). For each Tier 1 Chair, the university receives $200,000 annually for seven years.
- Tier 2 Chairs – tenable for five years and renewable once, are for exceptional emerging researchers, acknowledged by their peers as having the potential to lead in their field. Nominees for Tier 2 positions are assistant or associate professors (or they possess the necessary qualifications to be appointed at these levels by the nominating university). For each Tier 2 Chair, the university receives $100,000 annually for five years.

The money received for each chair can be used to add to the chair's salary, to help pay for the chair's existing salary, or to fund research; the proportion allocated to each category varies by university.

== Chair allocations ==
The number of CRCs allocated to a university is proportional to the amount of research grant funding that university has received in the three years prior to the year of the allocation. Grant funding must originate from the three federal granting agencies (NSERC, CIHR, and SSHRC).

Of the total 2000 Chairs, 1880 are regular allocations, distributed as follows:

- 733 Chairs (39 per cent) for research in natural sciences and engineering;
- 733 Chairs (39 per cent) for research in health sciences;
- 414 Chairs (22 per cent) for research in social sciences and humanities.

The program sets aside a special allocation of 120 Chairs for universities that have received one per cent or less of the total funding paid out by the three federal granting agencies over the preceding three years.

Roughly 66% of Chairs are allocated to member institutions of the U15, a group of the top research-intensive universities in Canada.

Indicates membership in the U15

Institution	Province	# of Chairholders
University of Toronto	Ontario	238
University of British Columbia	British Columbia	167
McGill University	Québec	147
Université de Montréal	Québec	98
University of Alberta	Alberta	111
University of Calgary	Alberta	77
Université Laval	Québec	74
McMaster University	Ontario	69
University of Western Ontario	Ontario	64
Queen's University	Ontario	44
University of Manitoba	Manitoba	46
University of Ottawa	Ontario	64
University of Saskatchewan	Saskatchewan	29
University of Waterloo	Ontario	55
Dalhousie University	Nova Scotia	40
Acadia University	Nova Scotia	3
Algoma University	Ontario	1
Athabasca University	Alberta	2
Bishop's University	Québec	5
Brandon University	Manitoba	5
British Columbia Institute of Technology	British Columbia	3
Brock University	Ontario	13
Cape Breton University	Nova Scotia	2
Carleton University	Ontario	32
Concordia University	Québec	23
Concordia University College of Alberta	Alberta	1
École de technologie supérieure	Québec	7
Emily Carr University of Art and Design	British Columbia	3
HEC Montréal	Québec	6
Institut national de la recherche scientifique	Québec	13
Kwantlen Polytechnic University	British Columbia	1
Lakehead University	Ontario	12
Laurentian University	Ontario	10
MacEwan University	Alberta	4
Memorial University of Newfoundland	Newfoundland and Labrador	13
Mount Allison University	New Brunswick	4
Mount Royal University	Alberta	1
Mount Saint Vincent University	Nova Scotia	4
Nipissing University	Ontario	4
Nova Scotia College of Art and Design	Nova Scotia	2
OCAD University	Ontario	1
Polytechnique Montréal	Québec	26
Royal Military College of Canada	Ontario	5
Royal Roads University	British Columbia	4
Toronto Metropolitan University	Ontario	11
Saint Mary's University	Nova Scotia	7
Simon Fraser University	British Columbia	37
St. Francis Xavier University	Nova Scotia	5
St. Thomas University	New Brunswick	4
The King's University	Alberta	2
Thompson Rivers University	British Columbia	6
Trent University	Ontario	8
Trinity Western University	British Columbia	2
Université de Moncton	New Brunswick	5
Université de Saint-Boniface	Manitoba	1
Université de Sherbrooke	Québec	38
Université TÉLUQ (Télé-université, Université du Québec)	Québec	1
Université du Québec à Montréal	Québec	23
Université du Québec en Outaouais	Québec	1
University of Guelph	Ontario	34
University of Lethbridge	Alberta	9
University of New Brunswick	New Brunswick	14
University of Northern British Columbia	British Columbia	8
University of Ontario Institute of Technology	Ontario	5
University of Prince Edward Island	Prince Edward Island	7
University of Regina	Saskatchewan	10
University of Victoria	British Columbia	41
University of Windsor	Ontario	14
University of Winnipeg	Manitoba	6
Vancouver Island University	British Columbia	4
Wilfrid Laurier University	Ontario	9
York University	Ontario	24

=== List of Canada Research Chairs ===
The Canada Research Chairs Program maintains an online database of profiles of each chair holder, which include detailed descriptions of each of their research projects.

=== Canada Research Chairs insignia ===
On March 27, 2008, the Government of Canada's Ministry of Industry, as well as the presidents of the Social Sciences and Humanities Research Council of Canada, the Canada Foundation for Innovation, the Natural Sciences and Engineering Research Council and the Canadian Institutes of Health Research presented each chair holder with a Canada Research Chair insignia at a national celebration of the program held at the Université du Québec en Outaouais in Gatineau, Quebec. The lapel pin, made of sterling silver, symbolizes the pursuit of knowledge and research excellence and is available exclusively to chair holders.
