= U15 Canada =

Association of Canadian universities

- Formation: 1991; 35 years ago
- Type: Higher education association
- Headquarters: Constitution Square, Ottawa
- Location: Canada
- Members: 15 universities: Dalhousie University, McGill University, McMaster University, Queen's University, University of Alberta, University of British Columbia, University of Calgary, University of Manitoba, University of Ottawa, University of Saskatchewan, University of Toronto, University of Waterloo, University of Western Ontario, Université de Montréal, Université Laval
- Official languages: English; French
- Chair: Daniel Jutras
- Chief executive officer: Robert Asselin
- Website: u15.ca

U15 Canada (U15 Group of Canadian Research Universities, Canadian French: U15 – Regroupement des universités de recherche du Canada) is an association of 15 Canadian public research-intensive universities. It is headquartered in Ottawa and was established during 1991 to represent its members' interests, primarily to provincial and federal governments, concerning the research enterprise and government programs supporting research and development.

Its member institutions undertake 80 per cent of all university research in Canada, and represent a research enterprise valued at more than CA$5 billion annually. Together, they contribute upwards of CA$36 billion to the Canadian economy every year, and produce more than 70% of all doctorates awarded in Canada.

== History ==
The core of U15 Canada began when executive heads of five universities in Ontario—McMaster University, Queen's University, University of Toronto, University of Waterloo and the University of Western Ontario—began to meet informally to consider mutual interests. This group of five Ontario-based universities formed an association in the mid-1980s to advance the interests of their research-intensive institutions. By 1989, vice-presidents from other Canadian universities had joined the initial group. After a meeting at the University of British Columbia, they agreed to meet twice annually to share common concerns. In 1991, the universities formed a Group of Ten, made up of the original five Ontario universities, along with McGill University, University of Alberta, University of British Columbia, Université de Montréal, and Université Laval.

The group has since expanded twice, once in 2006, and again in 2011. In 2006, the group expanded to include Dalhousie University, University of Calgary, and the University of Ottawa, becoming the Group of Thirteen. In 2011, the group grew to its current size and membership with the addition of the University of Manitoba and the University of Saskatchewan. The group was reorganized and renamed as the U15. In 2012, the executive heads created a U15 Canada Directorate and appointed the organization's first executive director.

== Organization ==
The executive heads of the member universities govern U15 Canada, supported by their respective chief academic officers and vice-presidents of research. The executive organ of the group is the executive committee, made up of the Chair and two Vice-Chairs. Through a process of peer nomination, U15 Canada members appoint a Chair to lead the governing body. The committee is charged with acting on behalf of U15 Canada members concerning operational matters related to the Secretariat. The current Chair is Daniel Jutras, who is the rector of the Université de Montréal.

In addition, U15 Canada's executive committee operates a number of sub-committees that assist the administration in its operations. The Academic Affairs Committee advances collaborative initiatives and attempts to maximize cooperation among the member institutions. The Research Committee attempts to advance the research agenda of its member institutions. The Data Exchange Steering Committee is charged with setting the priorities and recommending annual work plans for research data specialists at member universities.

Chair of the Board	University	Term of Office
Amit Chakma	Western	2012–2014
Feridun Hamdullahpur	Waterloo	2014–2016
Guy Breton	Montréal	2016–2018
Meric Gertler	Toronto	2018–2020
Santa Ono	UBC	2020–2022
Peter Stoicheff	Saskatchewan	2022–2025
Daniel Jutras	Montréal	2025–present

Chief Executive Officer	Term in Office
Suzanne Corbeil	2012–2017
Gilles G. Patry	2017–2022
Chad Gaffield	2022–2025
Robert Asselin	2025–present

== Membership ==
U15 Canada currently has 15 members, of which six are from Ontario, three from Quebec, two from Alberta, and one each from British Columbia, Manitoba, Nova Scotia and Saskatchewan. Seven of the thirteen provinces and territories of Canada are represented in the group. Three of the six Ontario-based U15 universities are located within the Greater Golden Horseshoe, and two of them are in Eastern Ontario. Meanwhile, two of the three Quebec-based universities are located in the City of Montreal.

Collectively, the members of U15 Canada represent 47 per cent of all university students in Canada, 71 per cent of all full-time doctoral students in the country, 87 per cent of all contracted private-sector research in Canada, and 80 per cent of all patents and start-ups in Canada. As a group, U15 Canada universities attract C$5.3 billion in annual research income, notably holding 80 per cent of all competitively allocated research funding in Canada.

Institution	City	Province	Students (Note: Based on the AUCC's 2017 full-time and part-time enrolment figures.)	Established (Note: The following is the year when the institution was established, not when the institution became a university with the authority to grant academic degrees.)	Joined	Sponsored research income (Note: Sponsored research income for the 2021 fiscal year. Figures are in Canadian dollars. Data was obtained from Statistics Canada through Research Infosource)
University of Alberta	Edmonton	Alberta	38,820	1908	1991	$554,133,000
University of British Columbia	Vancouver	British Columbia	60,560	1908	1991	$726,838,000
University of Calgary	Calgary	Alberta	32,710	1966	2006	$504,480,000
Dalhousie University	Halifax	Nova Scotia	18,940	1818	2006	$183,746,000
Université Laval	Quebec City	Quebec	43,560	1663	1991	$515,077,000
University of Manitoba	Winnipeg	Manitoba	28,870 (Note: Figure includes students from all campuses, colleges, and institutions.)	1877	2011	$231,904,000
McGill University	Montreal	Quebec	38,580	1821	1991	$687,413,000
McMaster University	Hamilton	Ontario	32,600	1887	1991	$374,609,000
Université de Montréal	Montreal	Quebec	48,330	1878	1991	$682,309,000
University of Ottawa	Ottawa	Ontario	42,200	1848	2006	$432,676,000
Queen's University at Kingston	Kingston	Ontario	28,140	1841	1991	$227,337,000
University of Saskatchewan	Saskatoon	Saskatchewan	26,694	1907	2011	$285,434,000
University of Toronto	Toronto	Ontario	99,794	1827	1991	$1,461,571,000
University of Waterloo	Waterloo	Ontario	39,200	1956	1991	$221,029,000
University of Western Ontario	London	Ontario	32,500 (Note: Figure excludes students from affiliated colleges and institutions.)	1878	1991	$264,426,000

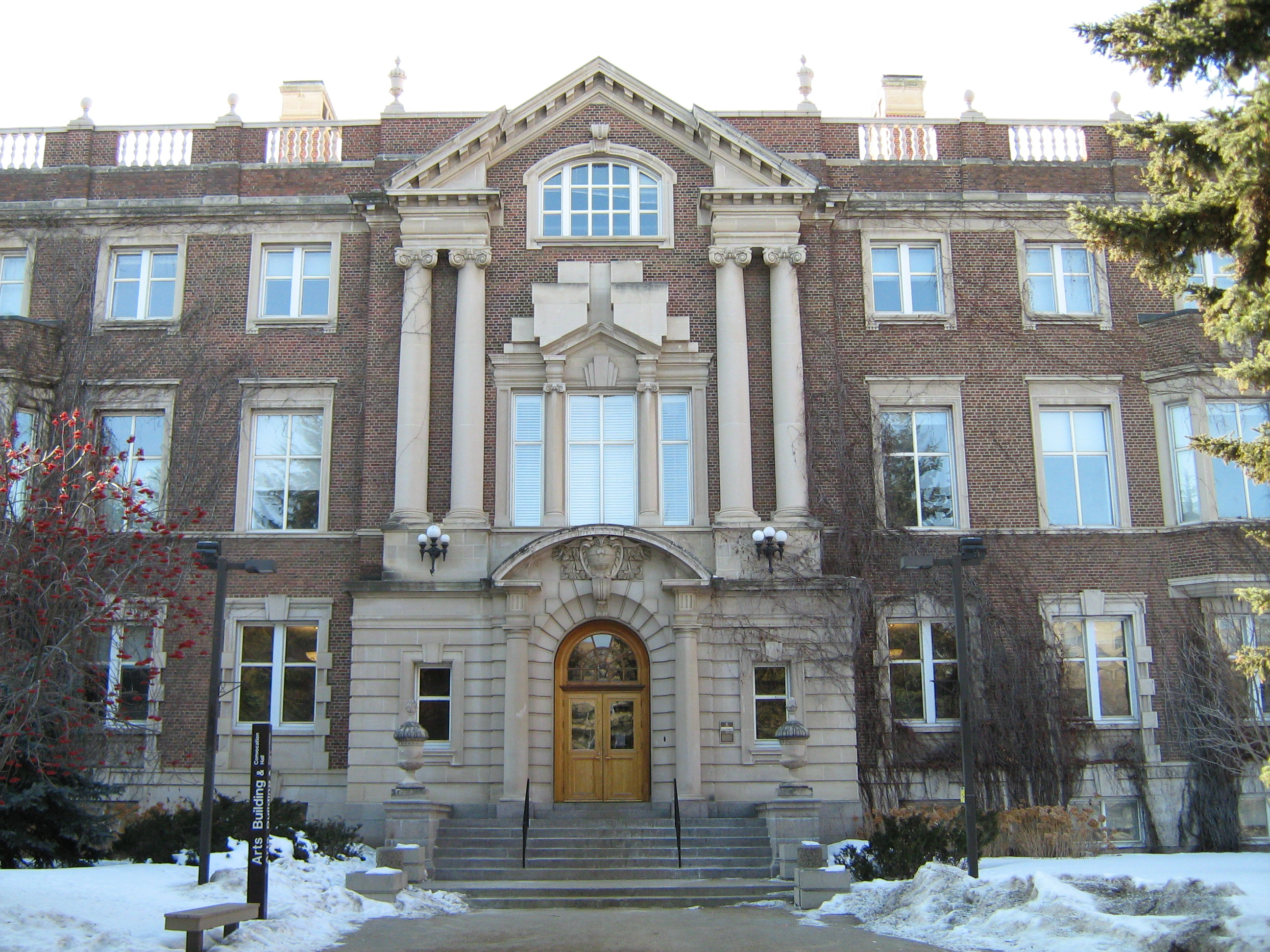
Alberta

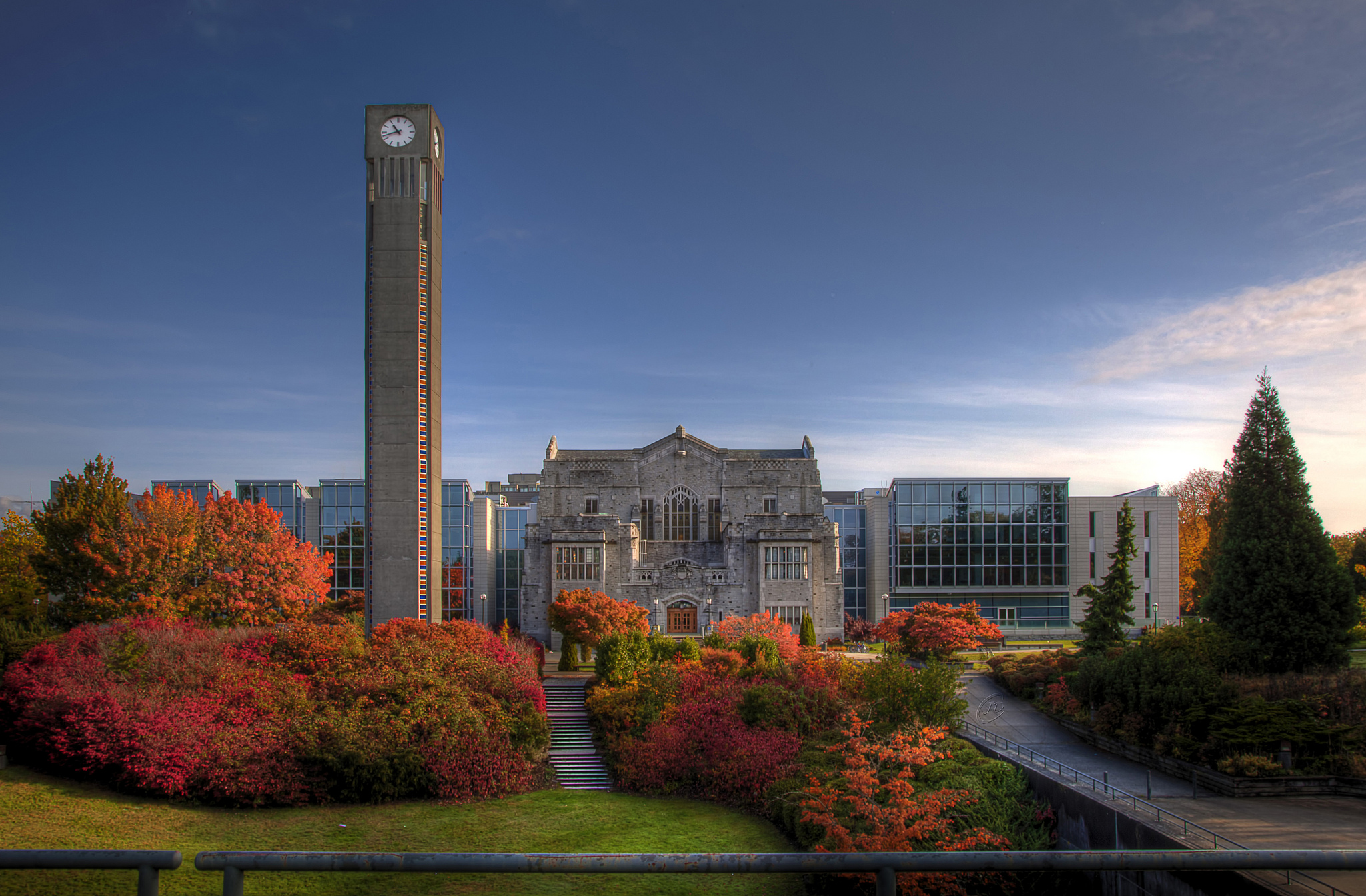
UBC

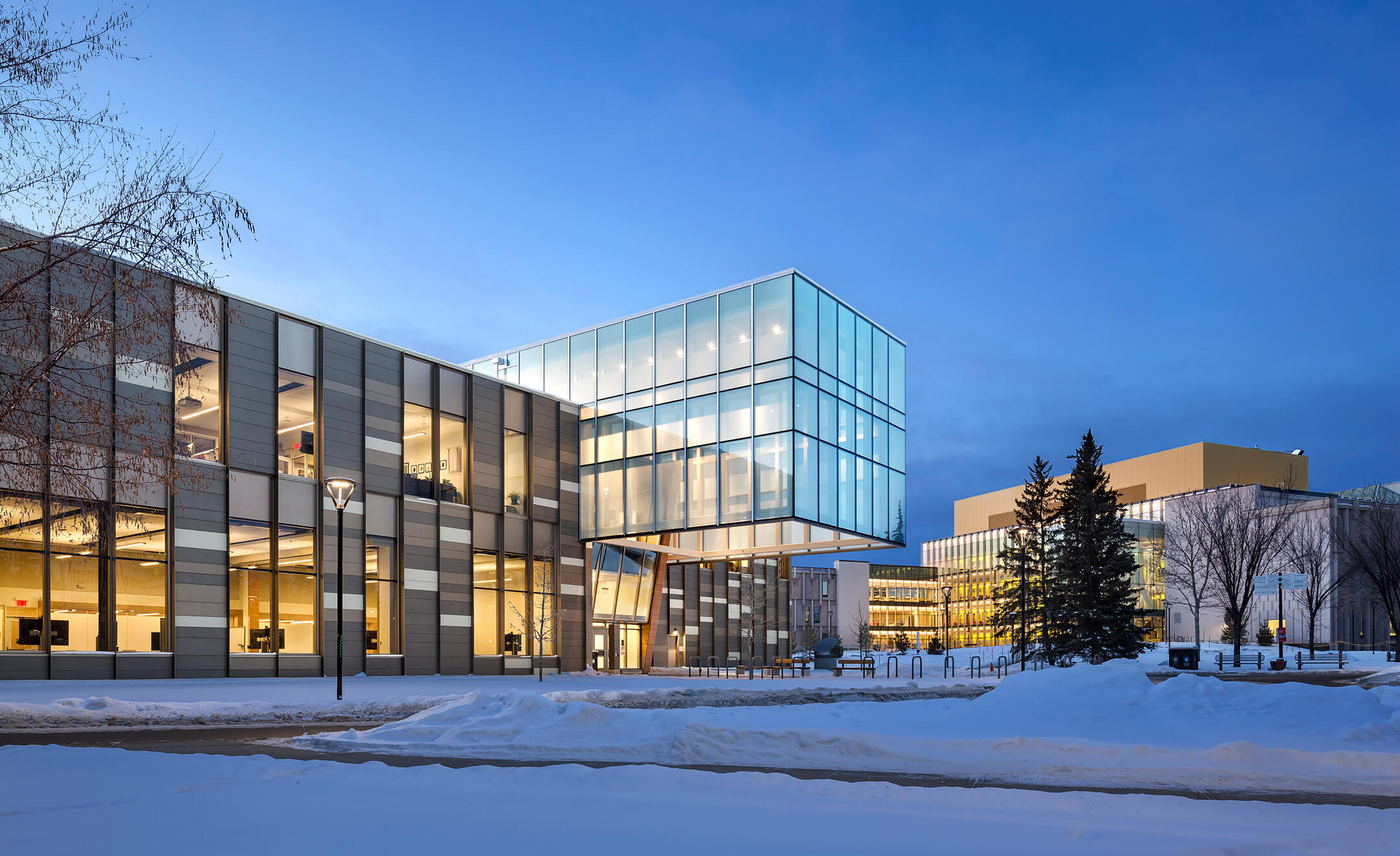
Calgary

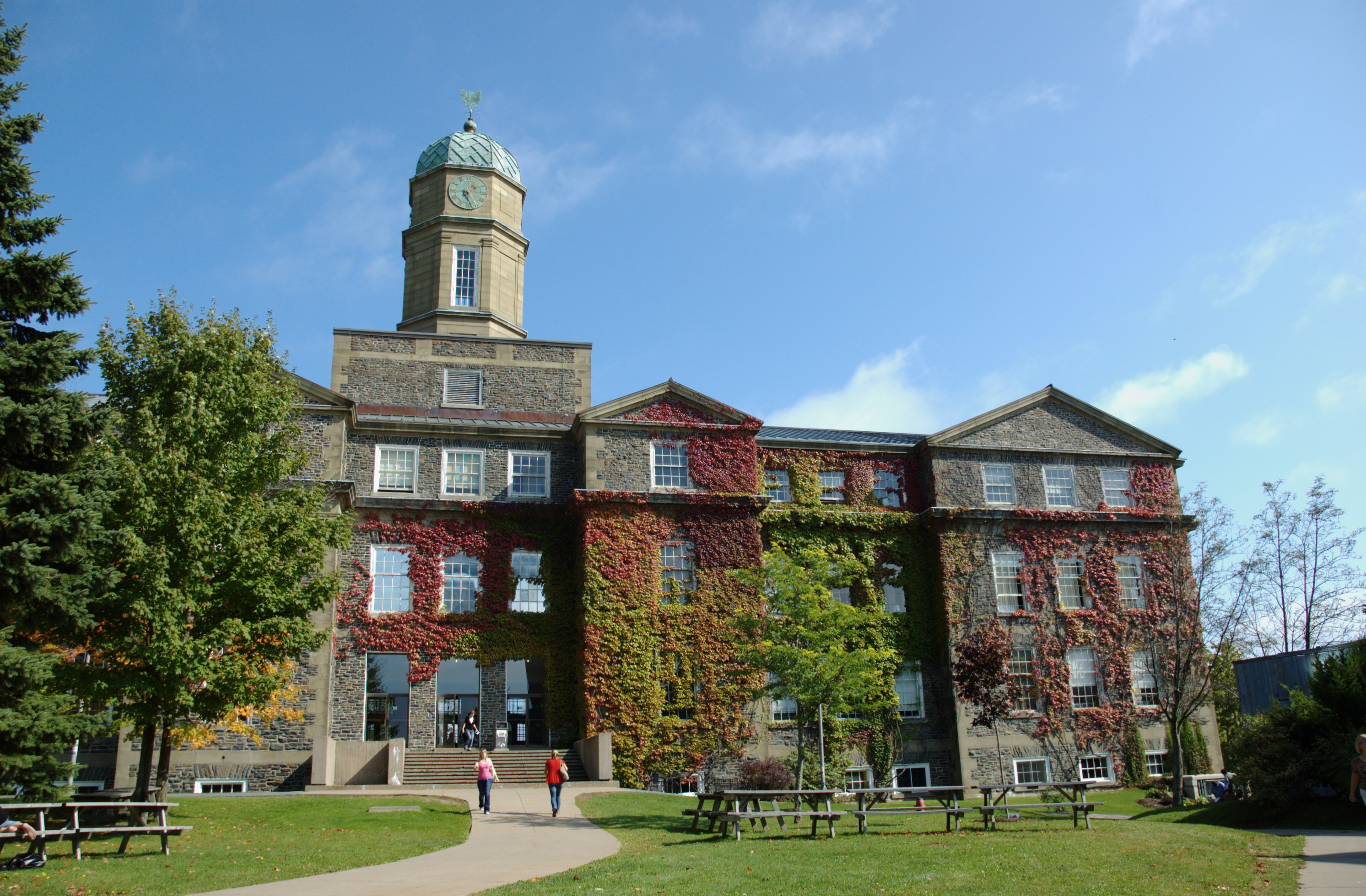
Dalhousie

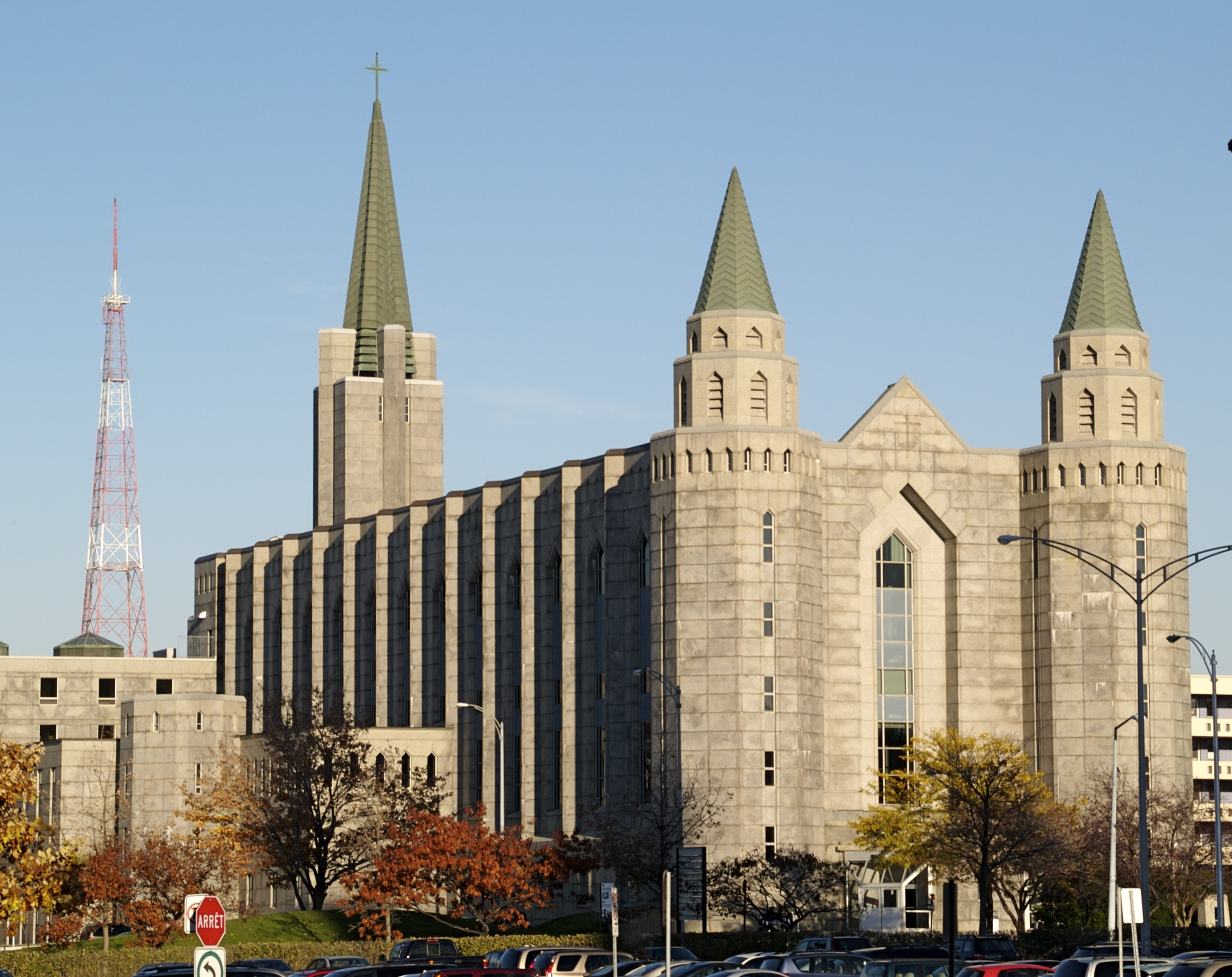
Laval

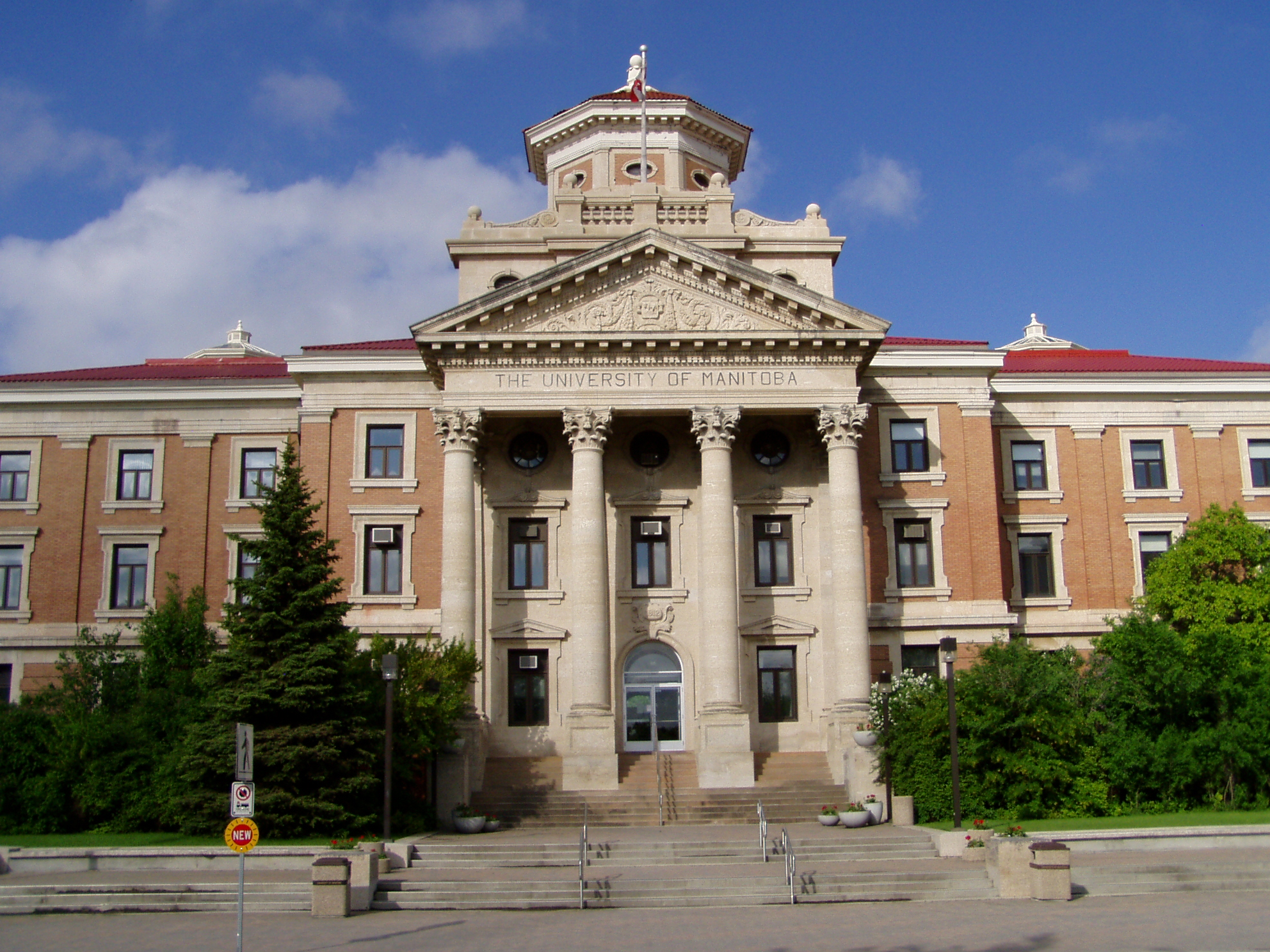
Manitoba

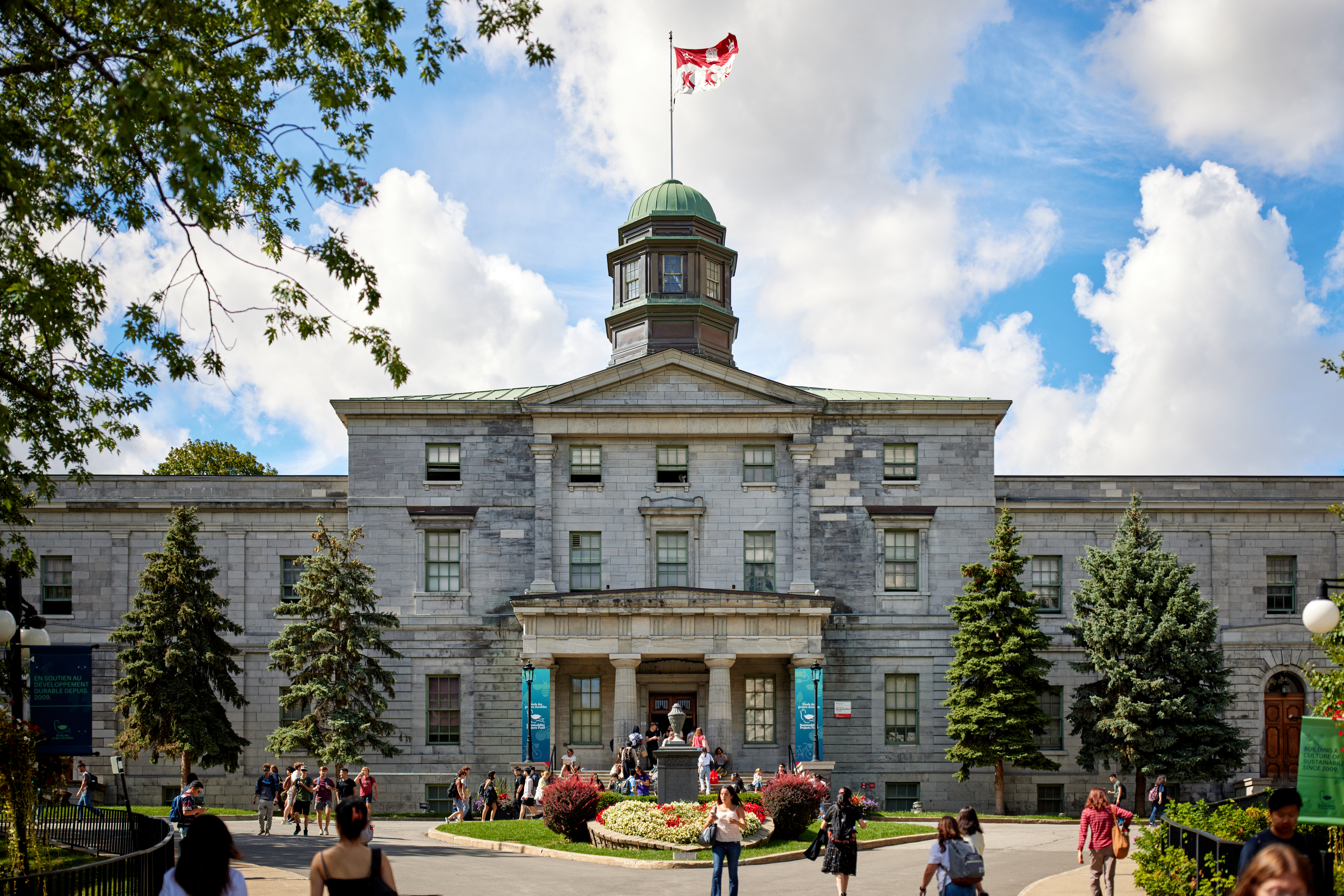
McGill

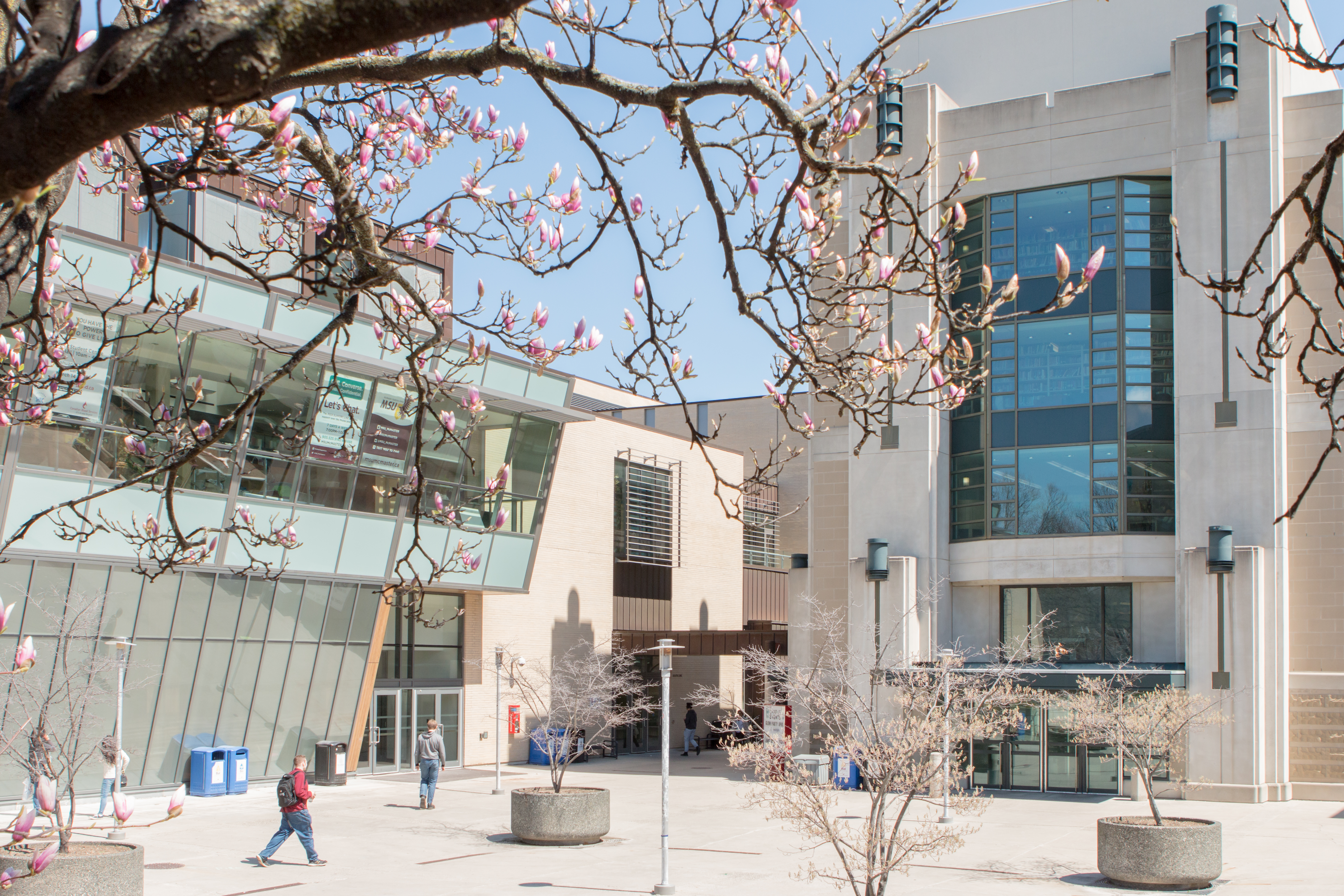
McMaster

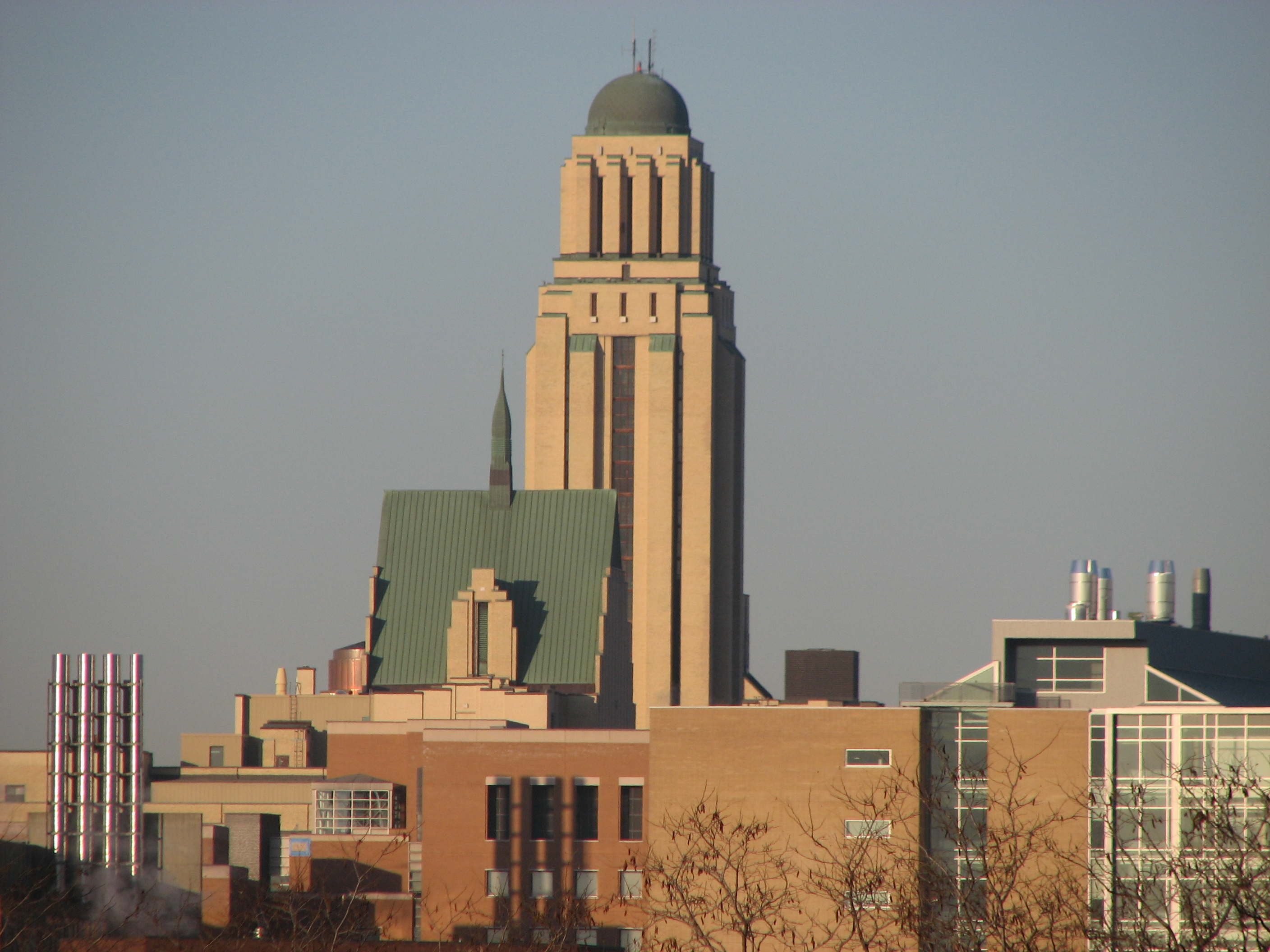
Montréal

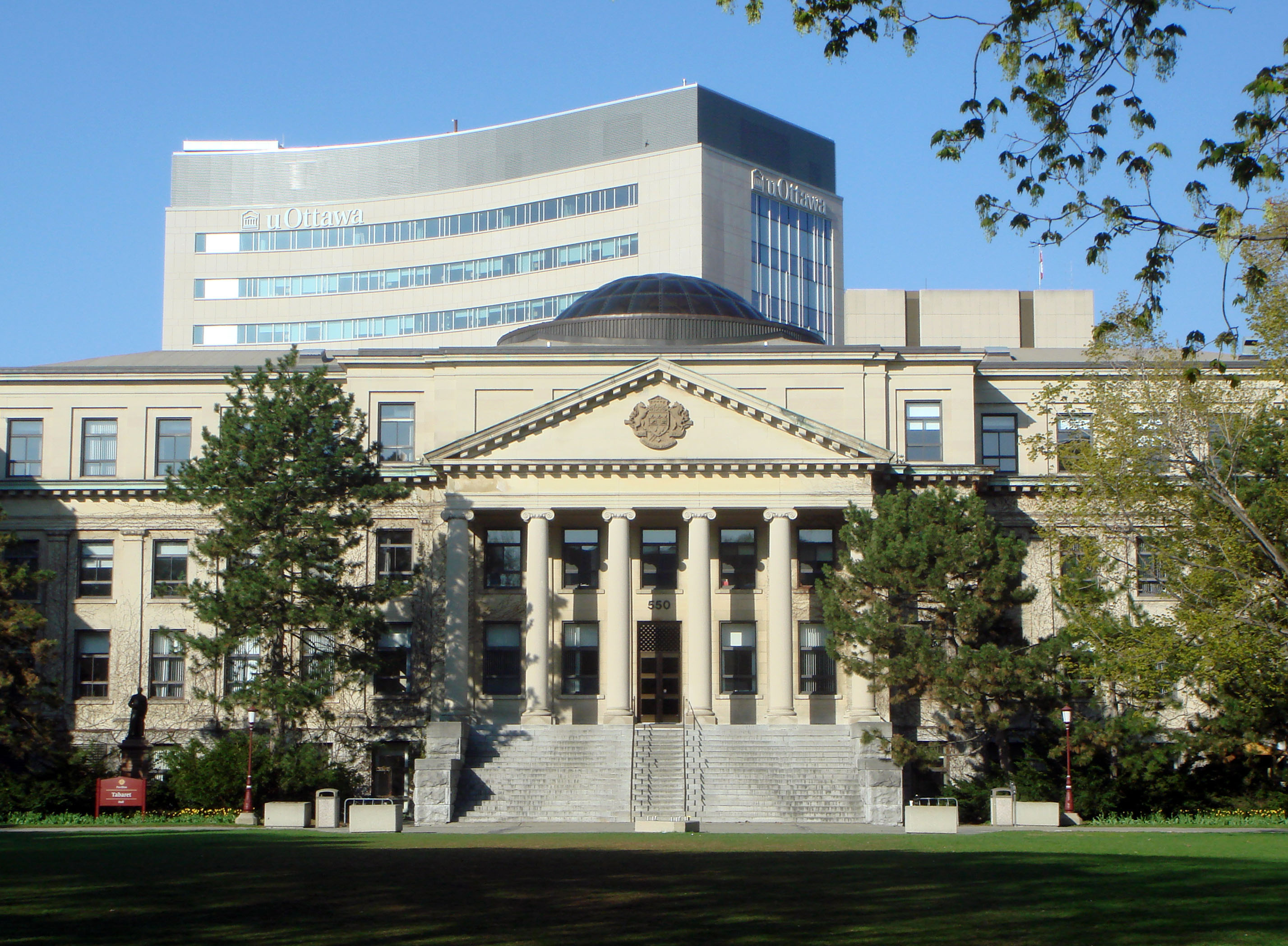
Ottawa

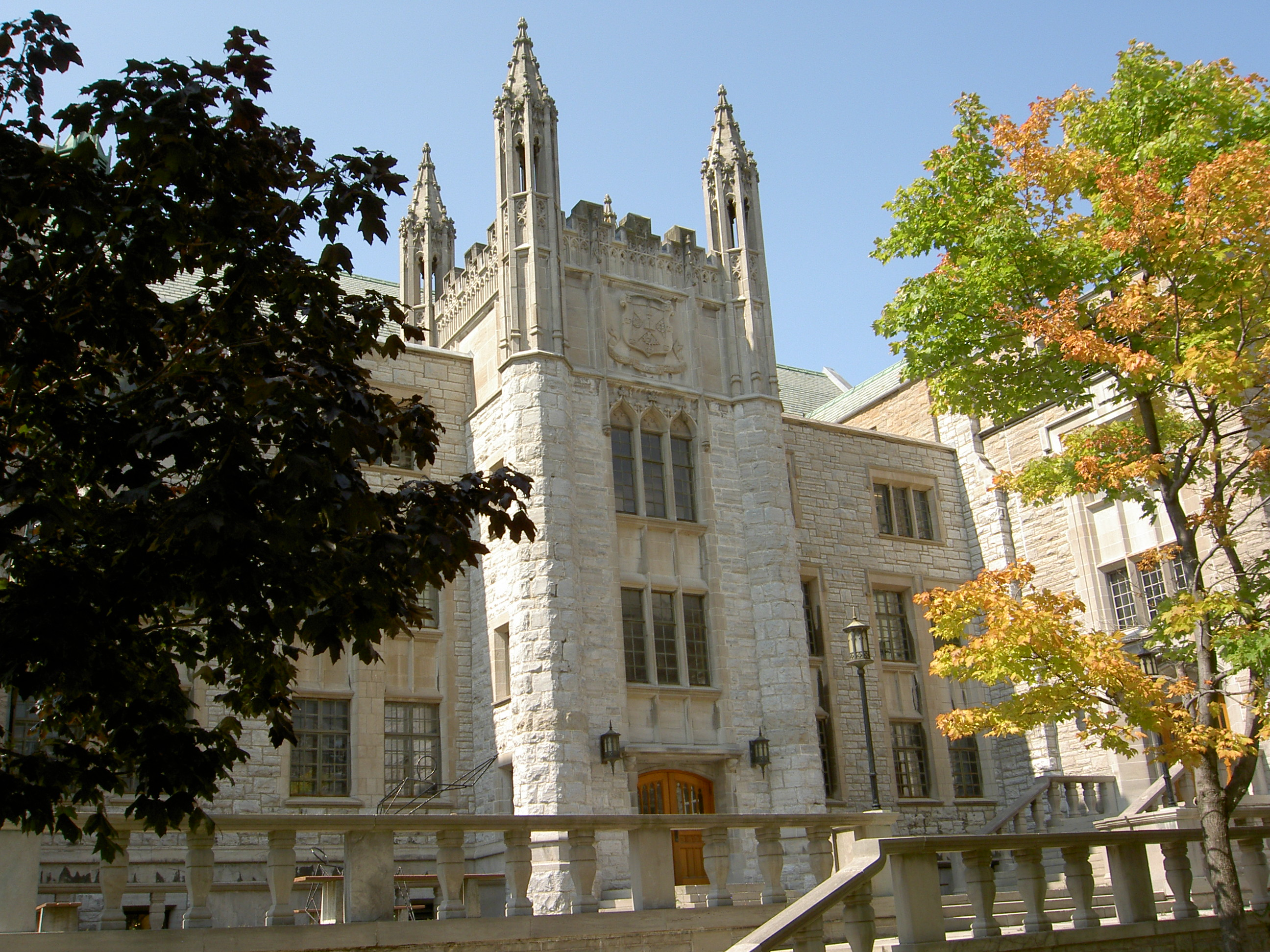
Queen's

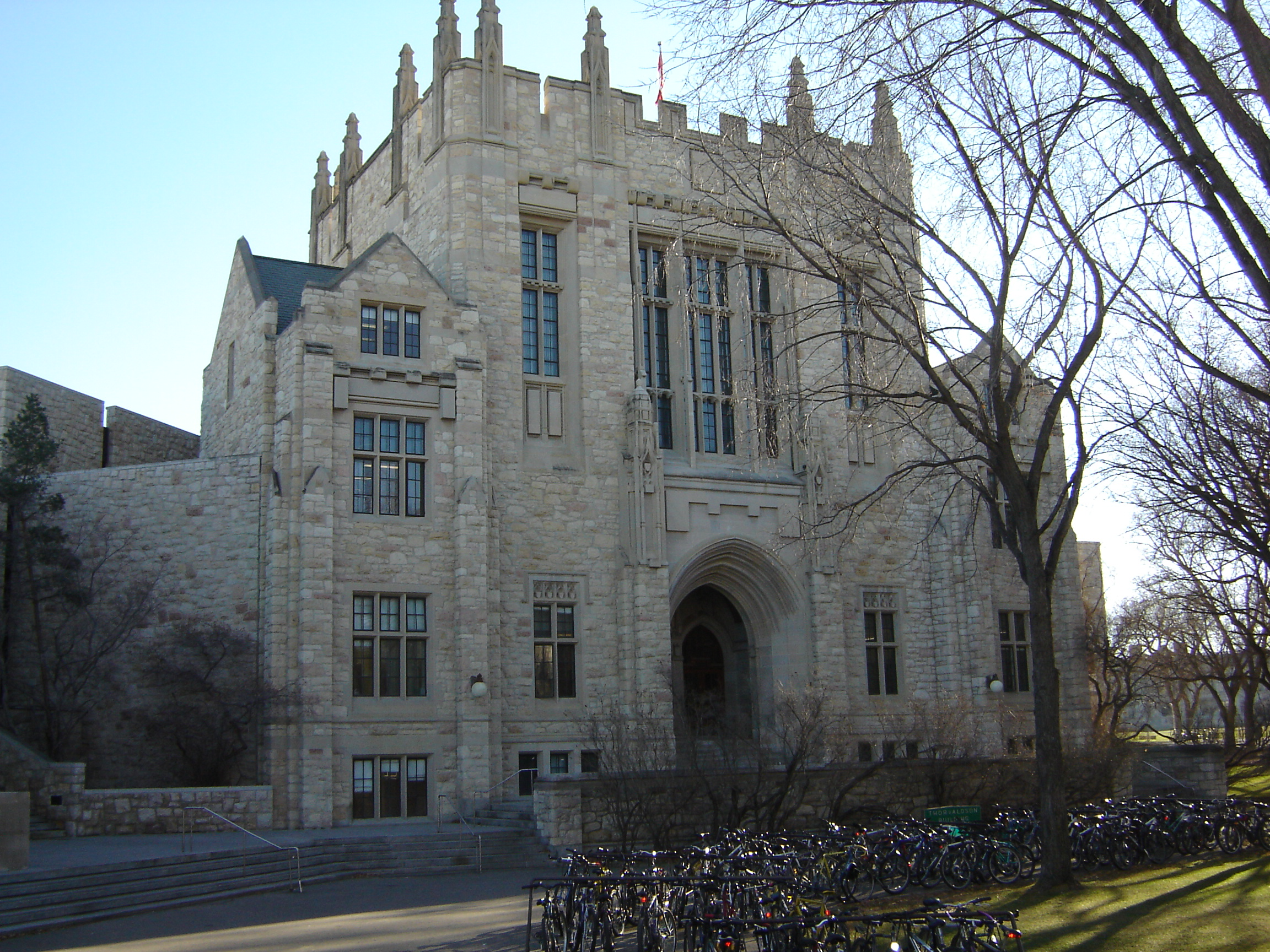
Saskatchewan

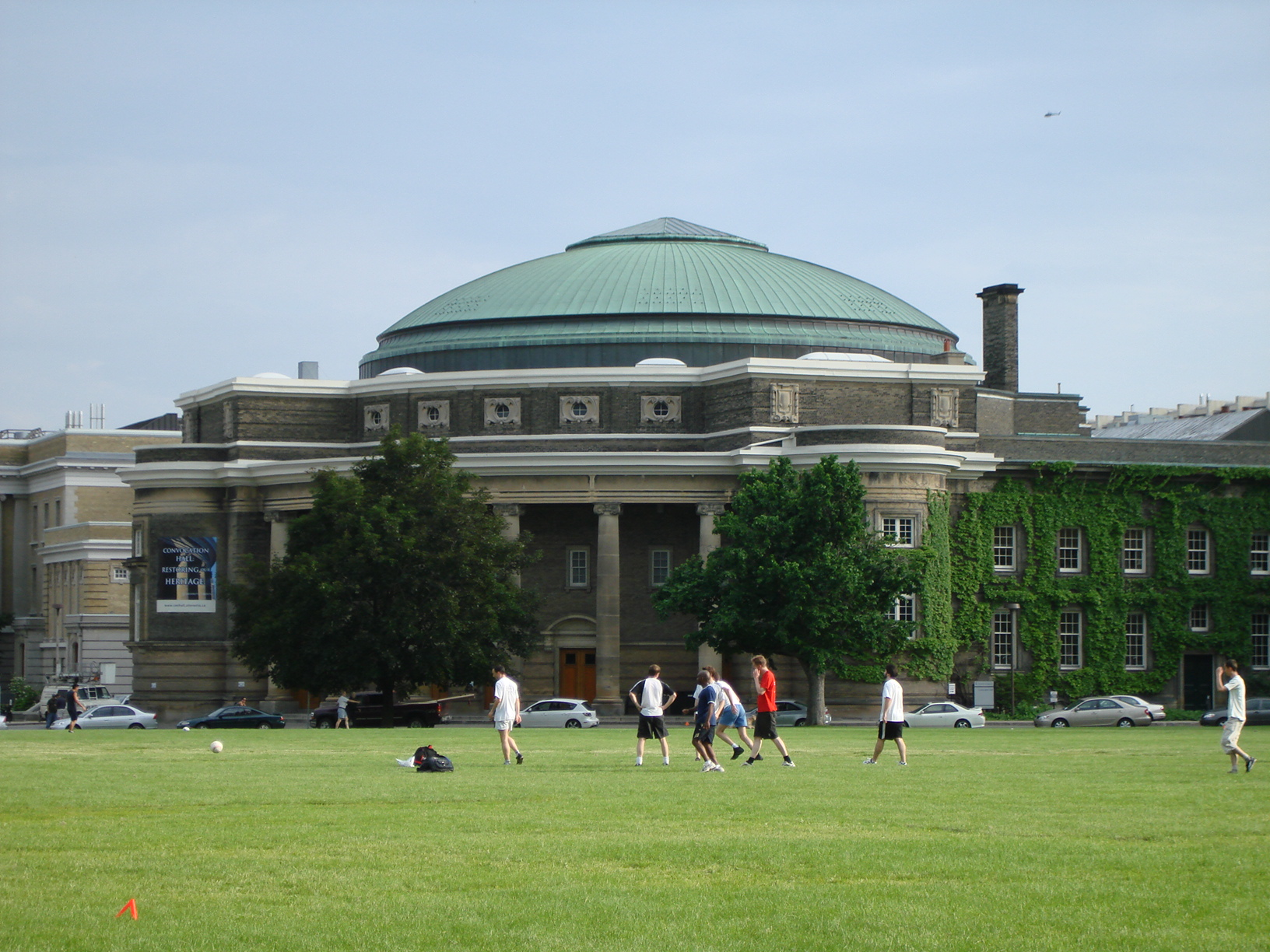
Toronto

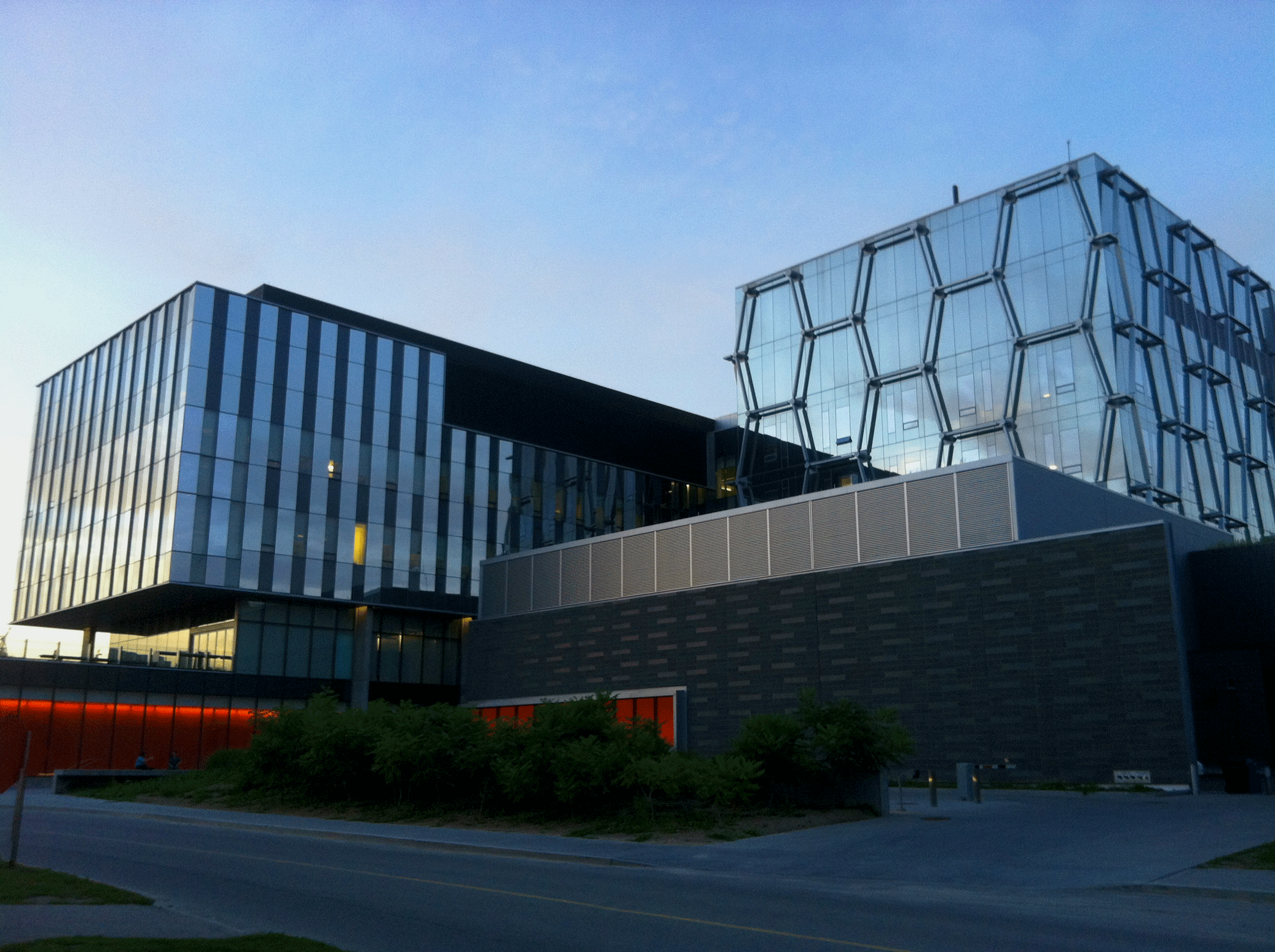
Waterloo

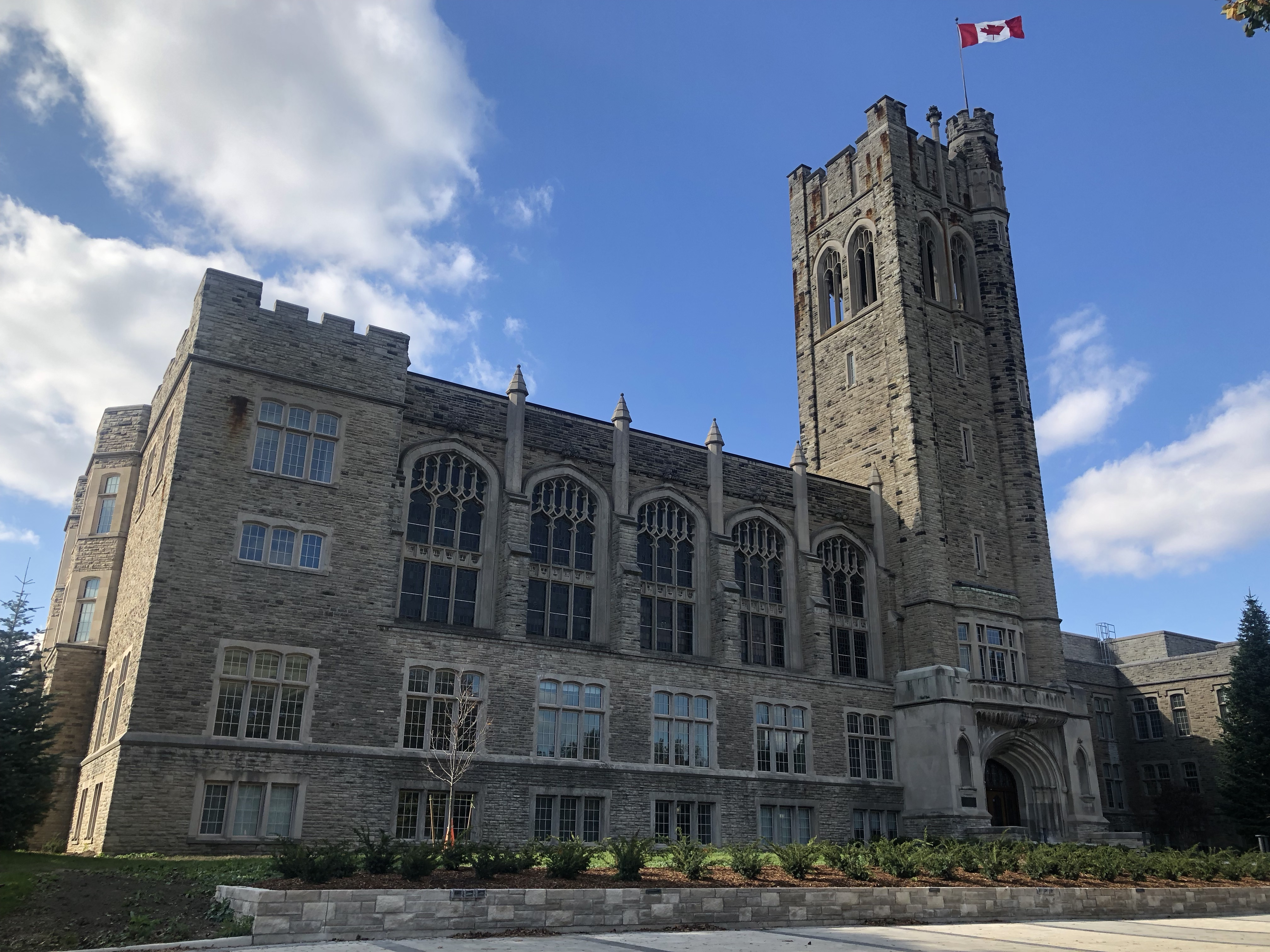
Western

=== Locations ===
Locations of U15 Group universities

== See also ==
- Canadian university scientific research organizations
- Maple League of Universities
- Higher education in Canada
- List of universities in Canada
- List of higher education associations and alliances
- List of higher education associations and organizations in Canada
- ORION (research and education network)
- Rankings of universities in Canada
