= List of higher education associations and organizations in Canada =

This is a list of higher education associations and organizations in Canada. These are groups relevant to the structure of higher education in Canada. It includes those that support teachers, staff, students, institutions, research, and related groups involved in the delivery of higher education in the Canadian provinces and territories.

== Universities Canada (UnivCan) ==
Formed in 1911, as the Association of Universities and Colleges of Canada (AUCC), it represents 97 public and private not-for-profit Canadian universities and university colleges in Canada. It provides member services in public policy and advocacy, communications, research and information-sharing, and scholarships and international programs. UnivCan also provides data and statistics on Canadian universities to the general public. In April 2015, the organization renamed itself "Universities Canada". The association's business is conducted by a 13-member board of directors, made up of 12 university presidents and the president of UnivCan.

=== Business Schools Association of Canada (BSAC) ===
The Business Schools Association of Canada (BSAC), established in 1957 as the Association of Canadian Schools of Commerce and Business Administration, aims to enhance and promote higher education in management. The organization evolved through several phases to focus on promoting management education and collaboration amongst university business schools. In 2020, it adopted the name Business Schools Association of Canada to reflect its growth, and in 2022, established a research fund to support management education initiatives. BSAC is an independent membership organizations serving public and private not-for-profit, currently gathering 66 of Canada’s leading university business schools and faculties of management. The association is an associate member of Universities Canada and has reciprocal membership with several national and international networks or organizations such as AACSB, CPA Canada, EFMD, FIBAA, GMAC, etc.

== Federal associations and organizations ==
=== Canadian Association of College & University Student Services (CACUSS) ===
The Canadian Association of College and University Student Services (CACUSS) is a professional association representing and serving those individuals who work in Canadian post-secondary institutions in student affairs and services. CACUSS is a comprehensive organization consisting of six divisions: Canadian Academic Integrity and Student Judicial Affairs (CAISJA); the Canadian Association of Disability Service Providers in Post Secondary Education (CADSPPE); the Canadian Organization of University and College Health (COUCH); the Canadian University and College Counselling Association (CUCCA); the National Aboriginal Student Services Association (NASSA); and the Student Affairs and Services Association (SASA). Since 1973, CACUSS has provided professional development services and programs for members in all the Canadian provinces.

=== Canadian Association of University Teachers (CAUT) ===
Over 65,000 teachers, librarians, researchers and other academic professionals and general staff at 120 colleges and universities throughout Canada are represented by the Canadian Association of University Teachers, a federation of independent associations and trade unions. Operating since 1951, CAUT offers courses, workshops and conferences to advance the social and economic interests of its members and works to improve the quality and accessibility of higher education.

=== Canadian Bureau for International Education ===
The Canadian Bureau for International Education has worked since 1966 to promote Canada's international relations through international education. CBIE administers a range of awards to Canadian students studying abroad and to foreign students studying in Canada.

=== Canadian Federation for the Humanities and Social Sciences ===
The Canadian Federation for the Humanities and Social Sciences, known as the Federation, is a member based organization and the national voice for researchers in the humanities and social sciences in Canada. It is a non-profit charitable organization that represents more than 85,000 researchers in 81 scholarly associations, 80 universities and colleges, and 6 affiliates across the country.

=== Colleges and Institutes Canada (CICan) ===
Colleges and Institutes Canada (formerly the Association of Canadian Community Colleges) is a national organization that was created in 1972 composed of voluntary members who provide representation in Canada as well as abroad to government, business and industry. It also facilitates networking and participation in programs for board members, staff and students of institutions of higher learning.

=== Council of Ministers of Education, Canada (CMEC) ===
The Council of Ministers of Education, Canada was founded in 1967 to provide leadership in education at the pan-Canadian and international levels and contributes to the fulfillment of the constitutional responsibility for education conferred on provinces and territories. Post-secondary education is an important element of CMEC's mandate to coordinate activities and projects that are of collective priority and interest to the provinces and territories.

=== National Association of Career Colleges (NACC) ===
Established in 1896, the National Association of Career Colleges is the oldest higher education association in Canada. It has approximately 500 member campuses from coast to coast. NACC acts as an umbrella organization for its affiliated provincial career college associations.

=== Polytechnics Canada ===
Polytechnics Canada is a cooperative association between the eleven leading research-intensive, publicly funded colleges and institutes of technology. The members of the association are degree-granting and industry-responsive post-secondary education institutions committed to education, training, and applied research for industry. They are located in Canada’s key economic regions of southern Ontario and western Canada. In 2009/2010, the association's nine members engaged over 4,500 students in applied research activities, undertook more than 350 research projects with industry partners and developed some 125 prototypes for various clients.

=== U15 Group of Canadian Research Universities ===
The U15 Group of Canadian Research Universities, formed in 1991, represents Canada's fifteen most research-intensive schools. Together, they conduct about 87% of all contracted private-sector research. They hold 80% of university patents and start-ups and 81% of university technology licenses, and receive 80% of all competitively allocated research funding. Lastly, 71% of full-time doctoral students study at U15 universities.

== Associations studying higher education ==
=== Canadian Society for the Study of Higher Education (CSSHE) ===
The Canadian Society for the Study of Higher Education was founded in 1970 to create an avenue for post-secondary researchers to communicate more effectively through comprehensive programs and partnerships to focus on the creation, publication, dissemination and application of information and research on post-secondary education in Canada.

=== Society for Teaching and Learning in Higher Education (STLHE) ===
The Society for Teaching and Learning in Higher Education, formed in 1981, is an association of academics that look at teaching and learning in higher education and work towards its betterment. Its members are faculty as well as teaching and resource professionals from post-secondary institutions from across Canada as well as abroad. From its initial 48 founding members, STLHE has expanded to include over 58 Institutional Members.

== Student organizations ==
=== Canadian Alliance of Student Associations (CASA) ===
Following a dispute with the Canadian Federation of Students over policy and organization, the Canadian Alliance of Student Associations was formed in 1995. Initially composed of student unions from 5 founding institutions, this has now grown to 23. The Alliance networks student governments and represents and defends students' interests at both the federal and inter-provincial levels.

=== Canadian Federation of Students (CFS) ===
The largest student organization in Canada, The Canadian Federation of Students first appeared in 1981 along with its services branch, the CFS-Services, with its mandate to work for high quality, accessible post-secondary education at the federal level and provincial levels. CFS provides students with an effective and united voice, provincially and nationally believing that for students to adequately represent their collective interests, they needed to unite under one organization.

=== Undergraduates of Canadian Research Intensive Universities (UCRU) ===
The Undergraduates of Canadian Research Intensive Universities, formed in 2015, represents undergraduate students at universities that are a part of the U15. Advocacy priorities for the organization include indigenous students, international students, the Canada Student Loan Program, and undergraduate research funding.

== Provincial organizations ==
=== Colleges Ontario ===
Colleges Ontario represents the 24 (as of February 2022) publicly funded colleges in Ontario.

== Former organizations ==
=== Canadian Council on Learning (CCL) ===
The Canadian Council on Learning was a channel for lifelong learning, encouraging and supporting data-based decisions about learning during all stages of life, from early childhood through to the senior years. The organization received about 85% of its funding from the Government of Canada, which announced in January 2010, that it was not renewing its funding.
