= Maple League =

Association of Canadian universities

Maple League of Universities
- Location: Eastern Canada
- Members: Acadia University; Bishop's University; Mount Allison University; St. Francis Xavier University
- Executive director: Jack Rice
- Staff: 3
- Website: mapleleague.ca
- Formerly called: U4

The Maple League of Universities, previously known as the U4, is an association of four universities in eastern Canada. The four member schools, Acadia University, Bishop's University, Mount Allison University, and St. Francis Xavier University, are all small, residential, primarily undergraduate liberal arts institutions.

== History ==
The Maple League was founded in May 2013 as the U4, and adopted its current name in November 2016. The name "Maple League" was inspired by the Ivy League in the United States.

== Members ==
Locations of Maple League member universities

The four member universities of the Maple League are all primarily undergraduate institutions and located in Eastern Canada: one in Quebec, one in New Brunswick, and two in Nova Scotia. All were established in the early-mid 1800s.

| University | Province | Location | Established |
|---|---|---|---|
| Acadia University | Nova Scotia | Wolfville | 1838 |
| Bishop's University | Quebec | Sherbrooke | 1843 |
| Mount Allison University | New Brunswick | Sackville | 1839 |
| St. Francis Xavier University | Nova Scotia | Antigonish | 1853 |

== See also ==
- Higher education in Canada
- List of universities in Canada
- List of higher education associations and alliances
- List of higher education associations and organizations in Canada
