= Bishop's University =

University in Sherbrooke, Quebec, Canada

- Université Bishop's (French)
- Former name: The University of Bishop's College
- Motto: Recti cultus pectora roborant (Latin)
- Motto in English: Righteous ways makes strong the heart
- Type: Liberal arts college
- Established: 1843; 183 years ago
- Academic affiliations: AUCC, IAU, QSSF, CBIE, CUP, Maple League of Universities
- Endowment: C$ 74.593 million (2023)
- Chancellor: Daniel Fournier
- Vice-Chancellor: Sébastien Lebel-Grenier
- Principal: Sébastien Lebel-Grenier
- Faculty: 115
- Students: 2,867
- Undergraduates: 2,340 full-time students 219 part-time students
- Location: Sherbrooke, Quebec, Canada; 45°22′0.16″N 71°50′43.67″W
- Campus: 550; Rural, 220 ha (550 acres)
- Colours: Purple and silver
- Nickname: Bishop's Gaiters
- Mascot: Alligator
- Website: ubishops.ca

Bishop's University (French: Université Bishop's) is a small English-language liberal arts university in Lennoxville, a borough of Sherbrooke, Quebec, Canada. The founder of the institution was the Anglican Bishop of Quebec, George Mountain, who also served as the first principal of McGill University. It is one of three universities in the province of Quebec that teach primarily in English, with the others being McGill University and Concordia University, both in Montreal. It began its foundation by absorbing the Lennoxville Classical School as Bishop's College School in the 1840s. The college was formally founded in 1843 and received a royal charter from Queen Victoria in 1853.

It remains one of Canada's few primarily undergraduate universities, functioning in the way of an American liberal arts college, and is linked with three others in the Maple League. Established in 1843 as Bishop's College, the school remained under the Anglican church's direction from its founding until 1947. Since that time, the university has been a non-denominational institution. Bishop's University has graduated fifteen Rhodes Scholars.

The university shares a campus with its neighbor, Champlain College Lennoxville, an English-language public college.

== History ==
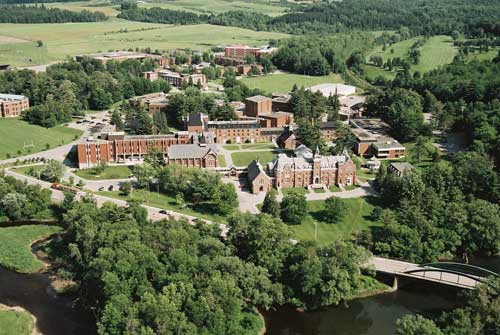
Bishop's University aerial view

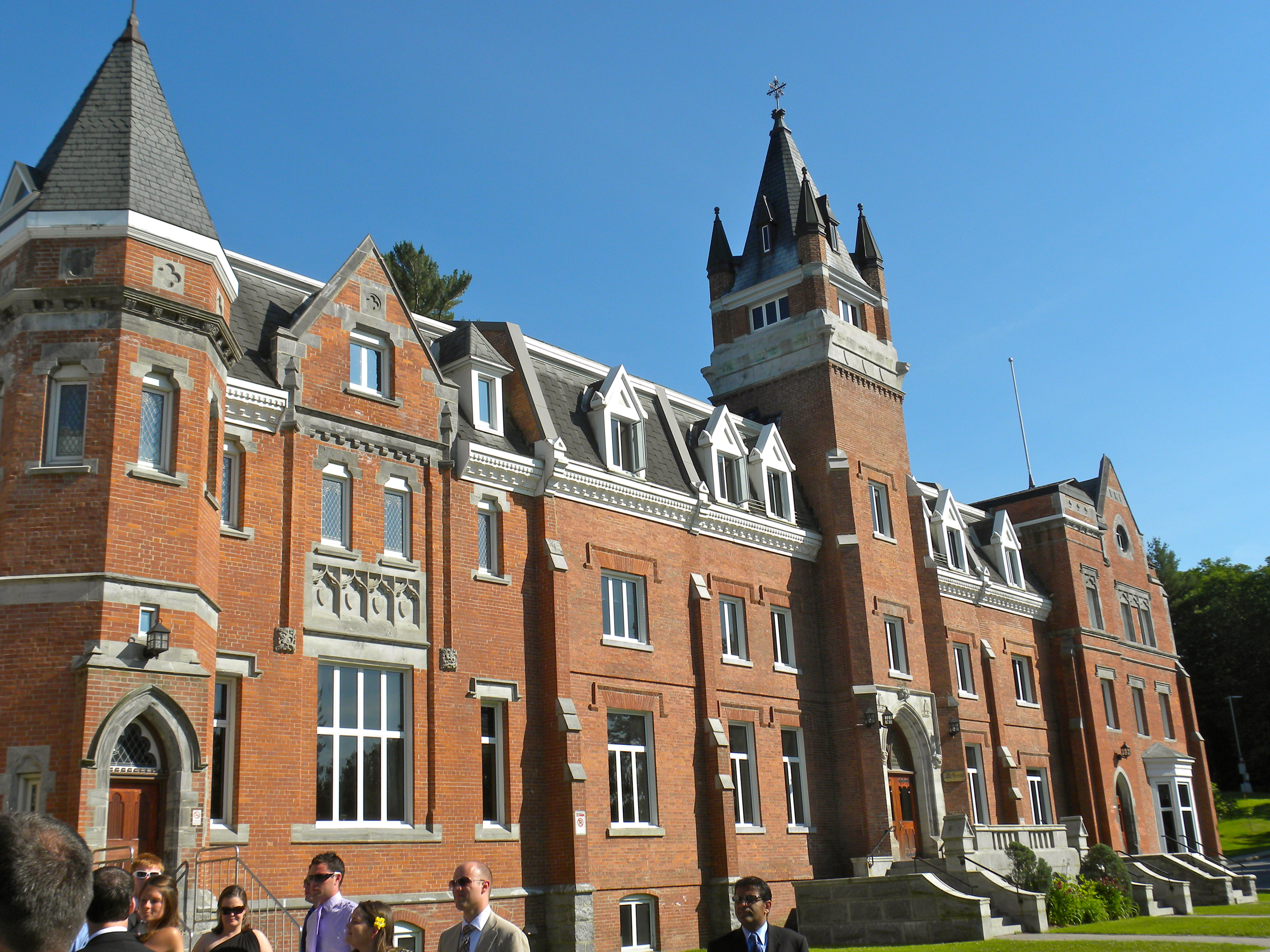
Bishop's University McGreer Hall

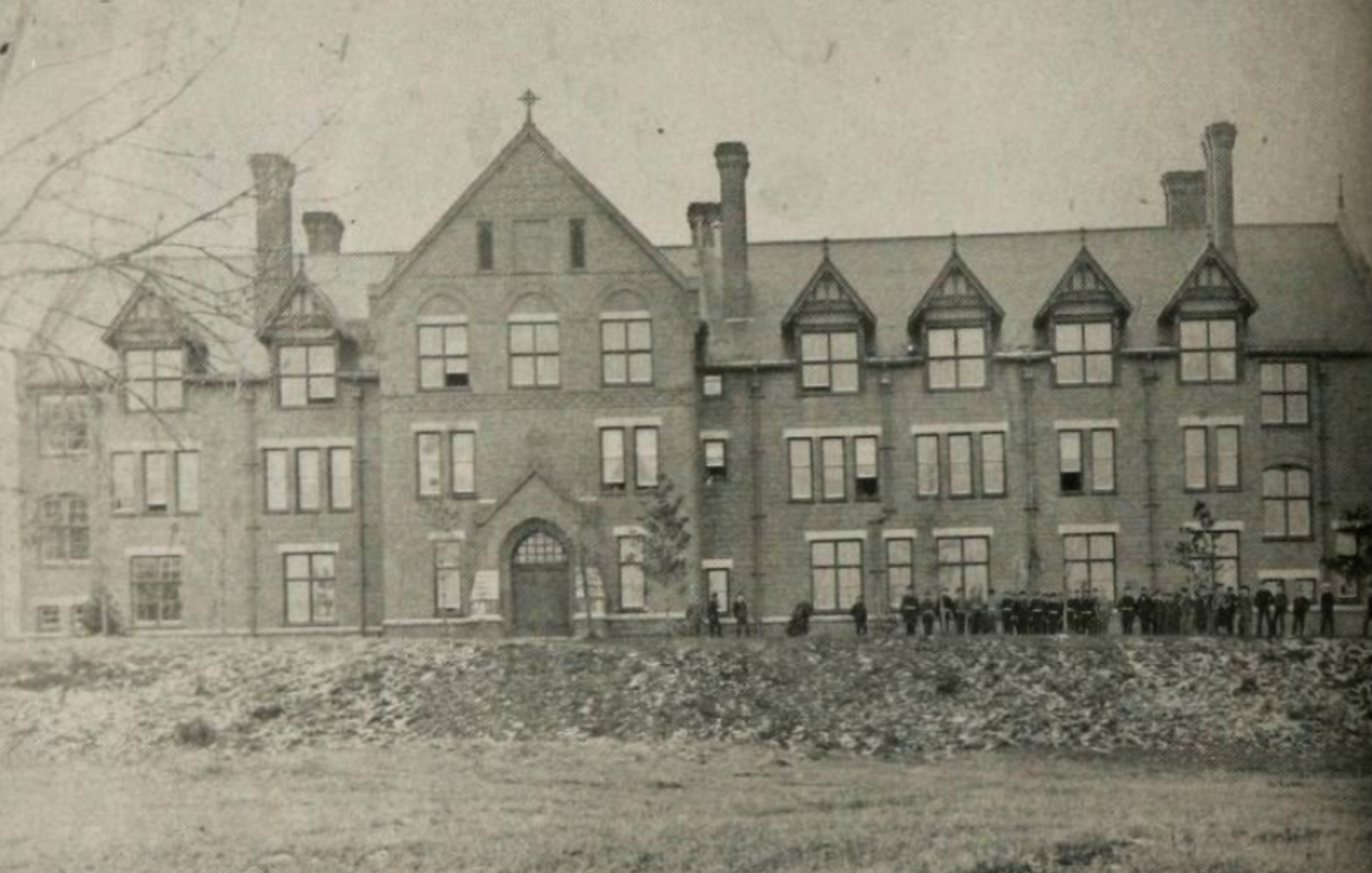
Bishop's College School as the Grammar School, 1885 in Bishop's University (New Arts Today)

Bishop's University can trace its roots back to 1836 when Bishop's College School, a "Grammar School in connection with the College," was founded as the Lennoxville Classical School, an independent institute by Rev. Lucius Doolittle and Edward Chapman. The university section, Bishop's College was based on the grammar school and established by the Lord Bishop of Québec The Rt. Rev. Dr. George Jehoshaphat Mountain (who also served as the first principal of McGill College) on December 9, 1843, in Lennoxville, Quebec, for the education of members of the Church of England and erected into a university in 1853. The school was founded by Bishop Mountain, the third Anglican bishop of Quebec, as a liberal arts college. In 1845, instruction began, and in 1854, the first degrees were granted.

In 1845, the Reverend Jasper Hume Nicolls, a Fellow of Queen's College, Oxford was appointed first principal of Bishop's College. In 1853, he and Bishop Mountain obtained the Royal Charter through which the college became a university. He led Bishop's for 32 years, through several financial crises.

A faculty of medicine, known as Bishop's Medical Faculty, Montreal, was established in Montreal in 1871, and closed in 1905 when it amalgamated with McGill University.

A short-lived Faculty of Law was established in Sherbrooke in 1880, to close in 1888. It granted only fifteen degrees.

In 1922, Bishop's College School moved to its new campus on Moulton Hill from the Little Forks at BU as a severe fire happened in 1891. Yet, many connections remained.

The Church of England controlled the university until 1947. Since 1947, a corporation and appointed trustees have been responsible for its business affairs, and a senate has dealt with academic matters. This bicameral model of governance was based on the 1906 provincial University of Toronto Act, which established a system dividing university government into a senate (faculty) to set academic policy, and a board of governors (citizens) to oversee financial policy and other matters.

The president, appointed by the board, was to perform institutional leadership and provide a link between the senate and the board of governors. In the early part of the twentieth century, professional education expanded beyond the traditional fields of theology, law, and medicine, while graduate training based on specialized course work and the completion of a research thesis was introduced. The policy of university education initiated in the 1960s responded to population pressure and the belief that higher education was a key to social justice and economic productivity for individuals and for society.

On December 9, 1993, a Sesquicentennial Convocation was held in Centennial Theatre. Governor General of Canada Ray Hnatyshyn presented the Coat of Arms and Flag and signed and presented the Letters Patent of Bishop's University.

In 2007, enrolment had shrunk by 14 per cent and was "falling like a stone," then-Principal Michael Goldbloom told The Montreal Gazette after he was hired in 2008. Furthermore, campus morale was low after a 41-day strike by staff and a lock-out of faculty. The university had a $1.4 million operating deficit and was relying on a $9 million line of credit to remain solvent, prompting rumours that the university would close. By 2010, however, Bishop's rebounded as enrolment shot up by 20 per cent after new leadership was hired and aggressive student recruitment efforts were instituted. The university's finances also improved significantly.

Language officials in Quebec announced in October 2023 that Canadian students from outside Quebec who come to study at a university in the province will pay twice as much in tuition beginning in the fall of 2024. The new policy would disproportionately affect the province's three English-language universities. Citing the potential loss of 30% of the student body, Sébastien Lebel-Grenier, Bishop's principal and vice-chancellor, told the Montreal Gazette, "That's more than significant — for Bishop's, it could mean an existential threat." The CAQ government announced shortly thereafter that it was looking at various scenarios to maintain the vitality of Bishop's as many in the business and political communities have called for an exemption for Bishop's. At a news conference on November 24, 2023, Quebec Premier Francois Legault announced that Bishop's University will be "exempted" from the proposed tuition hikes for out-of-province students at Quebec's universities.

== Academic programs ==
Primarily undergraduate, Bishop's University also offers graduate courses and M.A. and M.Ed. degrees in education and M.Sc. in computer science and physics. Bishop's offers several programs from five academic divisions:

- Williams School of Business
- Division of Humanities
- Division of Natural Sciences and Mathematics
- Division of Social Sciences
- School of Education

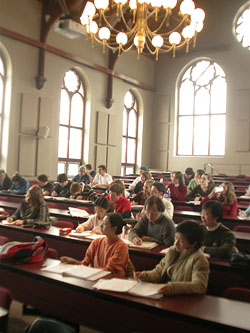
Bishop Williams Hall

Each division seeks to provide a well-rounded education for all its students. The average class size as of fall 2017 was 34.7 in first- and second-year courses and 18.9 in upper-year courses. Administratively, the Divisions of Humanities, Natural Sciences and Mathematics, and Social Sciences are part of the Faculty of Arts and Science.

In 2004, Bishop's joined the Université de Sherbrooke in creating SIXtron, a joint spin-off of technology based in Montreal which is focused on developing highly scalable and cost-effective, amorphous silicon carbide (SiC)-based thin film coatings for the solar industry.

In 2009, the Psychological Health and Well-Being Laboratory was founded as an initiative to produce and share knowledge regarding how to enhance the psychological health and well-being of individuals and the communities that they live in. The research cluster is headed by Dr. Heather Lawford. It is one of four research clusters, the others examining Social and Cultural Identities; climate change; and astrophysics.

As of 2018, Bishop's had a total of 2,867 students. The student body represents every Canadian province and territory along with 18 U.S. states and more than 50 countries.

=== Williams School of Business ===
The Williams School of Business is the business school at Bishop's University. It is accredited under the Network of International Business Schools (NIBS) and claims multiple first place victories in international business case competitions. It offers courses through a bachelor of business administration (BBA) or Bachelor of Arts (BA) major in business. A cooperative education program is also offered. Approximately 22% of Bishop's University students are enrolled in the Williams School of Business.

The Williams School of Business offers the following concentrations under the BBA:

- Accounting
- Entrepreneurship
- Finance
- Human Resources
- International Business
- Marketing
- General Business Management

== Campus ==
The Bishop's campus is located on 220 hectares (550 acres) of land at the junction of the Saint Francis and Massawippi rivers in the Eastern Townships region of Quebec and features 25 buildings. The site of Bishop's College, a grassy knoll at the confluence of two rivers, provided a natural setting where architecture would be viewed as an integral but subsidiary part of the scenic vista. Known as 'Oxford on the Massawippi' for its architectural style, the campus is significantly influenced by the Gothic Revival period and is home to some of Quebec's most historic buildings, including St. Mark's chapel. Construction on campus began with "Old Arts" in 1846 and continues today with the university's most recent building, the Library Learning Commons, in 2017. The campus also provided the setting for the films Lost and Delirious (2001) and The Covenant (2006).

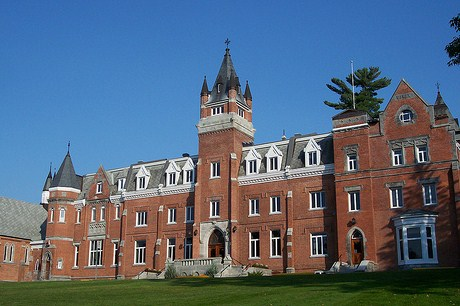
McGreer Hall

=== McGreer Hall ===
McGreer Hall is named in honour of Arthur Huffman McGreer (1883–1947), Principal from 1922 to 1947. The original hall was constructed in 1846; the Lodge was added in 1847 as a residence for the Principal. In 1876 the central block was gutted by fire. It was rebuilt, and enlarged in 1898 with the extension of the third floor and the addition of the central tower. In 1909 the Library wing was added.

=== Bishop Williams Hall ===
Bishop Williams Hall is a lecture and presentation hall originally built in 1891. Funds for its construction were raised by Bishop's College School (BCS) old boys, who wanted to mark the 25th anniversary of the consecration of Bishop James William Williams, a former headmaster of the college and 4th Anglican bishop of Québec. The hall was destroyed by fire later the same, and rebuilt in 1892.

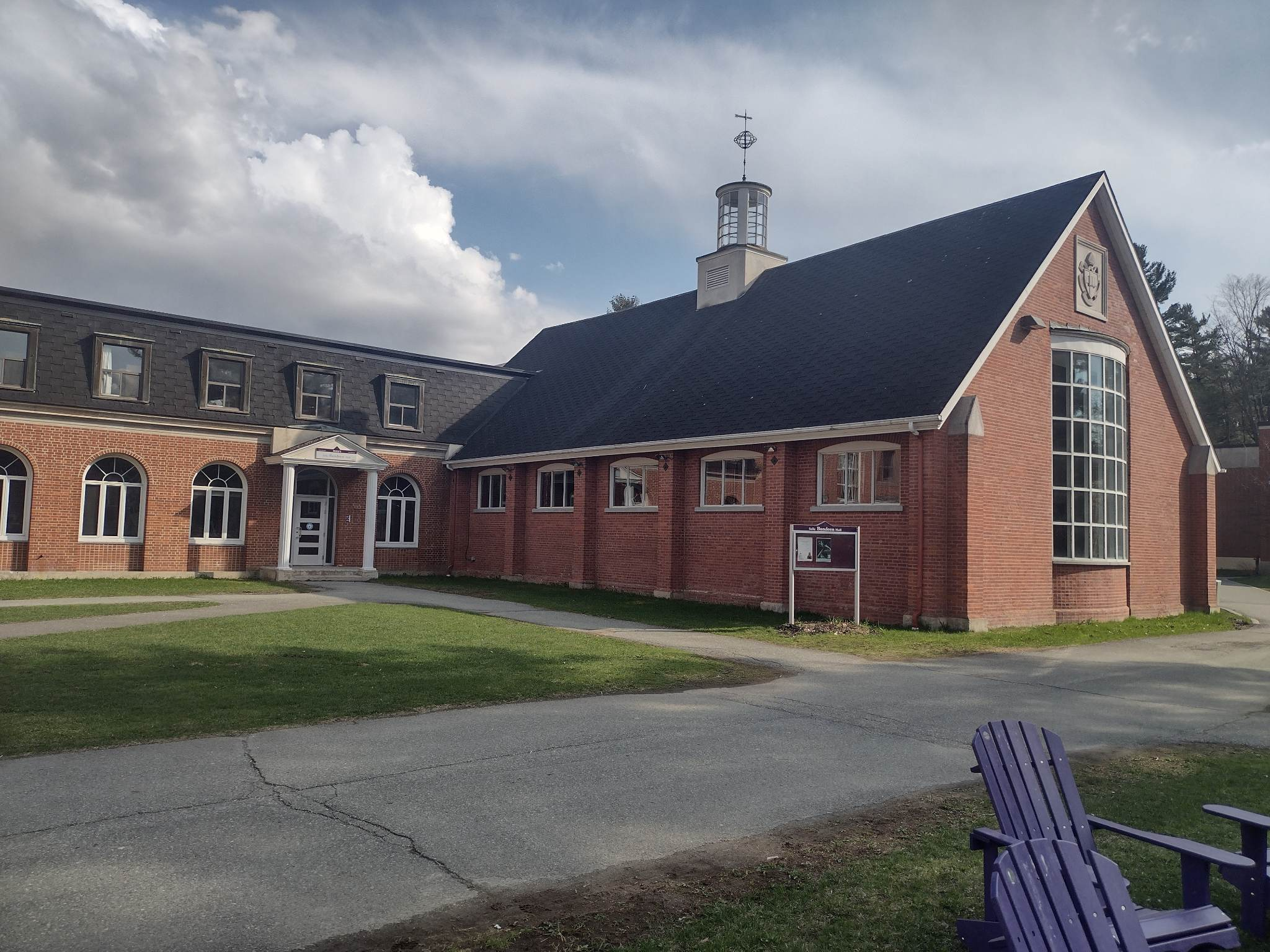
Bandeen Hall

=== Bandeen Hall ===
Bandeen Hall was originally used as a gymnasium for undergraduates and for the boys of Bishop's College School. In 1950 the room was converted into a dining-hall for the Norton-Pollack residence complex. After 1971 the room served as the undergraduate Pub, and for a time housed temporary studios for the Fine Arts departments of Champlain College and the university.

In 1990, funds raised by the Learning for Life campaign were used to convert the area into a concert hall; it was named for the late Robert A. Bandeen, a former Chancellor of the university, and his wife, Mona Blair Bandeen.

=== Centennial Theatre ===
Centennial Theatre opened as a performing arts centre in 1967 as a Centennial project celebrating Canada's 100th birthday, with a mandate to provide a theatrical and cultural platform for English-speaking residents in the Eastern Townships. The theatre combines the wide auditorium style of a Greek amphitheatre with an Italian stage house, with proscenium and flies. It has seating for 549.

=== Old Library and Archives ===
This building was added to McGreer Hall in 1909, and served as the University Library. In the 1970s it was divided into two floors, the wooden ceiling covered by tiles, and became office space. The library wing was restored to its original design in time for the Sesquicentennial celebrations in 1993–1994.

The Old Library houses the collections of the University Archives and the Eastern Townships Research Centre, including books, genealogical information, documents, photographs, postcards, maps, plans, and audio-visual material. The room also hosts lectures, receptions, special events, and quiet study.

=== Library Learning Commons ===
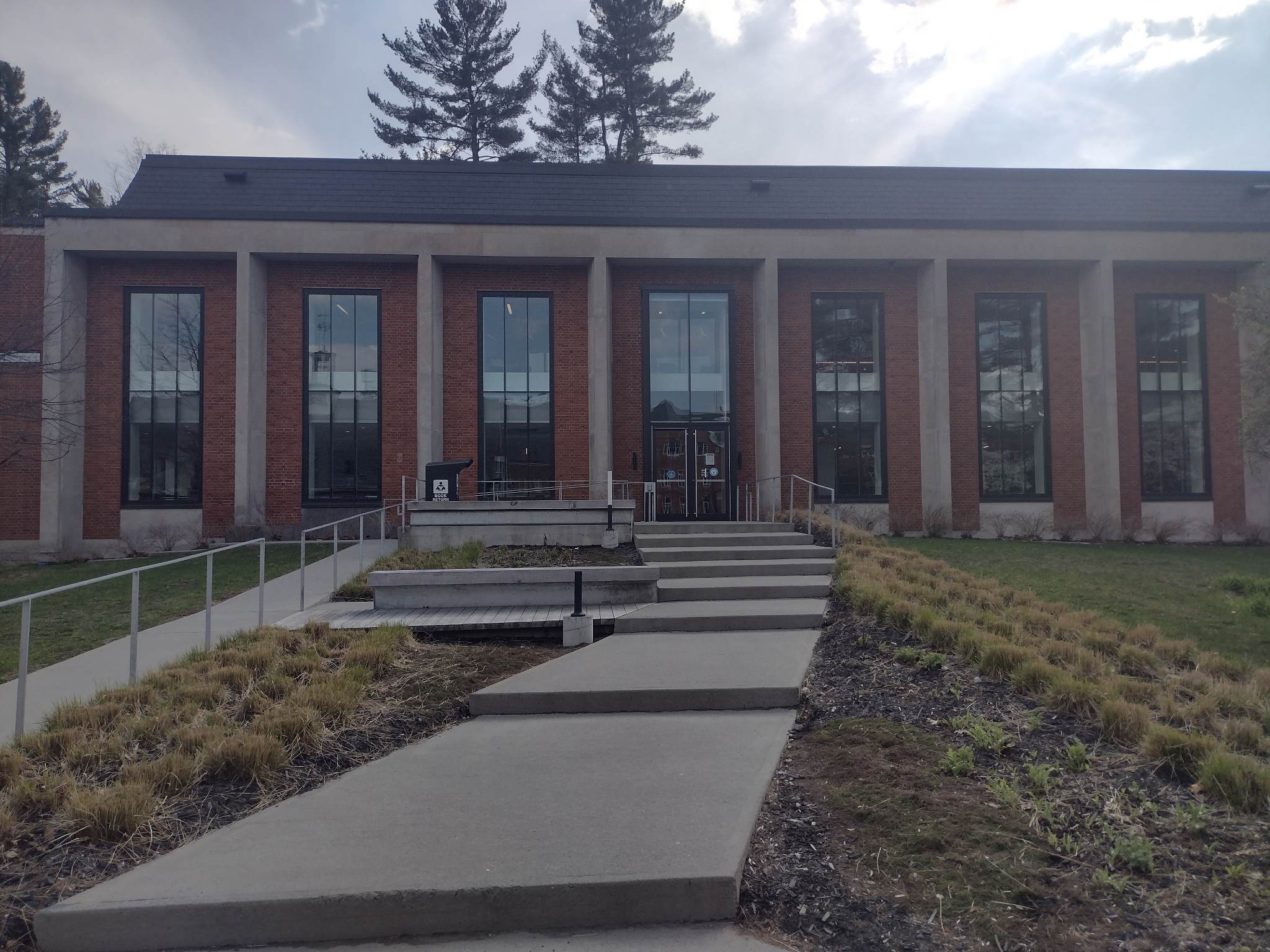
Renovated John Bassett Memorial Library

The Library Learning Commons—formerly known as the John Bassett Memorial Library prior to extensive renovations completed in 2018—provides study and research support for the students and faculty of both Bishop's University and Champlain College, Lennoxville Campus. The present building was built in 1959, and expanded in 1970, 1990, and 2017. The Library's holdings are over 598,000 items, including books, microforms, and audio-visual materials, as well as those of the approximately 19,550 periodical titles including online periodicals. Research and study are further supported by collections of Canadian Government documents, and Maps. In-house resources are augmented by an Inter-Library Loan network.

=== Art Gallery ===
Bishop's University houses the Foreman Art Gallery, which exhibits contemporary and historical painting, sculpture, mixed media, installation, video and films by students, faculty, Canadian and international artists. Hung throughout the buildings on campus, the collection consists of 150 works, many by 19th- and 20th-century Canadian artists.

=== Nicolls Building ===
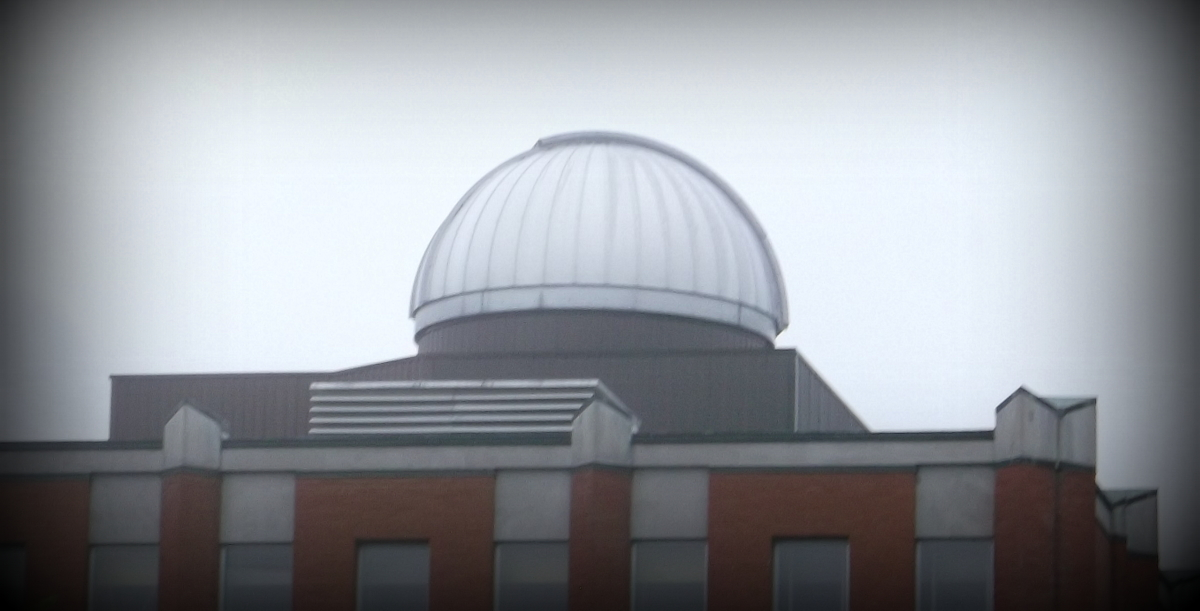
Observatory of the university

The Nicolls Building is named in honour of the Reverend Jasper Hume Nicolls. An observatory is located on the roof of the Nicolls building. The observatory houses a Schmidt-Cassegrain telescope and is also open to the public.

=== Old Lennox Golf & Ski ===
The Bishop's campus uniquely features a golf course and cross-country ski club: The Old Lennox Golf & Ski. The club was founded by the university and was chartered by the Royal Canadian Golf Association in 1897. The course remains one of the oldest in Canada. The club features over 7 km of cross-country ski trails, including about 5 km which are certified by the International Ski and Snowboard Federation (FIS)

=== St. Mark's Chapel ===
St. Mark's Chapel was built in the Perpendicular Gothic style, and was consecrated in 1857 by George Jehoshaphat Mountain. It was almost completely destroyed by fire in 1891, and rebuilt on the same site, and fitted with ash furniture, panelling and wood sculptures by the Sherbrooke cabinet-making firm of George Long and his assistant, Georges Bélanger. St. Mark's Chapel was declared Cultural Property by the Quebec Ministere des Affaires culturelles in 1989.

=== Student societies ===
Bishop's University has several fraternities and sororities.

== Athletics ==
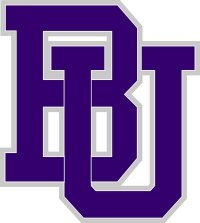
Bishop's athletics logo

The Bishop's University teams are known as the "Gaiters" and compete in the U Sports, RSEQ, AUS, and CUFLA. Although their logo and mascot suggest the term stems from the word alligator, "Gaiter" actually refers to a leg covering worn by Anglican bishops up until the middle of the 20th century. The Gaiters are represented by eight varsity teams (Football, Men's & Women's Basketball, Men's & Women's Rugby, Women's Soccer, Men's & Women's Golf and Women's Hockey) and three club teams (Men's Lacrosse, Men's Hockey, Men's Soccer). The Bishop's Gaiters have a long history with the university. The early days were marked by massive participation in team sports such as cricket and football. Rugby football began in 1888 and Canadian football was a budding varsity sport by the 1930s. The Gaiters football team's home stadium is Coulter Field.

As of March 2019, there are three former Bishop's football players in the CFL: Adrian Clarke, Stephen Adekolu, and Junior Turner.

== Traditions ==
=== School song ===
Bishop's official school song, "Alma Mater," was written in 1937. In 1964, however, the lyrics "Raise a toast to Bishop's University" were written by John Piper, Douglas Tees, Ace Henderson and John Martland as part of the musical comedy, "The Grate Escape," performed by the Bishop's choir. The tune stuck and has become the unofficial song of the university. In practice however, the second line of the second verse is changed to a more vulgar and humorous version.

== Charities ==
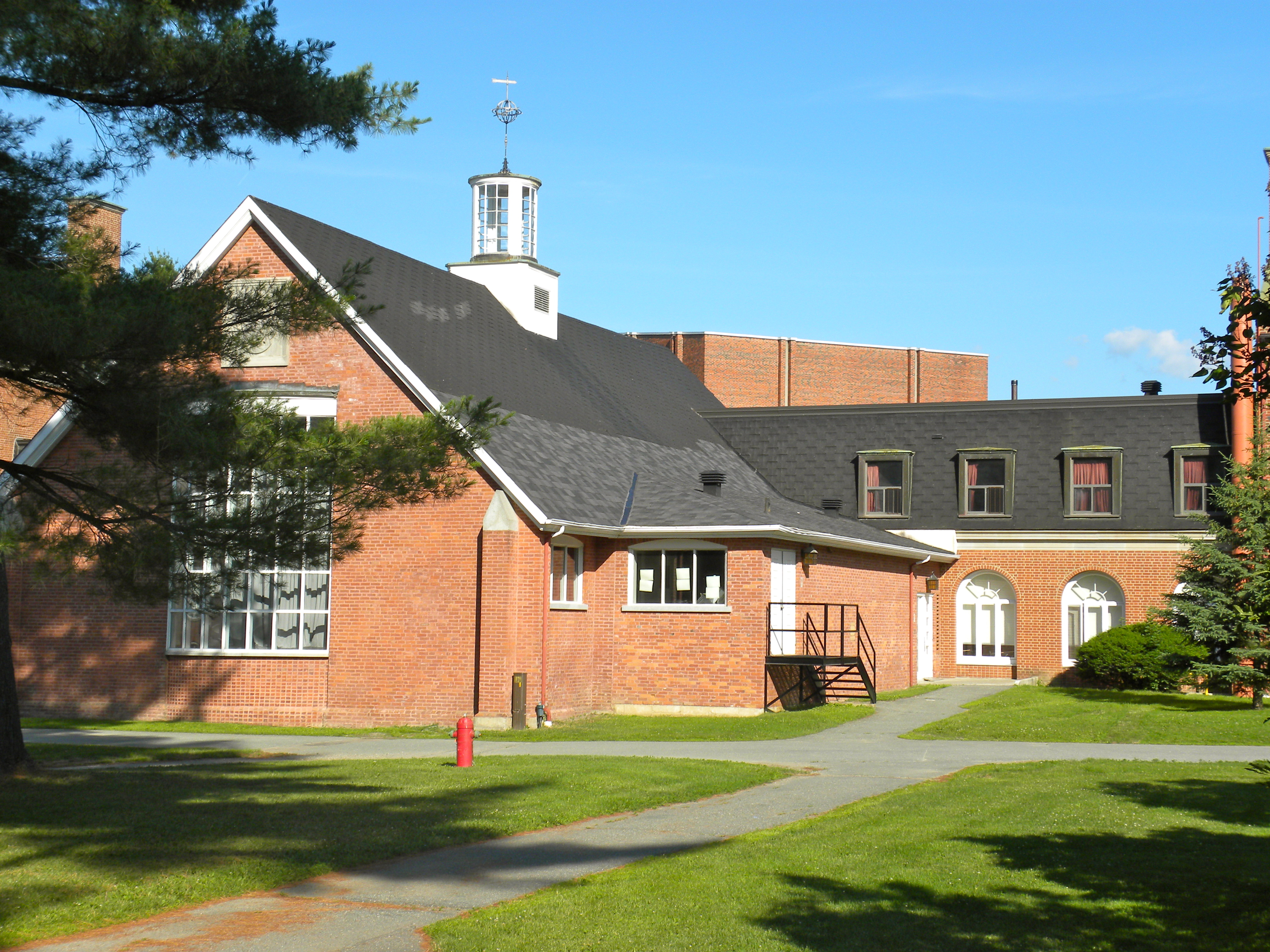
Bishop's University campus 2011 03

Bishop's University was registered as a charitable organization in Canada on January 1, 1967. The primary areas in which the charity is now carrying on programs to achieve its charitable purposes, ranked according to the percentage of time and resources devoted to each program area follow:

- Universities and colleges 95%
- Research (scientific, medical, environmental, etc.) 3%
- Cultural programs, including heritage languages 1%

The charity carried on charitable programs to further its charitable purpose(s) (as defined in its governing documents) this fiscal period:

- University education & research.
- financial aid (scholarships & bursaries) to Bishop's University students
- cultural programs and community outreach.

== Legacy ==
On 28 January 2003, Canada Post issued the Bishop's University, 1853-2003 stamp as part of its Canadian Universities series. Based on a photograph by Guy Lavigueur and designed by Denis L'Allier, the 48¢ stamps are perforated 13.5 and printed by the Canadian Bank Note Company.

== Chancellors ==
- 1853–1856 The Hon. William Walker
- 1856–1858 The Hon. Edward Bowen
- 1858–1865 The Hon. John Samuel McCord
- 1865–1875 The Hon. Edward Hale
- 1875–1878 The Hon. George Irvine
- 1878–1900 Richard William Heneker
- 1900–1926 John Hamilton
- 1926–1932 Frederick Edmund Meredith
- 1932–1942 Chief Justice The Hon. R.A.E. Greenshields
- 1942–1950 G.H. Montgomery
- 1950–1958 John W. H. Bassett
- 1958–1968 The Hon. Mr. Justice D.C. Abbott
- 1968–1974 Brigadier John H. Price
- 1974–1981 The Hon. Mr. Justice W. Mitchell
- 1981–1987 Robert A. Bandeen
- 1987–1995 William I.M. Turner Jr.
- 1995–2005 Alexander Kennedy Paterson
- 2005–2013 Scott Griffin
- 2013–2020 Brian M. Levitt
- 2020–present Daniel Fournier

== Principals ==
- The Rev. Jasper H. Nicolls, 1845
- The Rev. J.A. Lobley, 1878
- The Rev. Thomas Adams, 1885
- The Rev. J.P. Whitney, 1900
- The Rev. T.B. Waitt, 1905
- The Rev. H. de B. Gibbins, 1906
- The Rev. R.A. Parrock, 1907
- The Rev. Canon H.H. Bedford-Jones, 1920
- The Rev. Arthur Huffman McGreer, 1922
- A.R. Jewitt, 1948
- C.L.O. Glass, 1959
- A.W. Preston, 1969
- D.M. Healy, 1970
- C.I.H. Nicholl, 1976
- H.M. Scott, 1986
- Janyne M. Hodder, 1995
- Robert Poupart, 2004
- Jonathan Rittenhouse (Interim), 2007
- Michael Goldbloom CM 2008

== Notable alumni ==
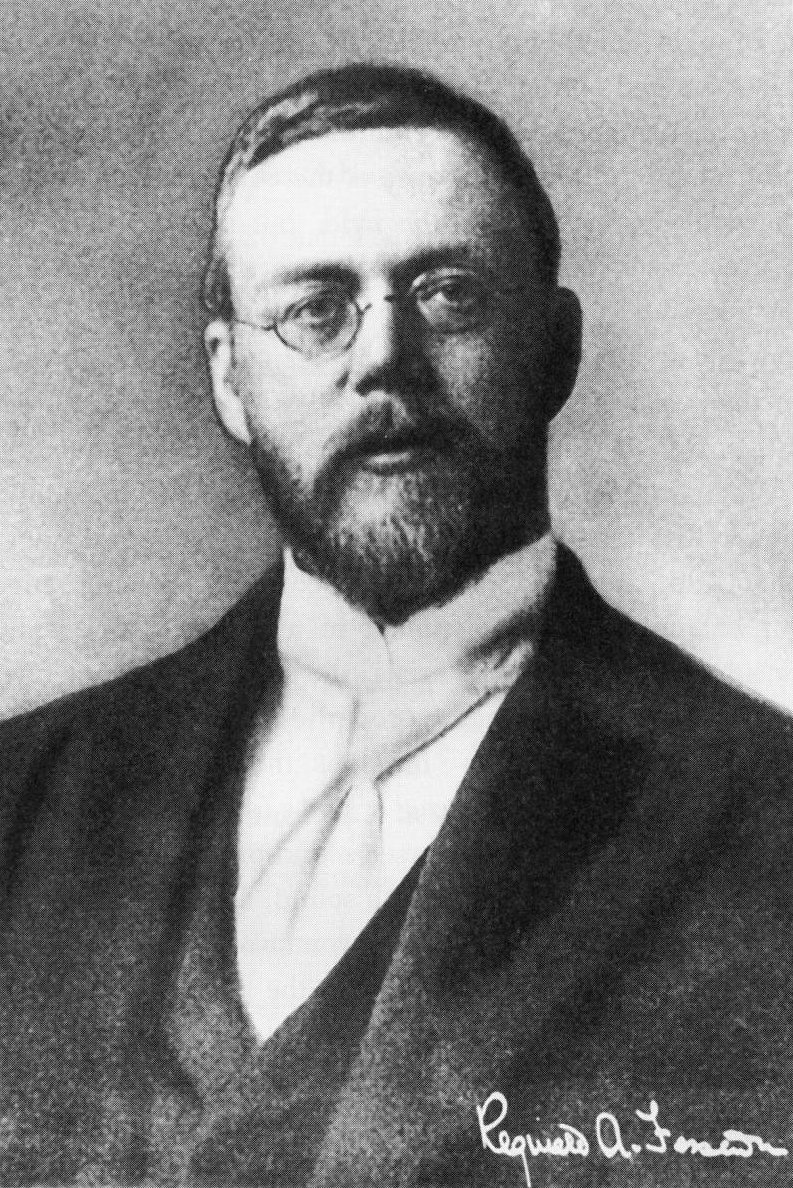
In 1906, Reginald Fessenden transmitted the first radio audio broadcast from Brant Rock, Massachusetts.

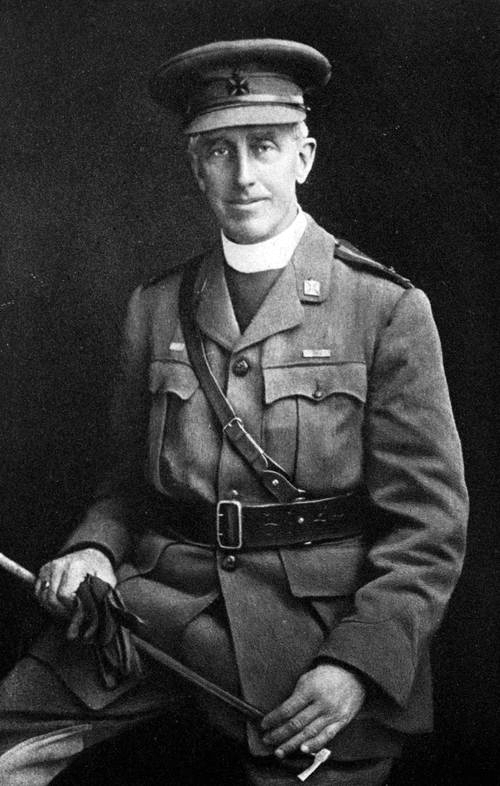
The Rev. Canon Frederick Scott, Senior Chaplain, First Canadian Division, Canadian Expeditionary Force.

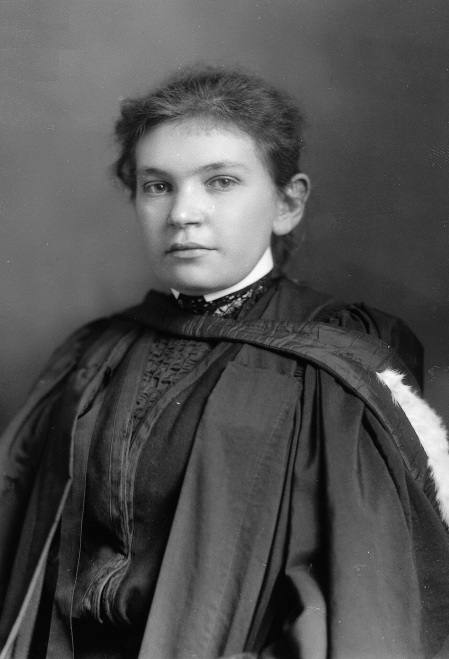
Dr. Maude Abbott, one of Canada's earliest female medical graduates.

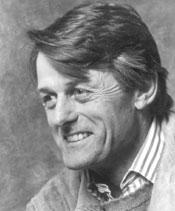
Scott Griffin, founder of the Griffin Poetry Prize, one of the world's most generous poetry awards.

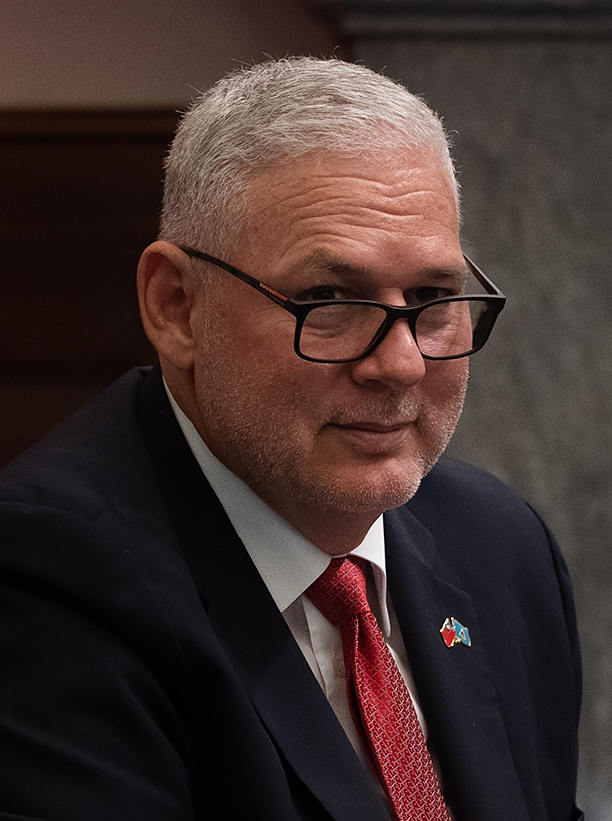
Allen Chastenet, seventh Prime Minister of St. Lucia.
