= Robert Asselin =

Canadian writer

Robert Asselin (born 1974) is an author, a public policy expert and a former advisor to Canadian prime ministers and ministers under various Liberal governments. In July 2020, he was appointed senior vice-president, policy at the Business Council of Canada. Asselin is a senior fellow at the Munk School of Global Affairs and Public Policy at the University of Toronto.

== Career ==
Asselin was the associate director of the Graduate School of Public and International Affairs at the University of Ottawa from 2007 to 2015.

He served as a senior advisor to Prime Minister Justin Trudeau during his leadership campaign and in the 2015 federal election.

In 2014, he was appointed visiting public policy scholar at the Woodrow Wilson International Center for Scholars in Washington, D.C.

From November 2015 to November 2017, he served as Budget and Policy Director to Canada's Finance Minister Bill Morneau.
