= Universities Canada =

Organization of universities

- Universités Canada (French)

- Arms of Universities Canada
- Formation: June 6, 1911 (first meeting)
- Type: Non-profit educational organization
- Purpose: Advocate and public voice, educator and network
- Headquarters: Ottawa, Ontario, Canada
- Region served: Canada
- Official language: English; French
- Website: univcan.ca

Universities Canada (French: Universités Canada) is an organization that represents Canada's universities. It is a non-profit national organization that coordinates university policies, guidance and direction.

Formed in 1911 as the Association of Universities and Colleges of Canada (AUCC), it represents 97 public and private not-for-profit Canadian universities and university colleges in Canada. It provides member services in public policy and advocacy, communications, research and information-sharing, and scholarships and international programs. In April 2015, the organization renamed itself "Universities Canada."

Universities Canada is not a higher education accreditation body. Membership in the association requires universities to meet strict criteria and adhere to set principles of institutional quality assurance that must be reaffirmed every five years. This reinforces the recognition of a Canadian university degree around the world as a high-quality academic achievement.

The association produces a number of publications, such as University Affairs magazine and the Directory of Canadian Universities.

Universities Canada's arms, supporters, and badge were registered with the Canadian Heraldic Authority on May 10, 2004.

It adopted its current name in 2015.

== Beliefs ==
=== Academic freedom ===
On 25 October 2011, Universities Canada, known then by its former name, announced a new "Statement on Academic Freedom" which was adopted unanimously by the membership at its centennial meeting. However, some have noted that the statement, drafted by academic administrators, essentially gives academic administrators the right to determine the limits of such freedom. It also does encourage the right of professors to speak out on subjects outside their area of expertise.

=== Advocacy ===
Universities Canada works in an advocacy role with governments to promote higher education and awareness of the contributions Canada's universities make to the country. Its priorities are increasing funding for universities' operating and capital costs, research, and international programs, along with improved student assistance.

It is also involved in the government's copyright reform process.

=== Equity, diversity, and inclusion ===
Universities Canada follows the Canadian government's Federal Employment Equity Act in developing their equity, diversity, and inclusion (EDI) policies for the four pillars of marginalized students, professors, and other university members. "Under-represented groups include those identified in the federal Employment Equity Act – women, visible minorities, Aboriginal peoples, and persons with disabilities – as well as, but not limited to, LGBTQ2+ people and men in female-dominated disciplines."

Universities Canada (and similarly the Canadian government) exclude social class from their EDI statement and initiatives. That is, the invisible minority who come from and/or live in poverty, those from working-class backgrounds, and those who are generally known as first-generation and/or low socioeconomic status. In Canada, poverty is termed as "social condition" and is not grounds for discrimination.

== Scholarship programs ==
The association is also active in managing government-funded international partnership programs and more than 130 scholarship programs on behalf of private sector companies.

In partnership with Community Foundations of Canada and Rideau Hall Foundation, the association manages the Canadian Queen Elizabeth II Diamond Jubilee Scholarships Program.

== Arms ==
Coat of arms of Universities Canada
Notes The arms of the Association of Universities and Colleges of Canada consist of: Crest On two closed books Vert, an open book proper bound and charged on the dexter page with a maple leaf Vert. Escutcheon Argent four pairs of maple seeds in saltire Vert. Supporters Two polar bears each holding a feather Argent penned Vert and resting a hind paw on an Ionic capital Argent, all set on a quadrangle Vert. Motto VOX ERUDITIONIS (Latin for 'A voice for higher learning') Badge Four pairs of maple seeds in saltire Vert

== See also ==
Higher education in Canada by province or territory
- Association of Commonwealth Universities
- U15 Group of Canadian Research Universities
