= List of Bishop's College School alumni =

Bishop's College School, a private secondary school founded in 1836 in the Borough of Lennoxville, Sherbrooke, Québec, Canada owns an Old boy network. Former male students are referred to as BCS Old Boys and former King's Hall, Compton & BCS female students are referred to as Old Girls. BCS's sister school, King's Hall, Compton, was founded in 1872 in Compton, Québec and merged with BCS in 1972.

The official charter of the Bishop's College School BCS Alumni Association was granted in 1901. The Heneker-Williams Society was created by the board of directors of the BCS Association to honour individuals who by leadership and example, have set the standard for volunteer support of Bishop's College School and King's Hall, Compton.

This list is a collection of notable BCS/KHC Alumni. For a list of BCS/KHC faculty see List of Bishop's College School Faculty.

Bishop's College School and Bishop's University have been two separate independent institutions since 1922, after sharing space on Bishop's University campus for nearly 80 years. Please do not include BU alumni on this page.

== Educators and thinkers ==
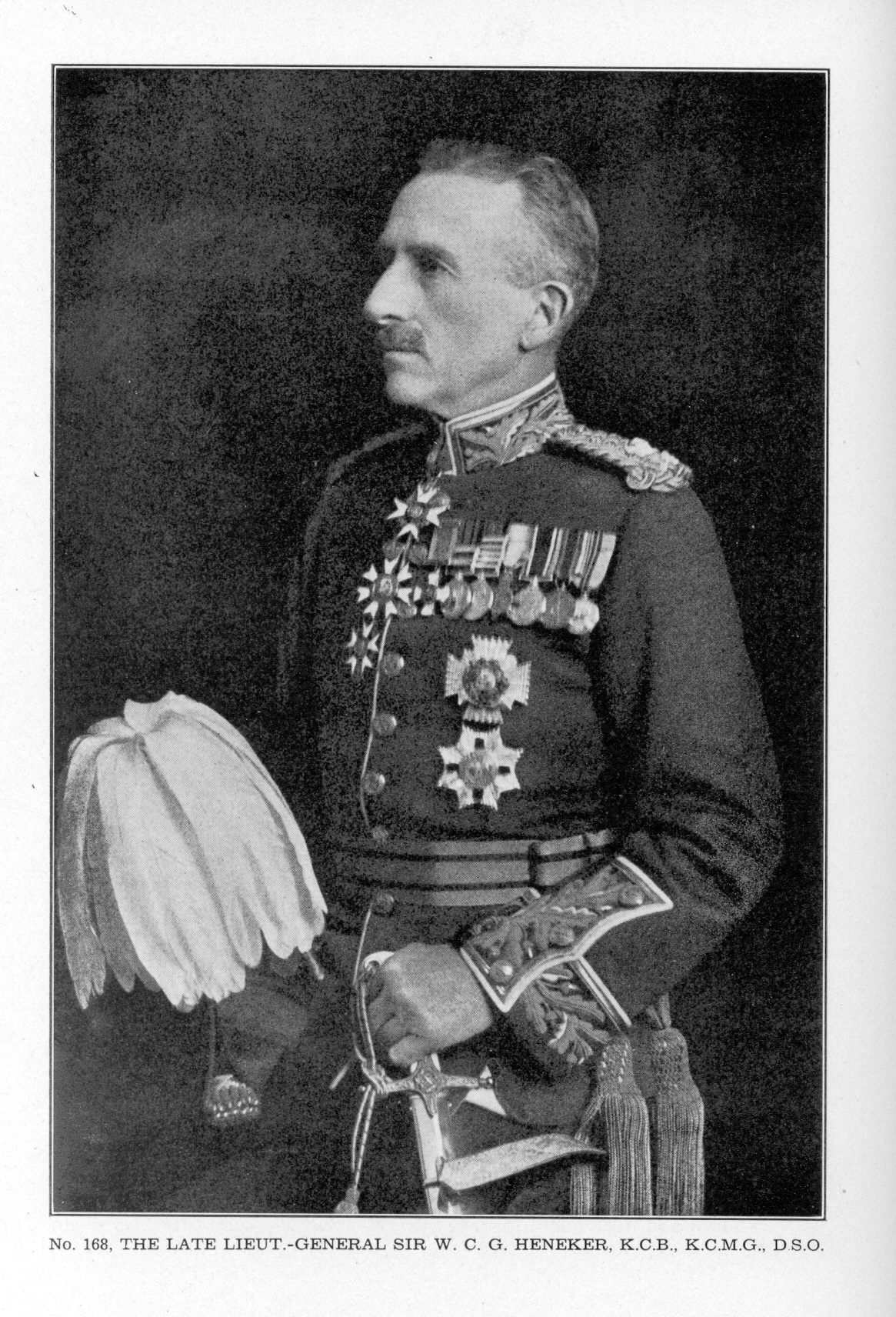
General Sir William Heneker

- Frederick Edmund Meredith KC (1862–1941), lawyer, Chancellor of Bishop's University and President of the Montreal Victorias, Bâtonnier of the Bar of Montreal.
- General Andrew McNaughton CH CB CMG DSO CD PC (1887–1966), as the electrical engineer who designed the Cathode Ray Direction Finder and the president of the National Research Board.
- Charles Sandwith Campbell KC (1858–1923) A benefactor who gave the City of Montreal the Campbell Concerts and Campbell Parks. He was a governor of McGill University.
- George Hurst (1926–2012), chief conductor of the BBC Philharmonic, visiting professor at the Royal Academy of Music in London.
- Eric Herbert Molson OC (born 1937) C.M., former chairman of Molson Coors and former Chancellor of Concordia University.
- William Heneker KCB, KCMG, DSO (1867–1939), one of only a handful of Canadians to reach the full rank of general in the British Army, BCS alumnus and former teacher.
- William Watson Ogilvie – was the president of the Montreal Board of Trade in 1893 and 1894, and a member of its council for six years. He was also a director of the Bank of Montreal, the Montreal Transportation Company, the North British and Mercantile Insurance Company, and a founding director of the Royal Trust Company.
- Reginald Aubrey Fessenden (1866–1932) professor at Purdue University and the founder and chair of the Electrical Engineering Department at the University of Pittsburgh.

== Sciences and engineering ==
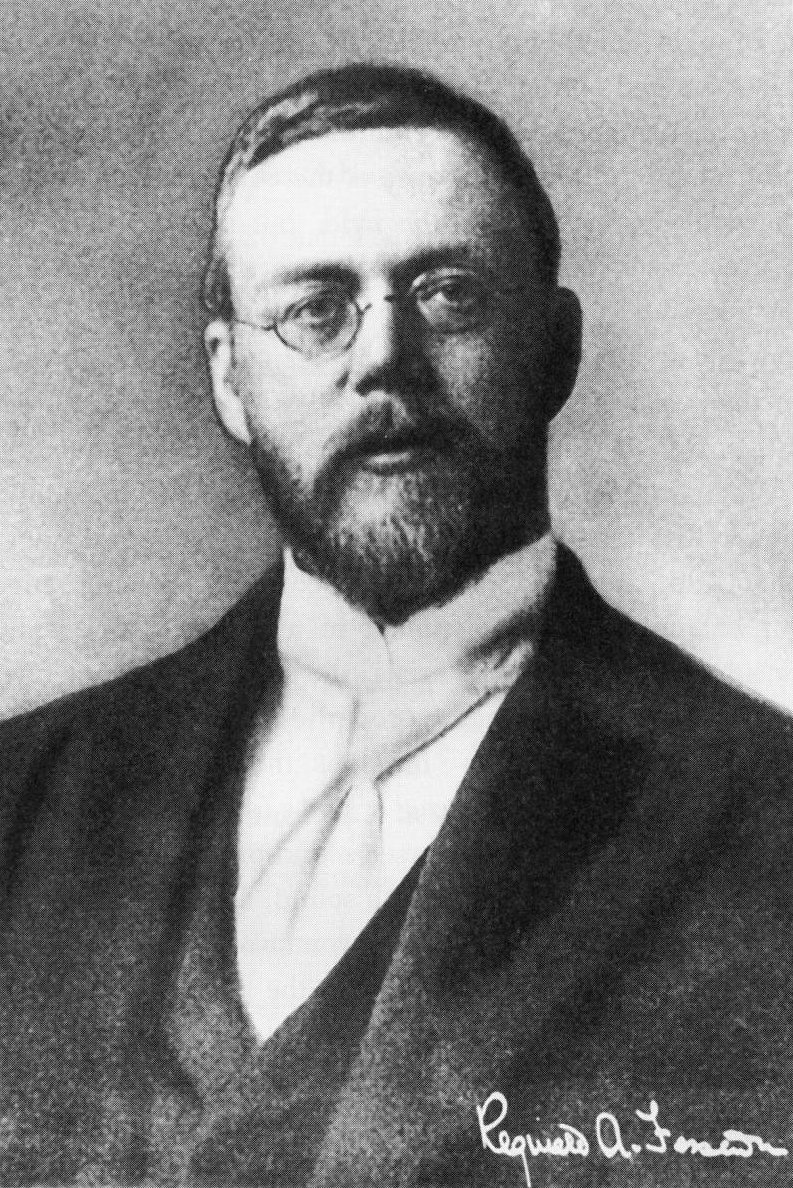
Reginald Fessenden, Inventor of Radio

- Reginald Aubrey Fessenden (1866–1932) Inventor of radio (AM broadcasting) and sonar "Fessenden oscillator", professor at the Purdue University and the founder/chair of the Electrical Engineering department at the University of Pittsburgh.
- General Andrew McNaughton CH CB CMG DSO CD PC (1887–1966), the electrical engineer who designed the Cathode Ray Direction Finder and the president of the National Research Board.
- Frederick Edmund Meredith KC (1862–1941), lawyer, Chancellor of Bishop's University and President of the Montreal Victorias, Bâtonnier of the Bar of Montreal
- Selwyn G. Blaylock (1879–1945), President of the Canadian Institute of Mining, established the Selwyn G. Blaylock Medal.
- James Ross (1848–1913) of Montreal, a Scottish-born Canadian civil engineer, businessman and philanthropist. He established his fortune predominantly through railway construction, notably for the Canadian Pacific Railway, of which he was the major shareholder, and also served as a governor of McGill University.
- Richard H. Tomlinson OC, (c. 1924 – 2018) was a Canadian chemist and philanthropist who graduated from Cambridge University. He is best known as a founding director of Gennum Corp., a Canadian manufacturer of semiconductors and semiconductor-based products, and for making one of the largest single donations to a Canadian university. He was also a professor emeritus of chemistry, McMaster University.

== Medicine and humanitarians ==
- Harry Woodburn Blaylock CBE (1978–1928) was Chief commissioner of the Canadian Red Cross Society.
- Hazen Sise (1906–1974) was a Canadian architect, educator, and humanitarian who worked alongside Norman Bethune as the chief fundraiser for the Committee to Aid Spanish Democracy in Madrid, Spain. He is responsible for introducing Bethune's achievements in China to the western world for the first time, and nominated Bethune's House as a National Historic Site of Canada.
- Sir James Lauder Brunton 4th Bt., of Stratford Place (1947-) was born in Montreal and educated at Bishop's College School, Lennoxville, Quebec, and McGill University, Montreal. He is a Professor of Medicine at the University of Toronto. His father and grandfather were also both educated at McGill. His grandfather (the 2nd Baronet) settled the family in Canada in 1912.

== Arts and media ==
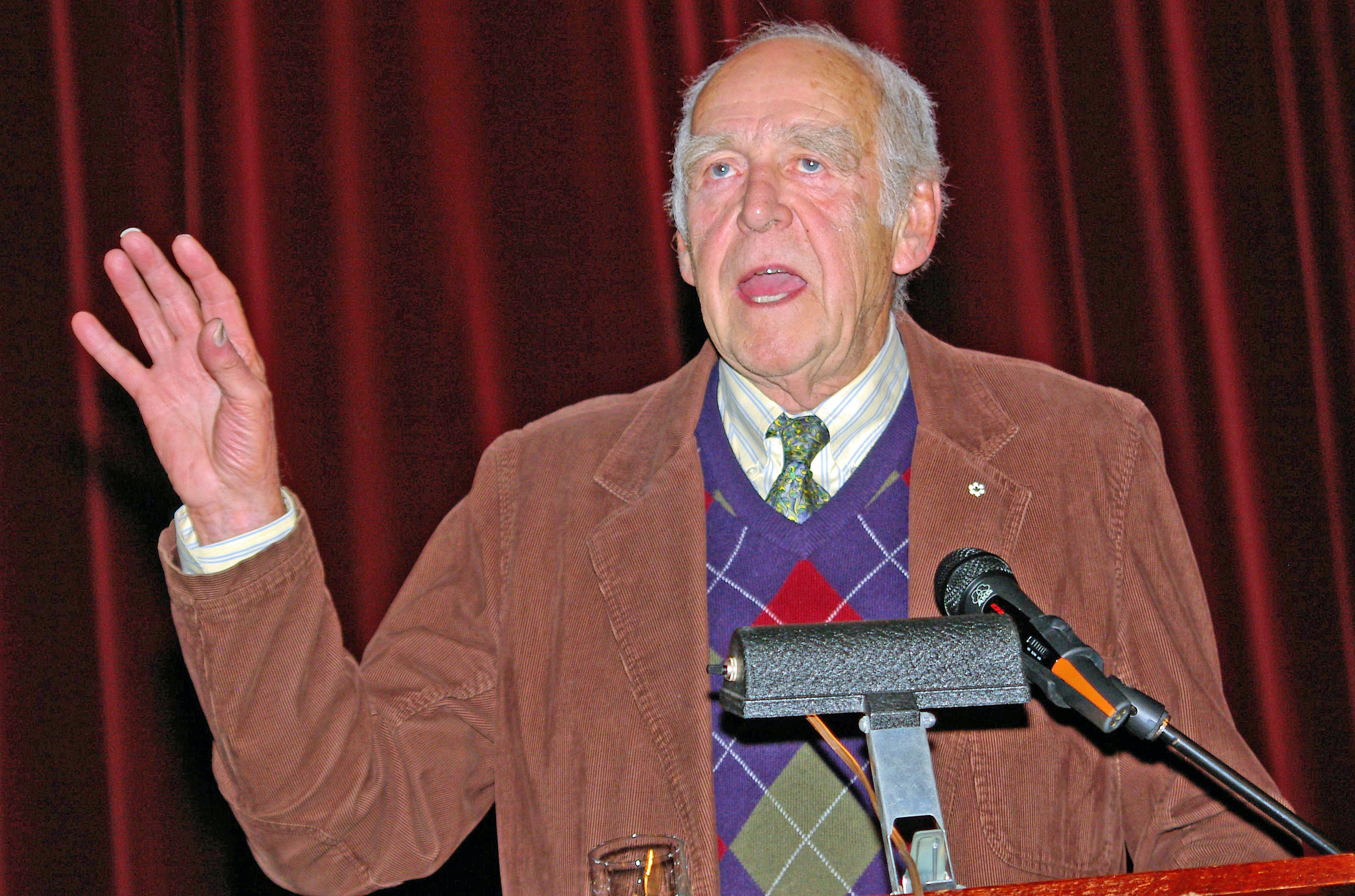
Paul Almond

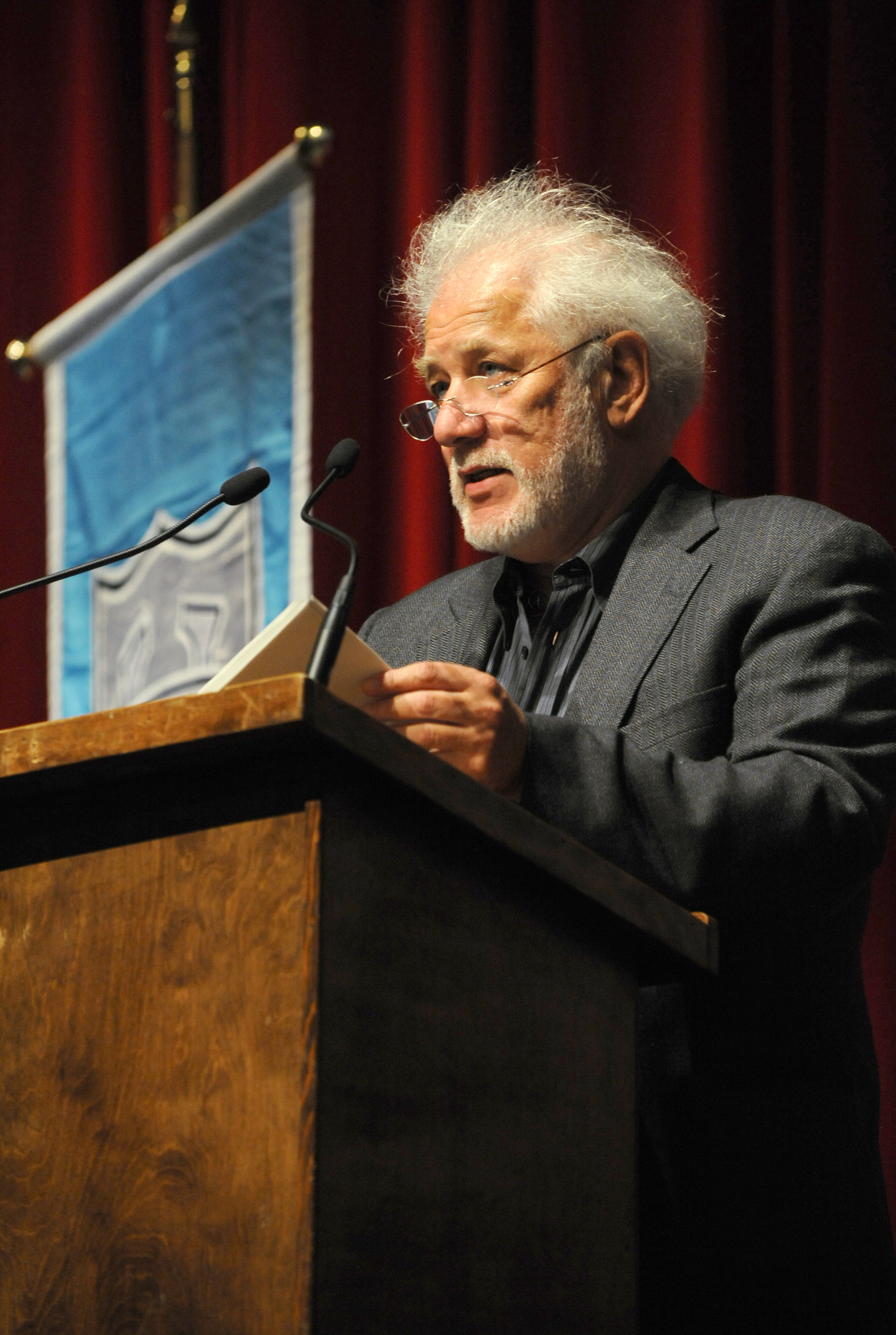
Michael Ondaatje

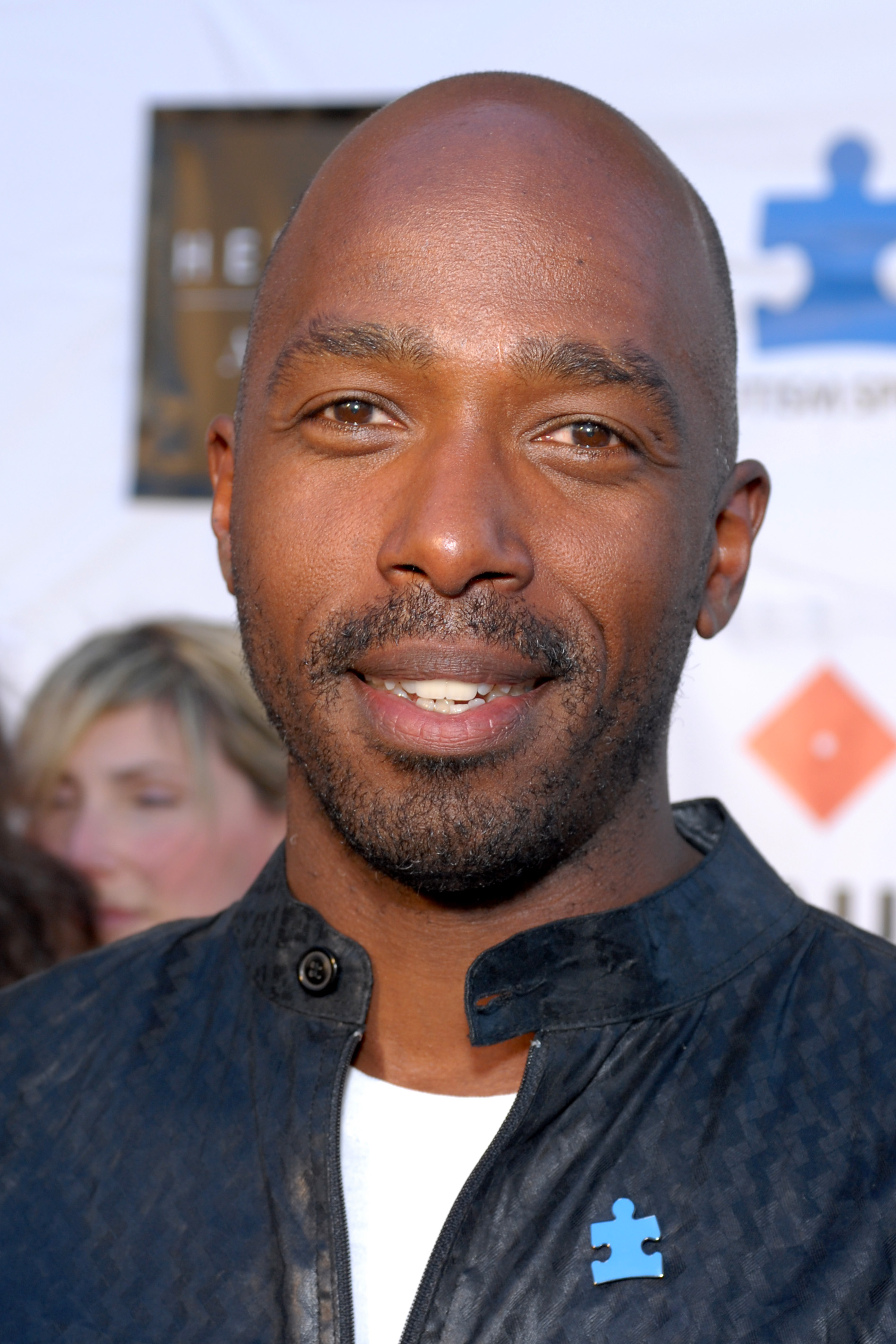
Ntare Mwine

- Jake Eberts OC (1941–2012), award-winning film producer of Chariots of Fire, Gandhi, Dances with Wolves & Chicken Run. He has been associated with films garnering 66 Oscar nominations, including nine for Best Picture. In 2006, March of the Penguins won the Oscar for Best Documentary.
- Richard Smeaton White PC CC OOnt (1865–1936) was a Canadian newspaper publisher and political figure. He sat for Inkerman Division in the Senate of Canada as a Conservative from 1917 to 1936.
- Ralph Barker Gustafson, CM (1909–1995) was a Canadian poet and professor at Bishop's University.
- John Calder (1927–2018) was a Scottish-Canadian writer who founded the company Calder Publishing in 1949.
- Sharon Pollock (1928-2021) Canadian Playwright, an officer of the Order of Canada and Fellow of the Royal Society of Canada.
- Clive M. Law(1954–2017) was a Canadian publisher and author, and founder and President of Service Publications.
- John Glassco (1909–1981) was a Canadian poet, memoirist and novelist. According to Stephen Scobie, "Glassco will be remembered for his brilliant autobiography, his elegant, classical poems, and for his translations." He is also remembered by some for his erotica.
- David Atkinson (1921–2012), Broadway actor and singer. He also served in the Royal Canadian Air Force during World War II in the South Pacific just prior to Japan's surrender.
- Norman Webster OC (1941–) A Canadian journalist and a former editor-in-chief of The Globe and Mail and The Gazette.
- George Hurst (1926–2012), Chief Conductor of the BBC Philharmonic; visiting professor at the Royal Academy of Music in London.
- Giles Walker (1946–2020) Scottish-Canadian film director, staff director at the National Film Board of Canada for 20 years and recipient of an Oscar nomination for a short drama.
- Stuart McLean OC (1948–2017) Celebrated Canadian radio broadcaster, humorist, monologist, and author, best known as the host of the CBC Radio program, The Vinyl Cafe.
- Michael Ondaatje OC FRSL (1943–) He is the recipient of multiple literary awards such as the Governor General's Award, the Giller Prize, the Booker Prize, and the Prix Médicis étranger. and recognized for his nationally and internationally successful novel The English Patient (1992). He also funds the Ondaatje Endeavour camping trips for BCS students.
- Ntare Mwine (1967–) an American stage and film actor, documentarian and activist who has appeared in such high-profile productions as Blood Diamond, Law & Order, Heroes and CSO, and Crime Scene Investigation with legendary producer Steven Soderbergh.
- Filipes Antônio da Silva Baptista Tou, otherwise known as 杜俊玮, Macanese singer. Winner of over four seasons of TDM (Macau), Teledifusão de Macau, S. A. Competitions.
- Scott Abbott co-inventor of the board game Trivial Pursuit.

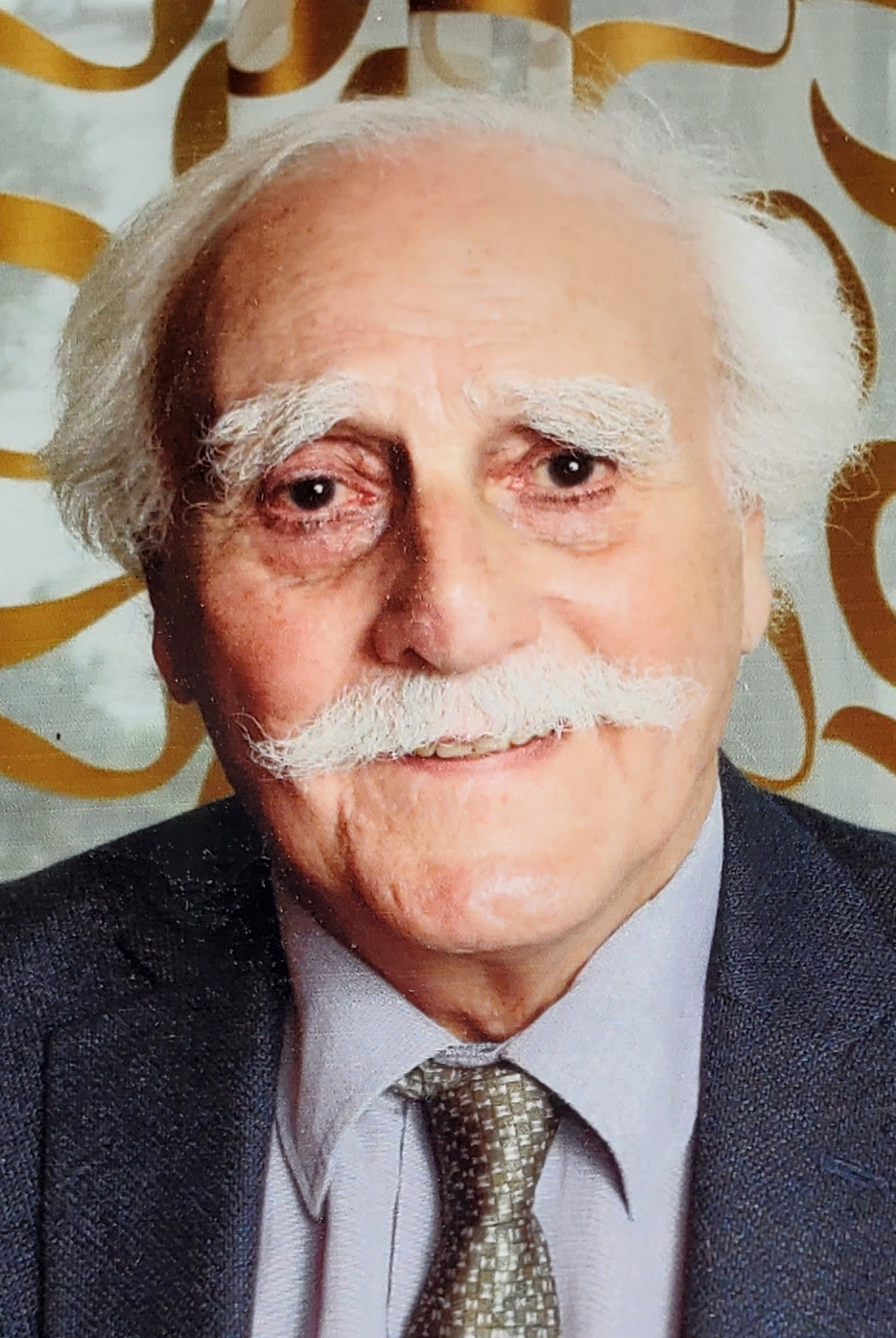
Howard Ryshpan, actor

- Howard Ryshpan (1932–) Canadian actor in radio, films, television and theatre.
- Paul Almond OC (1931–2015) Director of BBC documentary Up series or Seven-up！
- Robert Bédard (1931– ) is a Canadian former tennis player. Bédard was the top-ranked Canadian singles player for most of the 1950s and early 1960s. Headmaster of St. Andrew's College.
- Diana Fowler LeBlanc, CC (born 1940 in Toronto) is the widow of former Governor General of Canada, Roméo LeBlanc, during whose term she was Viceregal consort. She was stationed at the Paris offices of Radio-Canada and then the London office of CBC.

== Military service ==
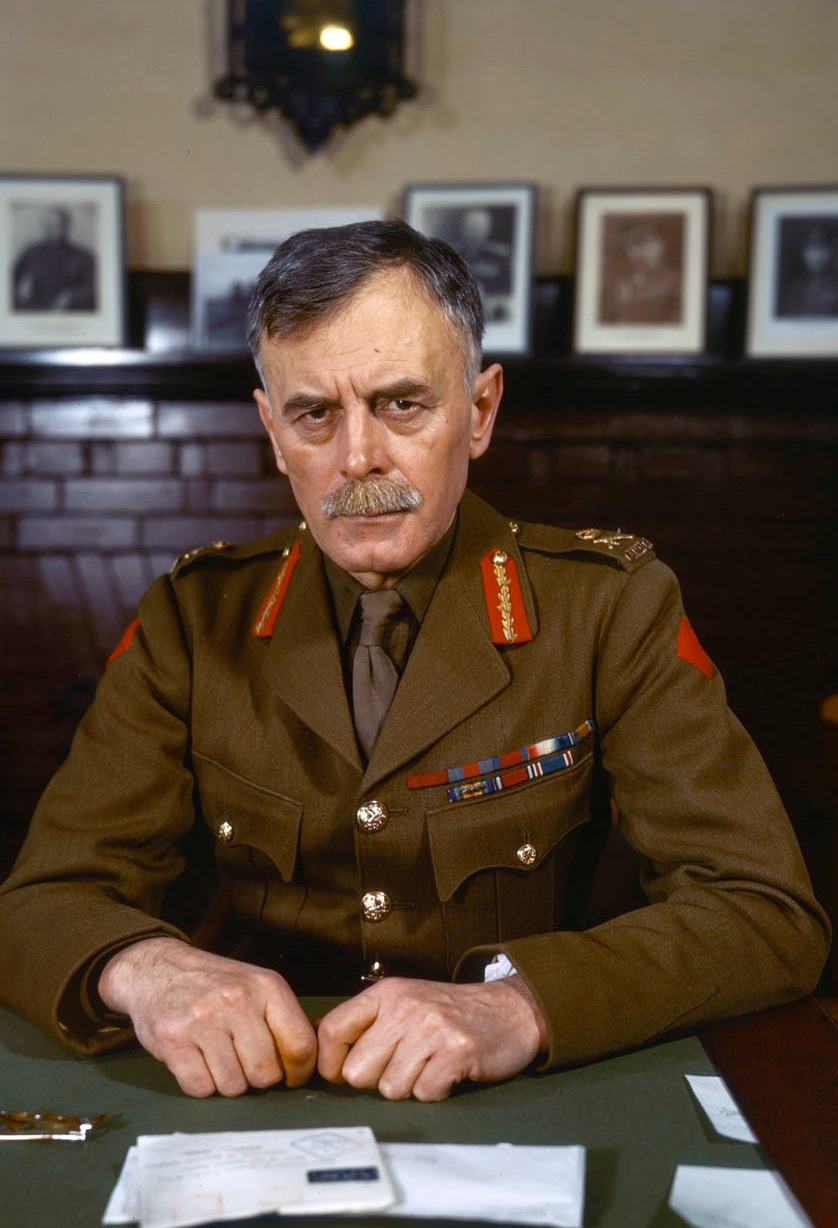
General Andrew McNaughton BCS'01

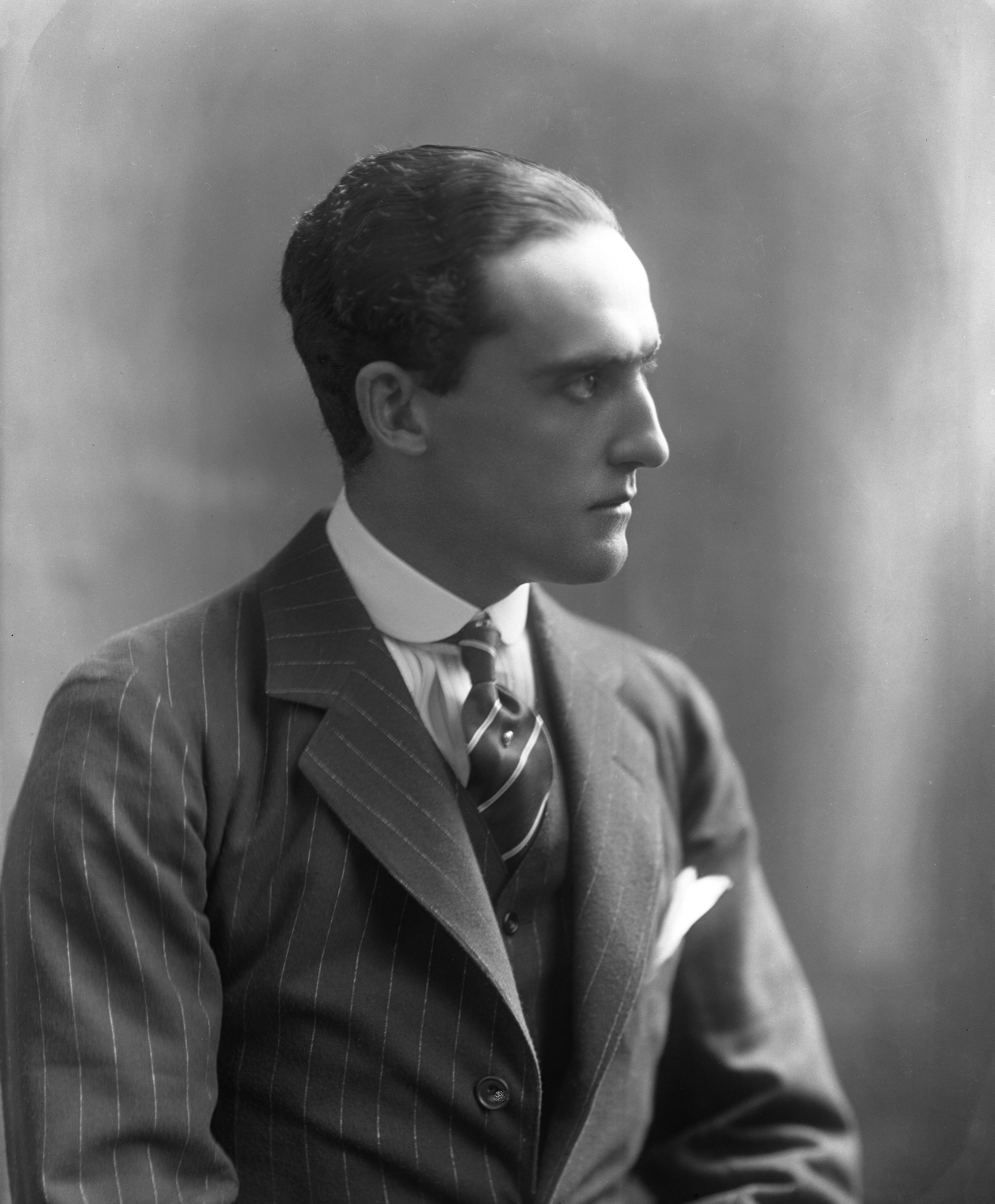
The Right Hon.Andrew Hamilton Gault

- General Andrew McNaughton CH CB CMG DSO CD PC (1887–1966), First commander of the First Canadian Army in the Second World War, Minister of National Defense, and Canadian Ambassador to the United Nations
- George Harold Baker (November 4, 1877 – June 2, 1916) was a lawyer, political figure, and soldier from Quebec, Canada. He represented Brome in the House of Commons of Canada, from 1911 to 1916, as a Conservative Member of Parliament. A bronze statue of him was erected in the Canadian Parliament Building. He is the only sitting Canadian MP to be killed in action on military service.
- Lieutenant General Kenneth Stuart CB DSO MC (September 9, 1891 – November 3, 1945) was a Canadian soldier and Chief of the General Staff, the head of the Canadian Army from 24 December 1941 until 27 December 1943.
- Major General William Henry Pferinger Elkins CB CBE DSO (13 June 1883 – 1964) was a Canadian soldier. He was a Commandant of the RMC.
- Major General Harry Wickwire Foster CBE, DSO (1902–1964) A senior Canadian Army officer who commanded two Canadian divisions during World War II. He served in both the Pacific and European theatres.
- John H. C. McGreevy (1913–2004) was a member of the Order of Canada and a recipient of the Queen Elizabeth II Golden Jubilee Medal. He was a leading figure in the Anglophone community of Quebec City, rewarded for his community service and recognized for his military service in the Second World War as prisoner of war for four years while serving as a lieutenant with the Royal Rifles of Canada in Hong Kong.
- Knight Frederick Oscar Warren Loomis KCB CMG DSO commander of the Royal Highlanders of Canada who also led the 3rd Canadian Division during the last two months of the First World War as a major-general. Mount Loomis in Alberta is named after him.
- Robert Moncel OC DSO OBE CD (1917– 2007) was a Canadian army officer. Moncel was Lieutenant-General of the Canadian Army and former Vice Chief of the Defence Staff. He was the youngest general officer in the Canadian Army when promoted to Brigadier on 17 August 1944, at the age of 27.
- Sir William Price (1867–1924), Quebec businessman and politician. One of the organizers for the Valcartier Military Camp (now CFB Valcartier) where BCS students start their year with the Cadet Orientation Camp. There are five generations of the Price family who studied at BCS.
- Sir Hugh Allan, father of Lieutenant-Colonel Sir H. Montagu Allan, was a Scottish-Canadian shipping magnate, financier and capitalist. By the time of his death, the Allan Shipping Line had become the largest privately owned shipping empire in the world. He was responsible for transporting millions of British immigrants to Canada, and the businesses that he established from Montreal filtered across every sphere of Canadian life, cementing his reputation as an empire builder.
- The Right Honourable Brigadier General Andrew Hamilton Gault DSO (1882~1958), at his own expense he raised the still existing Princess Patricia's Canadian Light Infantry, the last privately raised Regiment in the British Empire. He also served as a Member of Parliament (UK) for Taunton and as a Black Watch Officer.
- General Sir Henry Edward Burstall (1870–1945), commander of the 2nd Canadian Division in the First World War.
- William Heneker KCB, KCMG, DSO (1867–1939), one of only a handful of Canadians to reach the full rank of General in the British Army.
- Commander J. K. L. Ross CBE (1876–1951), sportsman, philanthropist and Deputy Governor of Jamaica; he funded the construction of the new campus for BCS in 1916-17.
- Lieutenant-General Sir George Norton Cory, KBE, CB, DSO (26 December 1874 – 17 November 1968) was an American-born Canadian soldier who served with the British Army in India, South Africa and Canada and during the Boer War, World War I and World War II.

== Legal ==
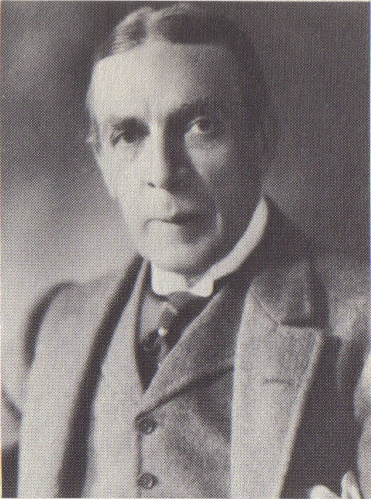
F.E. Meredith

- George Carlyle Marler, PC (14 September 1901 – 10 April 1981) was a politician, notary and philatelist in Quebec, Canada. Marler served as city councillor from 1940 to 1947 and as Deputy Chairman of Montreal Executive Committee in Montreal. Leader of the Official Opposition of the Quebec National Assembly against the Union Nationale.
- James Kirkpatrick Stewart is a Canadian lawyer with over thirty years of experience as Crown counsel handling criminal trials and appeals for the prosecution, including more than eight years working with the United Nations in international criminal law prosecutions as a trial and appellate counsel and legal manager. In the past, he has served as Senior Trial Attorney in the Office of the Prosecutor (OTP) at the International Criminal Tribunal for Rwanda (ICTR); as Chief of Prosecutions in the OTP at the International Criminal Tribunal for the former Yugoslavia (ICTY); and as Senior Appeals Counsel and then Chief of the Appeals and Legal Advisory Division in the OTP at the ICTR.
- Frederick Edmund Meredith KC (1862–1941), lawyer, Chancellor of Bishop's University and president of the Montreal Victorias, Bâtonnier of the Bar of Montreal
- Roy Heenan, OC (28 September 1935 – 3 February 2017) was a Canadian labour lawyer and academic. He was the founding partner of the Canadian law firm Heenan Blaikie.

== Political figures ==
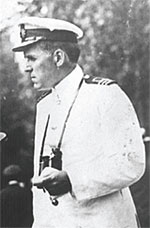
Commander J.K.L. Ross of Montreal

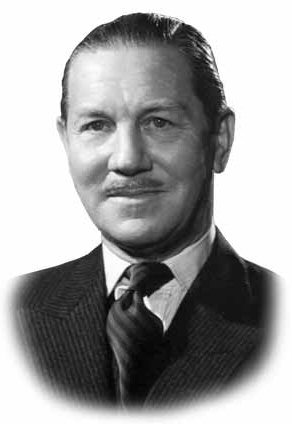
Hartland de Montarville Molson

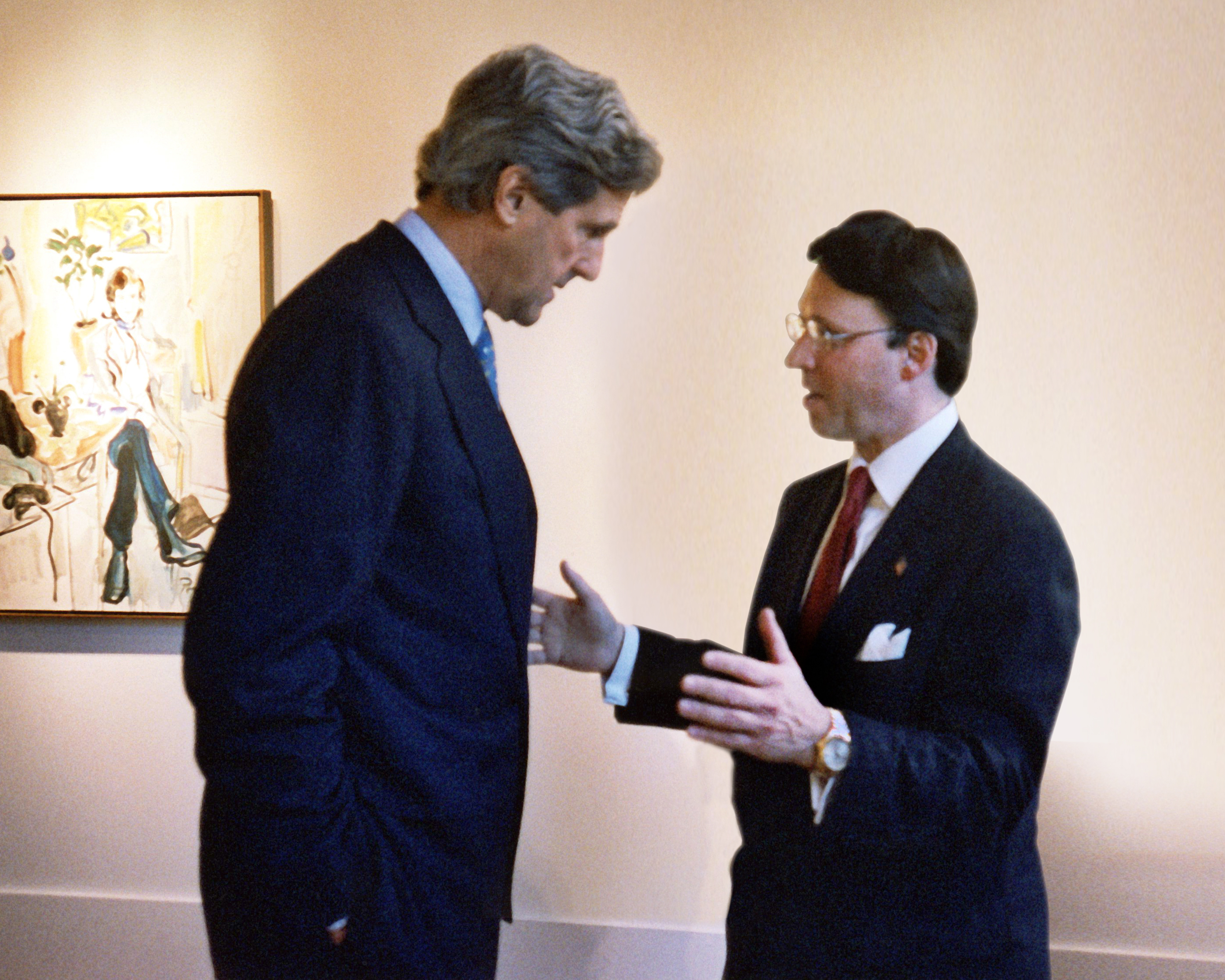
US Secretary of State, John Kerry and Derek Bryson Park; Beacon Hill, Boston, Massachusetts.

- Sir James David Edgar KCMG PC QC (August 10, 1841 – July 31, 1899) 7th Speaker of the House of Commons of Canada, and was given a knighthood by Queen Victoria. (Lennoxville Classical School Era)
- Richard Smeaton White PC CC OOnt (1865–1936) was a Canadian newspaper publisher and political figure. He sat for Inkerman division in the Senate of Canada as a Conservative from 1917 to 1936.
- General Andrew McNaughton CH CB CMG DSO CD PC (1887–1966), Canadian Minister of National Defense in the Second World War; Ambassador to the United Nations
- Elliott Torrance Galt (1850–1928) Only child of the Fathers of Confederation Sir Alexander Tilloch Galt (1817–1893) by his wife Elliott. A major figure in the financing and establishment of Lethbridge, Alberta, building 571 kilometres of irrigation canals and establishing coal mines with a daily capacity of over 2,000 tonnes
- Loran Ellis Baker Member of the Liberal Party in the riding of Shelburne—Yarmouth—Clare (21 September 1905 – 9 May 1991)
- John Smythe Hall (7 August 1853 – 8 January 1909) was a Canadian lawyer, politician, and editor. Member of the Legislative Assembly of Quebec for Montréal-Ouest
- John H. C. McGreevy CM (1913–2004) was a member of the Order of Canada and a recipient of the Queen Elizabeth II Golden Jubilee Medal. He was a leading figure in the Anglophone community of Quebec City, rewarded for his community service and recognized for his military service in the Second World War as prisoner of war for four years while serving as a lieutenant with the Royal Rifles of Canada in Hong Kong
- Tim Jones Former Mayor of Aurora, Ontario.
- Egan Chambers (1921~1944) Member of the Canadian Parliament for St. Lawrence—St. George.
- 2nd Lord Shaughnessy KC, William James Shaughnessy, (1883–1938), He was director of Canadian Pacific Railway.
- 3rd Lord Shaughnessy, William Graham Shaughnessy,(1922–2003), member of the House of Lords; Major in the Canadian Grenadier Guards.
- Sir William Price (1867–1924), Quebec businessman and politician. One of the organizers for the Valcartier Military Camp (now CFB Valcartier) where BCS students start their year with the Cadet Orientation Camp. There is five generations of the Price family who studied in BCS.
- John W. H. Bassett OC (1915–1998) was a Canadian media proprietor and politician. He is also a recipient of the Order of Canada.
- The Hon. Matthew Henry Cochrane (11 November 1823 – 12 August 1903) was a Canadian industrialist, livestock breeder, and politician. Cochrane, Alberta is named in his honour.
- The Right Hon. Greville Janner, Lord Baron Janner (1928–2015) British politician, barrister
- Walter George Mitchell KC (1877–1935), member of the House of Commons of Canada; Treasurer of the Province of Quebec
- Clarence Chester Cleveland (September 14, 1849 – January 6, 1907) member of the House of Commons of Canada for the riding of Richmond—Wolfe in the 1891 federal election defeating future Liberal Prime Minister of Canada Wilfrid Laurier (who also ran in the riding of Quebec East).
- Senator Hartland de Montarville Molson OC, OBE, OQ (1907–2002), of the Molson Brewery and former owner of the Montreal Canadiens
- The Hon. Colin Kenny (1943–) Canadian senator. A member of the Liberal Party.
- Lucien Turcotte Pacaud, (1879–1960) member of the House of Commons of Canada & acting Canadian High Commissioner to the United Kingdom
- Commander J. K. L. Ross CBE (1876–1951), sportsman, philanthropist and Deputy Governor of Jamaica; he funded the construction of the new campus of BCS
- Derek Bryson Park Director of the Federal Home Loan Bank of New York and served as managing director in the Fixed Income/Structured Finance Division at Lehman Brothers.
- Diana Fowler LeBlanc, CC (born 1940 in Toronto) is the widow of former Governor General of Canada, Roméo LeBlanc, during whose term she was a Viceregal consort. She stationed at the Paris offices of Radio-Canada and then the London office of CBC. (King's Hall)
- F. R. ScottCC QC FRSC FBA (1899–1985), co-founder of first Canadian social democratic party, the Co-operative Commonwealth Federation, and its successor, the New Democratic Party. He also won the Governor General Award for his literary achievements.
- Lieutenant General Sir Louis Jean Bols KCB KCMG DSO (23 November 1867 – 13 September 1930) was a British Army General, he served as Edmund Allenby's Third Army Chief of Staff on the Western front and Sinai and Palestine campaigns of World War I. He was also the governor of Bermuda.
- Joseph Bell Forsyth (1830–1913) Il est le premier maire de Cap-Rouge.
- Raymond Setlakwe (1928-2021) Canadian senator for The Laurentides, Recipient of the Order of Canada.

== Business ==
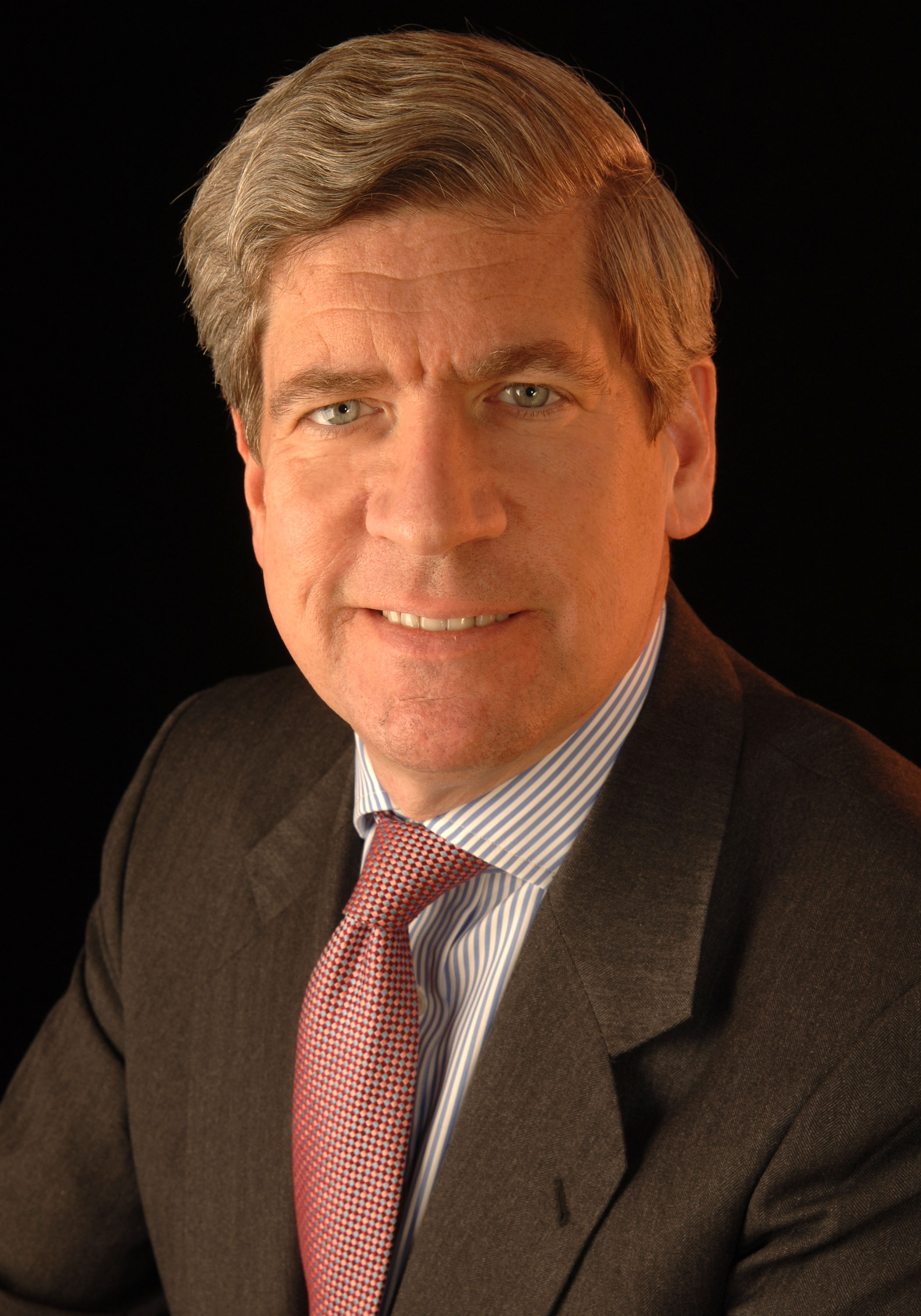
Anthony R. Graham

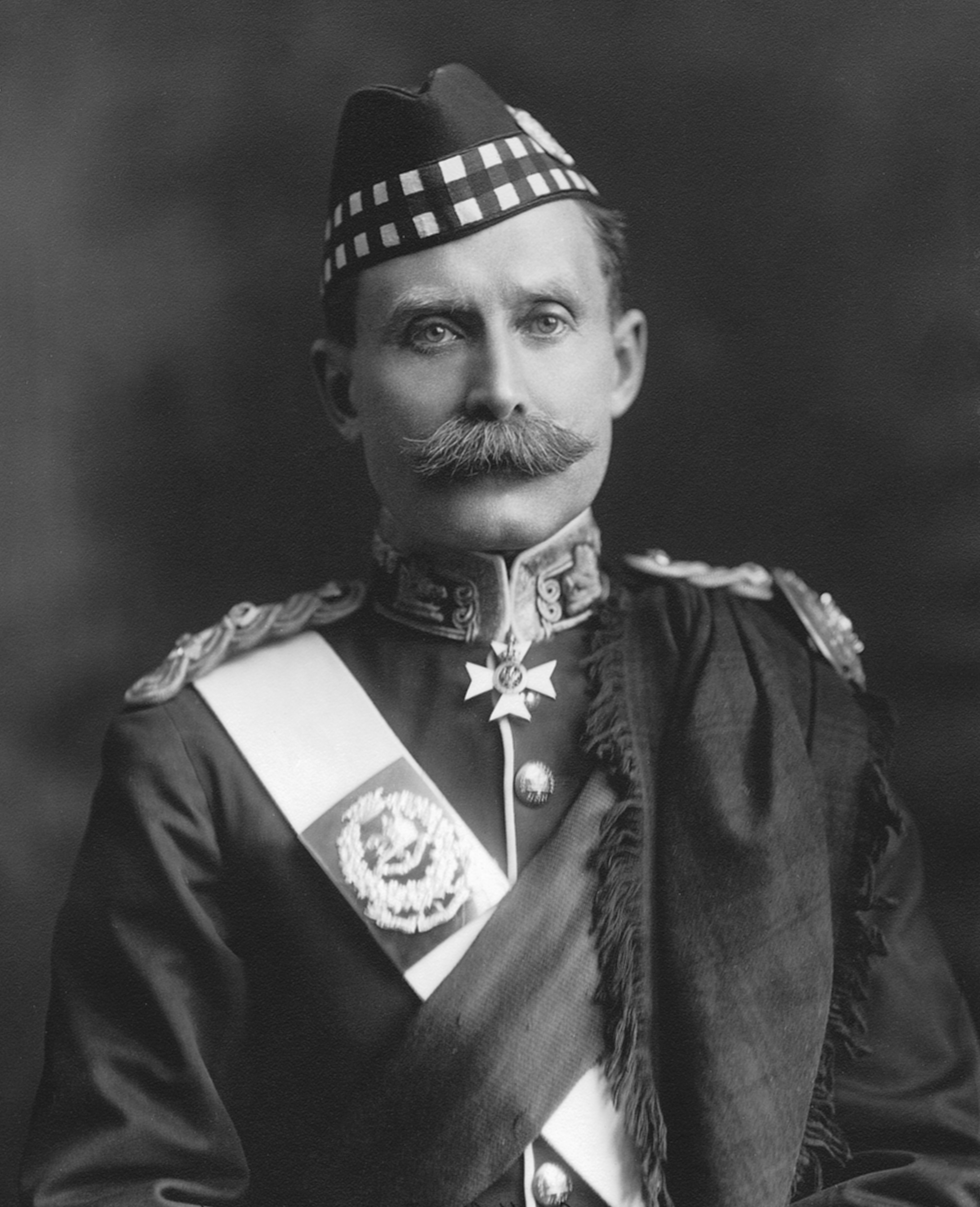
Sir Montagu Allan

- Anthony Graham (1957– ) Director of George Weston Limited (1996–2016), Loblaw Companies (1998–2015), Chairman of President's Choice Bank (2000–2015), President of Selfridges Group (2003–2017) and Chairman of Choice Properties REIT(2017–present).
- Lieutenant-Colonel Sir H. Montagu Allan CVO (1860–1951), of the Allan Shipping Line; donated the Allan Cup to Ice Hockey He was president of several major Canadian financial institutions and of the Montreal General Hospital. He co-founded and was president of the Ritz-Carlton Hotel in Montreal.
- The Hon. Matthew Henry Cochrane (11 November 1823 – 12 August 1903) was a Canadian industrialist, livestock breeder, and politician. Cochrane, Alberta is named in his honour.
- Hartland MacDougall (1875–1947), stockbroker and member of Canada's Sports Hall of Fame
- Eric Herbert Molson OC (born 1937) C.M., former chairman of Molson Coors and former Chancellor of Concordia University
- Edward Bronfman, OC (1 November 1927 – 4 April 2005) was a Canadian businessman, philanthropist, and member of the Bronfman family. From 1971 to 1978, he and his brother owned the Montreal Canadiens. The team won four Stanley Cups under their ownership, in 1973, 1976, 1977 and 1978.
- Senator Hartland de Montarville Molson OC, OBE, OQ (1907–2002), of the Molson Brewery and former owner of the Montreal Canadiens
- Derek Bryson Park Director of the Federal Home Loan Bank of New York and served as managing director in the Fixed Income/Structured Finance Division at Lehman Brothers.
- Arthur Deane Nesbitt OBE, DFC, CdeG (16 November 1910 – 22 February 1978) was a Canadian businessman and a decorated pilot and Wing Commander in World War II. Under his guidance, Nesbitt Thomson expanded across Canada, and into the United States and Europe. They were the first Canadian firm in three decades to obtain a seat on the New York Stock Exchange.
- Jackson Dodds, CBE,(1881–1961) Dodds had a distinguished career with the Bank of Montreal where he was general manager before his retirement. Dodds' image appeared on the paper currency of the Bank of Montreal in 1931, 1935, and 1938 (during the time he was general manager).

== Religion ==
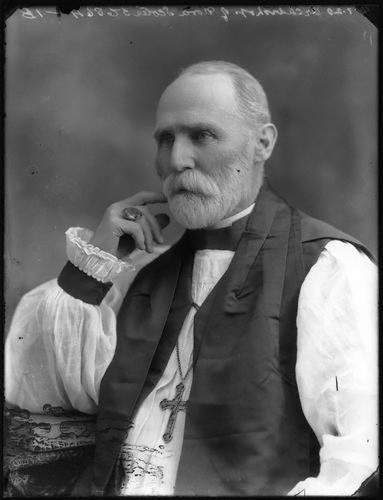
Clarendon Lamb Worrell

- Clarendon Worrell (20 July 1854 – 10 August 1934) was the 5th Primate of the Anglican Church of Canada.
- Edward John Bidwell (26 November 1866 – 11 August 1941) was an English Anglican clergyman, who served as Bishop of Ontario from 1917 to 1926.
- James Williams (bishop) (1825–1892) graduated from Pembroke College, Oxford. He participated vigorously in the development of the Protestant public school system in Québec and collaborated with Sir Alexander Galt in drawing up Section 93 of the British North American Act (Constitution Act, 1867) which conferred upon Parliament the responsibility of protecting the educational rights of minorities.
- The Rt Rev Lennox Waldron Williams, DD (12 November 1859 – 8 July 1958)educated at St John's College, Oxford, was an eminent Anglican priest, the sixth Anglican Bishop of Quebec.(alumni and former headmaster)
- Tim Matthews (1907–1991) was the ninth Bishop of Quebec.

== Sports ==
BCS Hockey Program was established in 1914 and the BCS Memorial Arena is the oldest indoor rink in Canada donated by the alumni.

- Ernest McLea (1876–1931) was a Canadian ice hockey player. McLea played in the 1890s for the Montreal Victorias and was a member of four Stanley Cup-winning teams. He scored the first hat trick in Stanley Cup play, and scored the Stanley Cup-winning goal in a challenge game in 1896.
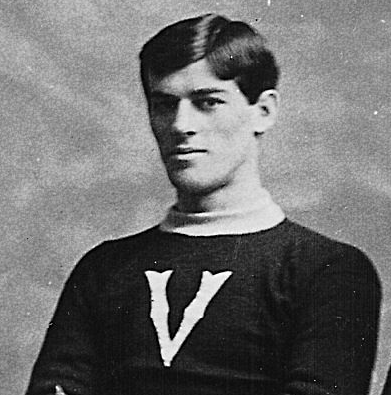
  Hartland MacDougall
- Hartland MacDougall (1875–1947), stockbroker and member of Canada's Sports Hall of Fame.
- Christopher Temple Emmet (1868–1957) was an American attorney and sportsman.
- Edward Bronfman, OC (1 November 1927 – 4 April 2005) was a Canadian businessman, philanthropist, and member of the Bronfman family. From 1971 to 1978, he and his brother owned the Montreal Canadiens. The team won four Stanley Cups under their ownership, in 1973, 1976, 1977, and 1978.
- Senator Hartland de Montarville Molson OC, OBE, OQ (1907–2002), of the Molson Brewery and former owner of the Montreal Canadiens
- Tom Nütten (pronounced [ˈnʏtən]; 1971–) is a former American football guard who played eight seasons in the National Football League (NFL) with the St. Louis Rams.
- Catherine Boudreault, (1997-) Canadian Rugby Seven player, a silver medal winner at 2014 Summer Youth Olympics.
- Dawson Mercer (2001–) Canadian hockey player that was drafted 18th overall by the New Jersey Devils in the 2020 NHL entry draft.
- Noah Dobson (2000–) A Canadian professional ice hockey defenceman for the Montreal Canadiens of NHL.
