= John H. C. McGreevy =

Canadian activist

John H. C. McGreevy CM (1913–2004) was a member of the Order of Canada in 1988 and a recipient of the Queen Elizabeth II Golden Jubilee Medal. He was a leading figure in the Anglophone community of Quebec City, rewarded for his community service and recognized for his military service in the Second World War as prisoner of war for four years while serving as a lieutenant with the Royal Rifles of Canada in Hong Kong

Educated at Bishop's College School from 1923 to 1931, where he was head boy and literary editor of the magazine, he pursued a career as an accountant with McDonald Currie, a precursor firm of PricewaterhouseCoopers and where he was a partner in their Quebec City office. He led such varied institutions as the Quebec Ladies’ Home Foundation, where he was president; Jeffrey Hale Hospital, where he served on the board and was instrumental in the creation of McGreevy Manor, a charitable, seniors' apartment complex in Quebec City, meeting the housing needs of elderly members of the English speaking community; and the Literary and Historical Society of Quebec, where he was president. Other roles in the Quebec City community included serving as president and treasurer of the St. Brigid's Home Foundation, treasurer of the Maurice Pollack Foundation, president of the Quebec Garrison Club, commissioner on the National Battlefields Commission, and treasurer of the Anglican Diocese of Quebec, where he kept an office in his retirement.

== See also ==
- List of Bishop's College School alumni
