= Richard Smeaton White =

Canadian politician

The Hon. Richard Smeaton White

Senator for Inkerman, Quebec
- In office 1917–1936
- Appointed by: Robert Borden
- Preceded by: William Owens
- Succeeded by: Adrian Knatchbull-Hugessen

Personal details
- Born: March 17, 1865 Hamilton, Canada West
- Died: December 17, 1936 (aged 71) Montreal, Quebec, Canada
- Party: Conservative

Richard Smeaton White (March 17, 1865 – December 17, 1936) was a Canadian newspaper publisher and political figure. He sat for Inkerman division in the Senate of Canada as a Conservative from 1917 to 1936.

He was born in Hamilton, Ontario in 1865, the son of Richard White and Jean Riddel, and was educated in Montreal and at Bishop's College. He was publisher of the Montreal Gazette and editor from 1886 to 1896. White was also director of Stelco, the International Paper Company, the Anglo-American Paper Company and the Montreal Trust Company. He never married.

White died in office in 1936 in Montreal. The town of Smeaton, Saskatchewan was named after him.

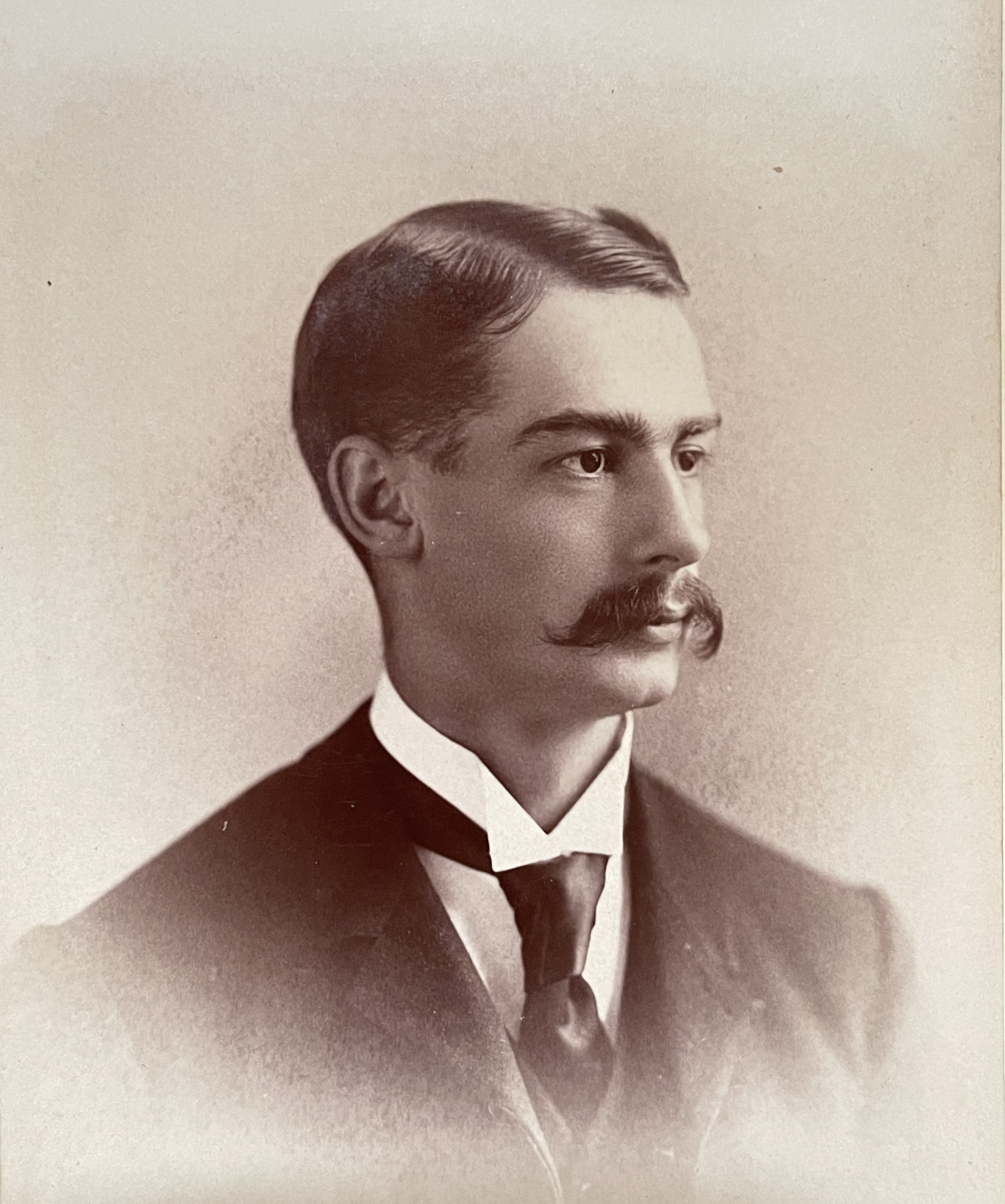
Richard Smeaton White

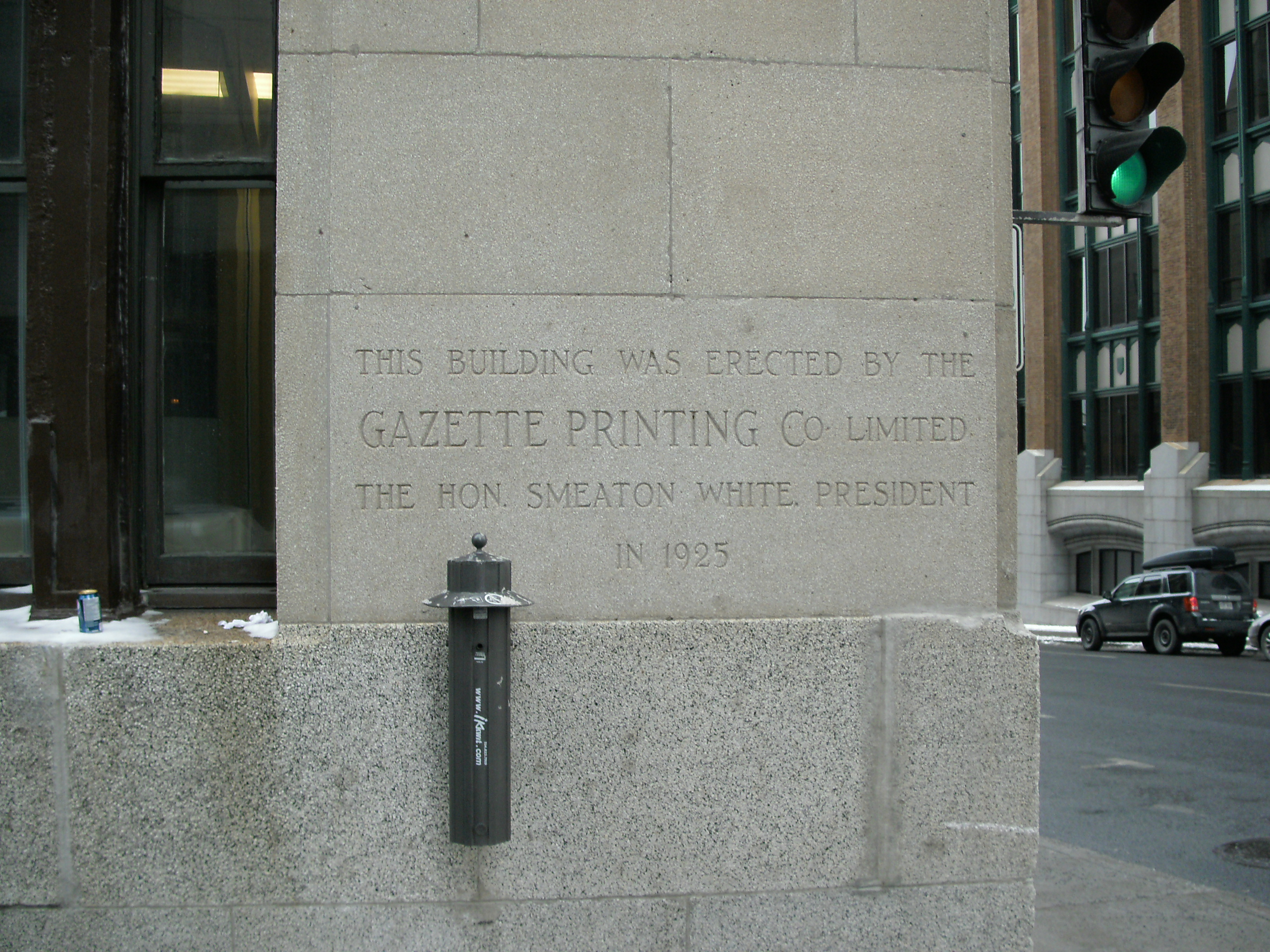
Cornerstone of the former Gazette building at 1000 Saint-Antoine Street West, erected in 1925 while White was the Gazette's president.

== See also ==
- List of Bishop's College School alumni
- Photograph of Mr. White by William Notman
