= Kew-Forest School =

Coordinates: 40°42′49″N 73°50′0″W

The Kew-Forest School

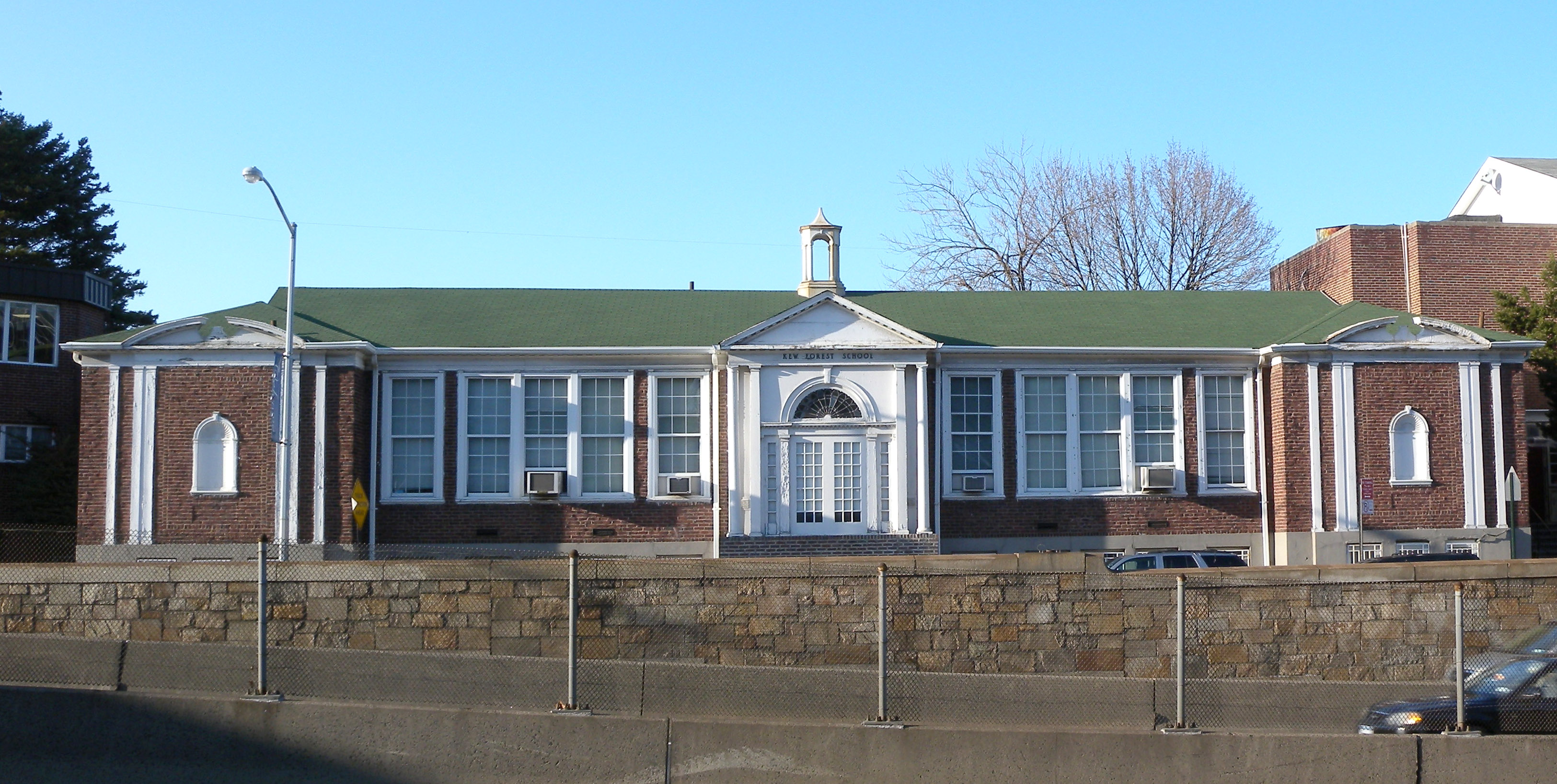

Location
- 119-17 Union Turnpike, Forest Hills, NY 11375; Forest Hills, New York

Information
- Type: Private; Independent; day; college-preparatory school
- Motto: "Ad Summum"
- Religious affiliation: Nonsectarian
- Established: 1918
- Founder: Louis D. Marriott
- Status: Open
- Chairman: Chris D’Amato
- Head of school: Tiffany D. Trotter
- Grades: Early Childhood Development (Preschool)–Grade 12
- Gender: Co-educational
- Enrollment: Approx. 247
- Campus: Urban
- Colors: Blue & Red
- Athletics: 7 Athletic teams
- Athletics conference: Private School Athletic Association (PSAA)
- Mascot: Jaguar
- Nickname: Jaguars
- Accreditation: NAIS; NYSAIS
- Yearbook: The Blotter
- Tuition: $31,500 (2026-27)
- Website: https://www.kewforest.org

The Kew-Forest School is an independent college preparatory school, located in Forest Hills, Queens, New York City, United States, for students in grades Preschool to Grade 12.

== History ==
What is today the neighborhoods of Forest Hills and Kew Gardens were both created in 1909 as housing developments. The only public school servicing the new developments was P.S. 101, however, it only ran from kindergarten to third grade. A group of wealthy locals engaged with Louis Durant Marriott and Guy Hinman Catlin, both teachers at the private St. Paul's School, to become co-headmasters of the new Kew-Forest School. A 2-acre plot of land was then purchased and three buildings constructed with the school openings its doors on September 25, 1918, offering education from kindergarten through high-school. Unlike many other private schools at the time, the Kew-Forest School started life co-educational.

== Headmasters ==
- Guy Hinman Catlin (co) 1918-1933
- Louis Durant Marriott: 1918-1941
- James L. Dixon: 1941-1960
- Wilson M. Johnson: 1960-1973
- Philip V. Rogers, Jr.: 1973-1999
- Peter S. Lewis: 2000-2009
- Mark Fish: 2009-2014
- Eric G. Ruoss: 2014-2017
- Carla MacMullen: 2017-2022
- Tiffany D. Trotter: 2022-present

== Notable alumni ==
- Hank Azaria, actor
- Maryanne Trump Barry, United States Appellate Judge and eldest sister of U.S. President, Donald Trump
- Peter Brant, industrialist
- Margaret Wise Brown, author
- Derek Bryson Park, Director of the Federal Home Loan Bank of New York
- Donald Trump, 45th and 47th president of the United States
- Katharine Weber, author and professor
- Gideon Yago, journalist
- James Gray, director
