= Derek Bryson Park =

American banker

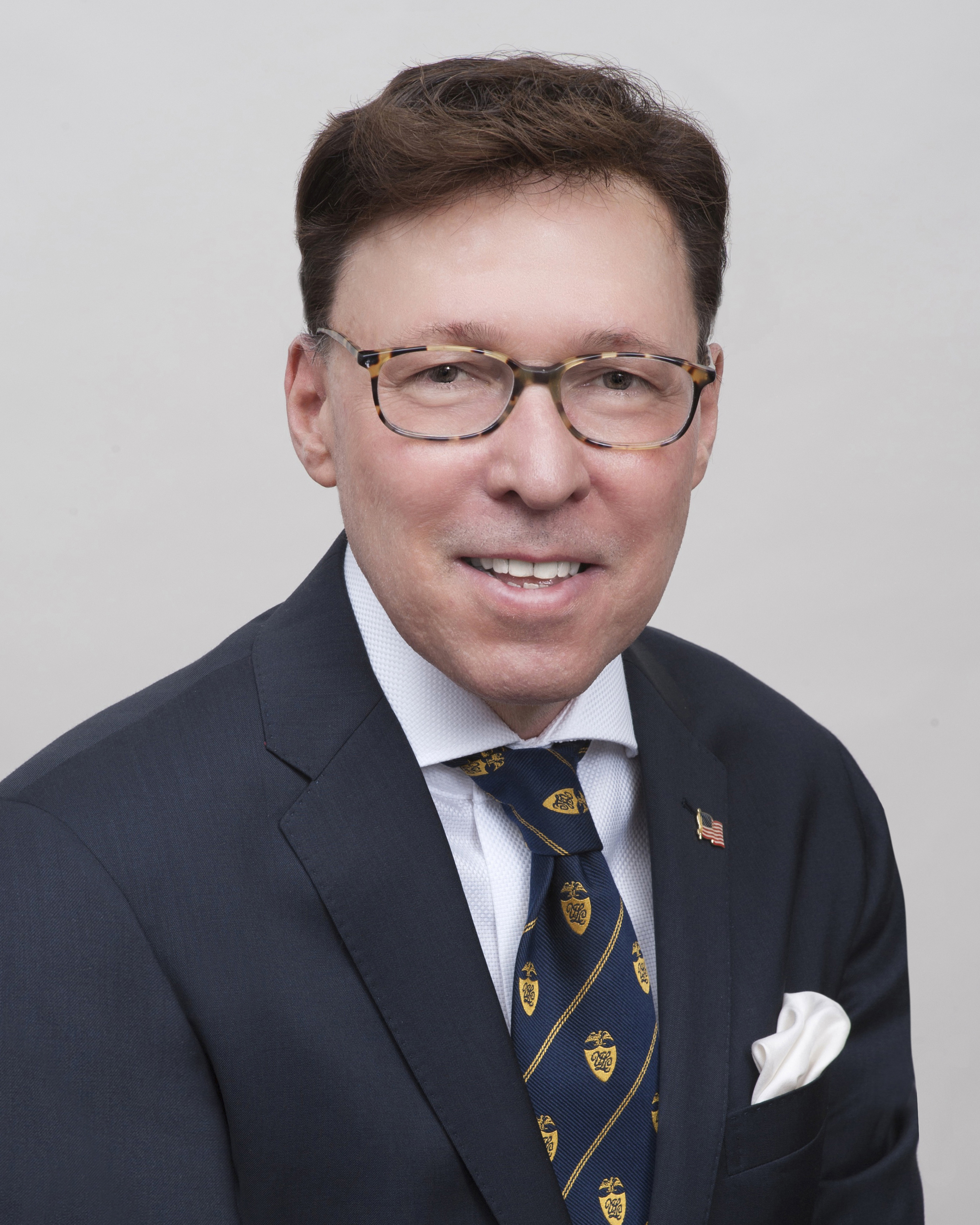
- Park in 2017

Director of the Federal Home Loan Bank of New York
- In office March 1999 – December 2002
- President: Bill Clinton, George W. Bush

Personal details
- Born: New York, NY, USA
- Party: Republican
- Education: Western University, New York University
- Profession: Financial services
- Awards: The State of New York Military Commendation Medal (2002); Honorary Citizen, Natchez, Mississippi (1985)
- Website: http://derekbrysonpark.com/

Derek Bryson Park (born April 11, 1956) is an American businessman and public servant. Park has held a number of public positions in his career, including director of the Federal Home Loan Banks, vice-chairman of New York City Industrial Development Agency and director of the New York City Economic Development Corporation.

Park has also worked in finance at several firms, including Cohane Rafferty Securities, Lehman Brothers and Wilmington Capital Securities.

== Early life and education ==
Park attended University of Western Ontario and earned a Bachelor of Arts degree in 1977. In 1979, he earned an MPA from New York University's Robert F. Wagner Graduate School of Public Service, and a Ph.D. from the New York University Graduate School of Arts and Science in 1982. While at NYU, Park was director of stadium operations of the US Open Tennis Championships at Flushing Meadows in 1979, and operations manager of the WCT Tournament of Champions in the early 1980s.

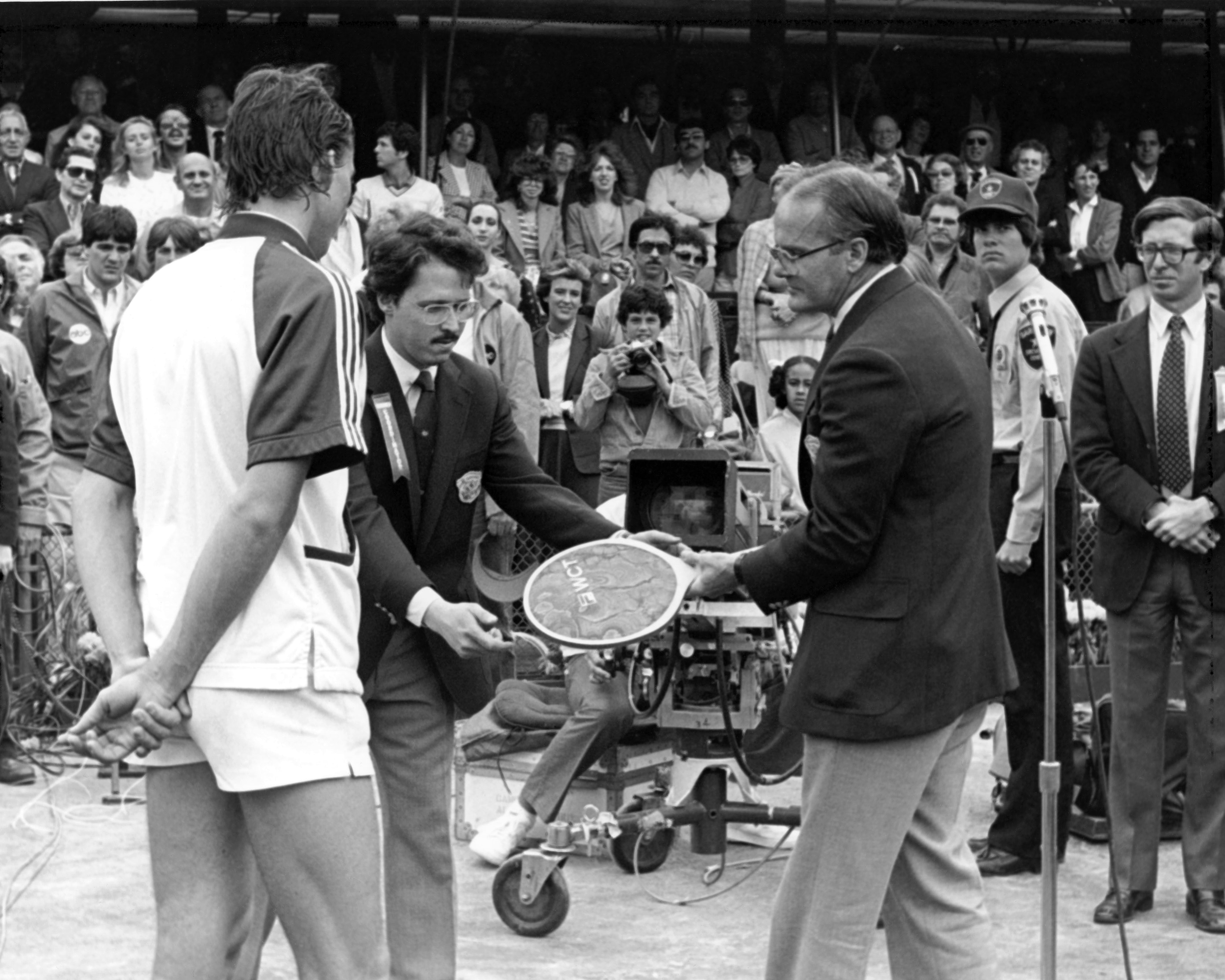
Left to right: Ivan Lendl, Park, and Lamar Hunt.

== Career ==
During the 1980s, Park worked at California-based Callon Petroleum Company. In 1983, Park served on the campaign staff for the then-Attorney General of Mississippi William Allain during his election to become Governor. From 1985 to 1988, he was at Interpublic Group, an advertising agency. In 1988, Park moved to Cohane Rafferty Securities, where he became managing director, and then worked at Lehman Brothers after the latter acquired Cohane Rafferty in 2002. He also served on the board of Southwest Security, the holding company of United Mississippi Bank.

In 1999, he was appointed by the Clinton administration to the Federal Home Loan Bank of New York as Director, and remained in the position into the George W. Bush administration until 2002. Park then went on to serve in other public positions in New York, including vice-chairman of the New York City Industrial Development Agency and as a Commissioner of the New York City Commission on Human Rights.

During his time as vice-chairman of the New York City Industrial Development Agency, Park collaborated with Randy Levine, president of the New York Yankees, and David Cohen, executive vice president of the New York Mets, to fund the construction of two new baseball stadiums in New York City. Both the Mets and Yankees received debt financing for their stadiums, totaling $1.6 billion. In 2006, The Bond Buyer recognized Park's achievements with the Bond Buyer of the Year award, alongside Levine and Cohen for their involvement.

In 2010, Park stepped down from his roles as Vice Chair at the IDA and at the NYC Capital Resource Corporation.

== See also ==
- List of Bishop's College School alumni
- New York University Robert F. Wagner Graduate School of Public Service
- Kew-Forest School
