= Diana Fowler LeBlanc =

Canadian politician

Diana Fowler LeBlanc CC (born 1940 in Toronto) is the widow of former Governor General of Canada, Roméo LeBlanc, during whose term she was a Viceregal consort.

During the 1960s she was in the broadcasting industry, stationed at the Paris offices of Radio-Canada and then the London office of CBC.

== Education ==
- King's Hall, Compton, Quebec (now Bishop's College School)
- 1959: University of Paris, French Civilization, diploma
- 1996: McGill University, Bachelor of Social Work

== Awards and recognition ==
- 1995: Companion of the Order of Canada and Dame of Justice of the Order of St. John, due to position as Viceregal consort (Governor General's Spouse).
- 1998: University of Ottawa, Honorary Doctorate

== Arms ==
Coat of arms of Diana Fowler LeBlanc

Crest
A coronet the upper rim set with maple leaves Argent alternating with thistle flowers Purpure
Escutcheon
Argent on a bend plumetty of eagle feathers Argent and Sable cotised Sable a mullet Argent fimbriated Purpure in canton the whole between two roses Purpure seeded Or barbed Vert
Supporters
Upon a rock proper set with maple saplings Argent leaved Purpure tipped with a fleur-de-lis Argent on either side a Siberian snow tiger winged of eagle wings all Argent and Sable armed Gules each gorged with a silk wreath Purpure and Argent pendant therefrom on the dexter an open book Argent bound Purpure on the sinister by a compass rose also Purpure
Motto
SUFFICIT VERITAS • ELIGITO TEMPUS
Latin: THE TRUTH SUFFICES • CHOOSE A WELL-CONSIDERED TIME

== See also ==
- List of Bishop's College School alumni

Honorary titles
Preceded by Gerda Hnatyshyn	Viceregal Consort of Canada; 1995–1999	Succeeded by John Ralston Saul
Order of precedence
Preceded by Mary Simon as Former Governor General	Canadian order of precedence as Widow of Governor General	Succeeded by Joe Clark as Former Prime Minister
