= Clive M. Law =

Canadian publisher and writer

Clive Law
- Born: Clive Michael Law; 12 May 1954; London, England, UK
- Died: 10 June 2017 (aged 63); Ottawa, Ontario, Canada
- Burial place: Beechwood Cemetery
- Spouse: Elizabeth Fournier-Law
- Children: 2
- Military career
- Allegiance: Canada
- Service years: 1971–1976
- Rank: Lieutenant
- Unit: Governor General's Foot Guards
- Awards
- Other work: Ran publisher of military books, became senior public servant, supported MINUSTAH peacekeeping

Clive Michael Law (1954–2017) was a Canadian publisher and author, and founder and President of Service Publications. He wrote and edited several books dealing with the Canadian military, including ground-breaking works on Canadian distinguishing patches worn since 1916, as well as the uniforms of the Canadian Expeditionary Force, and was the Canadian subject matter expert on the Canadian Inglis High-Power Pistol (Browning High-Power). As a senior public servant for the Government of Canada, he worked with Global Affairs Canada, the Royal Canadian Mounted Police and Transport Canada.

== Early life ==
Clive Law was born in London, England, on May 14, 1954. He emigrated to Canada at the age of four and became a Canadian citizen on March 5, 1971. He attended Bishop's College School where he participated in the Cadet movement, attaining the rank of Cadet Regimental Sergeant Major.

== Career and death ==
=== Military service ===
Law began his military service as a "Corporal Call-out" Staff Cadet on the establishment of the Regiment de Maisonneuve in June 1971. From September 1972 to April 1974, he was a Cadet Instructor List Officer with 2675 Royal Canadian Army Cadet Corps affiliated to 3rd Field Regiment (Royal Canadian Engineers). He officially enrolled in the Canadian Forces Primary Reserve on 23 May 1974, as an officer of the Governor General's Foot Guards. In 1976 he completed the Unit NBC Officer and Basic Parachutist courses before transferring to the Supplementary List in June 1976.

=== Service Publications ===
Service Publications (SP) was established in 1991 by Clive M. Law, an author and historian as well as former officer of the Governor General's Foot Guards. The company is devoted to the publication of books and periodicals regarding Canadian military subjects. SP sells books from other publishers as well as producing its own series of books. In addition to one-off titles by various authors, SP also releases titles as part of their own series of books, such as "Weapons of War" and "UpClose".

In addition, MilArt, an acronym for Military Artifact, was originally published as a paper newsletter from 1996 to 1999, at which time it went dormant due to Law's other commitments with Service Publications. Even though collectors of Canadian militaria are well served by two large, national, collectors' organizations (and countless local groups) Clive Law felt that ready access, via the web, to quality articles would benefit the Collector Historian community. Some articles featured have been written exclusively for MilArt while others have previously appeared in other media. MilArt allows for colour images, and more of them than is normally found in print journals. A number of categories have been established and more will be added as needed.

=== Death ===
Law died on 10 June 2017, aged 63, survived by two children (Kathleen and Richard (Geneviève)) and his wife, Elizabeth Fournier-Law. He was interred in Beechwood Cemetery, Ottawa with full military honours.

== Honours and awards ==

Law was awarded the Queen Elizabeth II Golden Jubilee Medal for his contributions to society. The medal was awarded in early 2003, in recognition of his publishing accomplishments. The medal was presented by Dr. Serge Bernier, Director, History and Heritage at the Department of National Defence.

In May 2005 Mr. Law was elected a Fellow of the Company of Military Historians. This US-based organisation boasts over 1500 members and produces one of the best collector-oriented magazines. The Company concentrates on the uniforms of the armies of the Americas as well as those worn by other countries while in the Americas. He was also the recipient of the Loren Miller Medal for a display of concentrating on the uniforms of the Canadian Guards that he exhibited at the annual meeting in Providence, Rhode Island.

In 2009, as a Senior Public Servant, Mr. Law was deployed to Haiti in support of OP MINUSTAH. He was presented with the UN medal for MINUSTAH with numeral 2. During his time on deployment, he was instrumental in being part of the establishment of the St John Ambulance First Aid, as the standard of the Haitian National Police.

Due to his help in creating a self-sustaining first aid program for the Haitian National Police, in 2010 Mr. Law was inducted as a Serving Member into the Order of St John, and was also presented with the Canadian Peacekeeping Service Medal by the Commissioner of the Royal Canadian Mounted Police. In 2012 he was presented the Queen's Diamond Jubilee Medal following nomination by the Organization of Military Museums of Canada. This was presented by Richard Pound, Honorary Colonel of the Canadian Grenadier Guards.

In 2015 he was presented with the Minister of Veterans Affairs Commendation. His citation reads:

Mr. Law is a United Nations (UN) Peacekeeping Veteran who served with the Royal Canadian Mounted Police in Haiti. He is currently President of the Ottawa branch of the Canadian Association of Veterans of UN Peacekeeping (CAVUNP) and a former member of the Royal Canadian Legion. A federal public servant, Mr. Law also operates an Ottawa publishing firm. This company has published over 100 reference books on the Canadian Army related to the 19th and 20th centuries. These books have been distributed worldwide and can be found in numerous museums and at the Juno Beach Centre in France. Mr. Law has participated in Remembrance Day activities throughout Ottawa and read the Act of Remembrance at the 2012 Candlelight Ceremony during Veterans' Week. Since 2012, he has assisted in planning the annual Peacekeeper's Day parade. Mr. Law received an Award of Excellence from the Minister of Veterans Affairs in 2014.

== Organizations ==
Law was active in many Canadian Military Research groups and organizations. Among them he was a member of the following:

- President, Bytown Militaria Collectors Association (BMCA),
- Governor and Fellow, Company of Military Historians (CMH), http://www.military-historians.org/,
- Director, Swords & Ploughshares Museum. https://web.archive.org/web/20180202154829/http://www.calnan.com/swords/,
- Organisation of Military Museums of Canada (OMMC),
- National Automatic Pistol Collector's Association (NAPCA), http://www.napca.net/,
- Lower Canada Arms Collectors Association (LCACA), http://pages.infinit.net/csg/SC/sponsors/Sponsor5-Pub.html,
- Military Collector's Club of Canada (MCCofC),

== Published works ==
The following were personally authored, or edited, by Law:

- Distinguishing Patches: details over 400 formation patches worn in both World Wars and afterwards. (1996, ISBN 0-9699845-2-9)
- Making Tracks: an overview of Canadian tank production in World War Two, including the Valentine, Ram, Sexton and Skink.
- Khaki: the first detailed examination in print of the uniforms worn by the Canadian Expeditionary Force in both Canada and overseas in the First World War. (1997, ISBN 0-9699845-4-5)
- Inglis Diamond: the story of the only military handgun ever produced in Canada.
- Without Warning: an overview of all rifles, optics and other equipment used by Canadian snipers.
- Tools of the Trade: an edited and compiled version of official wartime reports looking at major equipment of the Canadian Army in WWII, including small arms, vehicles and AFVs.
- Canadian Military Handguns, 1855 to 1985: a detailed overview of the sidearms acquired by the Canadian military forces from the inception of the 1855 Militia Act to 1985.
- The Military Motorcycle in Canada: an illustrated history of the acquisition, use and disposal of motorcycles in the Canadian Army and Air Force, from 1908 to 2008.
- Regimental Numbers: a compilation of soldiers' service numbers, starting pre-Second World War to the late 1960s. Includes a history of identity discs, aka 'dog tags'.
- Fuss and Fashion - 200 Years of Canadian Military Headdress: a lavishly illustrated examination of Canadian military headdress from 1812 to 2012
- The Canadian Field Service Cap: co-authored with Dr. James J Boulton, a study of 'wedge caps'
- Scarlet to Khaki: Clive Law's final book, delivered weeks after his death, examining the uniform progression for the Canadian Militia and Permanent Force from the late 1800s to the introduction of Khaki uniforms in the first decade of the twentieth century.

== See also ==
- List of Bishop's College School alumni
