= Richard H. Tomlinson =

Canadian chemist and philanthropist

Richard H. Tomlinson, OC (1924 – 2018) was a Canadian chemist and philanthropist. He was a founding director of Gennum Corp., a Canadian manufacturer of semiconductors and semiconductor-based products, and he made one of the largest single donations to a Canadian university.

He studied at Bishop's College School, Bishop's University, and received a Ph.D. in chemistry in 1948 from McGill University. In 1950, he joined the Department of Chemistry at McMaster University, where he worked until his retirement in 1988. In 2000, he made a donation of Can$64 million to McGill University which was used to create fellowships.

In 2003, he was appointed an Officer of the Order of Canada.

He died on January 28, 2018, at the age of 94.

== See also ==
- List of Bishop's College School alumni
