= Maurice Pollack =

Canadian businessman and philanthropist

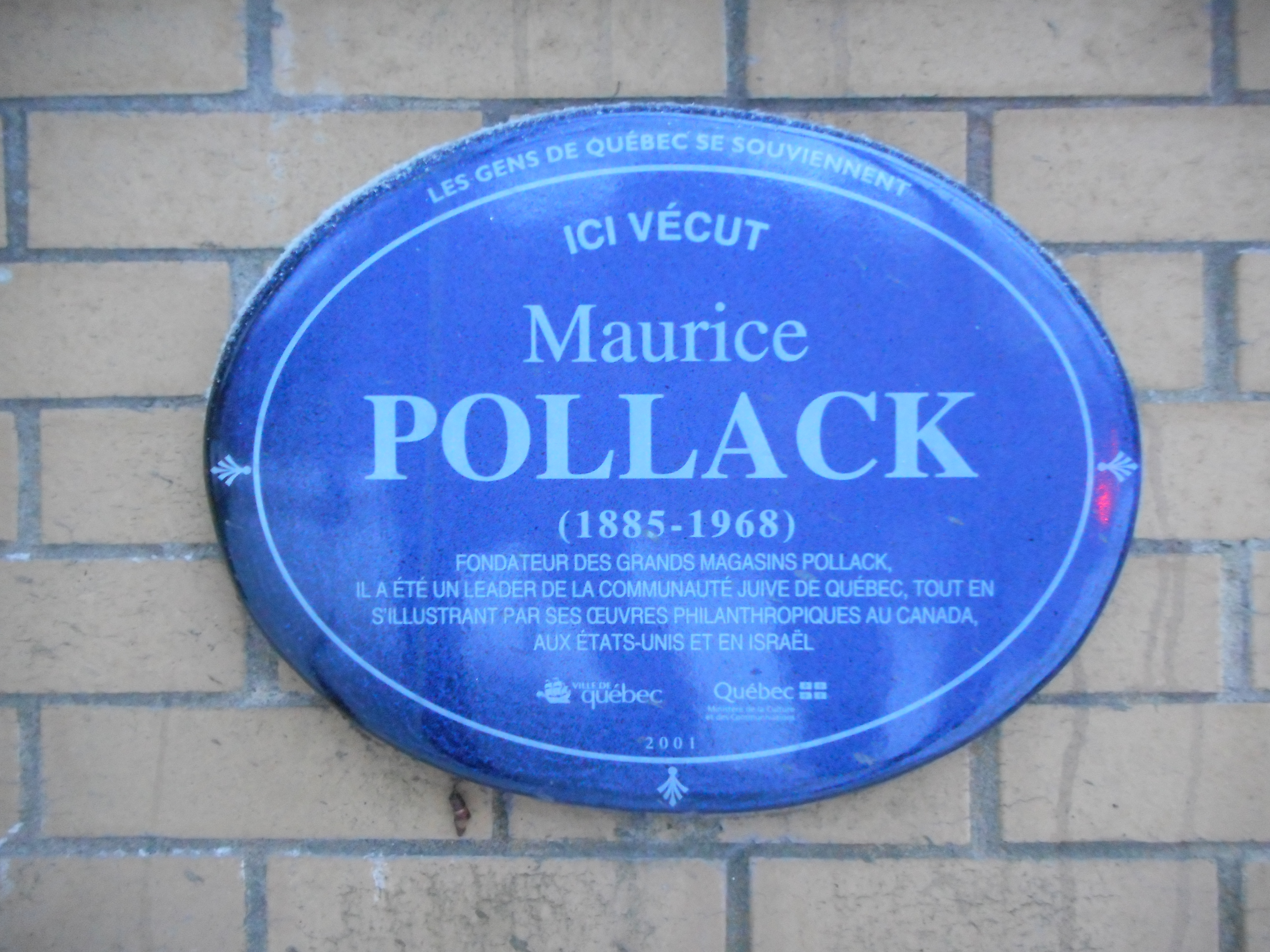

Maurice Pollack (January 28, 1885 – December 16, 1968) was a Canadian businessman and philanthropist.

== Early life ==
Pollack was born in Kanele, Kiev, in Ukraine into a Jewish family. He arrived in Canada in 1902, and settled in Quebec City.

== Career ==
In 1906, at the age of 20, Pollack opened a department store in Saint-Joseph Street in the Saint-Roch district of Quebec City. The business was successful; M. Pollack Ltd. became one of the largest companies in the region, and Pollock moved into a large house on Quebec City's Grand Allée. In 1950 he set up another store on Charest Boulevard. he also had a store in Staint Foy Québec.

== The Maurice Pollack Foundation ==
Having amassed a great deal of money from his commercial enterprises, in 1955 Pollack retired and began to devote his time to philanthropy. He set up a foundation to aid Canadian organizations. Pollack was its president until his death, and was succeeded by his son, Charles C. Pollack.

The Foundation allocated most of its funds to institutions in Quebec, notably to Laval University, McGill University, the Quebec Symphony Orchestra, and the Montreal Symphony Orchestra. In 1966, the Foundation earmarked a fund for the construction of a concert hall at McGill University.

The Foundation has also funded the Jewish Rehabilitation Hospital in Montreal, and the Pollack Cultural Centre at Temple Emanu-El-Beth Sholom (Westmount, Quebec).

== Recognition ==
The Maurice Pollack Award is presented to individuals in recognition of their efforts regarding equal access to employment for Quebecers from cultural communities and visible minorities, as well as accommodation of ethno-cultural diversity and adaptation of services in the workplace. The award honours two laureates, one in the "public and para-public corporations or organizations" categoryand the other, in the "private sector enterprises or organizations" category.

At Laval University, the student services building, which his foundation helped to set up, is named after him: the Pavillon Maurice-Pollack.
