= Roméo LeBlanc =

Governor General of Canada from 1995 to 1999

The Right Honourable Roméo LeBlanc PC CC CMM ONB CD
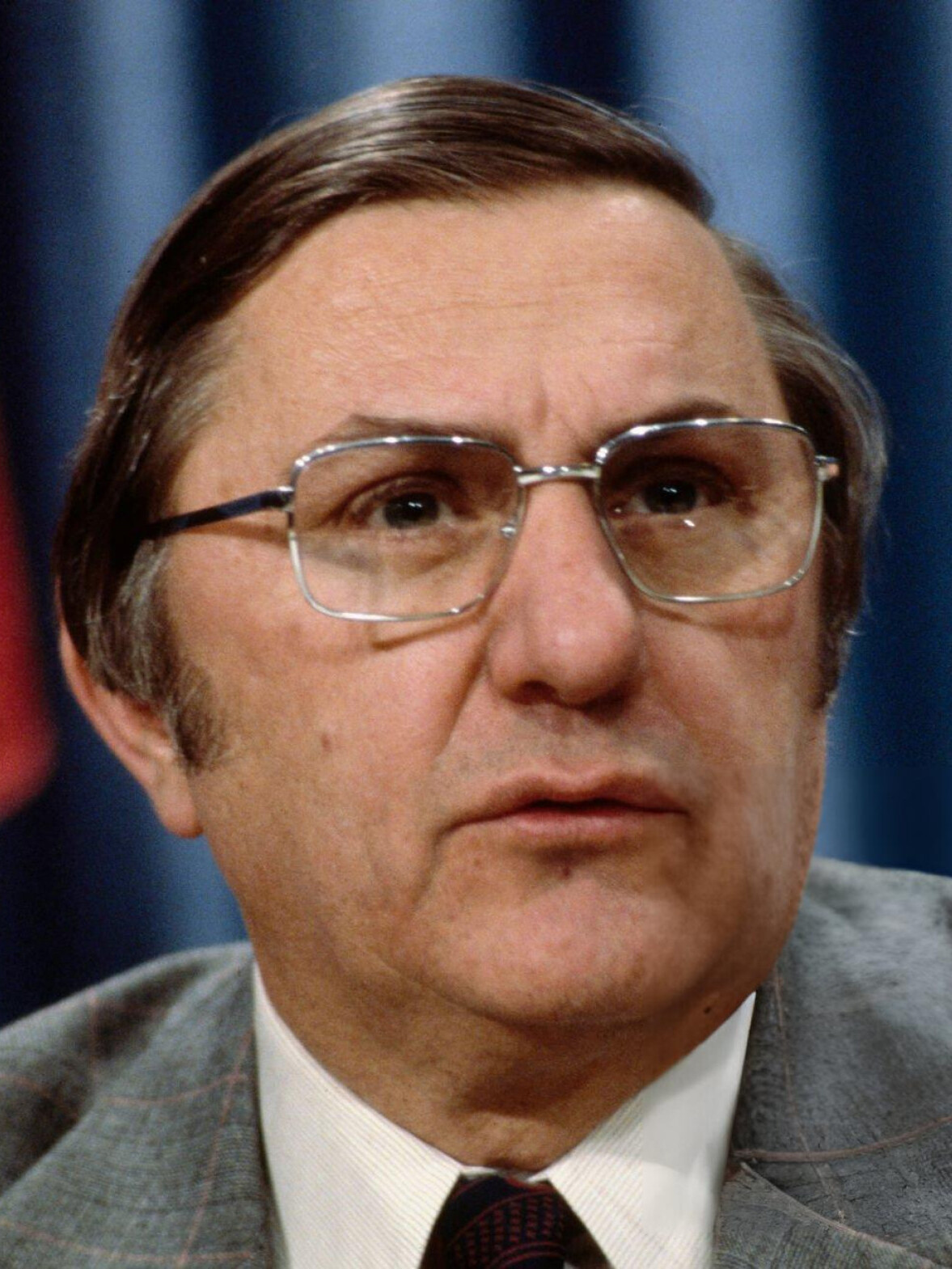
- LeBlanc, c. 1979

25th Governor General of Canada
- In office February 8, 1995 – October 7, 1999
- Monarch: Elizabeth II
- Prime Minister: Jean Chrétien
- Preceded by: Ray Hnatyshyn
- Succeeded by: Adrienne Clarkson

More...

Personal details
- Born: Roméo-Adrien LeBlanc; December 18, 1927 Memramcook, New Brunswick, Canada
- Died: June 24, 2009 (aged 81) Grande-Digue, New Brunswick, Canada
- Party: Liberal
- Spouses: Lyn Carter (1966–1981); Diana Fowler (1994–2009)
- Children: Dominic LeBlanc; Genevieve LeBlanc
- Education: University of St. Joseph's College (BA); Université de Paris
- Profession: Politician, Journalist, Teacher

Roméo-Adrien LeBlanc (December 18, 1927 – June 24, 2009) was a Canadian journalist and politician who served as the 25th governor general of Canada from 1995 to 1999.

LeBlanc was born and educated in New Brunswick, and also studied in France prior to becoming a teacher and then a reporter for Radio-Canada. He was elected to the House of Commons in 1972, whereafter he served as a minister of the Crown until 1984, when he was moved to the Senate and became that chamber's Speaker.

In 1995, he was appointed as governor general by Queen Elizabeth II, on the recommendation of Prime Minister of Canada Jean Chrétien, to replace Ramon John Hnatyshyn as viceroy, and he occupied the post until succeeded by Adrienne Clarkson in 1999, citing his health as the reason for his stepping down. His appointment as the Queen's representative caused some controversy, due to perceptions of political favouritism, though he was praised for raising the stature of Acadians and francophones, and for returning Rideau Hall to the centre of life in Ottawa.

On August 8, 1974, LeBlanc was sworn into the Queen's Privy Council for Canada. He died of Alzheimer's disease on June 24, 2009, aged 81.

== Early life ==
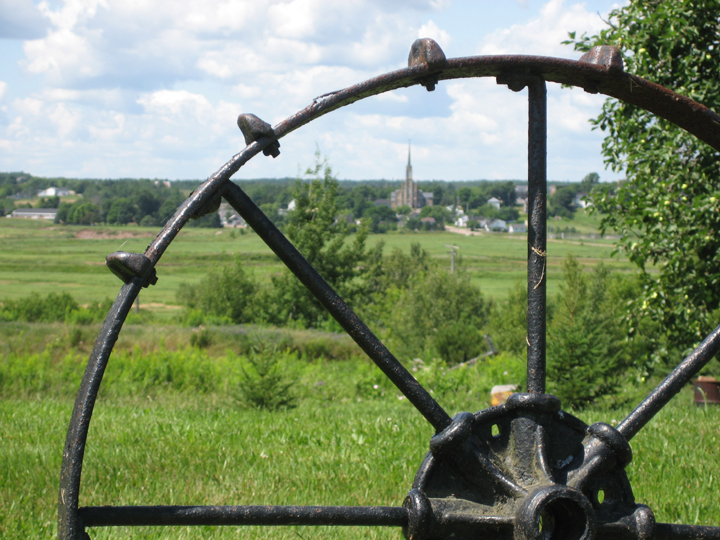
The rural community of Memramcook, New Brunswick, where LeBlanc was born and raised

LeBlanc was born on December 18, 1927, in Memramcook, New Brunswick, where he was raised, the youngest of seven children of Marie Lucie Claire LeBlanc and Philias LeBlanc. LeBlanc obtained bachelor degrees in arts and education from the Collège St-Joseph before studying French civilization at the Université de Paris. He then moved on to teaching for nine years— at Drummond's high school from 1951 to 1953 and the New Brunswick Teachers' College in Fredericton from 1955 to 1959— after which he obtained work between 1960 and 1967 as a journalist with the Canadian Broadcasting Corporation's French language broadcaster, Radio-Canada, serving in the bureaus in Ottawa, the United Kingdom, and the United States.

His first marriage, to Joslyn "Lyn" Carter, with whom LeBlanc had two children (Genevieve and Dominic), lasted from 1966 to 1981; in 1994, he married Diana Fowler, who also had two children from a previous marriage.

== Early political career ==
LeBlanc stepped into the realm of politics when he became the press secretary for successive prime ministers Lester B. Pearson and Pierre Trudeau. He then went further, winning in the 1972 federal election a seat in the House of Commons as the Liberal Party representative for Westmorland-Kent, paving the way for his appointment as the Minister of Fisheries and Oceans in the Cabinet chaired by Trudeau.

LeBlanc was a key figure in Canada's imposition of a 200-mile fishing zone; the establishment of a new fisheries licensing system; the widespread use of quotas and zones that protected Canadian fishermen from overexpansion and competition from trawlers owned by large companies; the owner-operator rule, requiring licence holders to operate vessels themselves; the separate-fleet rule, preventing corporations from obtaining licences for an under-65-foot fleet; and for creating an additional system of advisory committees that permitted fishermen a larger voice in fisheries management.

On one occasion, LeBlanc also persuaded Trudeau to advise the Governor General to close Canadian ports to Soviet fishing vessels, a headline-grabbing diplomatic thrust that resulted in better co-operation, and forbade all foreign corporations from holding commercial fishing licences in Canada.

On the Pacific coast, LeBlanc oversaw the creation of the Salmonid Enhancement Program, which aimed at doubling salmon production, and quelled plans by Alcan that were deemed to threaten salmon rivers at the time.

Late in 1982, LeBlanc became Minister of Public Works for two years before being nominated by Trudeau to then Governor General Jeanne Sauvé for appointment to the Senate on June 29, 1984. He was then selected in 1993 by Prime Minister Jean Chrétien as Governor General Ray Hnatyshyn's appointee as that chamber's speaker.

== Governor General of Canada ==
LeBlanc's time as the Queen's viceregal representative was considered to have been low key and largely uneventful, especially in comparison to that of his successor, Adrienne Clarkson. He was, however, the first governor general of Acadian heritage, which earned praise from the Acadian community, and he was also the first from the Canadian Maritimes to be appointed as viceroy.

=== As governor general-designate ===
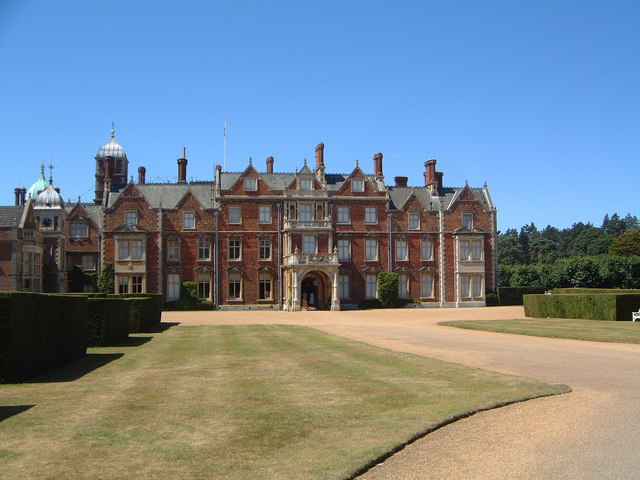
Sandringham House, where LeBlanc met with Queen Elizabeth II after his appointment as Governor General-Designate

It was announced from the Office of the Prime Minister of Canada on November 22, 1994, that Queen Elizabeth II had approved Prime Minister Jean Chrétien's choice of LeBlanc to succeed Ray Hnatyshyn as the Queen's representative.

Thereafter, LeBlanc was invited to an audience with the Queen at Sandringham House, and he was said to have been impressed and inspired by the devotion to duty on the part of both Elizabeth and her mother.

The commission appointing LeBlanc under the royal sign-manual and Great Seal of Canada was issued on January 16, 1995.

The greatest publicity LeBlanc attracted in his career came immediately after the announcement of his appointment as Governor General: although previous honorees had worked as politicians prior to and after serving as viceroy, the recommendation of a prominent Liberal Party politician and organiser was criticised as being little more than a patronage gift from the Prime Minister to a loyal party member.

In the 1993 federal election, LeBlanc had been one of the chief architects of the Liberal Party's election strategy, and was a strong party loyalist. In protest, both Reform Party of Canada leader Preston Manning and Bloc Québécois leader Lucien Bouchard refused to attend LeBlanc's installation ceremony.

=== In office ===
As with each governor general, LeBlanc took on unofficial and personal mandates, choosing for himself: voluntarism, the teaching of Canadian history, Canada's Aboriginal peoples, and the military. He spoke often about the generosity, tolerance, and compassion of Canadians, and admired the dignity and abilities of the common citizen.

To recognize the "unsung heroes" who volunteer their time and effort to help others, LeBlanc initiated in 1996 the Governor General's Caring Canadian Award, and, on June 21, of the same year, was proud to issue a royal proclamation inaugurating National Aboriginal Day as an annual observance.

As well, in 1996 LeBlanc formed the Governor General's Award for Excellence in Teaching Canadian History, in 1999 partnered with the Canada Council for the Arts to create the Governor General's Awards in Visual and Media Arts, oversaw the issuance of the Governor General's Canadian History Medal for the Millennium, and established the Governor General's Millennium Edition of the Map of Canada, which was taken into space in 1999 by Julie Payette.

LeBlanc travelled to all parts of Canada and had a special affinity for small towns and cities, making himself particularly visible in those parts of Quebec after the province's referendum on secession in 1995. He participated in more than 2,000 events, including the annual New Year's Levée, which he moved to various locations around the country, seeing the party organised at Ottawa, Ontario, in 1996; Quebec City, Quebec, in 1997; Winnipeg, Manitoba, in 1998; and St. John's, Newfoundland and Labrador, in 1999.

Over the same years, LeBlanc also had public access to Rideau Hall and its grounds expanded and improved— including opening a dedicated visitors' centre in 1997— so that the number of visitors increased threefold to approximately 125,000 people per year. In keeping with his respect for the First Peoples of Canada, LeBlanc placed a totem pole and inukshuk prominently on the royal property.

Amongst numerous other official and ceremonial duties, the Governor General proclaimed in force three amendments to the constitution, on April 21, 1997, December 19, 1997, and January 8, 1998. He issued the statutory proclamation announcing the creation of the territory of Nunavut on April 1, 1999. LeBlanc welcomed to Rideau Hall the Queen, Prince Philip, Duke of Edinburgh, and Prince Charles, Prince of Wales, along with a host of foreign dignitaries such as United States president Bill Clinton and his wife, Hillary; King Hussein and Queen Noor of Jordan, and later Hussein's son, King Abdullah II, and his wife Queen Rania; as well as President of South Africa Nelson Mandela; and President of China Jiang Zemin. Further, he undertook eight state visits, becoming the first governor general of Canada to make such trips to the Czech Republic, India, Pakistan, the Ivory Coast, Tanzania, Mali, and Morocco.

=== Legacy ===
As governor general, LeBlanc was viewed as having been a role model for Acadians, and was complimented for having drawn the attention of the country to Acadian history and culture. As such, he was seen as a symbol for reconciliation, given the past relations between the Acadians and the Canadian Crown's predecessor. At the same time, LeBlanc was also credited for returning Rideau Hall to a status closer to that which it held a century previous, when it was the centre of life in the national capital.

The Governor General's standard as redesigned at LeBlanc's direction, declawed and delangued

Although LeBlanc enjoyed all the provinces and territories, his visits touching small towns as well as big cities, he travelled to events in his home province to a degree that some saw as disproportionate. Moreover, LeBlanc never sought media coverage, with the result that many Canadians were unaware of who he was, and his down-to-earth demeanour was thought by some to have been too "folksy" for the post. The accusations of political patronage also failed to evaporate during LeBlanc's governorship; while LeBlanc was viceroy, his son, Dominic, continued to work for the prime minister's office until 1997, when he ran for election to the House of Commons in LeBlanc's old riding, where the Governor General had a series of events planned the very week he dropped the election writs. Further, LeBlanc's daughter maintained employment as a political assistant to Liberal Cabinet ministers, and some of the Governor General's staff had close Liberal Party connections.

Personal touches were also left on the symbol of the Canadian viceregal office, from which LeBlanc removed the claws and tongue of the crowned lion, saying that they were impolite and un-Canadian. Though the change did not gather much attention until near the end of LeBlanc's tenure, the reaction, when it came, was generally unfavourable, and the modifications were undone by his successor.

== Post-viceregal life and death ==
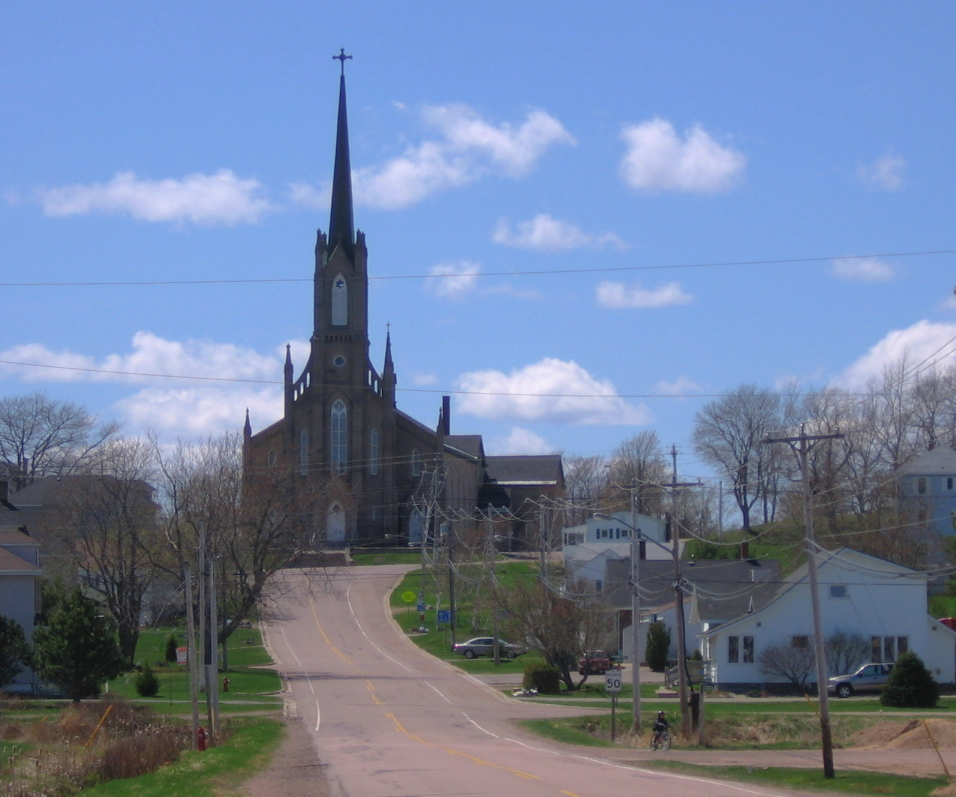
St. Thomas Church in Memramcook was the location of his state funeral.

After being released from the Queen's service, LeBlanc returned to New Brunswick. There, after a lengthy battle with Alzheimer's disease, he died on June 24, 2009, in Grande-Digue.

He was, as is protocol for all incumbent and former governors general, accorded a state funeral, which took place on July 3 of the same year, in Memramcook. The casket's path through the community was lined with officers from the Department of Fisheries and Oceans, paying homage to LeBlanc's time as minister of the Crown with that portfolio, and the sitting governor general, Michaëlle Jean, her prime minister, Stephen Harper, and LeBlanc's former prime minister, Jean Chrétien, all attended.

Canada Post featured LeBlanc on a postage stamp released on February 8, 2010.

== Honours and arms ==
=== Honours ===
Ribbon bars of Roméo LeBlanc

Appointments

- (Canada) January 4, 1973 – July 9, 1984: Member of Parliament (MP)
- August 8, 1974 – June 24, 2009: Member of the Queen's Privy Council for Canada (PC)
- February 8, 1995 – October 8, 2000: Chancellor and Principal Companion of the Order of Canada (CC)
  - October 8, 1999 – June 24, 2009: Companion of the Order of Canada (CC)
- (Canada) February 8, 1995 – October 8, 2000: Chancellor and Commander of the Order of Military Merit (CMM)
  - October 8, 1999 – June 24, 2009: Commander of the Order of Military Merit (CMM)
- February 8, 1995 – October 8, 2000: Knight of Justice, Prior, and Chief Officer in Canada of the Most Venerable Order of the Hospital of Saint John of Jerusalem
  - October 8, 1999 – June 24, 2009: Knight of Justice of the Most Venerable Order of the Hospital of Saint John of Jerusalem

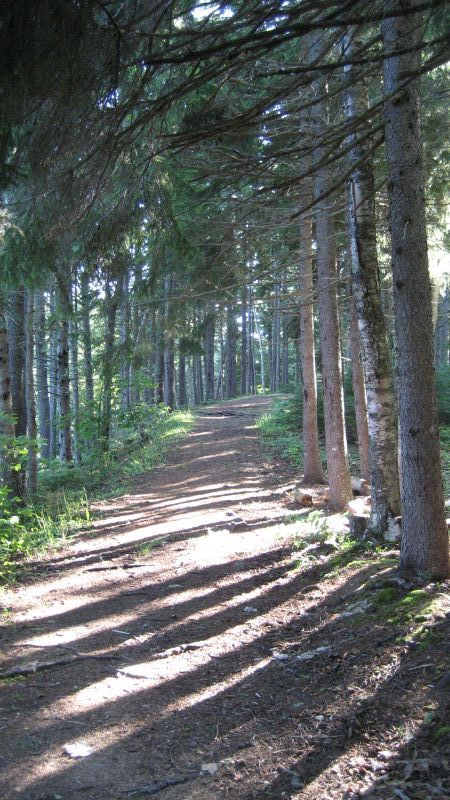
LeBlanc Park in LeBlanc's hometown of Memramcook, New Brunswick

- February 8, 1995 – October 8, 2000: Chief Scout of Canada
- 1995 – June 24, 2009: Honorary Member of the Royal Military College of Canada Club
- August 1, 2005 – June 24, 2009: Member of the Order of New Brunswick (ONB)

Medals

- 1992: Commemorative Medal for the 125th Anniversary of the Confederation of Canada
- (Canada) February 8, 1995: Canadian Forces' Decoration (CD)
- (Canada) 2002: Queen Elizabeth II Golden Jubilee Medal

Foreign honours

- (France) 2002 – June 24, 2009: Grand officier de l'Ordre national du Mérite

==== Honorary military appointments ====
- (Canada) February 8, 1990 – October 8, 2000: Colonel of the Governor General's Horse Guards
- (Canada) February 8, 1990 – October 8, 2000: Colonel of the Governor General's Foot Guards
- (Canada) February 8, 1990 – October 8, 2000: Colonel of the Canadian Grenadier Guards

==== Honorary degrees ====
- (New Brunswick) 1977: Mount Allison University, Doctor of Civil Law (DCL)
- (New Brunswick) 1979: University of Moncton, Doctor of Public Administration (DPA)
- (Nova Scotia) 1995: Université Sainte-Anne, Doctor of Laws (LLD)
- (Ontario) 1996: Ryerson University, Doctor of Letters (DLitt)
- (Ontario) 1996: University of Ottawa, Doctor of the university (DUniv)
- (New Brunswick) 1997: St. Thomas University, Doctor of Laws (LLD)
- (Newfoundland and Labrador) 1997: Memorial University of Newfoundland, Doctor of Laws (LLD)
- (Quebec) 1997: McGill University, Doctor of Laws (LLD)
- 1999: University of New Brunswick, Doctor of Laws (LLD)

==== Honorific eponyms ====
Geographic locations

- New Brunswick: LeBlanc Park, Memramcook
- New Brunswick: Greater Moncton Roméo LeBlanc International Airport, Dieppe

=== Arms ===
Coat of arms of Roméo LeBlanc
Notes Just prior to his installation as Governor General, LeBlanc was granted a personal coat of arms that depicted his Acadian and Canadian roots. Adopted January 1, 1995 Crest Four eagle feathers within a circlet of Micmac quill decoration Gules Escutcheon Argent on a pile Gules the Star of Acadia ensigned by a representation of the Royal Crown Or. Supporters Two dolphins Argent each gorged with a collar of maple leaves Gules and fleurs de lys Or, pendant there from a plate Azure, dexter surmounted by a steam locomotive wheel Or, sinister surmounted by a book Or Compartment Issuant from a mound set with maple leaves all Gules flanked by waves proper Motto SEMPER AMISSOS MEMINISSE DECET (It is right to remember the forgotten) Orders The ribbon and insignia of a Companion of the Order of Canada. DESIDERANTES MELIOREM PATRIAM (They desire a better country) Symbolism The use of white recalls the LeBlanc family name, while the pile refers to the Memramcook Valley, where LeBlanc was born, and the dolphins evoke the Rivière Dauphin (now Annapolis River), where LeBlanc's ancestors settled in the mid 17th century, as well as LeBlanc's maritime heritage and his service as the minister of fisheries. The star is a symbol long used by the Acadians, as are the fleurs de lys representative of LeBlanc's roots in that community, and the royal crown represents LeBlanc's appointment as the representative of the Canadian sovereign. The eagle feathers, symbols of peace, honour the Canadian First Nations, and the number represents LeBlanc's four children. More family links are depicted in the steam locomotive wheel – representing LeBlanc's father's service on the Canadian railways – and the book evoking LeBlanc's training and work as a teacher. The compartment symbolises a multi-ethnic Canada between two seas, and recalls the Micmac origin of the word Memramcook, meaning multi-coloured landscape.

== See also ==
- List of people from Westmorland County, New Brunswick
- Journalism

Government offices
Preceded by Ray Hnatyshyn	Governor General of Canada; February 8, 1995 – October 6, 2000	Succeeded by Adrienne Clarkson
Political offices
20th Canadian Ministry (1968–1979) – First cabinet of Pierre Trudeau
Cabinet posts (5)
Predecessor	Office	Successor
New title	Minister of Fisheries and Oceans; April 2, 1979 – June 3, 1979	James McGrath
Himself as acting minister	Minister of the Environment; September 14, 1976 – April 1, 1979 styled as Minister of Fisheries and the Environment	Leonard Stephen Marchand
Jean Marchand	Minister of the Environment (acting); July 1, 1976 – September 13, 1976	Himself as minister
Jeanne Sauvé	Minister of the Environment (acting); December 5, 1975 – January 21, 1976	Jean Marchand
n/a	Minister of State (Fisheries); August 8, 1974 – September 13, 1976	n/a
22nd Canadian Ministry (1980–1984) – Second cabinet of Pierre Trudeau
Cabinet posts (2)
Predecessor	Office	Successor
Paul James Cosgrove	Minister of Public Works; September 30, 1982 – June 29, 1984	Charles Lapointe
James McGrath	Minister of Fisheries and Oceans; March 3, 1980 – September 29, 1982	Pierre de Bané
Special Cabinet Responsibilities
Predecessor	Title	Successor
n/a	Minister responsible for the Canada Mortgage and Housing Corporation; September 30, 1982 – June 29, 1984	n/a
Parliament of Canada
Preceded by Guy Charbonneau	Speaker of the Senate of Canada; December 7, 1993 – November 21, 1994	Succeeded by Gildas Molgat
Preceded by Guy F. Crossman	Member of Parliament for Westmorland—Kent; October 30, 1972 – June 29, 1984	Succeeded by Fernand Robichaud
