= Service Publications =

Service Publications is a Canadian publishing company specializing in the study and documentation of Canadian military history. Founded in 1995 by author, historian, and military officer Clive M. Law (1954–2017), the company has developed a distinct niche in producing and distributing reference works related to the uniforms, weapons, vehicles, insignia, and equipment of the Canadian armed forces.

Operating from Ontario, Service Publications publishes both its own original titles and selected works from other military publishers, serving historians, collectors, researchers, and museums with highly detailed articles.

== Weapons of War ==
The Weapons of War series consists of inexpensive pamphlet-style booklets highlighting military vehicles, weapons, and artillery used by Canadian forces throughout the 20th century. Each volume typically examines one weapon system or vehicle type, such as the Bren Gun Carrier, Canadian Sherman Tank, or PIAT Anti-Tank Projector and provides a concise overview of its design, service history, and Canadian modifications. The series serves as an introductory guide for enthusiasts while maintaining technical accuracy.

== UpClose ==
The UpClose series presents more comprehensive, in-depth studies of Canadian uniforms, insignia, and equipment employed by the Canadian Army through history. These titles are designed to give collectors, researchers and museum curators in-depth information on a single topic. The books are written largely form primary, archival sources with extensive use of contemporary photographs. Modern studio photographs also augments the text.

There are eight titles in the UpClose series:

Distinguishing Patches: Formation Patches of the Canadian Army, 1916-1996 by Clive M. Law. Documents the history of the design, approval and use of sleeve-worn formation patches of the Canadian Army. 1996, ISBN 0-9699845-2-9

Tin Lids: Canadian Combat Helmets by Roger V. Lucy. A detailed history of the acquisition and use of steel (and later, kevlar) helmets in the Canadian Army. ISBN 0-9699845-3-7

Khaki - Uniforms of the CEF, by Clive M. Law, Examines both the uniquely Canadian uniforms as well as the standard British issues of the Great War. 1997, ISBN 0-9699845-4-5

A Question of Confidence - The Ross Rifle in the Trenches by Col. A.F. Duguid, (Edited by Clive M. Law) This is an edited version of the Ross history written between the wars by the Canadian Army's Official Historian.

Dressed to Kill by Michael A. Dorosh. Is an in-depth examination of the Battle Dress, Service Dress and Khaki Drill uniforms issued to Canadian Other Ranks in World War II. 2001, ISBN 1-894581-07-5

Making Tracks - Tank Production in Canada by Clive M. Law. An examination of Canadian tank production in the Second World War.

'37 Web - Equipping the Canadian Soldierby Ed Storey. A look at 1937 Web Equipment, the infantry gear worn by Canadians in World War II and Korea. 2003, ISBN 1-894581-09-1

Without Warning: Canadian Sniper Equipment of the 20th Century by Clive M. Law. A serious study of Canadian-made and Canadian-issued sniper equipment from World War I to the war in Afghanistan.

== Periodical ==
A semi-regular periodical called Military Artifact featured articles on obscure Canadian militaria, usually using primary sources and previously unpublished contemporary photographs. ISSN 1205-7096
