= Patricia Chuey =

Canadian dietician)

Patricia Chuey, MSc., RD, FDC, is a Canadian Registered Dietitian (Note: Note: Dietitians are currently the only regulated nutrition professionals in Canada.) and award winner for excellence in nutrition communications. In 2018, she was inducted into the inaugural Alumni Hall of Fame in the College of Pharmacy and Nutrition at the University of Saskatchewan. In 2017, she received the Ryley-Jeffs Memorial Award, the highest honour given to a Canadian dietitian. In 2014 she was granted Fellowship in Dietitians of Canada; and was named as one of the "Alumni of Influence" of the University of Saskatchewan, for work in promoting healthy eating and well-being in Canada. Her food and nutrition commentary appears in the Canadian media including publications such as Canadian Living magazine, The Province newspaper (Vancouver) and Wellness Matters Magazine.

== Writer and author ==
She has authored six books and contributed content to other books. Examples include:

- Simply Great Food (2007), Dietitians of Canada, Robert Rose Publishing, Co-authors: Patricia Chuey, Mary Sue Waisman and Eileen Campbell.
- The 80-20 Cookbook: Eating for Energy Without Deprivation (2004), Eating for Energy, Co-authors: Patricia Chuey and Diana Steele
- The 80-20 Cookbook: Eating for Energy Without Deprivation, Gluten-Free Version (2014), Eating for Energy, Author: Patricia Chuey
- The 101 Most Asked Nutrition Questions (1999), Eating for Energy, Author: Patricia Chuey

She has provided content to books including:

- Fit to Deliver: An Innovative Prenatal and Postpartum Fitness Program (2005), Hartley+Marks Publishers, Authors: K Nordahl, C Petersen and R Jeffreys
- The Beginning Runner's Handbook: The Proven 13-Week Walk/Run Program (2005), Greystone Books, Authors: SportMedBC

== Recipe and food product development ==
She is considered one of Canada's top culinary dietitians. Her recipes appear in Canadian newspapers and follow an 80-20 approach to healthy eating which promotes eating well at least 80% of the time while allowing some room to be flexible and occasionally indulge. She was the dietitian on the television program What's Cooking (City TV), 2010–2012. She invented a gluten-free all-purpose flour and consults to the food industry regarding product development and consumer eating habits.
