= Université Laval =

Public research university in Quebec City, Canada

- Laval University (English)
- Latin: Universitas Laval
- Former name: Séminaire de Québec (1663-1852)
- Motto: Deo favente haud pluribus impar (Latin)
- Motto in English: By the grace of God, to no one equal
- Type: Public
- Established: 1852; 174 years ago
- Academic affiliations: ACU, CARL, UArctic, Universities Canada, U15
- Endowment: CAD$377 million
- Rector: Sophie D'Amours
- Students: 47,690
- Undergraduates: 33,430
- Postgraduates: 14,260
- Location: Quebec City, Quebec, Canada; 46°46′48″N 71°16′29″W
- Campus: Urban/Suburban
- Language: French
- Colours: Red & gold
- Nickname: Rouge-et-Or
- Sporting affiliations: CIS, QSSF
- Website: www.ulaval.ca

Université Laval (Note: French pronunciation: [ynivɛʁsite laval], locally [ʏnivaɛ̯ʁ̥sɪ̥te laval]; English: Laval University (Note: As with most Francophone post-secondary institutions in Quebec, the university does not have an official name in English, with the institution using the name Université Laval.)) is a public research university in Quebec City, Quebec, Canada. Université Laval traces its roots to the Séminaire de Québec, which was founded by François de Montmorency-Laval in 1663. Université Laval is the oldest institution of higher education in Canada, as well as the first North American institution to offer higher education in French. It is ranked among the top 10 Canadian universities in research funding and holds four Canada Excellence Research Chairs.

Université Laval was originally founded in Old Québec, although it moved to a new campus in the 1950s, located in the suburb of Sainte-Foy. Since Quebec City was amalgamated with many of its suburbs in 2001, the University has been located in Quebec City. At present, Université Laval is located in the suburban borough of Sainte-Foy–Sillery–Cap-Rouge in Quebec.

== History ==
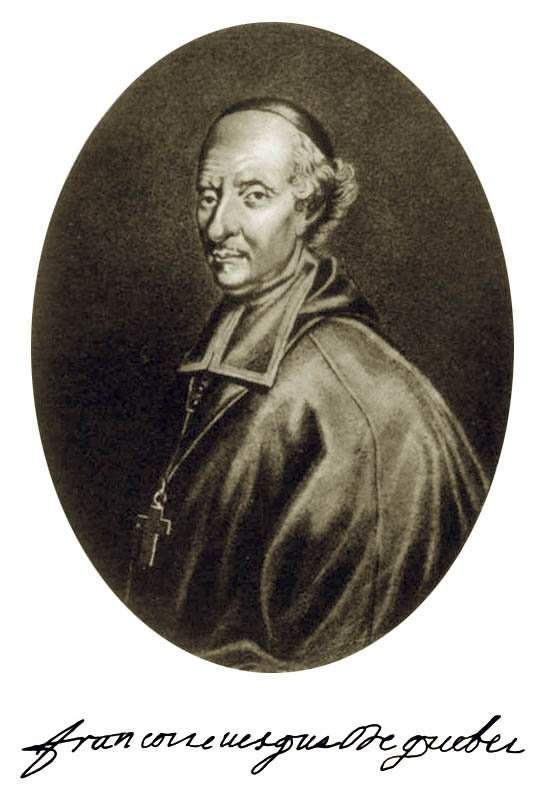
François de Laval

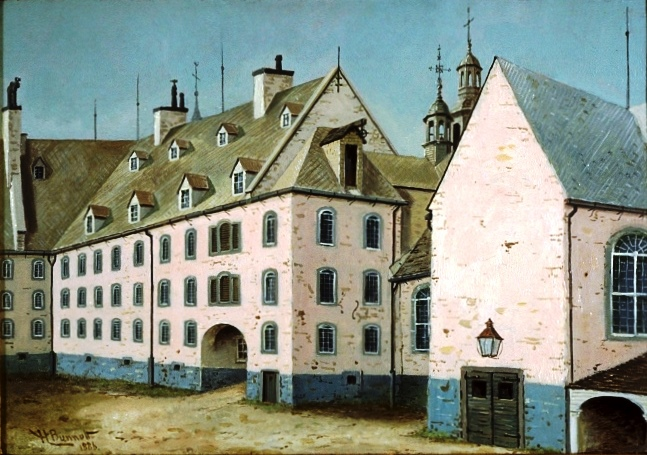
The Seminary, painting, 1886

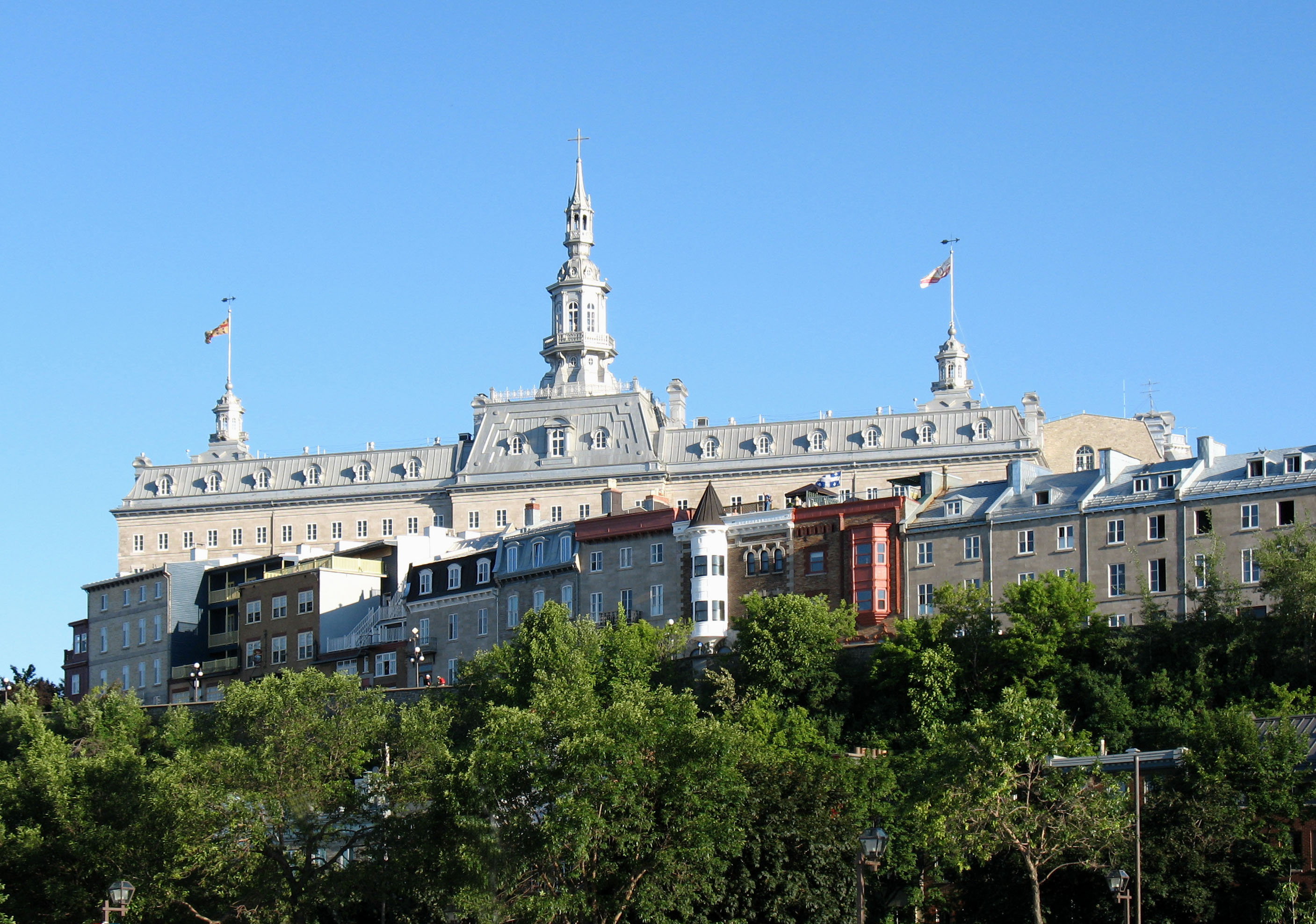
The Old Séminaire de Québec in 2008

The university's beginnings go back to 1663 with the founding of the Grand Séminaire de Québec and 1668 with the founding of the Petit Séminaire by François de Montmorency-Laval, a member of the House of Laval and the first Bishop of New France.

During the French regime, the institution mainly trained priests to serve in New France. After the Conquest of 1760, the British expanded education in Canada to include the liberal arts. French Canadians had at the time no opportunity to pursue higher education, and Bishop Bourget of Montreal suggested expanding the Séminaire de Québec into Université Laval. Louis Casault, a priest who taught physics at the Séminaire de Québec, went to Europe to seek a royal charter and study the best university systems there.

The Séminaire de Québec was granted a royal charter on December 8, 1852, by Queen Victoria, at the request of Lord Elgin, then Governor-General of the Province of Canada. Through the charter, Université Laval was created with "the rights and privileges of a university". Pope Benedict XV approved the plan and authorized the institution to establish chairs of theology and confer degrees.

In 1878, the university opened a second campus in Montreal, which became the Université de Montréal on May 8, 1919, by a writ of Pope Benedict XV. In 1971, a second charter transferred all authority to the Université Laval council.

By 1925, the university had outgrown its location. The Old City was very crowded, making it difficult to add new buildings to the campus. The university moved to Sainte-Foy in the 1950s, which at the time was a semi-rural community west of the Quebec city centre. The School of Architecture returned to the old building (now affectionately referred to as Le Vieux Séminaire) in 1989.

Université Laval is governed by a board of governors and a faculty senate. This structure was modelled on the provincial University of Toronto Act of 1906, which established a bicameral system of university government consisting of a senate (faculty), responsible for academic policy, and a board of governors (citizens) exercising exclusive control over financial policy and having formal authority in all other matters. The president, appointed by the board, was to serve as a link between the two bodies and lead the institution.

In the early part of the 20th century, the need for higher education expanded beyond the classical fields of theology, law and medicine, and the university introduced science and social-science departments such as forestry and household science. In addition, graduate training based on the German-inspired American model of specialized course work and the completion of a research thesis was introduced.

"Laval", a waltz by French-Canadian ragtime composer Wilfrid Beaudry, was dedicated to the students at Laval University and the University of Montreal. The music for piano was published in Quebec by J. Beaudry, circa 1906.

In 1929, the Quebec Seminary was designated as a national historic site of Canada.

The university opened its department of social, political, and economic sciences in 1938, signalling a change of approach that continued into the 1960s, based on an idea of higher education as the key to social justice and economic productivity for individuals and society.

The royal charter that founded Université Laval in 1852 was designated a National Historic Event in 1972. This location, at 1 rue des Remparts, Quebec, still continues operation as a centre for educating Roman Catholic priests. A section of the Vieux Séminaire has been the location for the Université's school of architecture since 1987. The Camille-Roy pavilion houses the restored Promotions Room, which can be rented as a venue for various types of events.

In 2017, the university became the first in Canada to divest its endowment from fossil fuel companies.

== Buildings and features ==
After it was granted a university charter, several buildings were built in Old Quebec, including the School of Chemistry (1923), the addition on Ste. Famille Street (1931), the Mining School (1938), and the cafeteria building (1945), all by architect Joseph Simeon Bergeron. However, the neighbourhood was already crowded and activities later moved in nearby Sainte-Foy, which was more spacious.

=== Campus building ===
Today's campus covers 1.2 km^{2} (0.46 mi^{2}; 120 ha; 300 acres) and has over 30 buildings (also called pavillons), including many iconic exemplars of modern architecture. Its earliest buildings and landscapes were designed by Edouard Fiset (fr) from the 1950s, and of its lands, 56 per cent are wooded areas, grasslands, and sports fields.

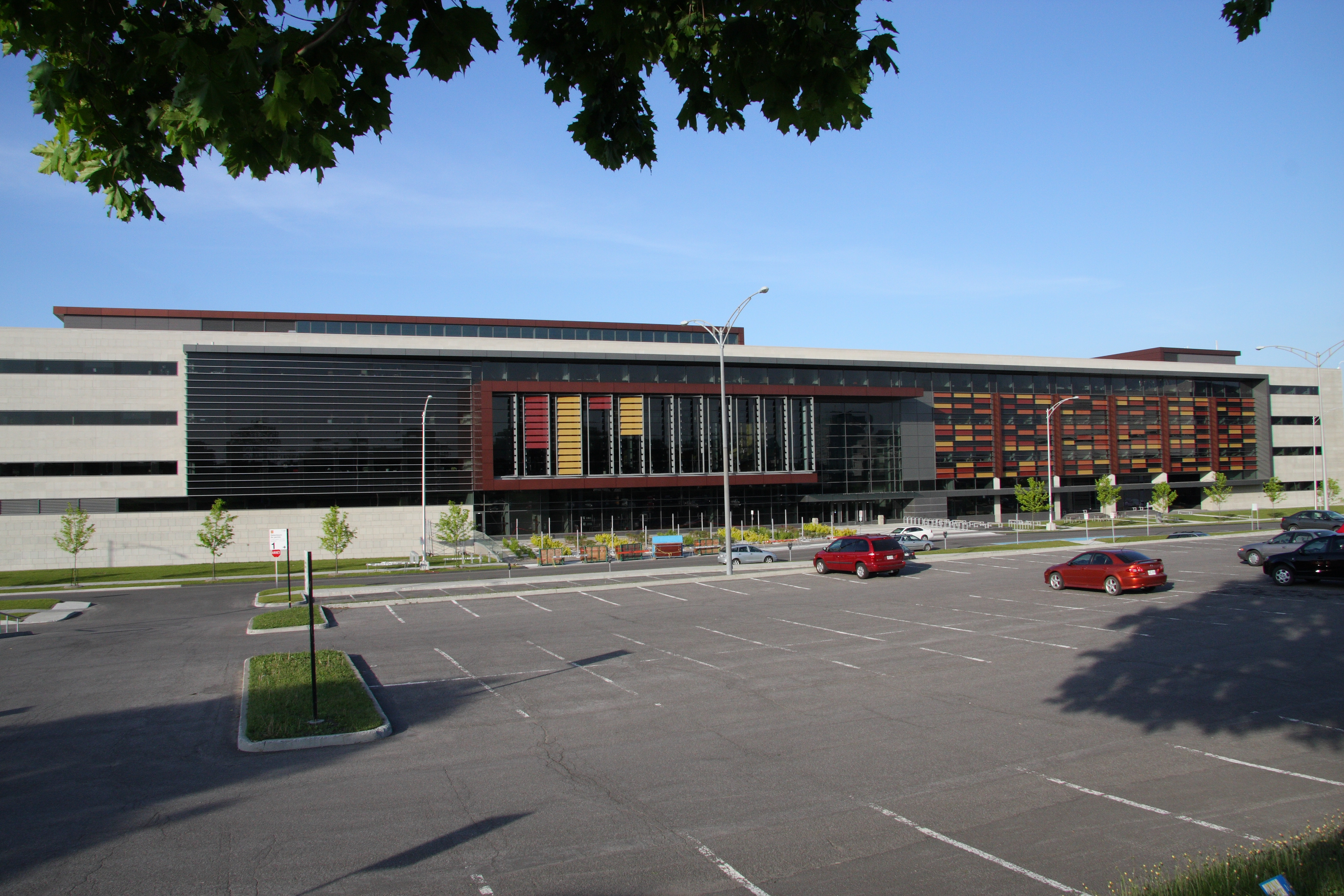
Ferdinand Vandry building, (health sciences)

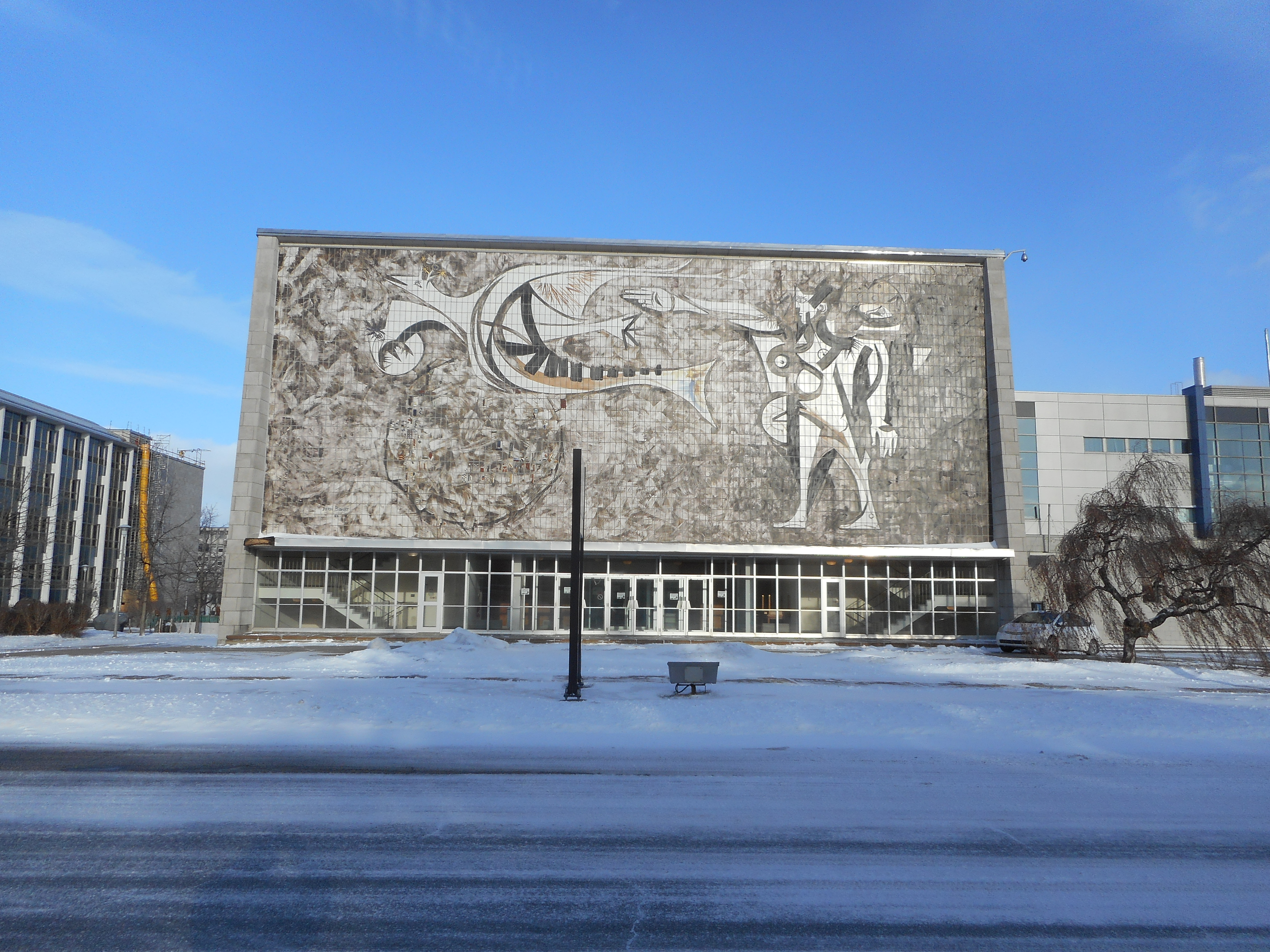
L'Homme devant la Science (1963), mural by Jordi Bonet on the Adrien-Pouliot building

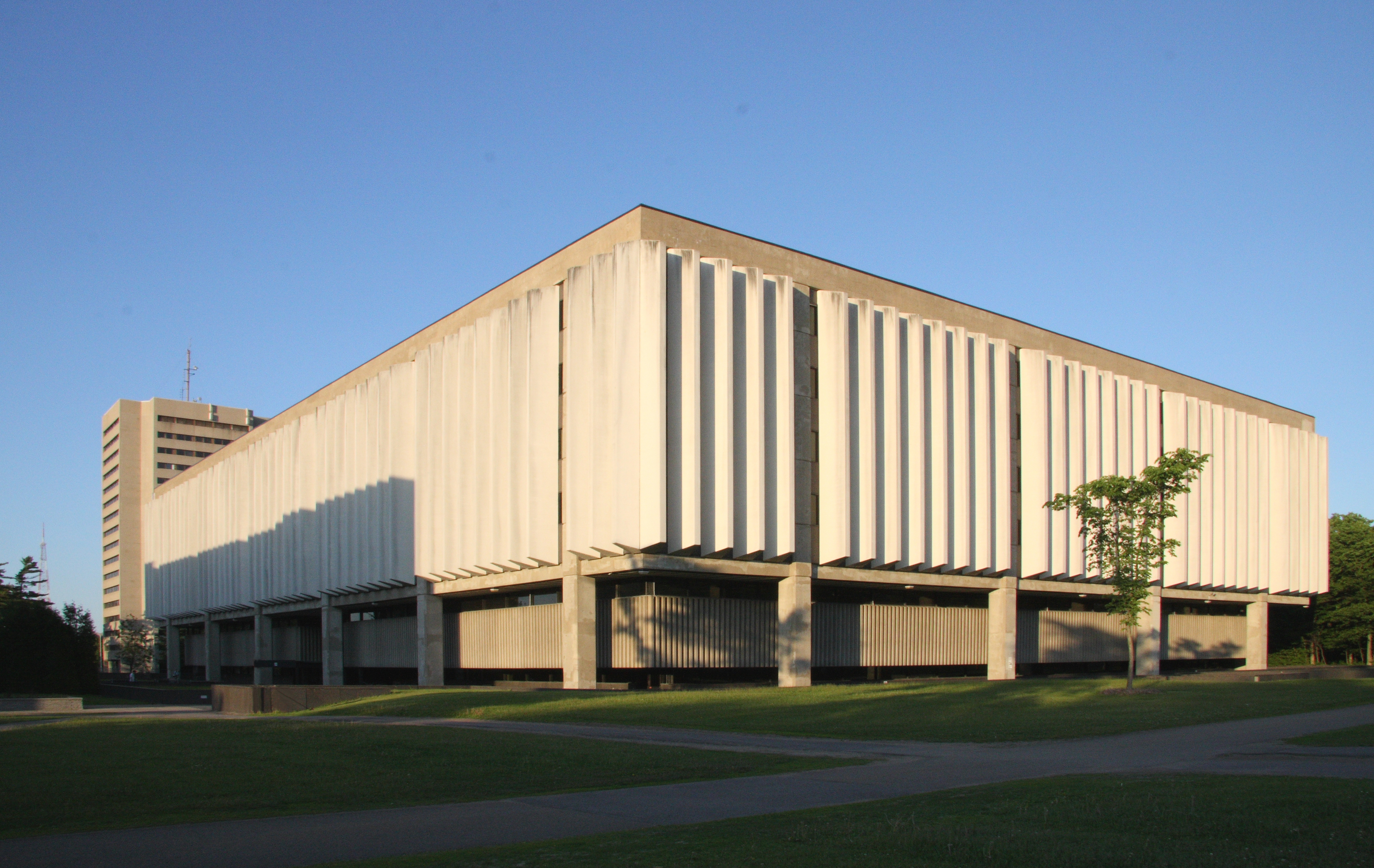
Jean-Charles Bonenfant building (social sciences, humanities, and law library)

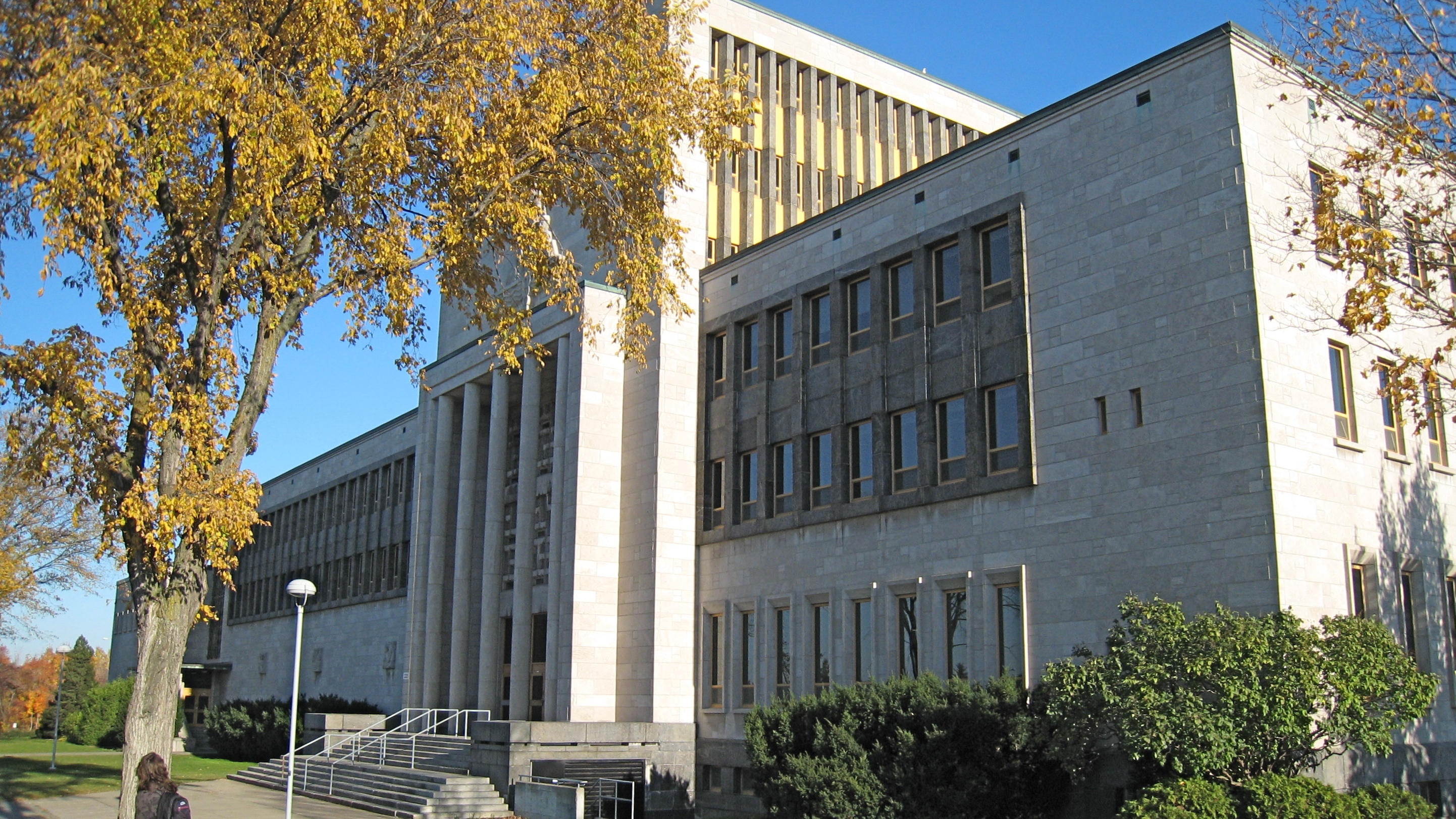
Palasis-Prince building (administrative sciences)

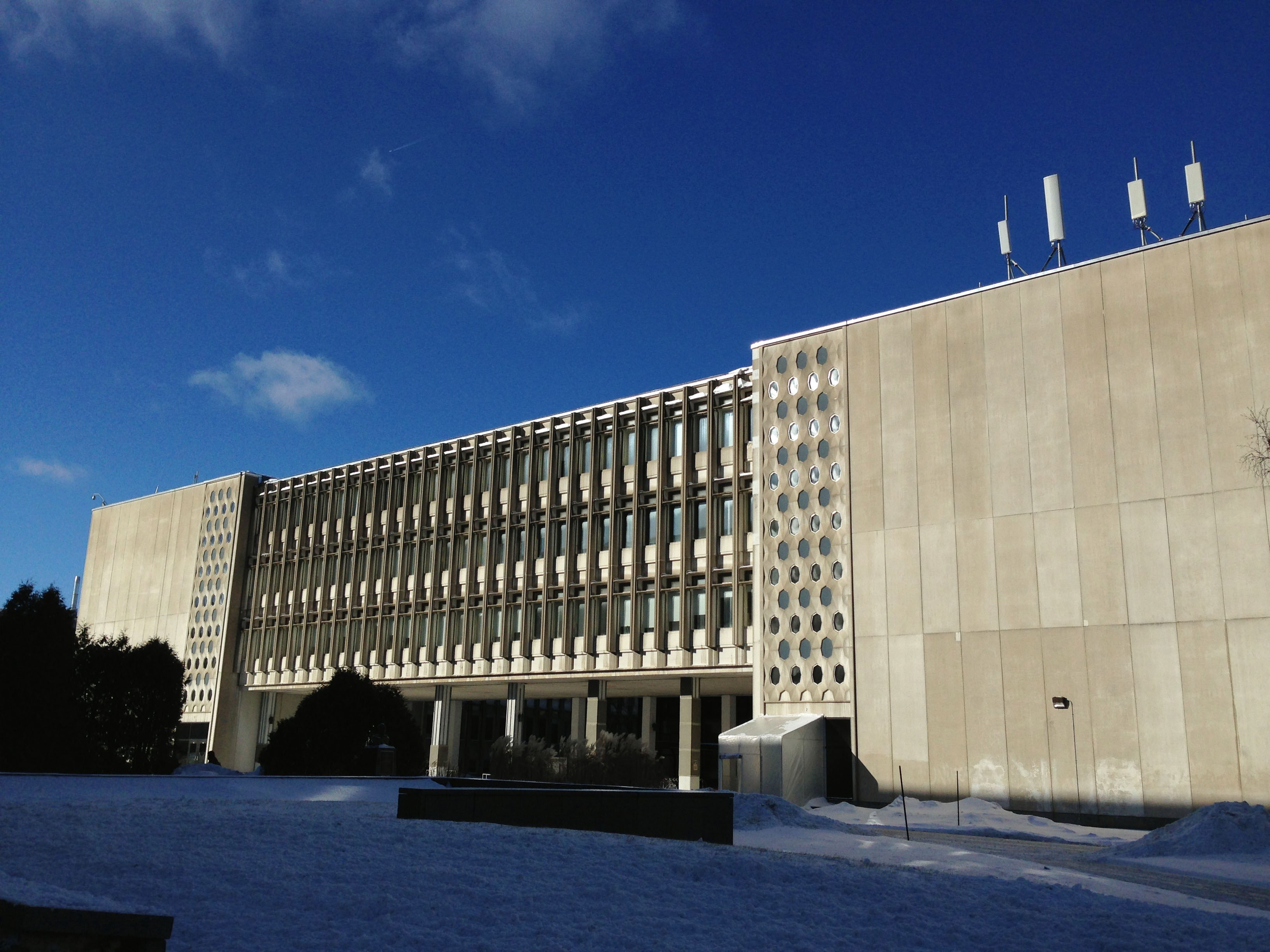
Charles-De Koninck building (social sciences, humanities, and law)

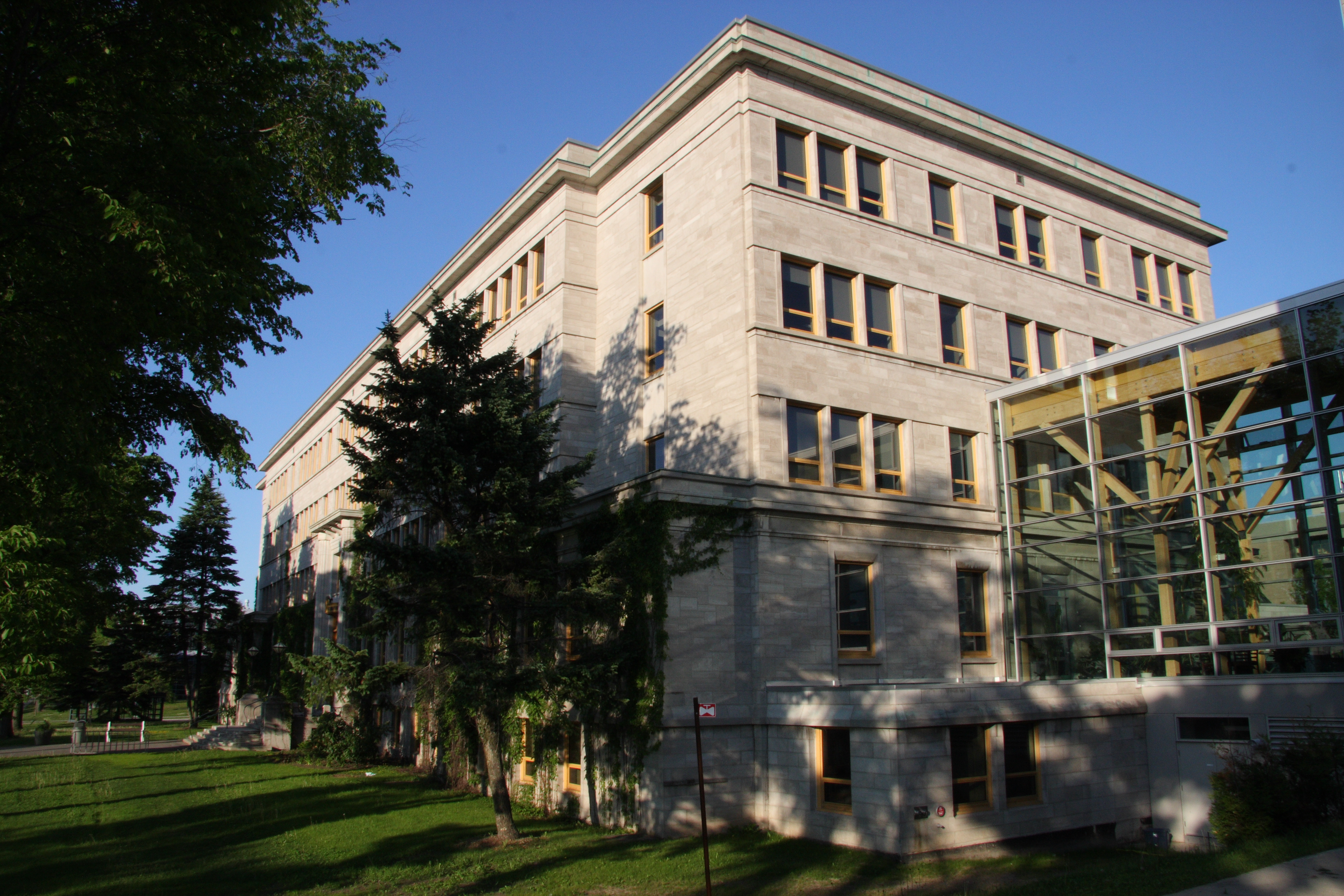
Abitibi-Price building (forestry, geography and geomatics)

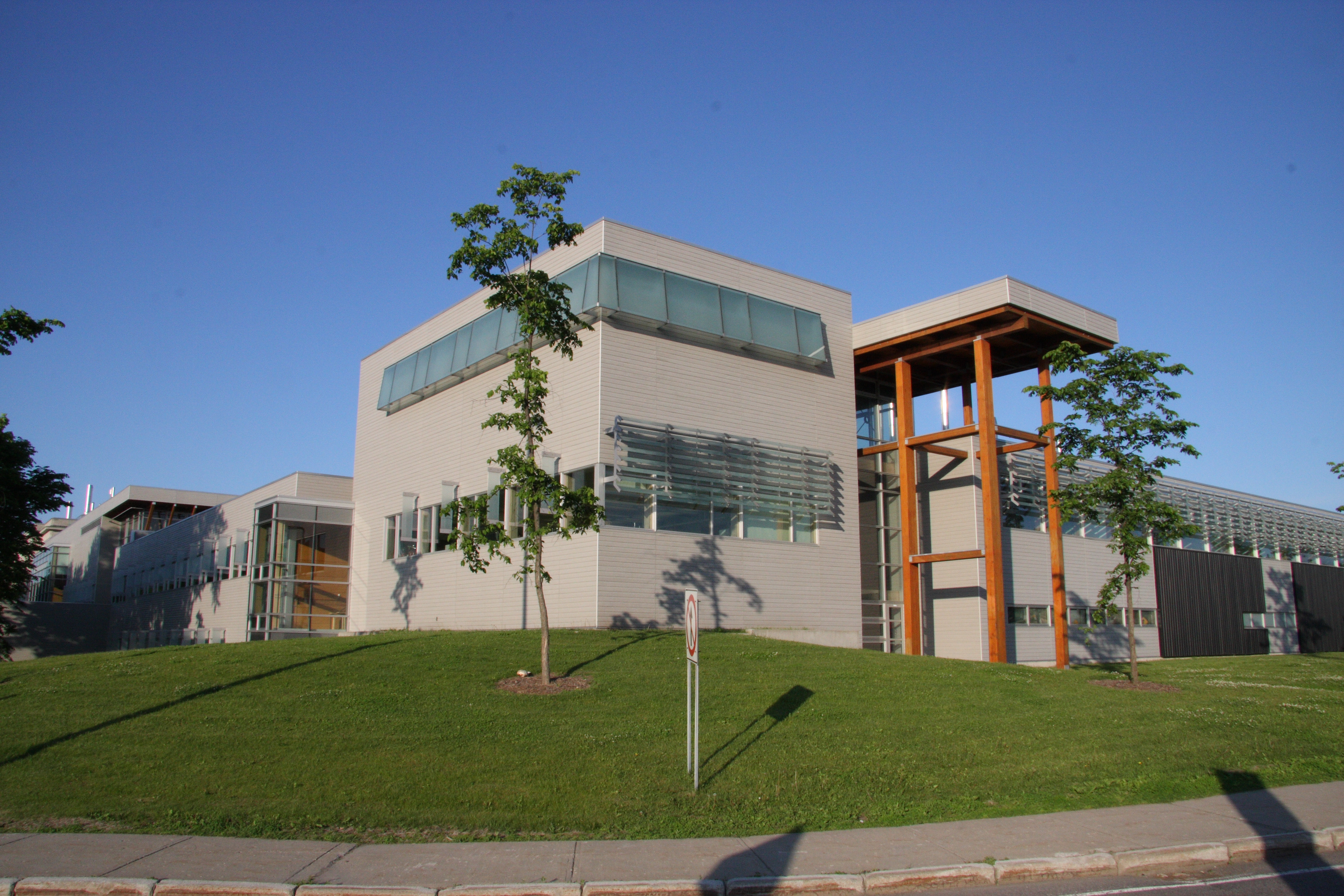
Gene-H.-Kruger building (wood research)

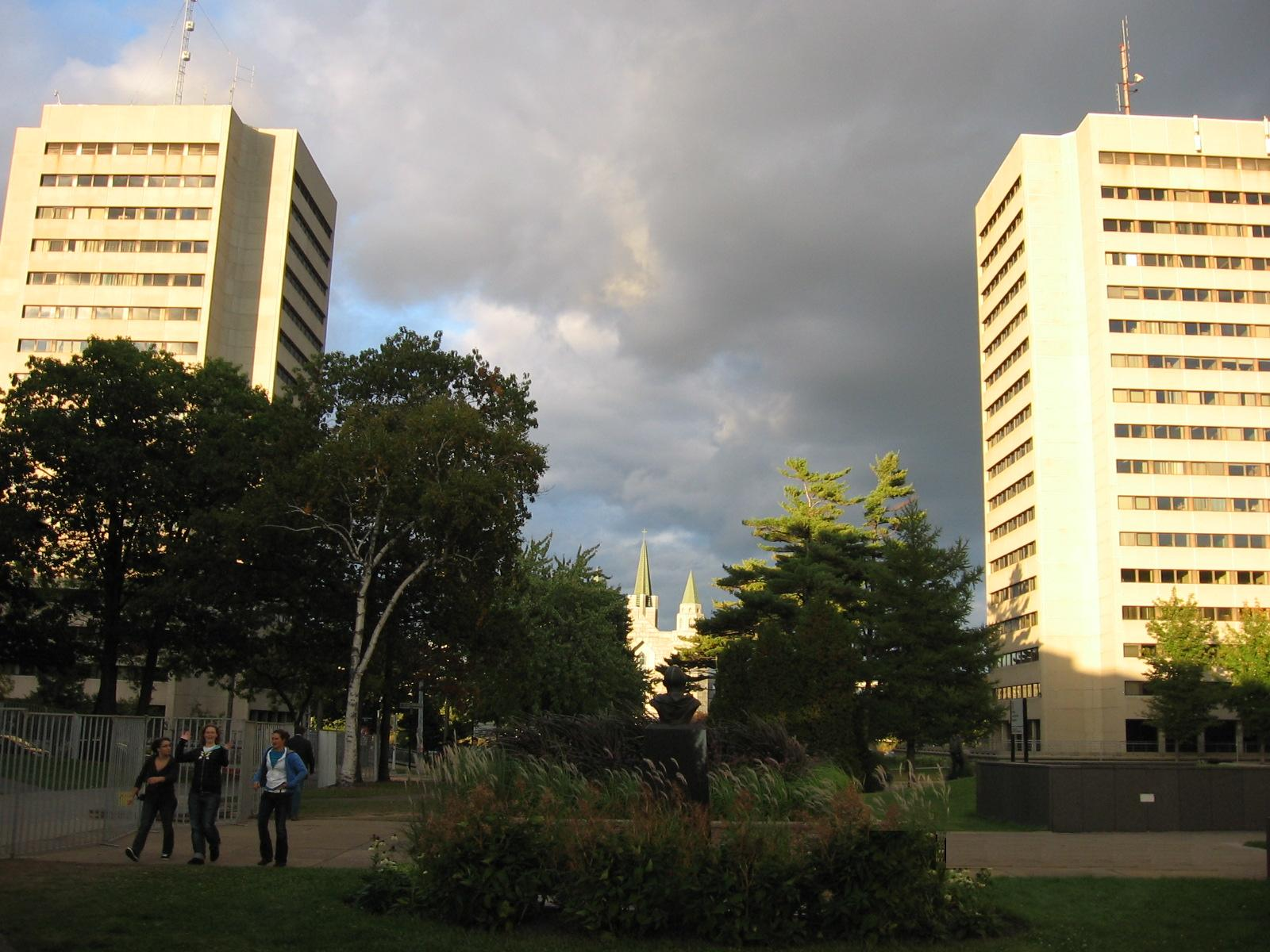
Jeanne Lapointe (left) and Felix-Antoine Savard (right) buildings

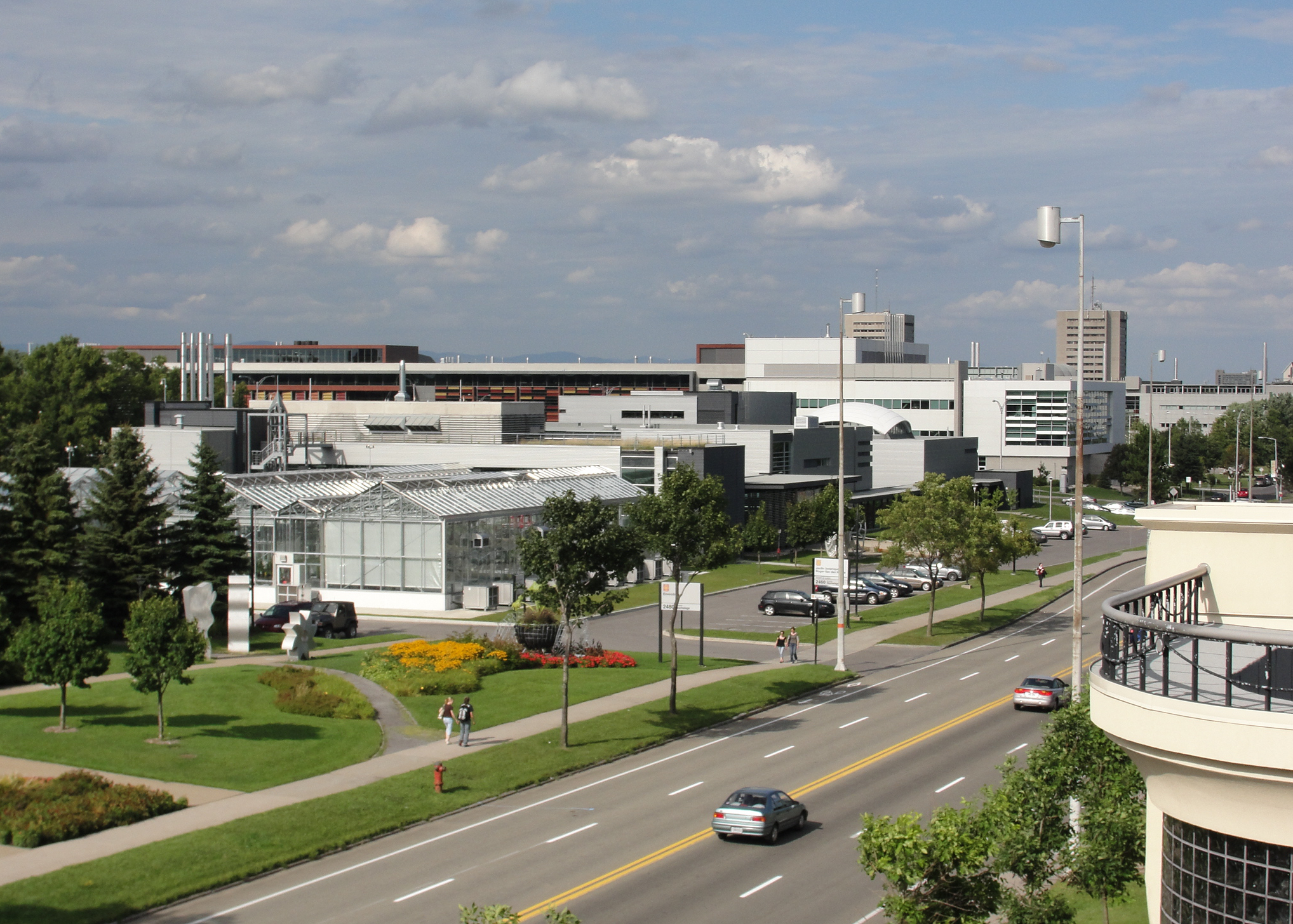
Western end of the campus

=== Other infrastructure ===
Practically all buildings are linked by 10 km (6.2 mi) of underground walkways, which are particularly useful in the winter and whose walls are mostly covered by murals painted by student associations and student visitors over the years, as well as graffiti. The campus is also home to the Roger-Van den Hende botanical garden (fr) which contains some 67 species of deciduous and coniferous trees and 60 different species of birds. The Louis-Jacques-Casault building also hosts the regional branch of the National Archives of Quebec. The sport building is called PEPS and is said to be the largest sport complex in eastern Canada. It is adjacent to the covered TELUS stadium. Construction for the Telus stadium started in 2010 and was opened to the public in January 2012 (fr).

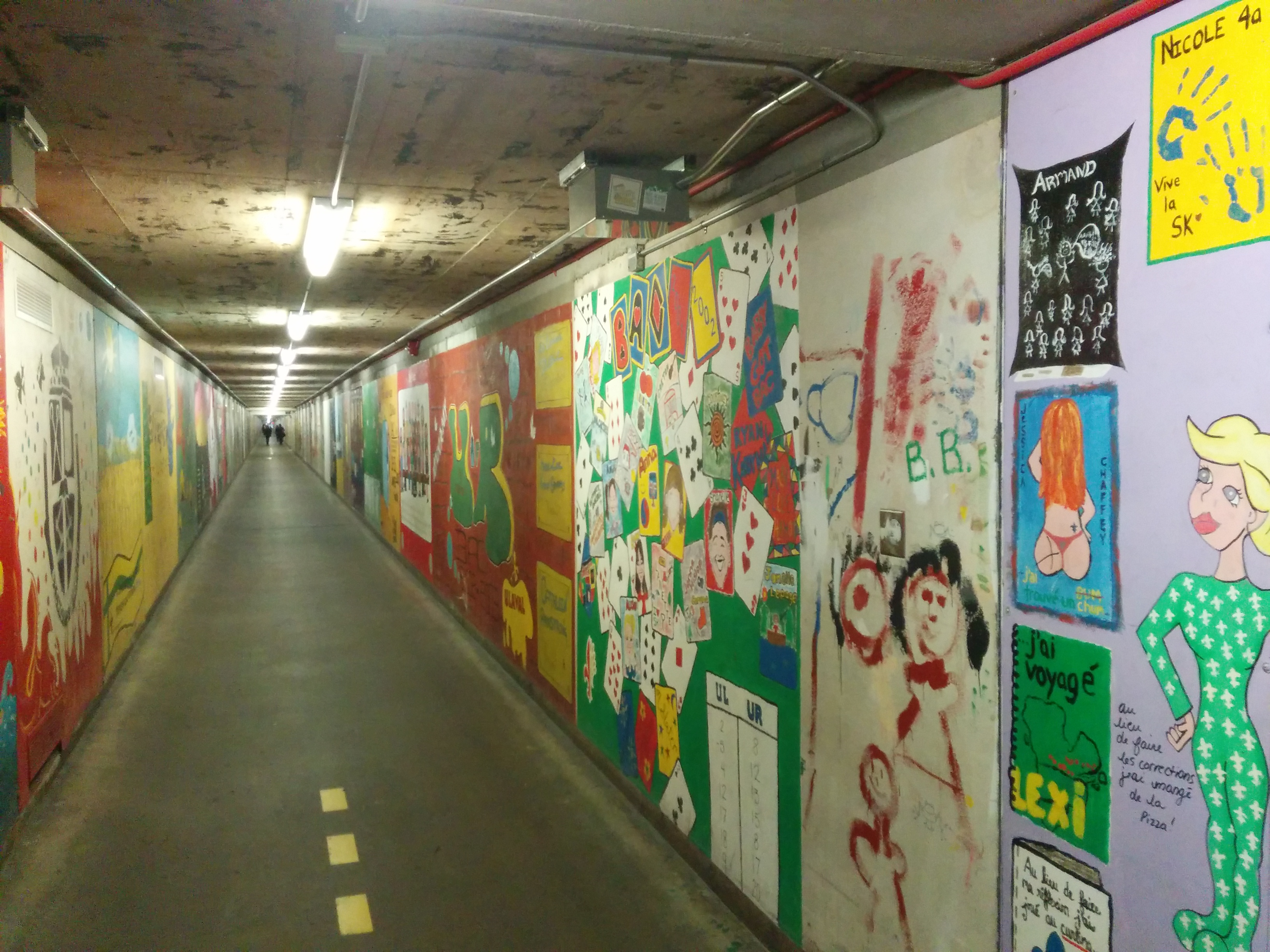
Pedestrian tunnel

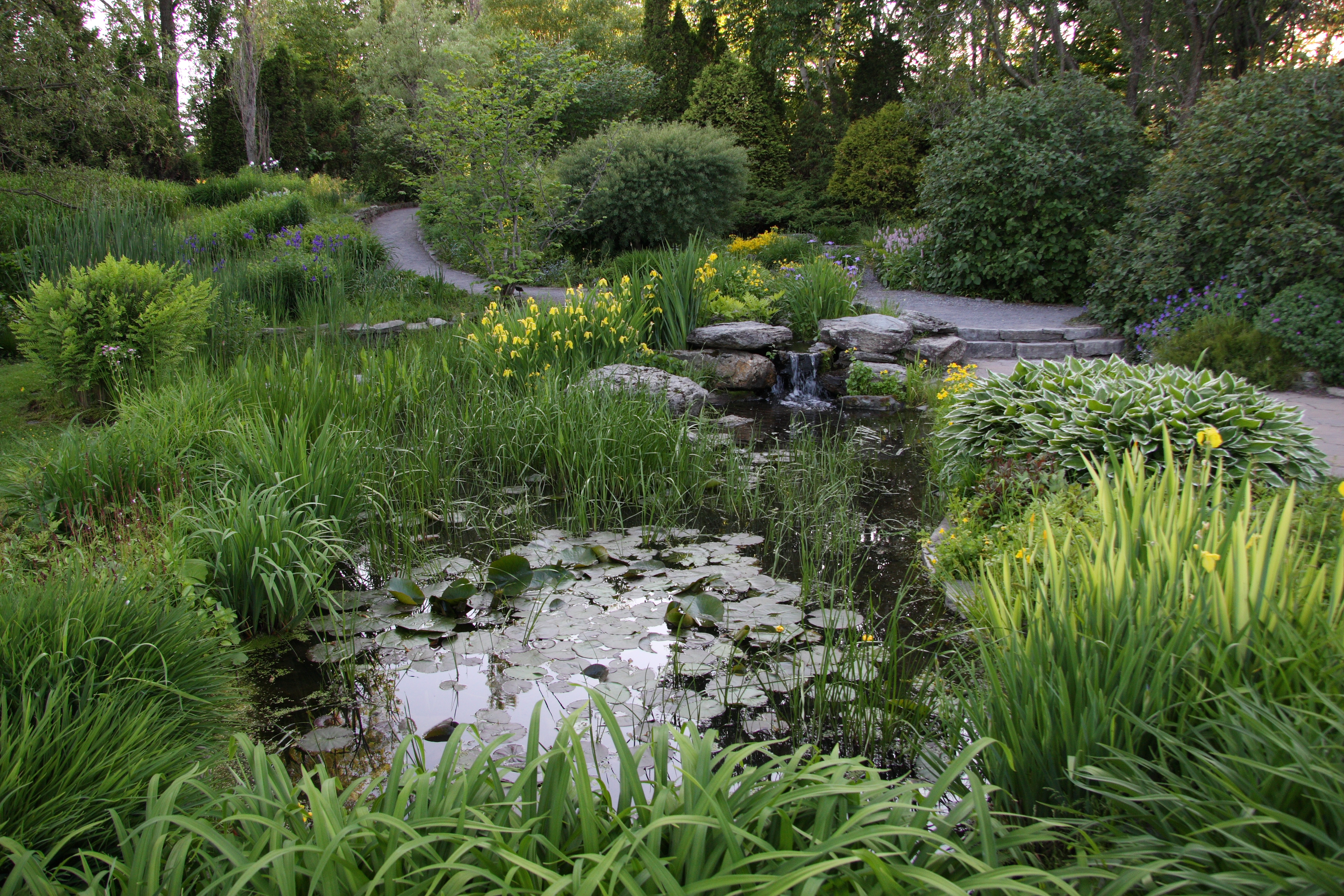
Water Garden at Roger-Van den Hende botanical garden

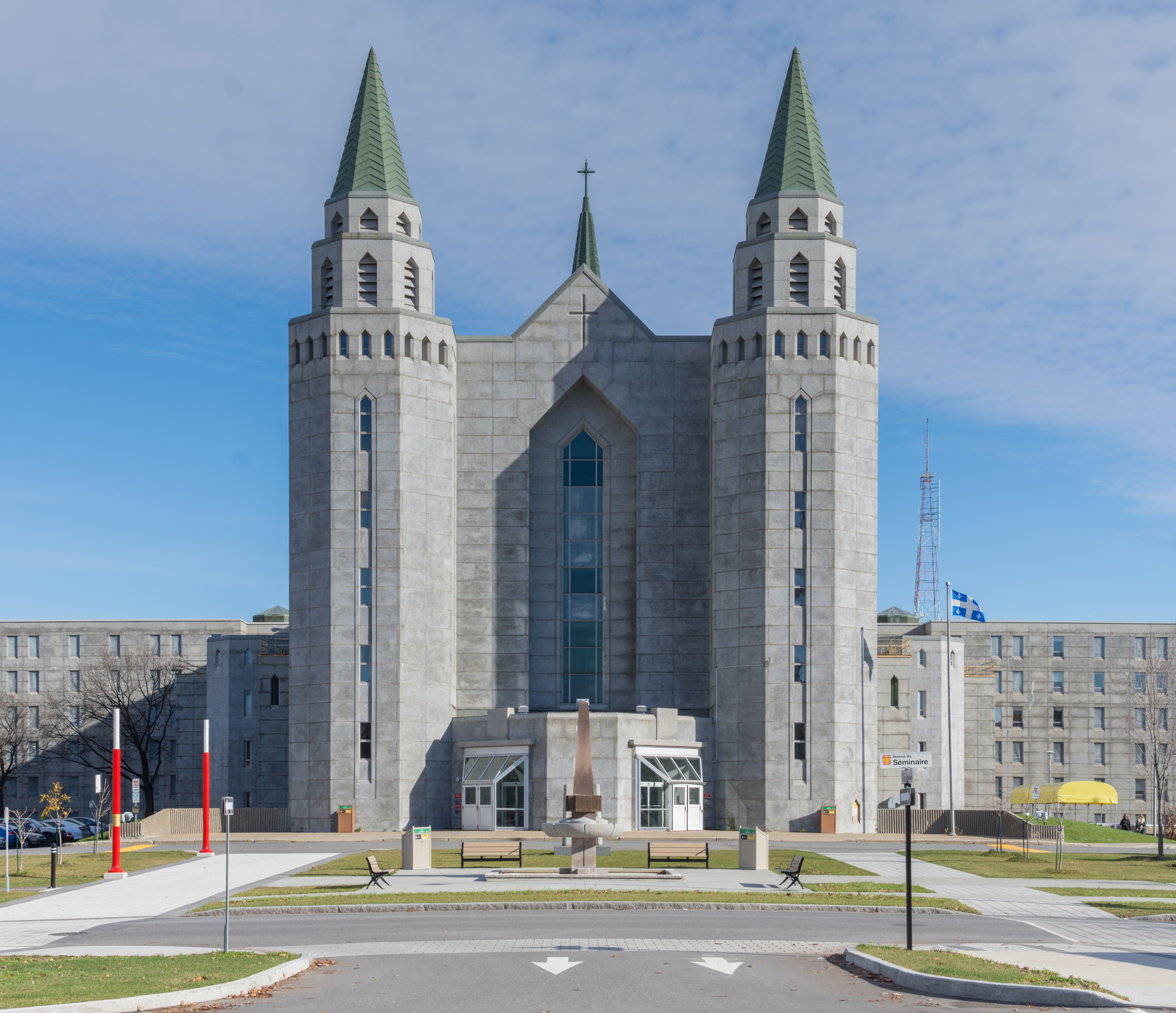
A branch of the National Archives is found in Pavillon Casault

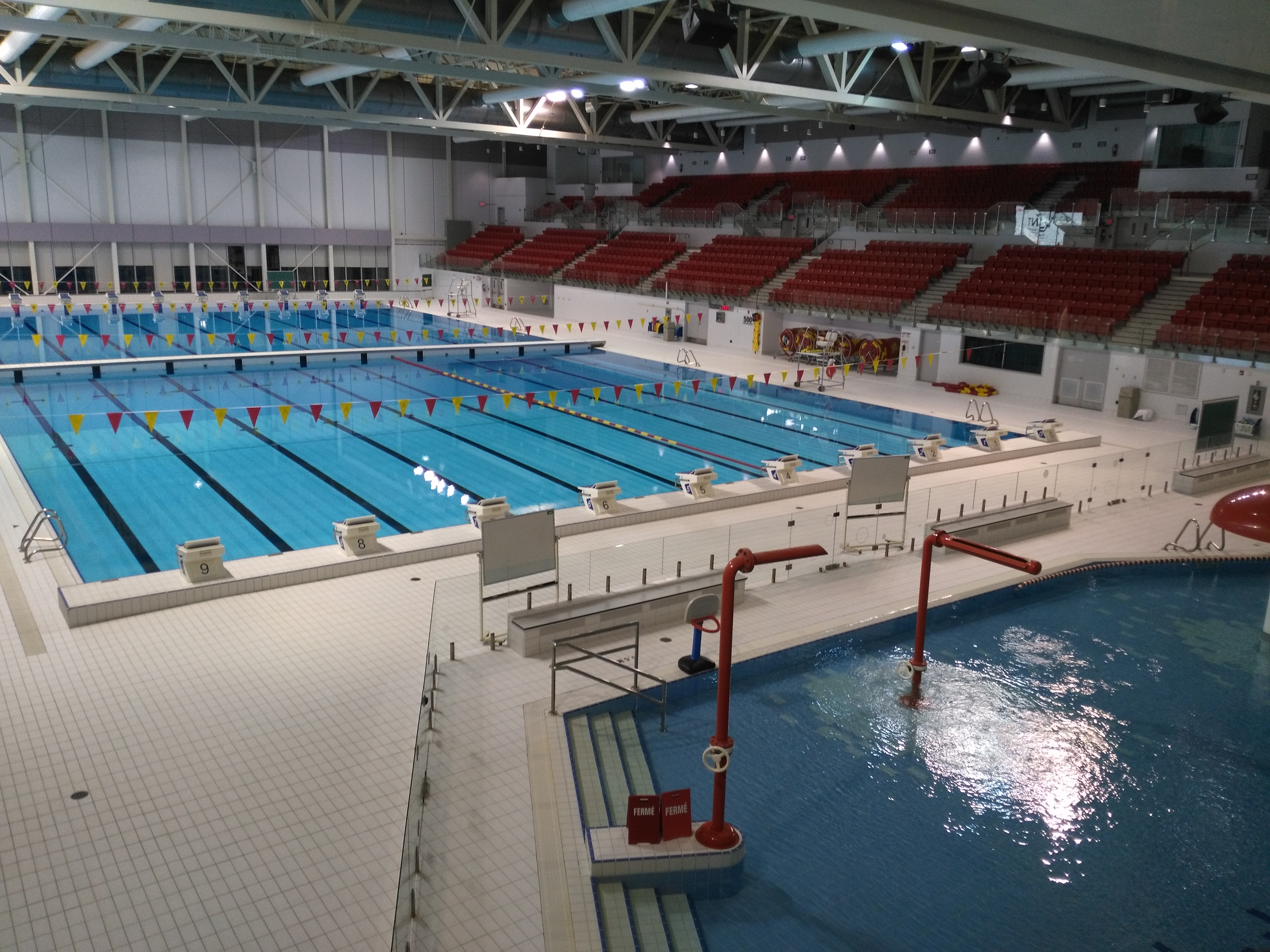
Olympic swimming pool inside the PEPS complex

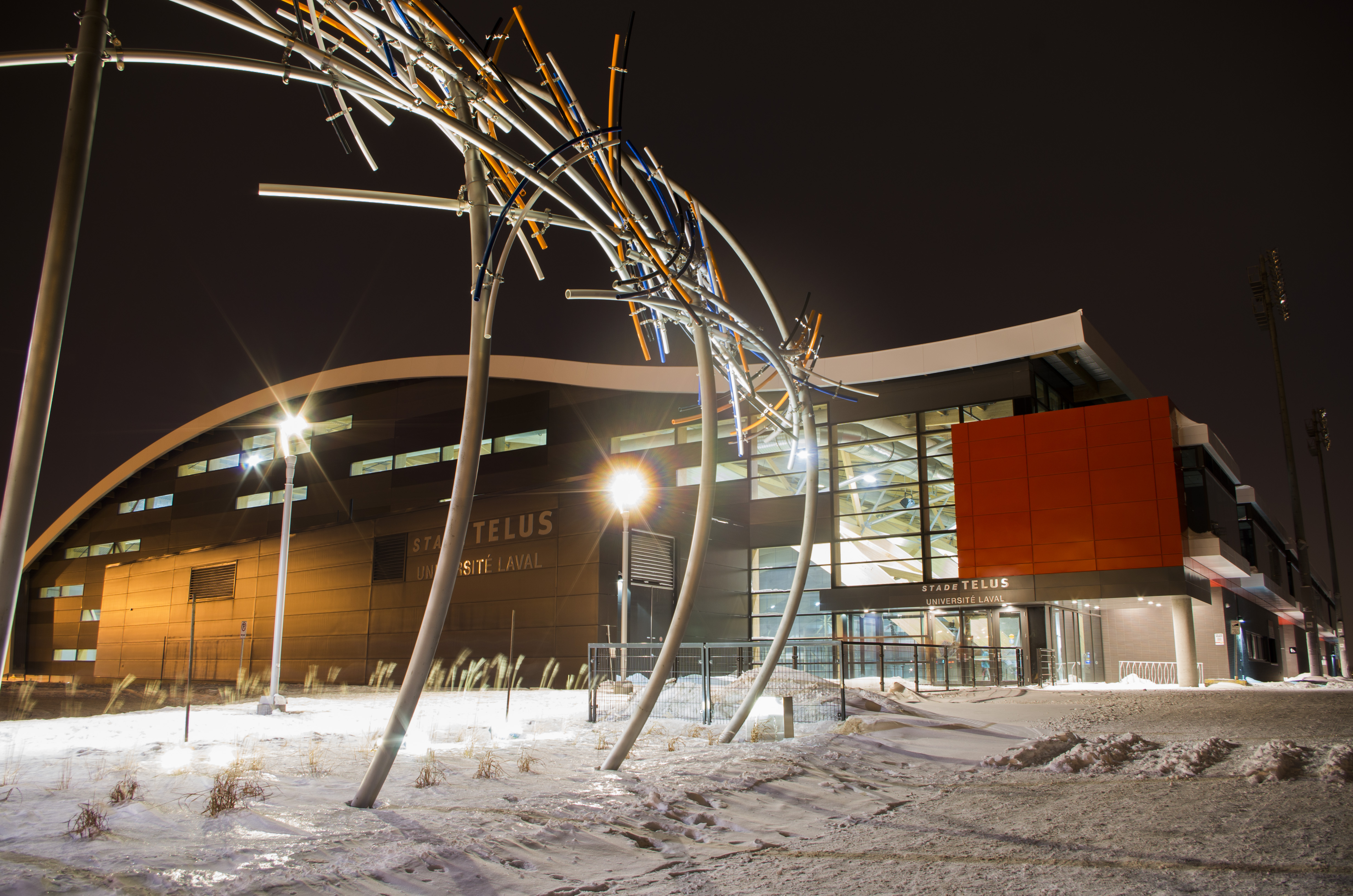
TELUS stadium

=== Off campus ===
Apart from the school of architecture, located in Old Quebec since 1988, the only out of campus facilities are the school of visual arts in the downtown neighbourhood of Saint-Roch, and the experimental Montmorency forest (70 km (43 mi) north of Quebec City).

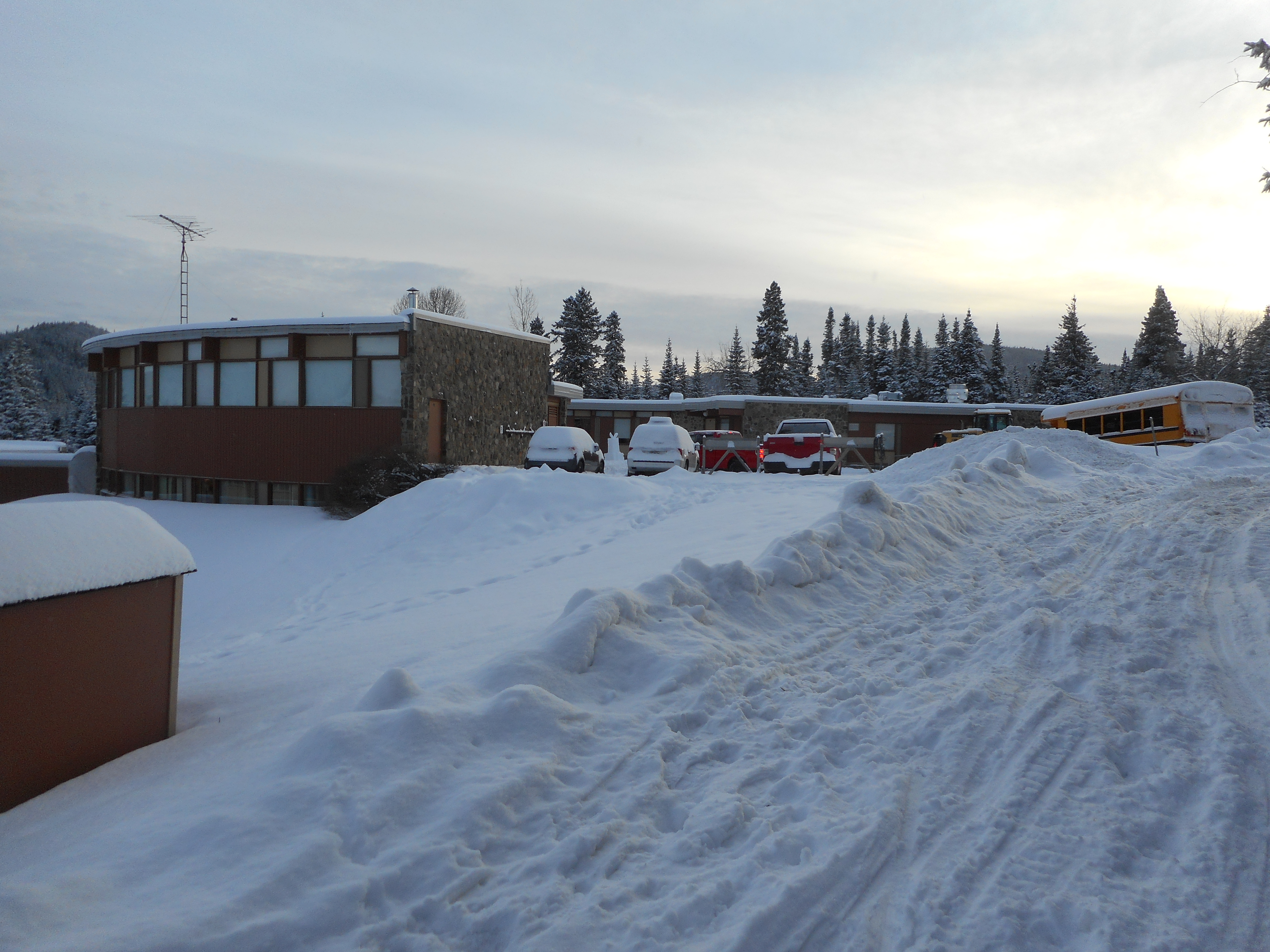
A facility of the experimental forest

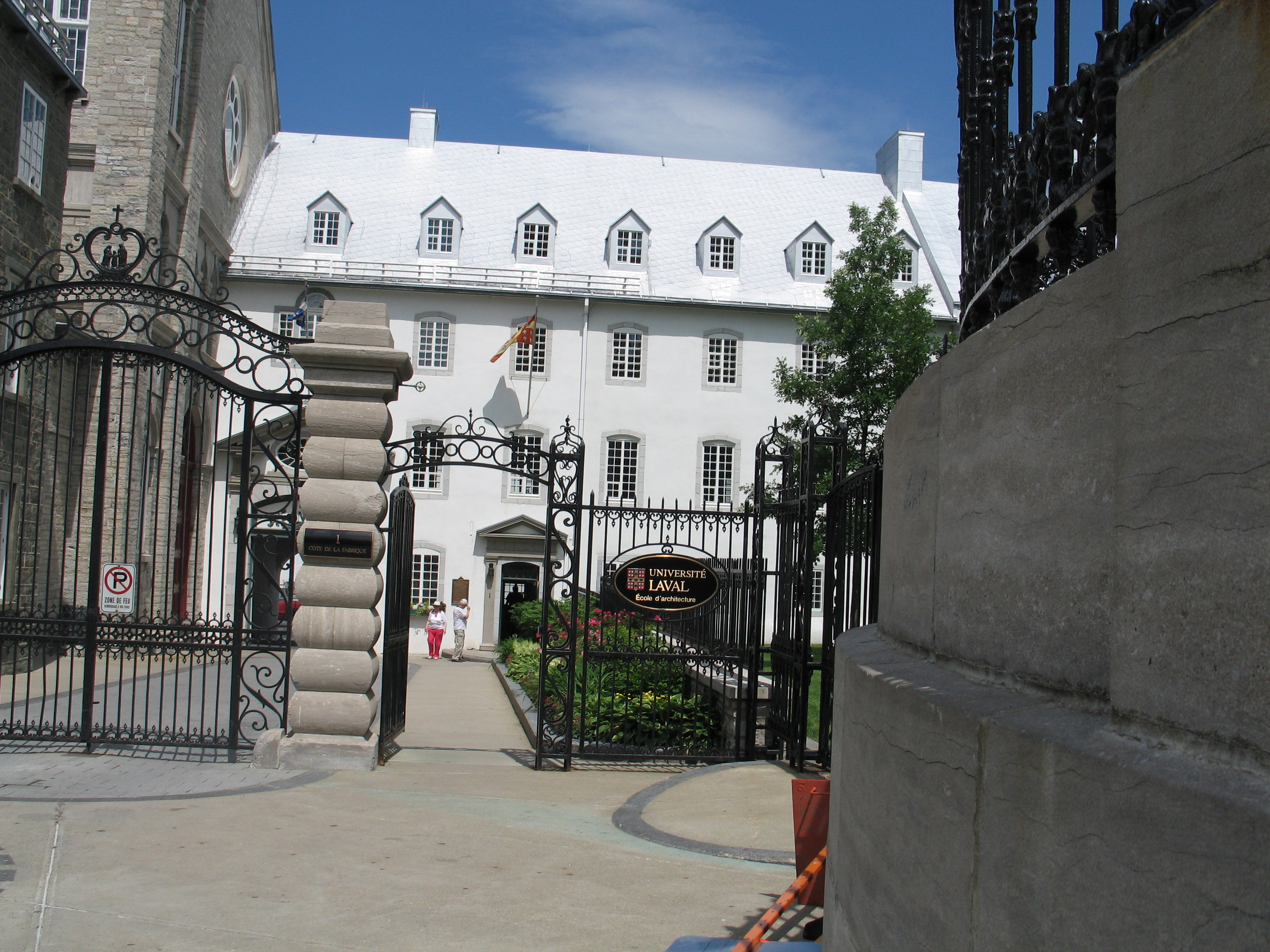
The school of architecture

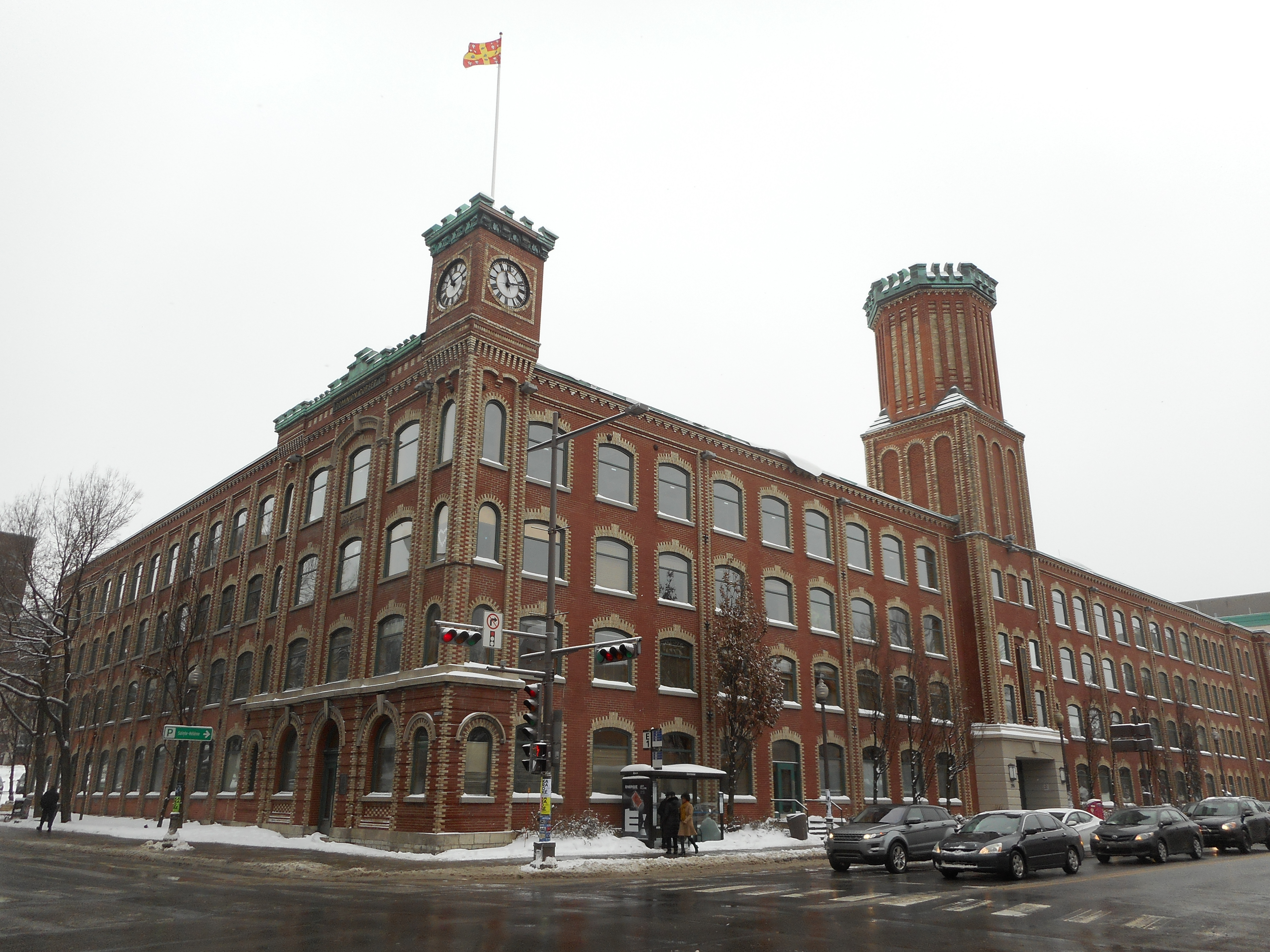
La Fabrique building hosts the school of art

== Programs ==
As of 2002, Université Laval offered over 350 programs to more than 38,000 students. The university also attracts more than 2,500 foreign students annually, and has almost 1,000 students drawn from Canadian provinces outside of Quebec. Many students come to the university for the Français pour non-francophones program that offers instruction in French as a second language to students from Canada and around the world. It is also the only university in Quebec that trains forestry engineers.

Since the mid-1980s, Université Laval has offered distance learning; over 30 programs and 400 courses are offered by distance learning, of which 80% are accessible from the Internet.

== Faculties and schools ==
- Administrative Sciences
- Agriculture and Food sciences*
- Architecture, Urban planning and Visual arts
- Dentistry
- Education
- Faculté de Droit (Faculty of Law)
- Faculté des Lettres et des Sciences humaines (Letters and Humanities)
- Forestry, Geography and Geomatics**
- Hautes Études Internationales (HEI)
- Arts
- Medicine
- Music
- Nursing
- Pharmacy
- Philosophy
- Postgraduate Studies
- Science and Engineering
- Social Sciences
- Theology and Religious Studies

* The Département des Sciences des Aliments et de Nutrition has an accredited dietetic program. The university is accredited by a professional organization such as the Dietitians of Canada, and the university's graduates may subsequently become registered dietitians.
** The Faculty is part of the AUFSC and has accredited baccalaureate of science programs with specializations in forestry & environmental management; forestry operations (co-op) and forestry engineering.

== Research ==
Université Laval holds four of the 19 Canada Excellence Research Chairs awarded nationwide: Canada Excellence Research Chair in Remote Sensing of Canada's New Arctic Frontier, Canada Research Excellence Chair in the Microbiome-Endocannabinoidome Axis in Metabolic Health, Canada Excellence Research Chair in Photonic Innovations, and Communication and Canada Excellence Research Chair in Neurophotonics. The university has also received research funding from Huawei but has kept the details of the funding confidential.

Université Laval is an active member of the University of the Arctic. UArctic is an international cooperative network based in the Circumpolar Arctic region, consisting of more than 200 universities, colleges, and other organizations with an interest in promoting education and research in the Arctic region.

The university participates in UArctic's mobility program north2north. The aim of that program is to enable students of member institutions to study in different parts of the North.

== Rankings ==
University rankings

World rankings
- ARWU World: 301–400
- QS World: =469
- QS Employability: 201–250
- THE World: 251–300
- USNWR World: 439
- 13–16

Canadian rankings
- QS National: 18
- THE National: 11
- USNWR National: 16
- Maclean's Medical/Doctoral: 12
- Maclean's Reputation: 12

== University press ==
Les Presses de l'Université Laval (University Press), which was founded in 1950, deals with Canadian civilization, literature, medieval studies, law, social sciences, physical sciences and engineering. It publishes some 120 books per year.

== University cooperative ==
The Coopérative de l'Université Laval (University Co-op) is engaged in the sale of products to customers throughout the university, such as books, lecture notes and computers. They have two locations. One is on campus in the administrative building and the other near La Fabrique, the Arts building in Old Québec.

== Athletics and sports teams ==
Athletics take place at the Pavillon d'éducation physique et des sports (Physical Education and Sports Complex), in short PEPS. Laval's varsity sports teams are named the Rouge-et-Or (Red & Gold). As of 2024, the men's football team of Laval have won 12 Vanier Cups and has thus the most titles in the country, followed by the Western Mustangs (8 Vanier Cups).

== Notable people ==
Public figures, including Prime Ministers of Canada, Premiers of Quebec, Supreme Court Justices, federal Cabinet Ministers, Senators, and Lieutenant-Governors as well as national and international athletes have graduated from Université Laval. Some of the more prominent are:

- Prime Ministers of Canada: Louis St. Laurent, Brian Mulroney and Jean Chrétien
- Premiers of Quebec: Lucien Bouchard, Pierre-Joseph-Olivier Chauveau, Edmund James Flynn, Jean Lesage, René Lévesque, Pauline Marois, Simon-Napoléon Parent and Louis-Alexandre Taschereau
- Supreme Court Justices: Suzanne Côté, Louis LeBel, Claire L'Heureux-Dubé, Charles Fitzpatrick, Arthur Cyrille Albert Malouin, Lawrence Arthur Dumoulin Cannon, Louis-Philippe Pigeon, Julien Chouinard, Robert Taschereau, Henri-Elzéar Taschereau, Thibaudeau Rinfret
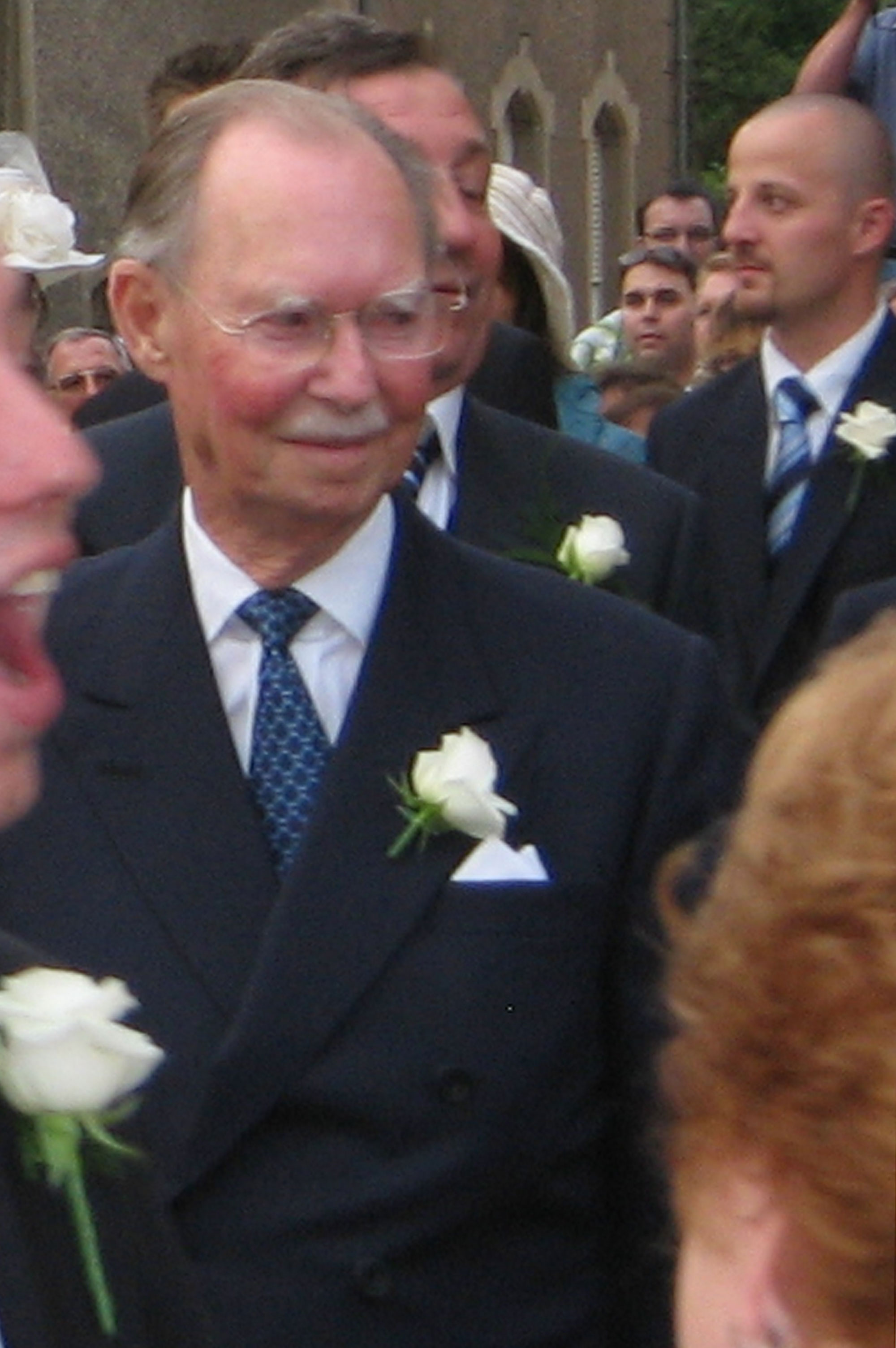
Jean, Grand Duke of Luxembourg.

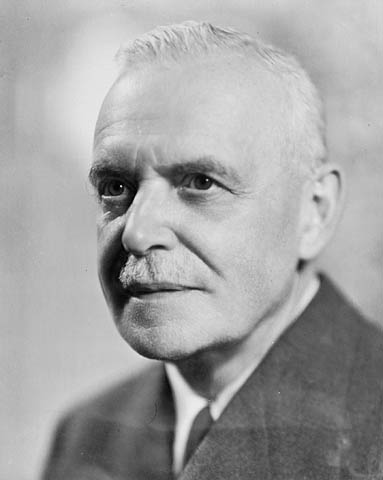
Louis St. Laurent, 12th Prime Minister of Canada.

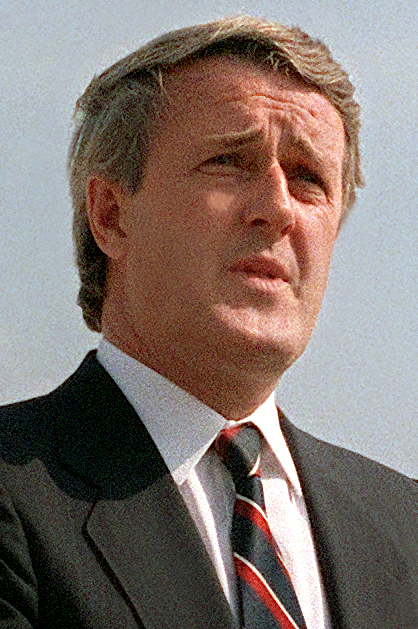
Brian Mulroney, 18th Prime Minister of Canada.

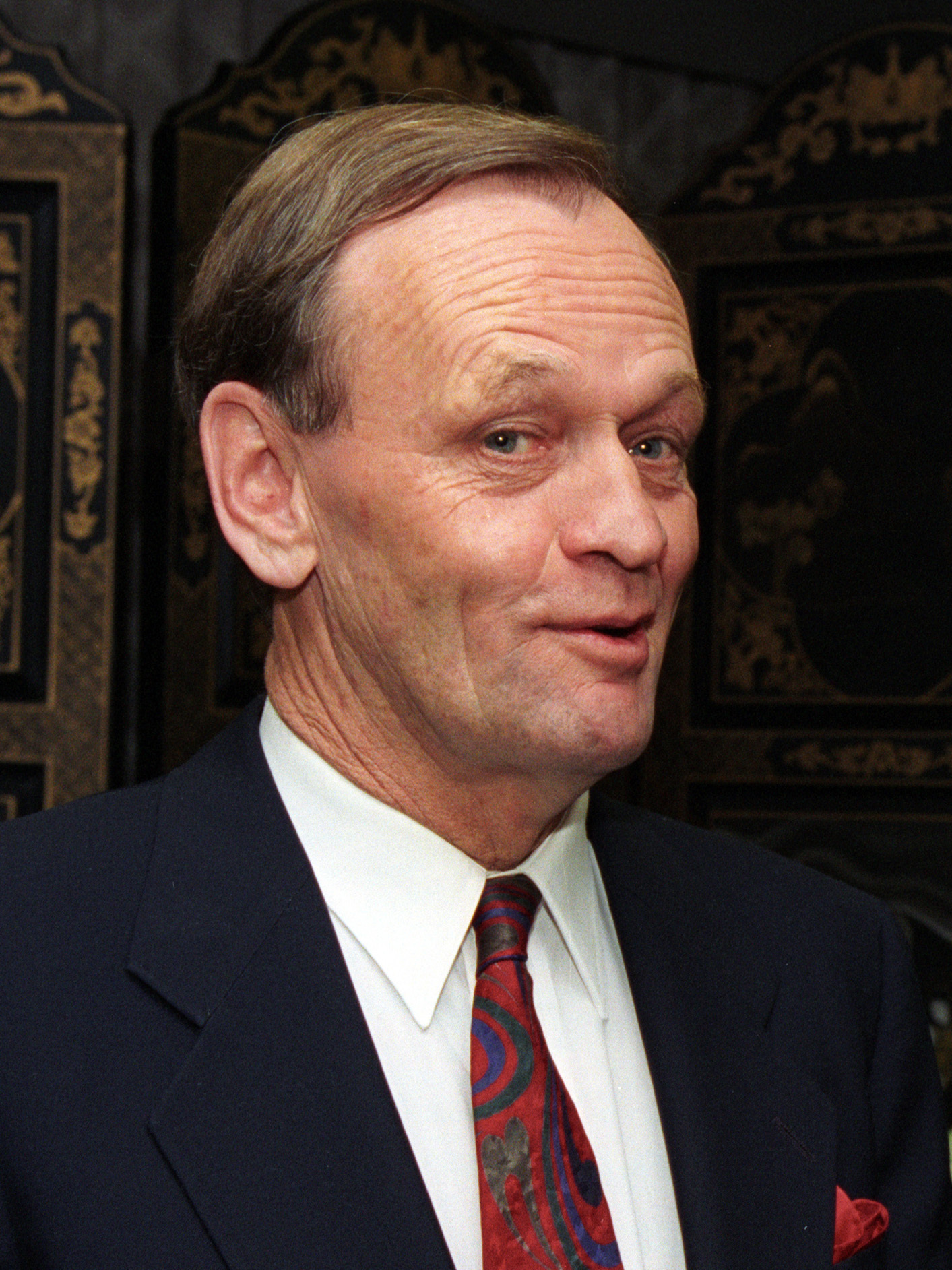
Jean Chrétien, 20th Prime Minister of Canada.

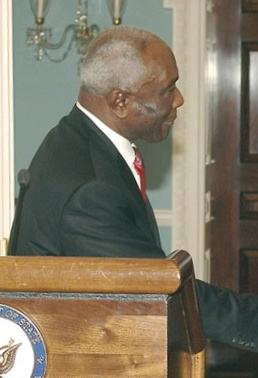
Jacques-Édouard Alexis, 9th Prime Minister of Haiti.

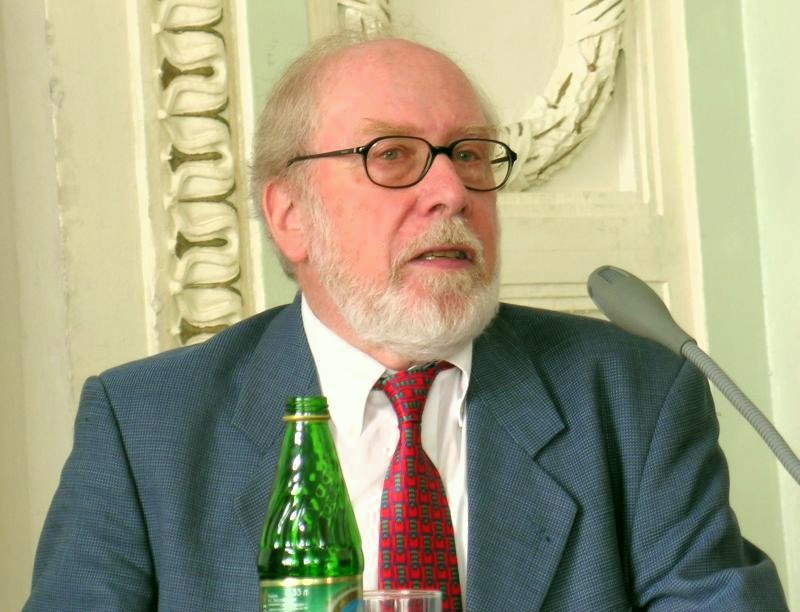
Niklaus Wirth, designer of several programming languages.

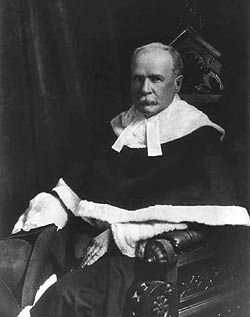
Charles Fitzpatrick, fifth Chief Justice of Canada.

== See also ==
- List of universities in Quebec
- List of universities in Canada
- Group of Thirteen (Canadian universities)
- Laval Thomism
- Jérôme Demers
- List of oldest universities by region
- Quebec City
- Canadian university scientific research organizations
- Higher education in Quebec
- CHYZ campus radio station
- Medicago Inc.
