= Wilfrid Beaudry =

French-Canadian composer

- Born: 1891; Quebec

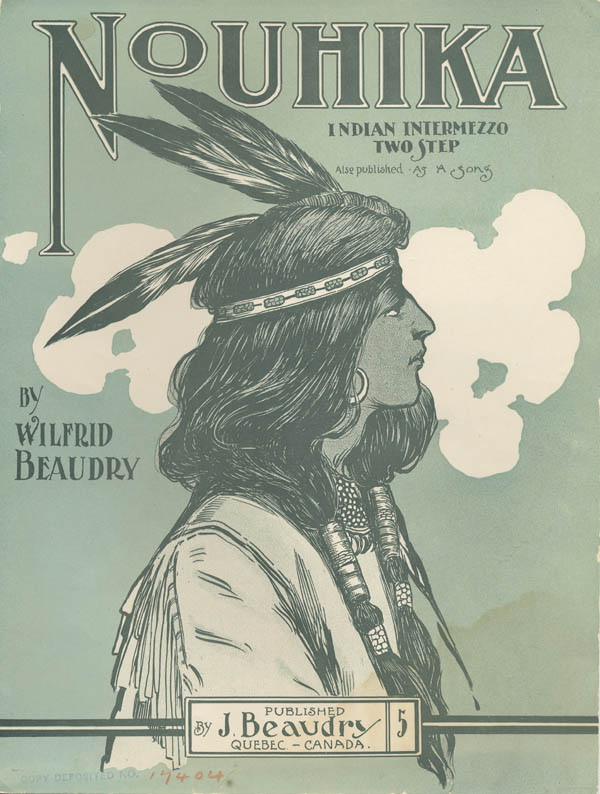
Wilfred Beaudry - Nouhika - sheetmusic cover (1904)

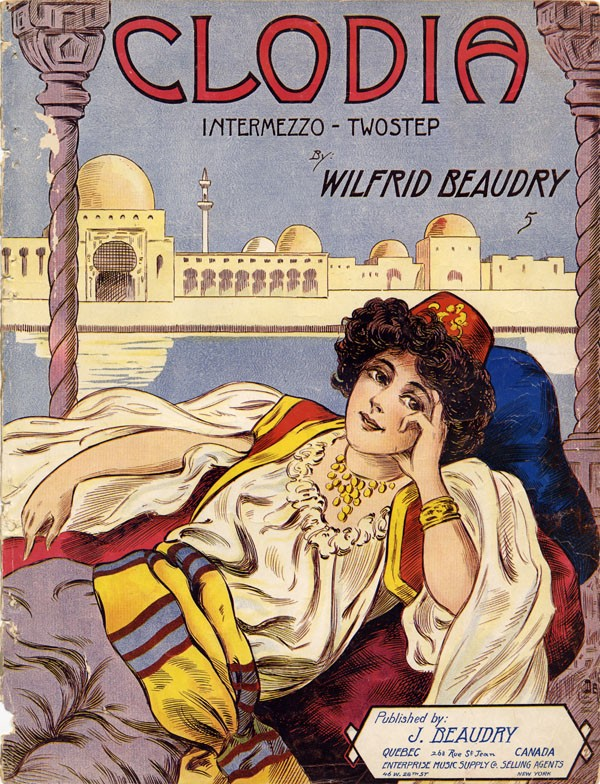
Wilfred Beaudry - Clodia - sheetmusic cover (1908)

Wilfrid Edouard Beaudry (1891-19??) was a French-Canadian composer of two-steps and waltzes from the ragtime era.

He was born and lived in Quebec.

His published works include

- 1904 - The Yankee in Quebec - two-step
- 1904 - Violettes
- 1904 - Nouhika - Indian intermezzo two-step
- 1905 - Hakama, a Japanese Jingle
- 1905 - Valse Des Amours
- 1906 - Laval: Valse - dedicated to the students at Laval University and the University of Montreal.
- 1908 - Clodia
- 1909 - 1909 pas de deux
- 1910 - Carnaval
- 1927 - J'ai connu le secret du bonheur
