= Dietitians of Canada =

Dietitians of Canada (DC), or Les Diététistes du Canada in French, is the professional organization and "nation-wide voice of dietitians in Canada". As an organization DC is active at the local, provincial, national and international levels and has 6000 members which meet their academic and experience standards. DC is the accrediting body for all university and training programs that credential dietitians to practice in Canada. DC is part of the International Confederation of Dietetic Associations.
