= 2017 Gatineau municipal election =

Municipal election in Quebec, Canada

- Mayoral election
← 2013	November 5, 2017	2021 →
- Registered: 196,255
- Turnout: 38.52% (▼3.34pp)
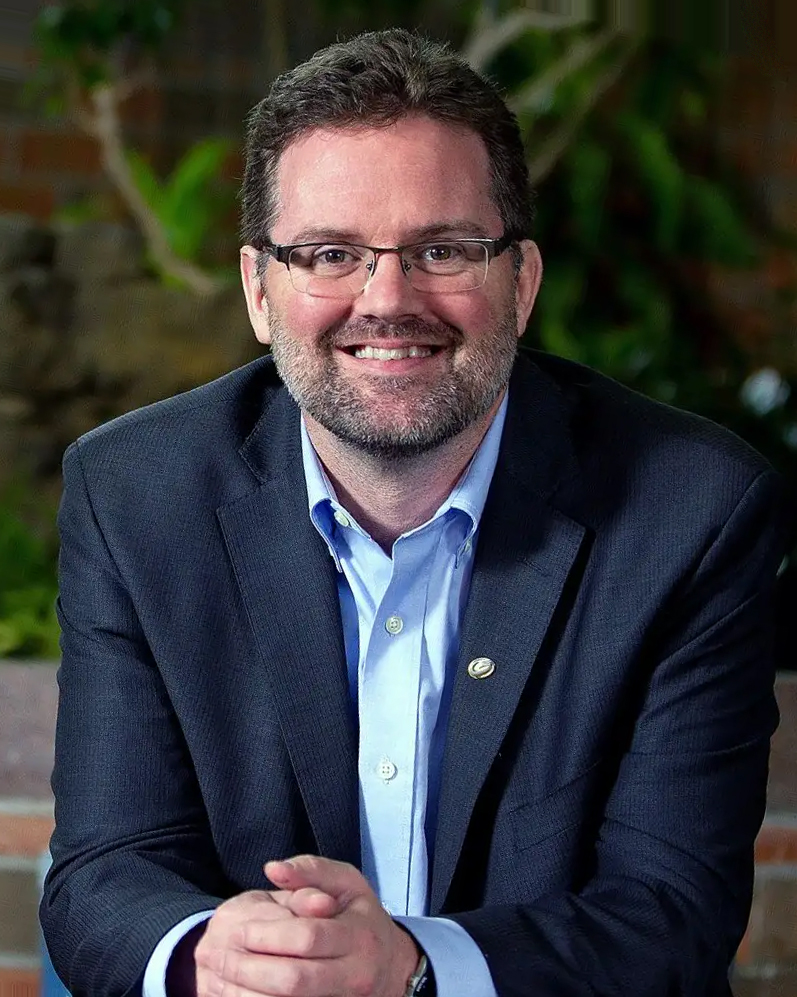
		DT	SG
Nominee	Maxime Pedneaud-Jobin	Denis Tassé	Sylvie Goneau
Party	Action Gatineau	Independent	Independent
Popular vote	33,537	22,295	12,964
Percentage	45.14%	30.01%	17.45%
Mayor before election
Maxime Pedneaud-Jobin
Action Gatineau
Elected mayor
Maxime Pedneaud-Jobin
Action Gatineau
- City Council election
← 2013	November 5, 2017	2021 →
- 18 seats on Gatineau City Council (Note: The Mayor is a member of City Council, but for the purposes of documentation is treated as their own individual.); 10 seats needed for a majority
- Turnout: 30.42%
Party	Leader	Vote %	Seats	+/–
Independent	–	61.29	12	−2
AG	Maxime Pedneaud-Jobin	38.71	6	+2
This lists parties that won seats. See the complete results below.

The 2017 Gatineau municipal election was held on Sunday, November 5, 2017, to elect a mayor and city councillors in Gatineau, Quebec, Canada. The election was held on the same day as the 2017 Quebec municipal elections.

== Mayoral race ==
Party	Mayoral candidate	Vote	%
Équipe Pedneaud-Jobin - Action Gatineau	Maxime Pedneaud-Jobin (X)	33,537	45.14
Independent	Denis Tassé	22,295	30.01
Independent	Sylvie Goneau	12,964	17.45
Independent	Clément Bélanger	3,739	5.03
Independent	Rémi Bergeron	1,761	2.37
Total valid votes		74,296	38.52

=== Opinion polls ===
Polling firm	Last date of polling	Link	Pedneaud-Jobin	Tassé	Goneau	Bélanger	Bergeron	Don't know/ Wouldn't vote
Segma Research	October 14, 2017	HTML	53.0	23.9	13.7	4.7	4.7	21.4

== Aylmer District ==
Party	Candidate	Vote	%
Independent	Audrey Bureau	3,271	76.55
Action Gatineau	François Sylvestre	835	19.54
Independent	David Inglis	167	3.91

== Lucerne District ==
Party	Candidate	Vote	%
Independent	Gilles Chagnon	1,996	41.95
Action Gatineau	Véronic Boyer	1,643	34.53
Independent	Mamadou Garanké Bah	835	17.55
Independent	Roch Givogue	284	5.97

== Deschênes District ==
Party	Candidate	Vote	%
Independent	Mike Duggan (X)	2,282	53.14
Action Gatineau	Richard M. Bégin (X)	2,012	46.86

== Plateau District ==
2017 Gatineau municipal election: Plateau
Party	Candidate	Popular vote			Expenditures
Party	Candidate	Votes	%	±%	Expenditures
Action Gatineau	Maude Marquis-Bissonnette	Acclaimed	–	–	none listed
Independent	~~Patrick Doyon~~	Withdrew	–	–	none listed
Total valid votes		–	–		
Total rejected, unmarked and declined votes		–	–	–	
Turnout		–	–	–	
Eligible voters		–			
Note: Candidate campaign colours, unless a member of a party, may be based on the prominent colour used in campaign items (signs, literature, etc.) or colours used in polling graphs and are used as a visual differentiation between candidates.
Sources: Office of the City Clerk of Gatineau

== Manoir-des-Trembles-Val-Tétreau District ==
Party	Candidate	Vote	%
Independent	Jocelyn Blondin (X)	2,069	51.82
Action Gatineau	Mélisa Ferreira	1,924	48.18

== l'Orée-du-Parc District ==
Party	Candidate	Vote	%
Action Gatineau	Isabelle N. Miron	2,356	52.25
Independent	Marc-André Pelletier	2,153	47.75

== Parc-de-la-Montagne-Saint-Raymond District ==
Party	Candidate	Vote	%
Independent	Louise Boudrias (X)	2,527	65.35
Action Gatineau	Yolaine Ruel	1,340	34.65

== Hull-Wright District ==
Party	Candidate	Vote	%
Action Gatineau	Cédric Tessier (X)	1,199	44.03
Independent	Pierre Samson	691	25.38
Independent	René Coignaud	483	17.74
Independent	Marcel Pépin	350	12.85

== Limbour District ==
Party	Candidate	Vote	%
Action Gatineau	Renée Amyot	3,038	56.76
Independent	Paul Loyer	1,187	22.18
Independent	Denis Pageau	1,127	21.06

== Touraine District ==
Party	Candidate	Vote	%
Independent	Nathalie Lemieux	2,449	58.73
Independent	Yves Durand	655	15.71
Action Gatineau	Mahmoud Rida	603	14.46
Independent	Charles Monette	463	11.10

== Pointe-Gatineau District ==
Party	Candidate	Vote	%
Action Gatineau	Myriam Nadeau (X)	1,910	60.35
Independent	Michel St-Amour	1,255	39.65

== Carrefour-de-l'Hôpital District ==
Party	Candidate	Vote	%
Independent	Gilles Carpentier (X)	2,569	65.92
Action Gatineau	Etienne Boulrice	1,328	34.08

== Versant District ==
Party	Candidate	Vote	%
Independent	Daniel Champagne (X)	3,148	71.14
Action Gatineau	Luc Gelinas	1,277	28.86

== Bellevue District ==
Party	Candidate	Vote	%
Independent	Pierre Lanthier	2,370	49.51
Action Gatineau	Romain Vanhooren	1,913	39.96
Independent	Jacques Perrier	504	10.53

== Lac-Beauchamp District ==
Party	Candidate	Vote	%
Independent	Jean-François LeBlanc (X)	2,153	61.18
Action Gatineau	Aurèle Desjardins	1,366	38.82

== Rivière-Blanche District ==
Party	Candidate	Vote	%
Independent	Jean Lessard (X)	2,184	47.46
Action Gatineau	Nathalie Lepage	1,294	28.12
Independent	Eric Bourgeau	1,124	24.42

== Masson-Angers District ==
Party	Candidate	Vote	%
Independent	Marc Carrière (X)	2,589	67.21
Action Gatineau	Alain Bergeron	901	23.39
Independent	Ghislain Larocque	362	9.40

== Buckingham District ==
Party	Candidate	Vote	%
Action Gatineau	Martin Lajeunesse (X)	2,181	56.17
Independent	Edmond Leclerc	1,702	43.83
