= Carrefour-de-l'Hôpital District =

Municipal electoral division in Gatineau, Quebec, Canada

District 13 - Carrefour-de-l'Hôpital
- Constituency for the Gatineau City Council
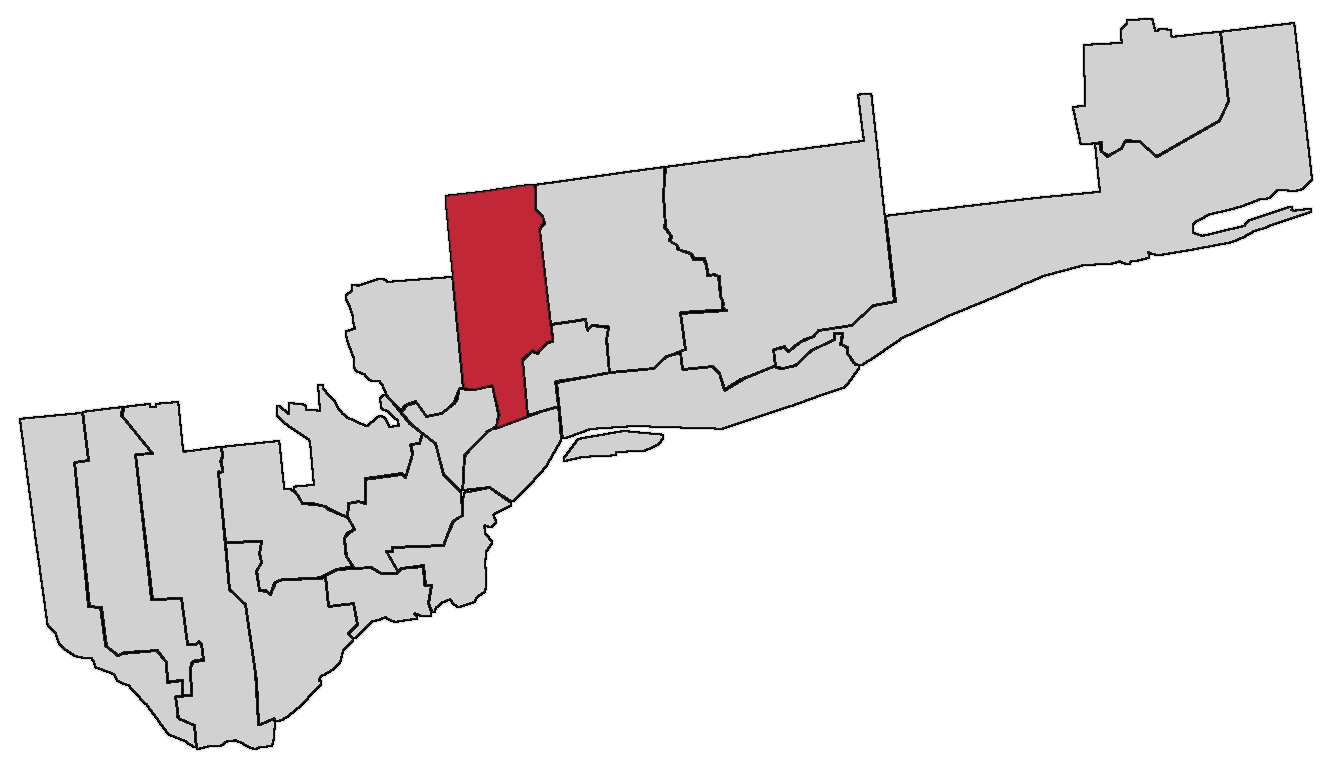
- Location of Carrefour-de-l'Hôpital District in Gatineau
- City: Gatineau
- Population: 9,499 (2019)
- Area: 21.06 km²

Current constituency
- Created: 2009
Councillor
Catherine Craig-St-Louis
Action Gatineau
- Sector(s): Gatineau
- Created from: Parts of: Promenades District; Versant District
- First contested: 2009 election
- Last contested: 2024 (by)

Carrefour-de-l'Hôpital District (District 13) (English: Crossroads of the Hospital) is a municipal electoral division in the city of Gatineau, Quebec. It is represented on Gatineau City Council by Catherine Craig-St-Louis of Action Gatineau.

The district is located in the Gatineau sector of the city. The district was created in 2009 from parts of Promenades District and Versant District. It consists of the neighbourhoods of Du Barry and Le Carrefour and the area around Parc Henri-Durant.

== Councillors ==
Council term	Party	Member
2009–2013	Independent	Patsy Bouthillette
2013–2017	Independent	Gilles Carpentier
2017–2021	Independent	Gilles Carpentier
2021–2024	Independent	Olive Kamanyana
2024–present	Action Gatineau	Catherine Craig-St-Louis

== Election results ==
=== 2024 by-election ===
A by-election was held on June 10, 2024 following the resignation of Olive Kamanyana who ran for mayor in the 2024 Gatineau mayoral by-election

Party	Candidate	Vote	%
Action Gatineau	Catherine Craig-St-Louis	1,516	41.76
Independent	Marie-Pier Lacroix	1,168	32.18
Independent	Kethlande Pierre	946	26.06

=== 2021 ===
Party	Candidate	Vote	%
Independent	Olive Kamanyana	1,923	52.43
Action Gatineau	Clément Bélanger	901	24.56
Independent	Frédérick Castonguay	506	13.79
Independent	Alexandre Bouchard	338	9.21

=== 2017 ===
Party	Candidate	Vote	%
Independent	Gilles Carpentier	2,569	65.92
Action Gatineau	Etienne Boulrice	1,328	34.08

=== 2013 ===
Party	Candidate	Vote	%
Independent	Gilles Carpentier	2,898	67.65
Action Gatineau	Nawel Benyelles	1,386	32.35

=== 2009 ===
Candidate	Vote	%
Patsy Bouthillette	Acclaimed	
