= Pointe-Gatineau District =

Municipal electoral division in Gatineau, Quebec, Canada

District 12 - Pointe-Gatineau
- Constituency for the Gatineau City Council
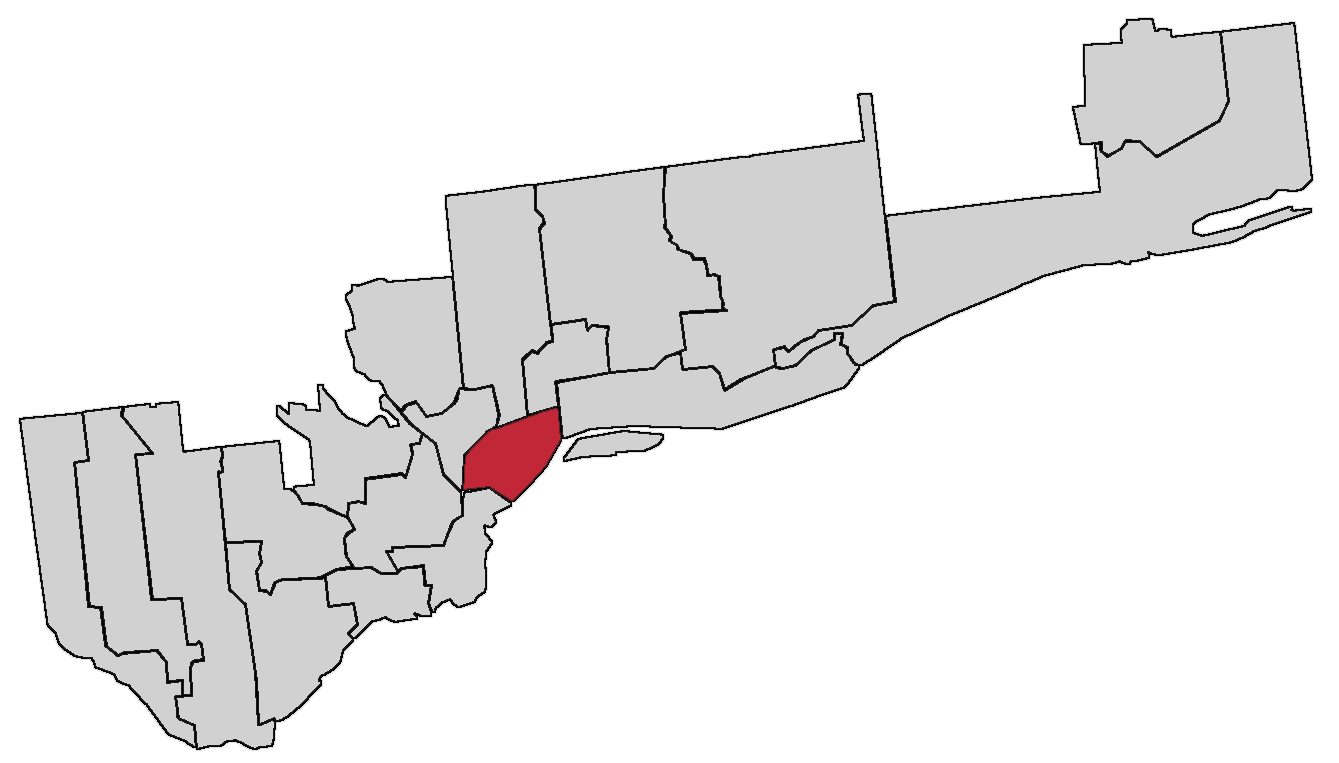
- Location of Pointe-Gatineau District in Gatineau
- City: Gatineau
- Population: 9,911 (2019)
- Area: 7.56 km²

Current constituency
- Created: 2000
Councillor
Marc Carrière
Independent
- Sector(s): Gatineau
- First contested: 2001 election
- Last contested: 2025 election

Pointe-Gatineau District (District 12) is a municipal electoral division in the city of Gatineau, Quebec. It is represented on Gatineau City Council by Marc Carrière. The district was known as Promenades District from 2002 to 2009; the name change was announced in 2011.

The district is located in the city's Gatineau sector. From 2001 to 2009 it included the neighbourhoods of Place Lucerne, Parc Maisonneuve, Val d'Oise and Le Barron.

During the 2009 election cycle, it gained La Baie while losing Val d'Oise and Le Barron.

During the 2013 election cycle, it gained the District des Riverains (Note: Not to be confused with the Riverains District, which was the name of the electoral division from 2002 to 2009 until it was changed to Touraine District.) neighbourhood while losing all the territory north of Highway 148.

== Councillors ==
Council term	Party	Member
Promenades District
2002–2005	Independent	Paul Morin
2005–2009	Independent	Luc Angers
Pointe-Gatineau District
2009–2013	Independent	Luc Angers
2009–2013	Action Gatineau	Luc Angers
2013–2017	Action Gatineau	Myriam Nadeau
2017–2021	Action Gatineau	Myriam Nadeau
2021–2025	Independent	Mike Duggan
2025	Équipe Mario Aubé	Marc Carrière
2025–present	Independent	Marc Carrière

== Election results ==
=== 2021 ===
2021 Gatineau municipal election: Pointe-Gatineau
Party	Candidate	Popular vote			Expenditures
Party	Candidate	Votes	%	±%	Expenditures
Independent	Mike Duggan	1,472	51.40	-1.75 (Note: Percentage change taken from Duggan's previous election win in Deschênes District.)	$4,246.65
Action Gatineau	Myriam Gilbert	1,134	39.59	-20.75	$4,667.51
Independent	Leon Kambi Bushiri	258	9.01	–	$2,032.99
Total valid votes		2,864	98.14		
Total rejected, unmarked and declined votes		54	1.86	-2.71	
Turnout		2,918	29.84	-2.23	
Eligible voters		9,780			
Note: Candidate campaign colours, unless a member of a party, may be based on the prominent colour used in campaign items (signs, literature, etc.) or colours used in polling graphs and are used as a visual differentiation between candidates.
Sources: Office of the City Clerk of Gatineau

=== 2017 ===
Party	Candidate	Vote	%
Action Gatineau	Myriam Nadeau	1,910	60.35
Independent	Michel St-Amour	1,255	39.65

=== 2013 ===
Party	Candidate	Vote	%
Action Gatineau	Myriam Nadeau	1,577	43.98
Independent	André François Choquette	837	23.34
Independent	Pierre Laurin	677	18.88
Independent	Patrick Pilon	495	13.80

=== 2009 ===
Candidate	Vote	%
Luc Angers	Acclaimed	

=== 2005 ===
Candidate	Votes	%
Luc Angers	2275	46.6
Paul Morin	1639	33.6
Pierre Willan	966	19.8

=== 2001 ===
2001 Gatineau municipal election: Promenades
Party	Candidate	Popular vote			Expenditures
Party	Candidate	Votes	%	±%	Expenditures
Independent	Paul Morin	Acclaimed	–	–	none listed
Total valid votes		–	–		
Total rejected, unmarked and declined votes		–	–	–	
Turnout		–	–	–	
Eligible voters		–			
Note: Candidate campaign colours, unless a member of a party, may be based on the prominent colour used in campaign items (signs, literature, etc.) or colours used in polling graphs and are used as a visual differentiation between candidates.
Sources: Office of the City Clerk of Gatineau
