= Limbour District =

Municipal electoral division in Gatineau, Quebec, Canada

District 10 - Limbour
- Constituency for the Gatineau City Council
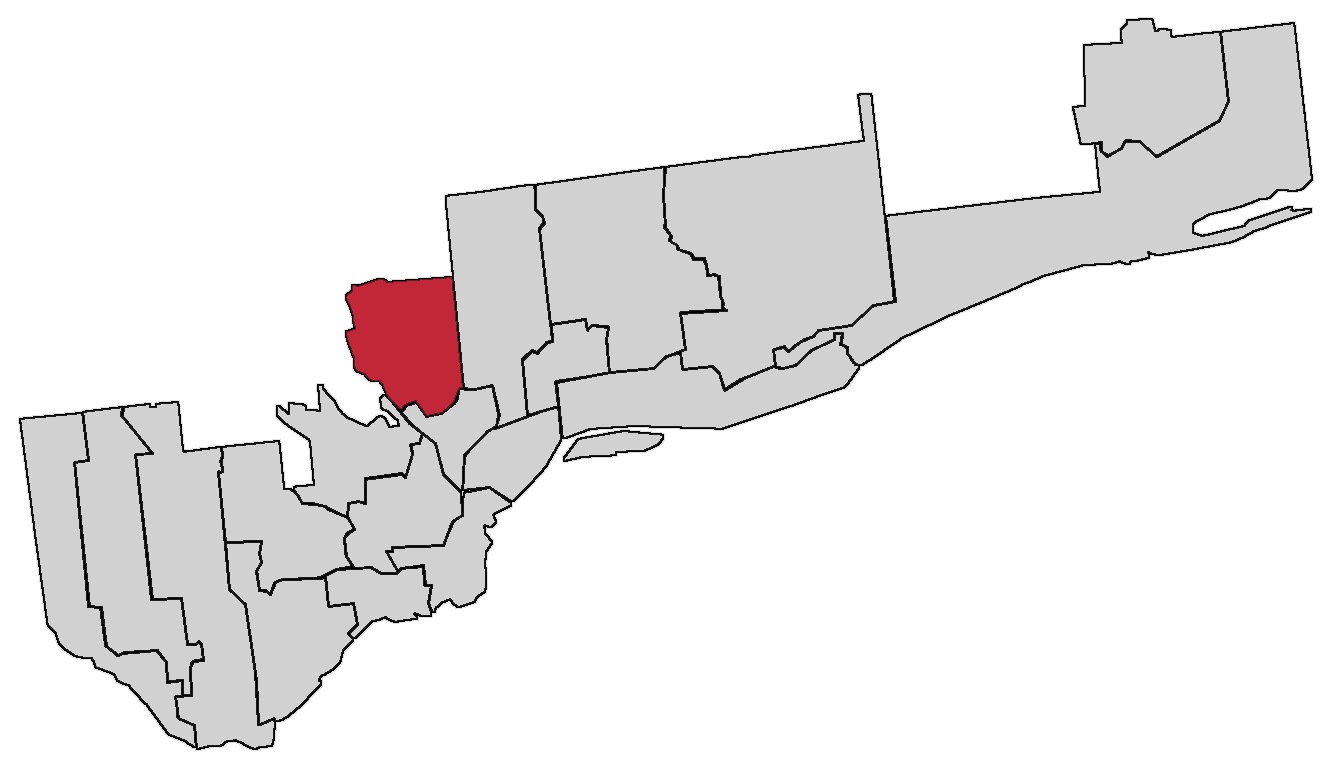
- Location of Limbour District in Gatineau
- City: Gatineau
- Population: 10,806 (2019)
- Area: 14.83 km²

Current constituency
- Created: 2000
Councillor
Julie Bélisle
Équipe Mario Aubé
- Sector(s): Gatineau
- First contested: 2001 election
- Last contested: 2025 election

Limbour District (District 10) is a municipal electoral division in the city of Gatineau, Quebec. It is currently represented on Gatineau City Council by Julie Bélisle of Équipe Mario Aubé.

The district is located in the Gatineau sector of the city. The district includes the neighbourhoods of Côte-d'Azur, Mont-Luc and Limbour.

== Councillors ==
Council term	Party	Member
2002–2005	Independent	Simon Racine
2005–2009	Independent	Simon Racine
2009–2013	Independent	Nicole Champagne
2013–2017	Independent	Cédric Tessier
2017–2021	Action Gatineau	Renée Amyot
2021–2025	Action Gatineau	Louis Sabourin
2025–present	Équipe Mario Aubé	Julie Bélisle

== Election results ==
=== 2021 ===
Party	Candidate	Vote	%
Action Gatineau	Louis Sabourin	2,102	41.88
Independent	Dérik Maltais	1,839	36.64
Independent	Nicole Champagne	1,078	21.48

=== 2017 ===
Party	Candidate	Vote	%
Action Gatineau	Renée Amyot	3,038	56.76
Independent	Paul Loyer	1,187	22.18
Independent	Denis Pageau	1,127	21.06

=== 2013 ===
Party	Candidate	Vote	%
Independent	Cédric Tessier	2,444	43.29
Action Gatineau	Wassim Aboutanos	1,689	29.92
Independent	Nicole Champagne (X)	1,512	26.78

=== 2009 ===
2009 Gatineau municipal election: Councillor, Ward Nine (Limbour)
Candidate	Votes	%
Nicole Champagne	1,497	28.76
Stéphane Gauthier	1,411	27.10
Jocelyn Dumais	1,403	26.95
Michel Ghantous	895	17.19
Total valid votes	5,206	100

=== 2005 ===
Candidate	Votes	%
Simon Racine	3392	64.0
Nicole Champagne	1909	36.0

=== 2001 ===
2001 Gatineau municipal election: Limbour
Party	Candidate	Popular vote			Expenditures
Party	Candidate	Votes	%	±%	Expenditures
Independent	Simon Racine	3,405	58.25	–	none listed
Independent	Jean-Guy Binet	1,468	25.12	–	none listed
Independent	Carol Carrière	972	16.63	–	none listed
Total valid votes		5,845	99.08		
Total rejected, unmarked and declined votes		54	0.92	–	
Turnout		5,899	62.37	–	
Eligible voters		9,458			
Note: Candidate campaign colours, unless a member of a party, may be based on the prominent colour used in campaign items (signs, literature, etc.) or colours used in polling graphs and are used as a visual differentiation between candidates.
Sources: Office of the City Clerk of Gatineau
