= Bellevue District =

Municipal electoral division in Gatineau, Quebec, Canada

District 14 - Bellevue
- Constituency for the Gatineau City Council
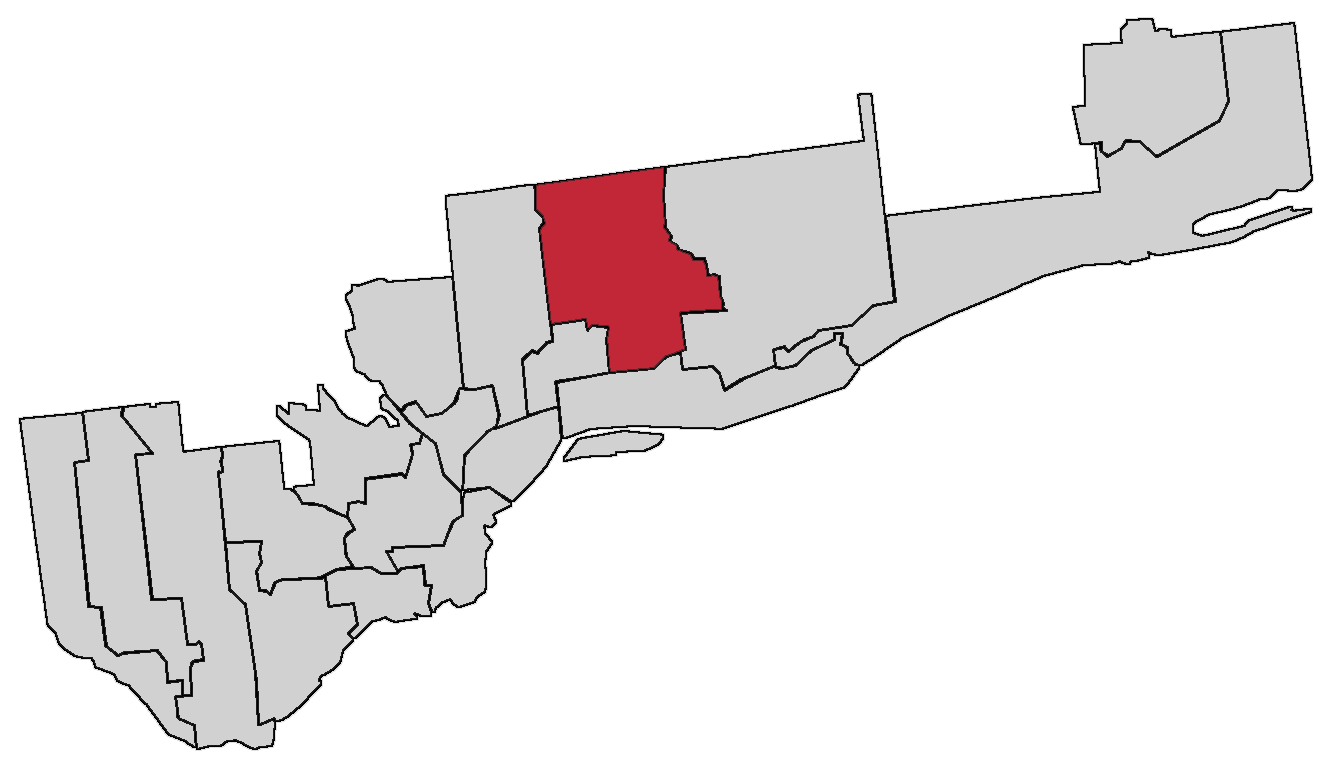
- Location of Bellevue District in Gatineau
- City: Gatineau
- Population: 11,496 (2019)
- Area: 28.25 km²

Current constituency
- Created: 2000
Councillor
Chloé Bourgeois
Équipe Mario Aubé
- Sector(s): Gatineau
- First contested: 2001 election
- Last contested: 2021 election

Bellevue District (District 15) is a municipal electoral division in the city of Gatineau, Quebec. It is represented on Gatineau City Council by Chloé Bourgeois of Équipe Mario Aubé.

The district is located in the Gatineau sector of the city and includes the newer developments in the north-central part of the sector as well as rural areas.

== Councillors ==
Council term	Party	Member
2002–2005	Independent	Richard Côté
2005–2009	Independent	Richard Côté
2009–2013	Independent	Sylvie Goneau
2013–2017	Independent	Sylvie Goneau
2017–2021	Independent	Pierre Lanthier
2021–2025	Action Gatineau	Alicia Lacasse-Brunet
2025–present	Équipe Mario Aubé	Chloé Bourgeois

== Election results ==
=== 2021 ===
Party	Candidate	Vote	%
Action Gatineau	Alicia Brunet-Lacasse	1,732	41.78
Independent	Paul Cloutier	883	21.30
Independent	Michel Payette	881	21.25
Independent	Serge Charette	650	15.68

=== 2017 ===
Party	Candidate	Vote	%
Independent	Pierre Lanthier	2,370	49.51
Action Gatineau	Romain Vanhooren	1,913	39.96
Independent	Jacques Perrier	504	10.53

=== 2013 ===
Party	Candidate	Vote	%
Independent	Sylvie Goneau (X)	2,928	66.14
Action Gatineau	Christian Violy	1,499	33.86

=== 2009 ===
2009 Gatineau municipal election: Councillor, District 14 (Bellevue)
Candidate	Votes	%
Sylvie Goneau	1,809	44.90
Mark Bordeleau	1,796	44.58
Serge Charette	424	10.52
Total valid votes	4,029	100

=== 2005 ===
Candidate	Votes	%
Richard Côté	Acclaimed	

=== 2001 ===
2001 Gatineau municipal election: Bellevue
Party	Candidate	Popular vote			Expenditures
Party	Candidate	Votes	%	±%	Expenditures
Independent	Richard Côté	4,778	69.37	–	none listed
Independent	Jean Deschênes	2,110	30.63	–	none listed
Total valid votes		6,888	98.91		
Total rejected, unmarked and declined votes		76	1.09	–	
Turnout		6,964	61.75	–	
Eligible voters		11,278			
Note: Candidate campaign colours, unless a member of a party, may be based on the prominent colour used in campaign items (signs, literature, etc.) or colours used in polling graphs and are used as a visual differentiation between candidates.
Sources: Office of the City Clerk of Gatineau
