= Lac-Beauchamp District =

Municipal electoral division in Gatineau, Quebec, Canada

Coordinates: 45.493°N 75.617°W

District 16 - Lac-Beauchamp
- Constituency for the Gatineau City Council
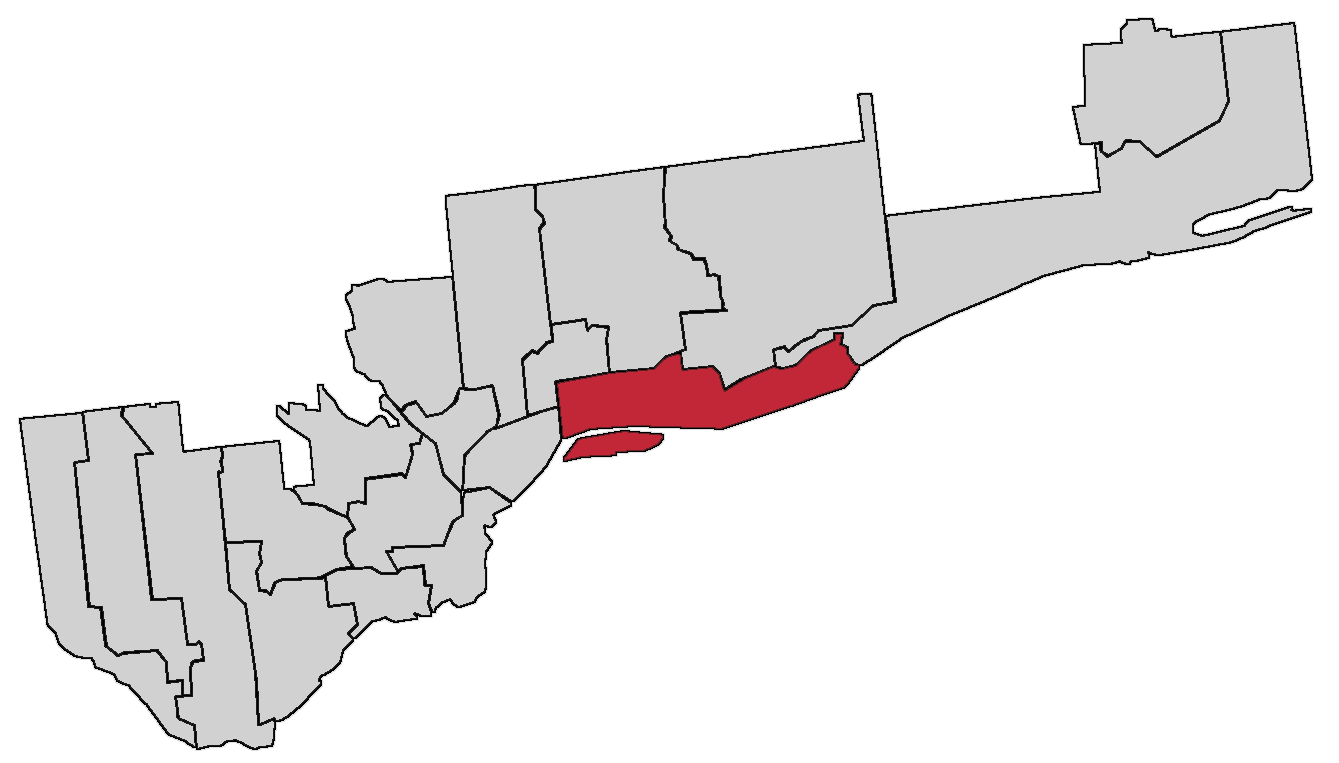
- Location of Lac-Beauchamp District in Gatineau
- City: Gatineau
- Population: 11,624 (2019)
- Area: 25.58 km²

Current constituency
- Created: 2000
Councillor
Timmy Jutras
Gatineau ensemble
- Sector(s): Gatineau
- First contested: 2001 election
- Last contested: 2025 election

Lac-Beauchamp District (District 16) is a municipal electoral division in Gatineau, Quebec represented on Gatineau City Council. It is currently represented by Timmy Jutra. The district is named after Lac Beauchamp, an artificial lake in this district.

The district contains the southern half of Old Gatineau, the historic downtown of the Gatineau sector of the city. It also contains a small section of Templeton.

== City councillors ==
| Council term | Party | Member |
|---|---|---|
| 2002–2005 | Independent | Aurèle Desjardins |
| 2005–2009 | Independent | Aurèle Desjardins |
| 2009–2013 | Independent | Stéphane Lauzon (Note: Resigned after being elected in the 2015 federal election.) |
| 2013–2017 | Independent | Stéphane Lauzon |
| 2013–2017 | Independent | Jean-François Leblanc |
| 2017–2021 | Independent | Jean-François Leblanc |
| 2021–2025 | Independent | Denis Girouard |
| 2025–present | Gatineau Ensemble | Timmy Jutras |

== Election results ==
=== 2021 ===
| Party | Candidate | Vote | % |
|---|---|---|---|
| Independent | Denis Girouard | 1,725 | 56.76 |
| Action Gatineau | Marie-Nicole Groulx | 1,314 | 43.24 |

=== 2017 ===
| Party | Candidate | Vote | % |
|---|---|---|---|
| Independent | Jean-François LeBlanc | 2,153 | 61.18 |
| Action Gatineau | Aurèle Desjardins | 1,366 | 38.82 |

=== February 28, 2016 by-election ===
| Party | Candidate | Vote | % |
|---|---|---|---|
| Independent | Jean-François Leblanc | 689 | 37.84 |
| Action Gatineau | Caroline Desrochers | 578 | 31.74 |
| Independent | Liza Lauzon | 447 | 24.55 |
| Independent | Gabriel Céré | 107 | 5.88 |

=== 2013 ===
| Party | Candidate | Vote | % |
|---|---|---|---|
| Independent | Stéphane Lauzon | 2,632 | 74.04 |
| Action Gatineau | Chakib Ahmimed | 923 | 25.96 |

=== 2009 ===
| Candidate | Vote | % |
|---|---|---|
| Stéphane Lauzon | 1,580 | 42.18 |
| Jacques Robert | 1,548 | 41.32 |
| Michel Choquette | 618 | 16.50 |

=== 2005 ===
| Candidate | Vote | % |
|---|---|---|
| Aurèle Desjardins | 2,221 | 43.6 |
| Jacques Robert | 1,833 | 36.0 |
| Pierre Durand | 1,037 | 20.4 |

=== 2001 ===
2001 Gatineau municipal election: Lac-Beauchamp
| Party | Candidate | Popular vote | | | Expenditures |
| Party | Candidate | Votes | % | ±% | Expenditures |
|---|---|---|---|---|---|
| Independent | Aurèle Desjardins | 3,352 | 54.48 | – | none listed |
| Independent | Pierre Durand | 1,764 | 28.67 | – | none listed |
| Independent | Richard Migneault | 1,037 | 16.85 | – | none listed |
| Total valid votes | | 6,153 | 98.26 | | |
| Total rejected, unmarked and declined votes | | 109 | 1.74 | – | |
| Turnout | | 6,262 | 56.37 | – | |
| Eligible voters | | 11,109 | | | |
Note: Candidate campaign colours, unless a member of a party, may be based on the prominent colour used in campaign items (signs, literature, etc.) or colours used in polling graphs and are used as a visual differentiation between candidates.
Sources: Office of the City Clerk of Gatineau
