= Versant District =

Municipal electoral division in Gatineau, Quebec, Canada

Coordinates: 45.49°N 75.69°W

District 14 - Versant
- Constituency for the Gatineau City Council
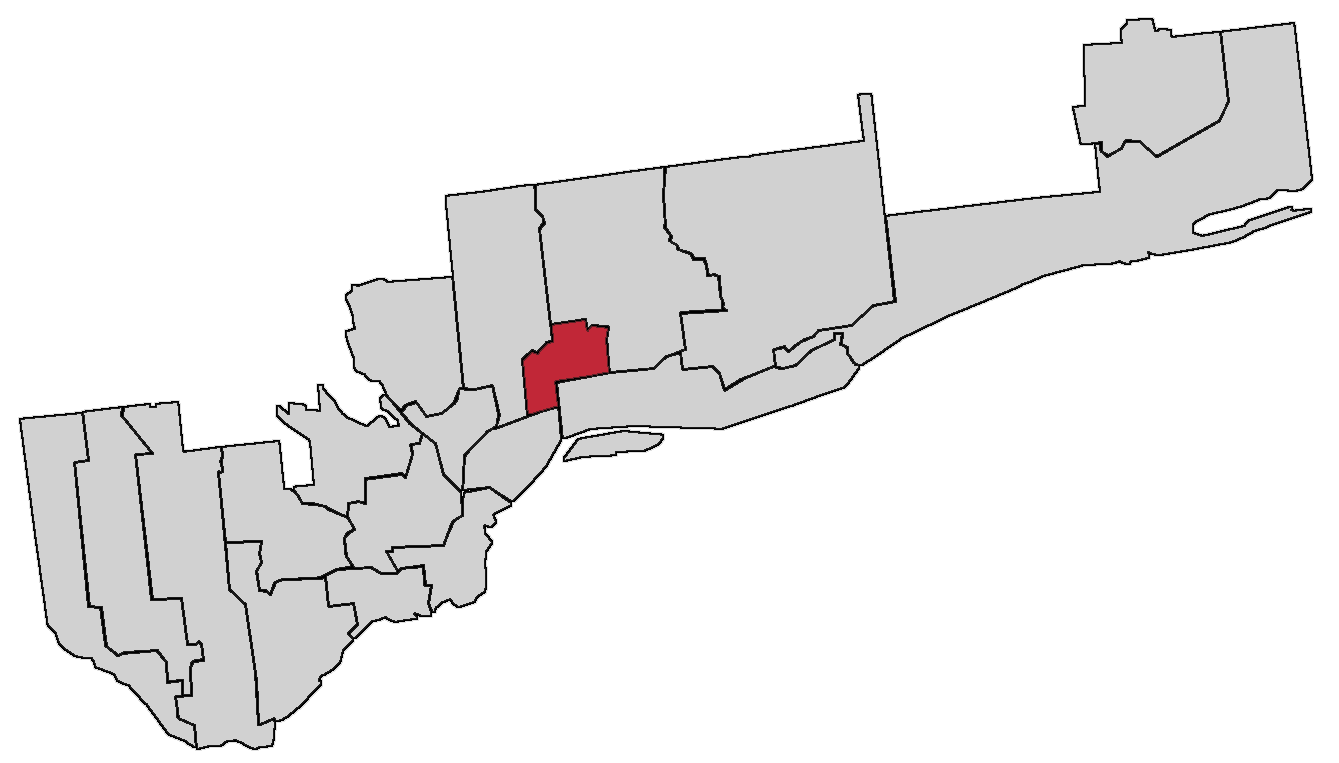
- Location of Versant District in Gatineau
- City: Gatineau
- Population: 10,212 (2019)
- Area: 5.63 km²

Current constituency
- Created: 2000
Councillor
Luc Chénier
Équipe Mario Aubé
- Sector(s): Gatineau
- First contested: 2001 election
- Last contested: 2025 election

Versant District (District 14) is a municipal district in the city of Gatineau, Quebec. It is represented on Gatineau City Council by Luc Chénier.

The district is located in the Gatineau sector of the city and includes the northern half of Old Gatineau and surrounding subdivisions.

== Councillors ==
Council term	Party	Member
2002–2005	Independent	Joseph De Sylva
2005–2009	Independent	Joseph De Sylva
2009–2013	Independent	Joseph De Sylva
2013–2017	Independent	Daniel Champagne
2017–2021	Independent	Daniel Champagne
2021–2025	Independent	Daniel Champagne
2025–present	Équipe Mario Aubé	Luc Chénier

== Election results ==
=== 2021 ===
Party	Candidate	Vote	%
Independent	Daniel Champagne	2,842	72.30
Action Gatineau	Luc Bégin	1,089	27.70

=== 2017 ===
Party	Candidate	Vote	%
Independent	Daniel Champagne	3,148	71.14
Action Gatineau	Luc Gelinas	1,277	28.86

=== 2013 ===
Party	Candidate	Vote	%
Independent	Daniel Champagne	2,607	57.35
Action Gatineau	Geneviève Ouimet	1,939	42.65

=== 2009 ===
Candidate	Vote	%
Joseph De Sylva	3,267	72.3
Frédérick Castonguay	1,250	27.7

=== 2005 ===
Candidate	Votes	%
Joseph De Sylva	Acclaimed	

=== 2001 ===
2001 Gatineau municipal election: Versant
Party	Candidate	Popular vote			Expenditures
Party	Candidate	Votes	%	±%	Expenditures
Independent	Joseph De Sylva	4,118	59.28	–	none listed
Independent	Jacques R. Forget	2,829	40.72	–	none listed
Total valid votes		6,947	98.48		
Total rejected, unmarked and declined votes		107	1.52	–	
Turnout		7,054	62.16	–	
Eligible voters		11,349			
Note: Candidate campaign colours, unless a member of a party, may be based on the prominent colour used in campaign items (signs, literature, etc.) or colours used in polling graphs and are used as a visual differentiation between candidates.
Sources: Office of the City Clerk of Gatineau
