= Rivière-Blanche District =

Municipal electoral division in Gatineau, Quebec, Canada

Coordinates: 45.513°N 75.585°W

District 17 - Rivière-Blanche
- Constituency for the Gatineau City Council
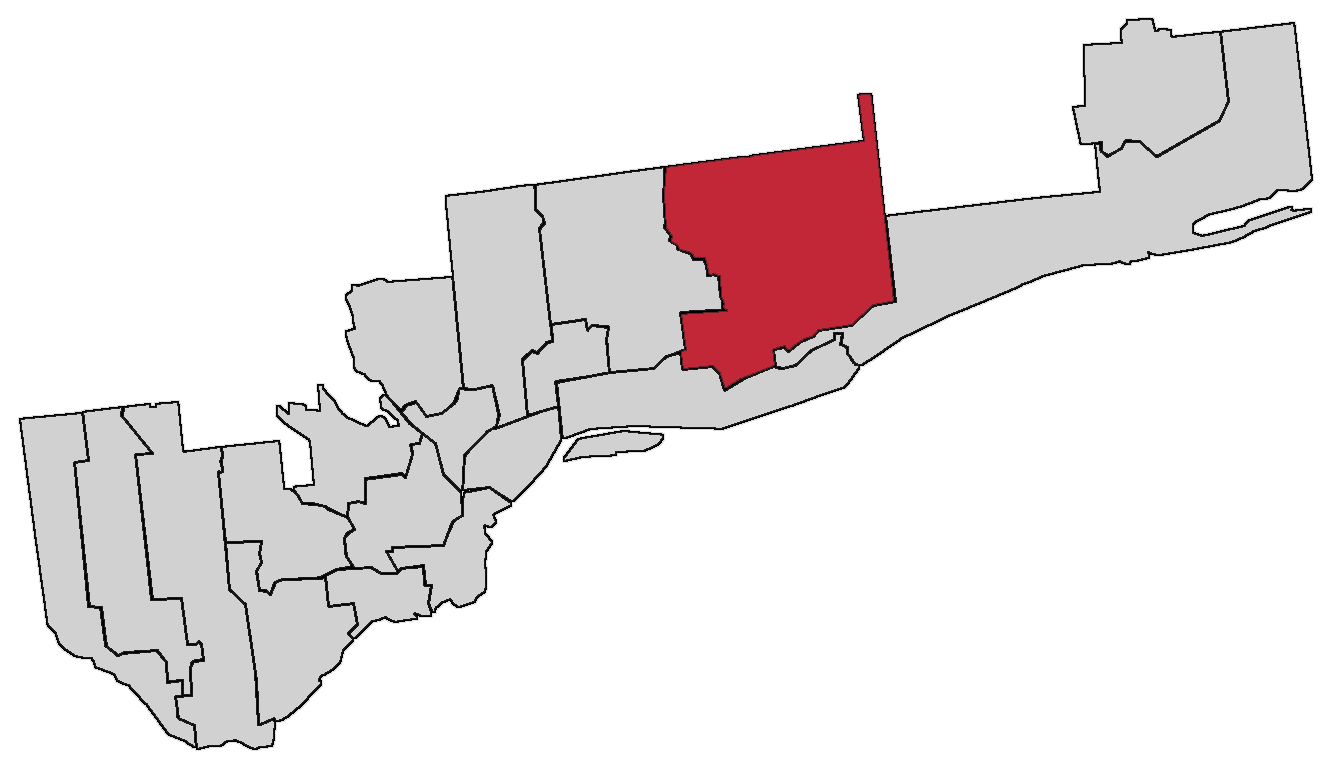
- Location of Rivière-Blanche District in Gatineau
- City: Gatineau
- Population: 11,600 (2019)
- Area: 46.26 km²

Current constituency
- Created: 2000
Councillor
Jean Lessard
Équipe Mario Aubé
- Sector(s): Gatineau
- First contested: 2001 election
- Last contested: 2021 election

Rivière-Blanche District (District 17) is a municipal electoral division in Gatineau, Quebec. It is represented by Jean Lessard on Gatineau City Council. The district is named after the Blanche River, which flows through it.

The district is centred on the historic Templeton Village in the east end of the city. The District also includes the neighbourhoods of Sainte-Rose, La Soblimière and much of Templeton-Est, including all of rural Templeton-Est north of Quebec Route 148 and east of the Blanche River.

== City councillors ==
Council term	Party	Member
2002–2005	Independent	Yvon Boucher
2005–2009	Independent	Yvon Boucher
2009–2013	Independent	Yvon Boucher
2013–2017	Independent	Jean Lessard
2017–2021	Independent	Jean Lessard
2021–2025	Independent	Jean Lessard
2021–2025	Équipe Mario Aubé	Jean Lessard

== Election results ==
=== 2021 ===
Party	Candidate	Vote	%
Independent	Jean Lessard	2,833	73.36
Action Gatineau	Tanya Desforges	1,029	26.64

=== 2017 ===
Party	Candidate	Vote	%
Independent	Jean Lessard	2,184	47.46
Action Gatineau	Nathalie Lepage	1,294	28.12
Independent	Eric Bourgeau	1,124	24.42

=== 2013 ===
Party	Candidate	Vote	%
Independent	Jean Lessard	1,296	29.20
Independent	Eric Bourgeau	1,295	29.17
Action Gatineau	Francine Parent-Stuart	1,278	28.78
Independent	Jason S. Noble	570	12.84

=== 2009 ===
Candidate	Vote	%
Yvon Boucher	3,396	76.4
Normand Dessureault	1,047	23.6

=== 2005 ===
Candidate	Vote	%
Yvon Boucher	3,943	65.9
Pierre Naud	2,083	34.1

=== 2001 ===
2001 Gatineau municipal election: Rivière-Blanche
Party	Candidate	Popular vote			Expenditures
Party	Candidate	Votes	%	±%	Expenditures
Independent	Yvon Boucher	3,215	50.03	–	none listed
Independent	Jean-Pierre Charrette	3,211	49.97	–	none listed
Total valid votes		6,426	98.48		
Total rejected, unmarked and declined votes		99	1.52	–	
Turnout		6,525	58.24	–	
Eligible voters		11,204			
Note: Candidate campaign colours, unless a member of a party, may be based on the prominent colour used in campaign items (signs, literature, etc.) or colours used in polling graphs and are used as a visual differentiation between candidates.
Sources: Office of the City Clerk of Gatineau
