= Masson-Angers District =

Municipal electoral division in Gatineau, Quebec, Canada

District 18 - Masson-Angers
- Constituency for the Gatineau City Council
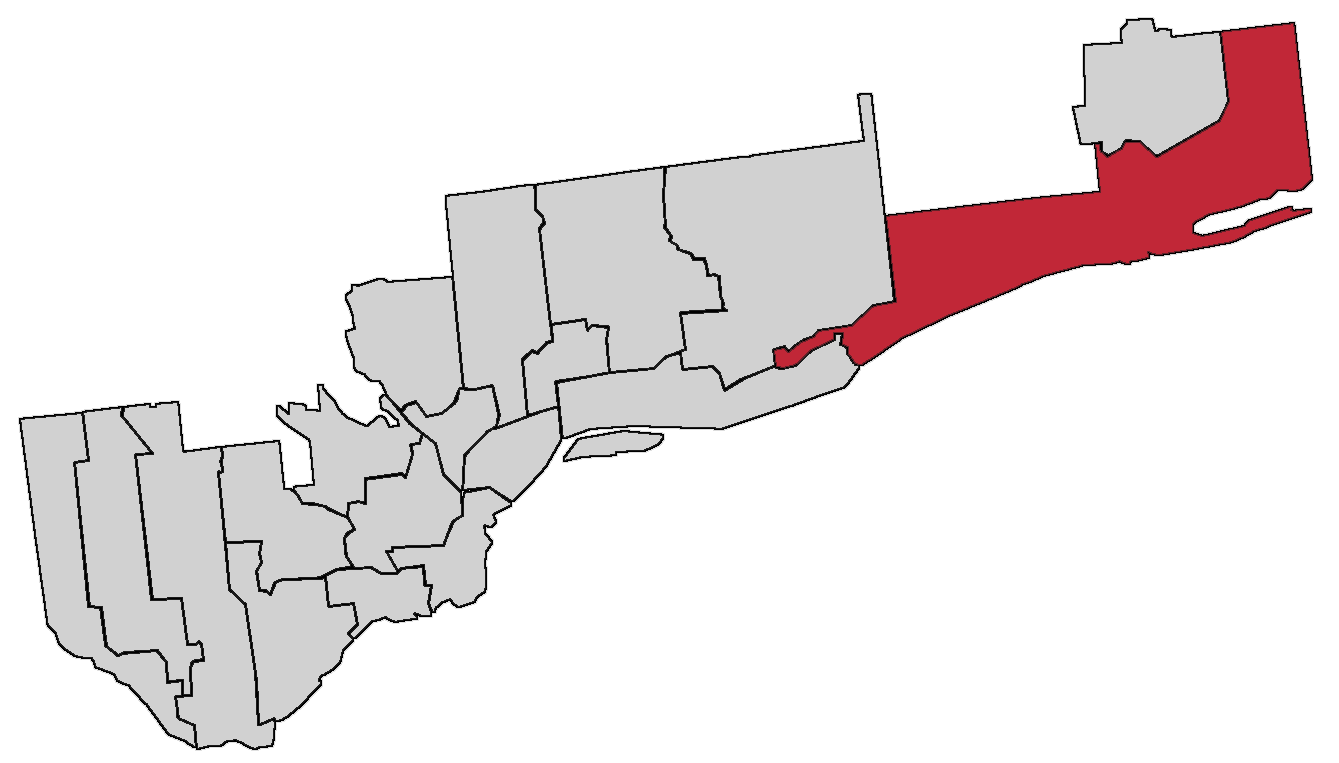
- Location of Masson-Angers District in Gatineau
- City: Gatineau
- Population: 11,204 (2019)
- Area: 66.59 km²

Current constituency
- Created: 2000
Councillor
Michael Korhonen
Michael Korhonen
- Sector(s): Masson-Angers
- First contested: 2001 election
- Last contested: 2021 election

Masson-Angers District (District 18) is a municipal district in the city of Gatineau, Quebec. It is represented on Gatineau City Council by Michael Korhonen.

The district is located in the Masson-Angers sector of the city, and is the sector's only district. The district includes the communities of Masson and Angers.

== Councillors ==
Council term	Party	Member
2002–2005	Independent	Luc Montreuil
2005–2009	Independent	Luc Montreuil
2009–2013	Independent	Luc Montreuil
2013–2017	Independent	Marc Carrière
2017–2021	Independent	Marc Carrière
2021–2025	Independent	Mario Aubé
2025	Équipe Mario Aubé	Mario Aubé
2025	Équipe Mario Aubé	Michael Korhonen
2025–present	Independent	Michael Korhonen

== Election results ==
=== 2021 ===
Party	Candidate	Vote	%
Independent	Mario Aubé	2,295	60.49
Independent	Sylvain Tremblay	626	16.50
Action Gatineau	Alain Bergeron	547	14.42
Independent	Martin Emond	326	8.59

=== 2017 ===
Party	Candidate	Vote	%
Independent	Marc Carrière	2,589	67.21
Action Gatineau	Alain Bergeron	901	23.39
Independent	Ghislain Larocque	362	9.40

=== 2013 ===
Party	Candidate	Vote	%
Independent	Marc Carrière	1,636	39.17
Action Gatineau	Roland Frenette, Jr.	1,326	31.75
Independent	Luc Montreuil (X)	1,215	29.09

=== 2009 ===
Candidate	Vote	%
Luc Montreuil	1,888	56.9
Serge Lefebvre	1,433	43.1

=== 2005 ===
Candidate	Votes	%
Luc Montreuil	1789	42.2
Margot Lajeunesse	1290	30.5
Michel Dambremont	1156	27.3

=== 2001 ===
2001 Gatineau municipal election: Masson-Angers
Party	Candidate	Popular vote			Expenditures
Party	Candidate	Votes	%	±%	Expenditures
Independent	Luc Montreuil	2,294	56.54	–	none listed
Independent	Michel Dambremont	934	23.03	–	none listed
Independent	Robert Guérin	829	20.43	–	none listed
Total valid votes		4,057	98.48		
Total rejected, unmarked and declined votes		39	1.52	–	
Turnout		4,096	58.24	–	
Eligible voters		6,783			
Note: Candidate campaign colours, unless a member of a party, may be based on the prominent colour used in campaign items (signs, literature, etc.) or colours used in polling graphs and are used as a visual differentiation between candidates.
Sources: Office of the City Clerk of Gatineau
