= 2001 Gatineau municipal election =

- Mayoral election
← 1999	November 4, 2001	2005 →
- Registered: 166,292
- Turnout: 53.76% (▲7.11pp)
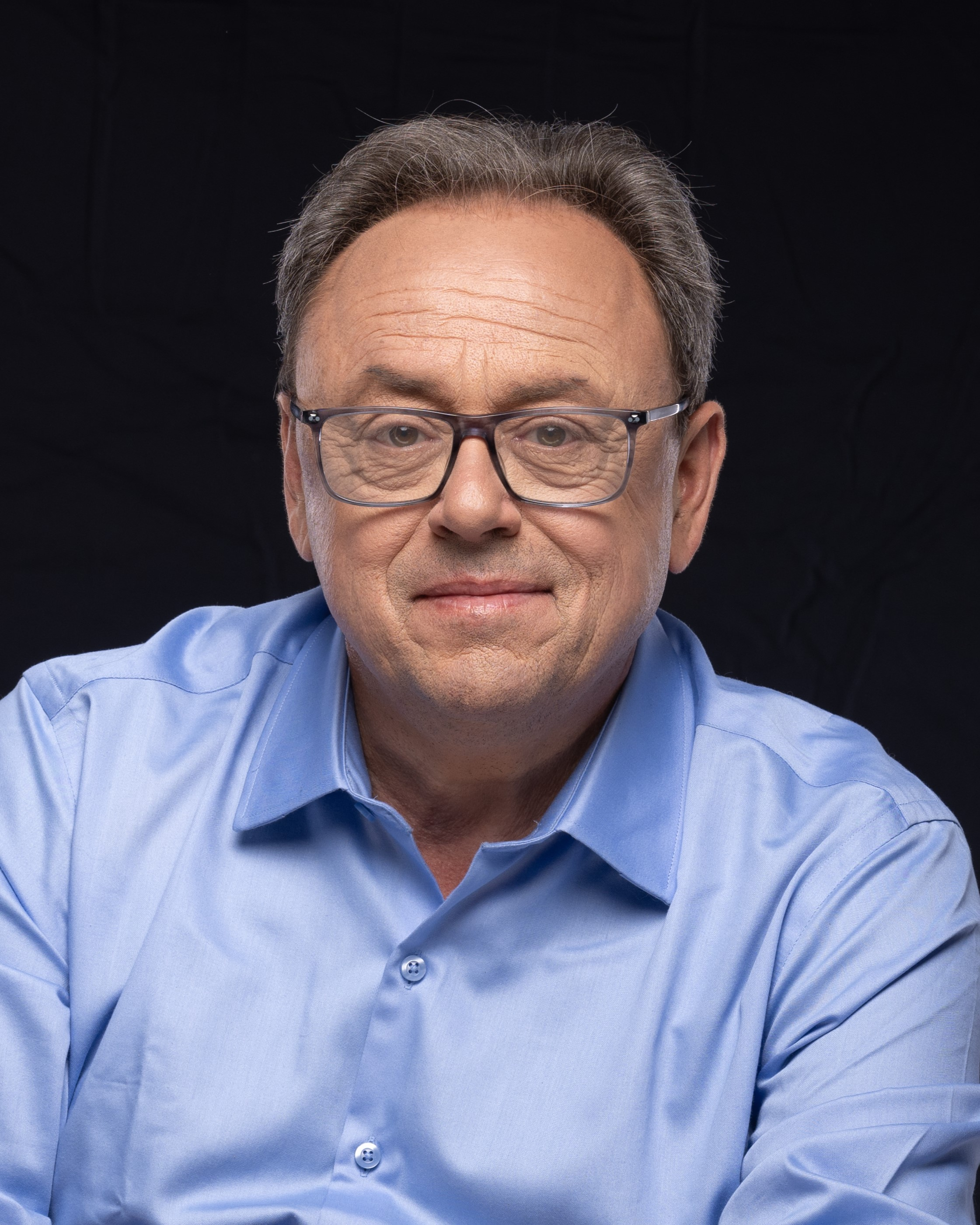

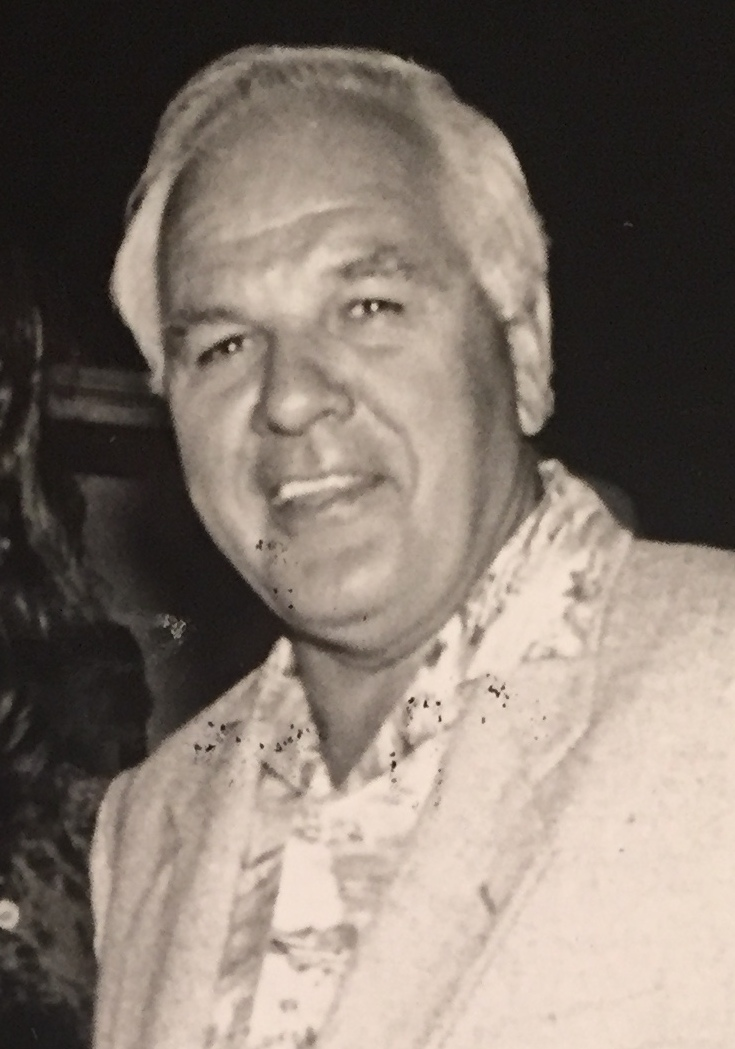
Nominee	Yves Ducharme	Robert Labine
Party	Independent	Independent
Popular vote	47,975	40,227
Percentage	54.39%	45.61%
Mayor before election
Robert Labine
Independent
Elected mayor
Yves Ducharme
Independent
- City Council election
← 1999	November 4, 2001	2005 →
- 17 seats in Gatineau City Council (Note: The Mayor is a member of City Council, but for the purposes of documentation is treated as their own individual.); 9 seats needed for a majority
- Turnout: 54.25%
Party	Leader	Vote %	Seats	+/–
Independent	–	100.00	17	+5
This lists parties that won seats. See the complete results below.

The 2001 Gatineau municipal election was held on Sunday, November 4, 2001, to elect a mayor and city councillors in Gatineau, Quebec, Canada. The election was held on the same day as the 2001 Quebec municipal elections.

== Mayoral race ==
2001 Gatineau municipal election: Mayor
Party	Candidate	Popular vote			Expenditures
Party	Candidate	Votes	%	±%	Expenditures
Independent	Yves Ducharme	47,975	54.39	–	none listed
Independent	Robert Labine	40,227	45.61	-2.71 (Note: The difference is taken from the result of the 1999 Gatineau mayoral election, which was before amalgamation.)	none listed
Total valid votes		88,202	98.65		
Total rejected, unmarked and declined votes		1,203	1.35	-0.07	
Turnout		89,405	53.76	+7.11	
Eligible voters		166,292			
Note: Candidate campaign colours, unless a member of a party, are based on the prominent colour used in campaign items (signs, literature, etc.) or colours used in polling graphs and are used as a visual differentiation between candidates.
Sources: Office of the City Clerk of Gatineau

== City Council ==
=== Aylmer District ===
2001 Gatineau municipal election: Aylmer
Party	Candidate	Popular vote			Expenditures
Party	Candidate	Votes	%	±%	Expenditures
Independent	André Levac	2,528	65.10	–	none listed
Independent	Louis Roy	1,355	34.90	–	none listed
Total valid votes		3,883	98.28		
Total rejected, unmarked and declined votes		68	1.72	–	
Turnout		3,951	42.78	–	
Eligible voters		9,236			
Note: Candidate campaign colours, unless a member of a party, may be based on the prominent colour used in campaign items (signs, literature, etc.) or colours used in polling graphs and are used as a visual differentiation between candidates.
Sources: Office of the City Clerk of Gatineau

=== Lucerne District ===
2001 Gatineau municipal election: Lucerne
Party	Candidate	Popular vote			Expenditures
Party	Candidate	Votes	%	±%	Expenditures
Independent	Alain Labonté	2,196	51.30	–	none listed
Independent	André Laframboise	2,082	48.70	–	none listed
Total valid votes		4,278	97.85		
Total rejected, unmarked and declined votes		68	2.15	–	
Turnout		4,372	49.61	–	
Eligible voters		8,812			
Note: Candidate campaign colours, unless a member of a party, may be based on the prominent colour used in campaign items (signs, literature, etc.) or colours used in polling graphs and are used as a visual differentiation between candidates.
Sources: Office of the City Clerk of Gatineau

=== Deschênes District ===
2001 Gatineau municipal election: Deschênes
Party	Candidate	Popular vote			Expenditures
Party	Candidate	Votes	%	±%	Expenditures
Independent	André Touchet	1,785	41.83	–	none listed
Independent	Richard Jennings	1,579	37.01	–	none listed
Independent	Suzanne Lloyd	903	21.16	–	none listed
Total valid votes		4,267	98.93		
Total rejected, unmarked and declined votes		46	1.07	–	
Turnout		4,313	48.54	–	
Eligible voters		8,885			
Note: Candidate campaign colours, unless a member of a party, may be based on the prominent colour used in campaign items (signs, literature, etc.) or colours used in polling graphs and are used as a visual differentiation between candidates.
Sources: Office of the City Clerk of Gatineau

=== Val-Tétreau District ===
2001 Gatineau municipal election: Val-Tétreau
Party	Candidate	Popular vote			Expenditures
Party	Candidate	Votes	%	±%	Expenditures
Independent	Lawrence Cannon	2,999	56.70	–	none listed
Independent	Claude Millette	2,291	43.30	–	none listed
Total valid votes		5,290	98.24		
Total rejected, unmarked and declined votes		95	1.76	–	
Turnout		5,385	54.78	–	
Eligible voters		9,830			
Note: Candidate campaign colours, unless a member of a party, may be based on the prominent colour used in campaign items (signs, literature, etc.) or colours used in polling graphs and are used as a visual differentiation between candidates.
Sources: Office of the City Clerk of Gatineau

=== Wright–Parc-de-la-Montagne District ===
2001 Gatineau municipal election: Wright–Parc-de-la-Montagne
Party	Candidate	Popular vote			Expenditures
Party	Candidate	Votes	%	±%	Expenditures
Independent	Marc Bureau	4,288	81.96	–	none listed
Independent	Hubert A. Leroux	944	18.04	–	none listed
Total valid votes		5,232	97.39		
Total rejected, unmarked and declined votes		140	2.61	–	
Turnout		5,372	54.33	–	
Eligible voters		9,887			
Note: Candidate campaign colours, unless a member of a party, may be based on the prominent colour used in campaign items (signs, literature, etc.) or colours used in polling graphs and are used as a visual differentiation between candidates.
Sources: Office of the City Clerk of Gatineau

=== Orée-du-Parc District ===
2001 Gatineau municipal election: Orée-du-Parc
Party	Candidate	Popular vote			Expenditures
Party	Candidate	Votes	%	±%	Expenditures
Independent	Louise Poirier	Acclaimed	–	–	none listed
Total valid votes		–	–		
Total rejected, unmarked and declined votes		–	–	–	
Turnout		–	–	–	
Eligible voters		–			
Note: Candidate campaign colours, unless a member of a party, may be based on the prominent colour used in campaign items (signs, literature, etc.) or colours used in polling graphs and are used as a visual differentiation between candidates.
Sources: Office of the City Clerk of Gatineau

=== Saint-Raymond–Vanier District ===
2001 Gatineau municipal election: Saint-Raymond–Vanier
Party	Candidate	Popular vote			Expenditures
Party	Candidate	Votes	%	±%	Expenditures
Independent	Pierre Philion	3,004	69.60	–	none listed
Independent	Paul-Émile Paquette	1,312	30.40	–	none listed
Total valid votes		4,316	96.25		
Total rejected, unmarked and declined votes		168	3.75	–	
Turnout		4,484	47.57	–	
Eligible voters		9,427			
Note: Candidate campaign colours, unless a member of a party, may be based on the prominent colour used in campaign items (signs, literature, etc.) or colours used in polling graphs and are used as a visual differentiation between candidates.
Sources: Office of the City Clerk of Gatineau

=== Hull District ===
2001 Gatineau municipal election: Hull
Party	Candidate	Popular vote			Expenditures
Party	Candidate	Votes	%	±%	Expenditures
Independent	Denise Laferrière	1,547	39.39	–	none listed
Independent	Jocelyn Blondin	1,535	39.09	–	none listed
Independent	José Rego	690	17.57	–	none listed
Independent	Richard Laramée	155	3.95	–	none listed
Total valid votes		3,927	97.30		
Total rejected, unmarked and declined votes		109	2.70	–	
Turnout		4,036	42.95	–	
Eligible voters		9,398			
Note: Candidate campaign colours, unless a member of a party, may be based on the prominent colour used in campaign items (signs, literature, etc.) or colours used in polling graphs and are used as a visual differentiation between candidates.
Sources: Office of the City Clerk of Gatineau

=== Limbour District ===
2001 Gatineau municipal election: Limbour
Party	Candidate	Popular vote			Expenditures
Party	Candidate	Votes	%	±%	Expenditures
Independent	Simon Racine	3,405	58.25	–	none listed
Independent	Jean-Guy Binet	1,468	25.12	–	none listed
Independent	Carol Carrière	972	16.63	–	none listed
Total valid votes		5,845	99.08		
Total rejected, unmarked and declined votes		54	0.92	–	
Turnout		5,899	62.37	–	
Eligible voters		9,458			
Note: Candidate campaign colours, unless a member of a party, may be based on the prominent colour used in campaign items (signs, literature, etc.) or colours used in polling graphs and are used as a visual differentiation between candidates.
Sources: Office of the City Clerk of Gatineau

=== Riverains District ===
2001 Gatineau municipal election: Riverains
Party	Candidate	Popular vote			Expenditures
Party	Candidate	Votes	%	±%	Expenditures
Independent	Thérèse Cyr	Acclaimed	–	–	none listed
Total valid votes		–	–		
Total rejected, unmarked and declined votes		–	–	–	
Turnout		–	–	–	
Eligible voters		–			
Note: Candidate campaign colours, unless a member of a party, may be based on the prominent colour used in campaign items (signs, literature, etc.) or colours used in polling graphs and are used as a visual differentiation between candidates.
Sources: Office of the City Clerk of Gatineau

=== Promenades District ===
2001 Gatineau municipal election: Promenades
Party	Candidate	Popular vote			Expenditures
Party	Candidate	Votes	%	±%	Expenditures
Independent	Paul Morin	Acclaimed	–	–	none listed
Total valid votes		–	–		
Total rejected, unmarked and declined votes		–	–	–	
Turnout		–	–	–	
Eligible voters		–			
Note: Candidate campaign colours, unless a member of a party, may be based on the prominent colour used in campaign items (signs, literature, etc.) or colours used in polling graphs and are used as a visual differentiation between candidates.
Sources: Office of the City Clerk of Gatineau

=== Versant District ===
2001 Gatineau municipal election: Versant
Party	Candidate	Popular vote			Expenditures
Party	Candidate	Votes	%	±%	Expenditures
Independent	Joseph De Sylva	4,118	59.28	–	none listed
Independent	Jacques R. Forget	2,829	40.72	–	none listed
Total valid votes		6,947	98.48		
Total rejected, unmarked and declined votes		107	1.52	–	
Turnout		7,054	62.16	–	
Eligible voters		11,349			
Note: Candidate campaign colours, unless a member of a party, may be based on the prominent colour used in campaign items (signs, literature, etc.) or colours used in polling graphs and are used as a visual differentiation between candidates.
Sources: Office of the City Clerk of Gatineau

=== Bellevue District ===
2001 Gatineau municipal election: Bellevue
Party	Candidate	Popular vote			Expenditures
Party	Candidate	Votes	%	±%	Expenditures
Independent	Richard Côté	4,778	69.37	–	none listed
Independent	Jean Deschênes	2,110	30.63	–	none listed
Total valid votes		6,888	98.91		
Total rejected, unmarked and declined votes		76	1.09	–	
Turnout		6,964	61.75	–	
Eligible voters		11,278			
Note: Candidate campaign colours, unless a member of a party, may be based on the prominent colour used in campaign items (signs, literature, etc.) or colours used in polling graphs and are used as a visual differentiation between candidates.
Sources: Office of the City Clerk of Gatineau

=== Lac-Beauchamp District ===
2001 Gatineau municipal election: Lac-Beauchamp
Party	Candidate	Popular vote			Expenditures
Party	Candidate	Votes	%	±%	Expenditures
Independent	Aurèle Desjardins	3,352	54.48	–	none listed
Independent	Pierre Durand	1,764	28.67	–	none listed
Independent	Richard Migneault	1,037	16.85	–	none listed
Total valid votes		6,153	98.26		
Total rejected, unmarked and declined votes		109	1.74	–	
Turnout		6,262	56.37	–	
Eligible voters		11,109			
Note: Candidate campaign colours, unless a member of a party, may be based on the prominent colour used in campaign items (signs, literature, etc.) or colours used in polling graphs and are used as a visual differentiation between candidates.
Sources: Office of the City Clerk of Gatineau

=== Rivière-Blanche District ===
2001 Gatineau municipal election: Rivière-Blanche
Party	Candidate	Popular vote			Expenditures
Party	Candidate	Votes	%	±%	Expenditures
Independent	Yvon Boucher	3,215	50.03	–	none listed
Independent	Jean-Pierre Charrette	3,211	49.97	–	none listed
Total valid votes		6,426	98.48		
Total rejected, unmarked and declined votes		99	1.52	–	
Turnout		6,525	58.24	–	
Eligible voters		11,204			
Note: Candidate campaign colours, unless a member of a party, may be based on the prominent colour used in campaign items (signs, literature, etc.) or colours used in polling graphs and are used as a visual differentiation between candidates.
Sources: Office of the City Clerk of Gatineau

=== Masson-Angers District ===
2001 Gatineau municipal election: Masson-Angers
Party	Candidate	Popular vote			Expenditures
Party	Candidate	Votes	%	±%	Expenditures
Independent	Luc Montreuil	2,294	56.54	–	none listed
Independent	Michel Dambremont	934	23.03	–	none listed
Independent	Robert Guérin	829	20.43	–	none listed
Total valid votes		4,057	98.48		
Total rejected, unmarked and declined votes		39	1.52	–	
Turnout		4,096	58.24	–	
Eligible voters		6,783			
Note: Candidate campaign colours, unless a member of a party, may be based on the prominent colour used in campaign items (signs, literature, etc.) or colours used in polling graphs and are used as a visual differentiation between candidates.
Sources: Office of the City Clerk of Gatineau

=== Buckingham District ===
2001 Gatineau municipal election: Buckingham
Party	Candidate	Popular vote			Expenditures
Party	Candidate	Votes	%	±%	Expenditures
Independent	Jocelyne Houle	Acclaimed	–	–	none listed
Total valid votes		–	–		
Total rejected, unmarked and declined votes		–	–	–	
Turnout		–	–	–	
Eligible voters		–			
Note: Candidate campaign colours, unless a member of a party, may be based on the prominent colour used in campaign items (signs, literature, etc.) or colours used in polling graphs and are used as a visual differentiation between candidates.
Sources: Office of the City Clerk of Gatineau
