= Aylmer District =

Municipal electoral division in Gatineau, Quebec, Canada

Coordinates: 45.40°N 75.83°W

District 1 - Aylmer
- Constituency for the Gatineau City Council
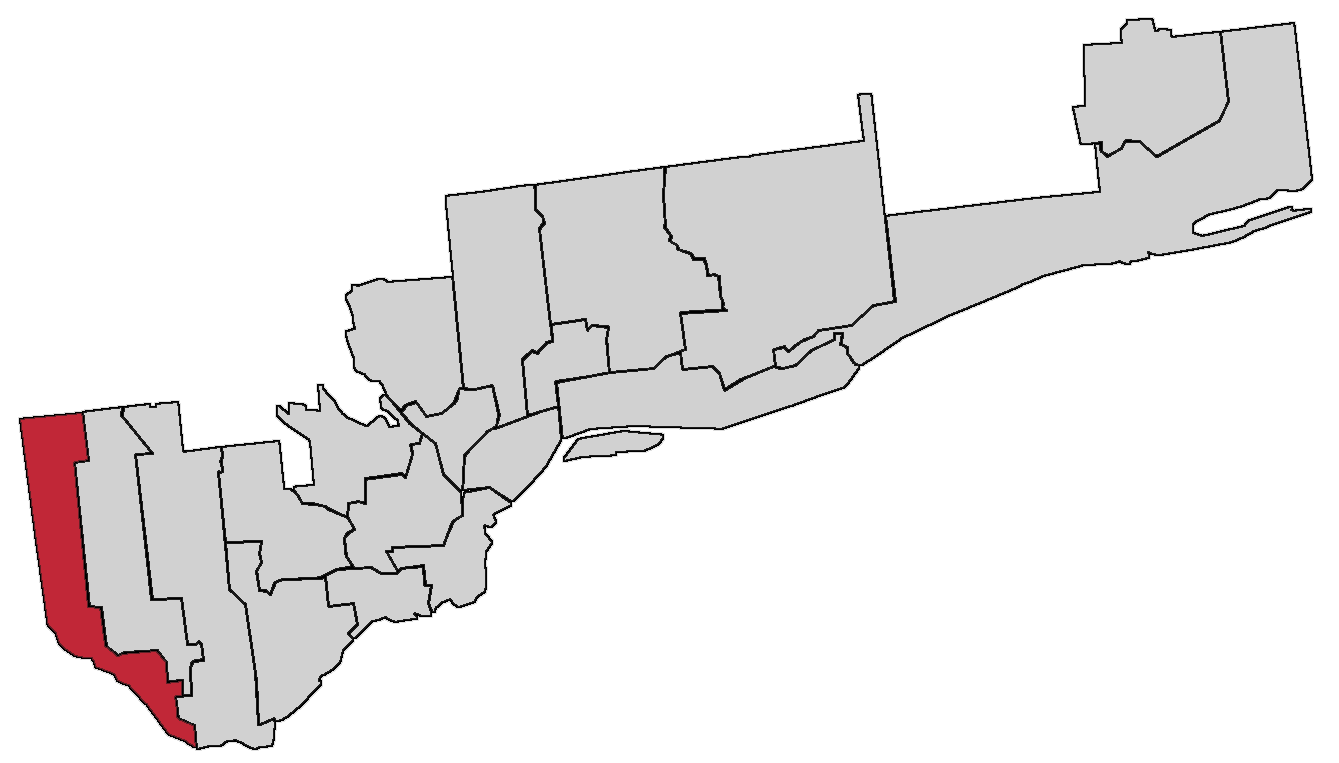
- Location of Aylmer District in Gatineau
- City: Gatineau
- Population: 10,771 (2019)
- Area: 24.96 km²

Current constituency
- Created: 2000
Councillor
Vincent Roy
Action Gatineau
- Sector(s): Aylmer
- First contested: 2001 election
- Last contested: 2025 election

Aylmer District (District 1) is a municipal electoral division in the city of Gatineau, Quebec. It is represented on Gatineau City Council by Vincent Roy.

The district is located in the Aylmer sector of the city. It is one five districts in the sector. The district includes the neighbourhoods of Wychwood, Parc-Aylmer, Downtown Aylmer, Les Cêdres and McLeod.

For the 2009 election, it gained the neighbourhood of Queen's Park and some of the downtown.

== Councillors ==
Council term	Member	Party
2002–2005	André Levac	Independent
2005–2009	Frank Thérien	Independent
2009–2013	Stefan Psenak	Independent
2009–2013	Stefan Psenak	Action Gatineau
2013–2017	Josée Lacasse	Independent
2017–2021	Audrey Bureau	Independent
2021–2025	Steven Boivin	Independent
2025–present	Vincent Roy	Action Gatineau

== Election results ==
=== 2021 ===
2021 Gatineau municipal election: Aylmer
Party	Candidate	Popular vote			Expenditures
Party	Candidate	Votes	%	±%	Expenditures
Independent	Steven Boivin	1,775	56.69	–	$4,970.80
Action Gatineau	Julie Cool	1,356	43.31	+23.77	none listed
Total valid votes		3,131	98.46		
Total rejected, unmarked and declined votes		49	1.54	+0.52	
Turnout		3,180	30.09	-6.51	
Eligible voters		10,570			
Note: Candidate campaign colours, unless a member of a party, may be based on the prominent colour used in campaign items (signs, literature, etc.) or colours used in polling graphs and are used as a visual differentiation between candidates.
Sources: Office of the City Clerk of Gatineau and Élections Québec

=== 2017 ===
2017 Gatineau municipal election: Aylmer
Party	Candidate	Popular vote			Expenditures
Party	Candidate	Votes	%	±%	Expenditures
Independent	Audrey Bureau	3,271	76.55	–	$3,932.38
Action Gatineau	François Sylvestre	835	19.54	-27.02	none listed
Independent	David Inglis	167	3.91	–	$0.00
Total valid votes		4,273	98.98		
Total rejected, unmarked and declined votes		44	1.02	+0.12	
Turnout		4,317	36.60	-2.42	
Eligible voters		11,917			
Note: Candidate campaign colours, unless a member of a party, may be based on the prominent colour used in campaign items (signs, literature, etc.) or colours used in polling graphs and are used as a visual differentiation between candidates.
Sources: Office of the City Clerk of Gatineau and Élections Québec

=== 2013 ===
2013 Gatineau municipal election: Aylmer
Party	Candidate	Popular vote			Expenditures
Party	Candidate	Votes	%	±%	Expenditures
Independent	Josée Lacasse	2,485	53.44	–	$4,942.40
Action Gatineau	Stefan Psenak	2,165	46.56	-3.47	none listed
Total valid votes		4,650	99.10		
Total rejected, unmarked and declined votes		42	0.90	-0.51	
Turnout		4,692	39.02	+3.48	
Eligible voters		11,917			
Note: Candidate campaign colours, unless a member of a party, may be based on the prominent colour used in campaign items (signs, literature, etc.) or colours used in polling graphs and are used as a visual differentiation between candidates.
Sources: Office of the City Clerk of Gatineau and Élections Québec

=== 2009 ===
2009 Gatineau municipal election: Aylmer
Party	Candidate	Popular vote			Expenditures
Party	Candidate	Votes	%	±%	Expenditures
Independent	Stefan Psenak	1,789	50.03	–	none listed
Independent	Frank Thérien	1,788	49.97	-5.95	none listed
Total valid votes		3,576	98.59		
Total rejected, unmarked and declined votes		51	1.41	-0.20	
Turnout		3,627	35.54	-5.62	
Eligible voters		10,205			
Note: Candidate campaign colours, unless a member of a party, may be based on the prominent colour used in campaign items (signs, literature, etc.) or colours used in polling graphs and are used as a visual differentiation between candidates.
Sources: Office of the City Clerk of Gatineau

=== 2005 ===
2005 Gatineau municipal election: Aylmer
Party	Candidate	Popular vote			Expenditures
Party	Candidate	Votes	%	±%	Expenditures
Independent	Frank Thérien	2,056	55.92	–	none listed
Independent	André Levac	1,621	44.08	-21.02	none listed
Total valid votes		3,677	98.39		
Total rejected, unmarked and declined votes		60	1.61	-0.12	
Turnout		3,737	41.16	-1.62	
Eligible voters		9,080			
Note: Candidate campaign colours, unless a member of a party, may be based on the prominent colour used in campaign items (signs, literature, etc.) or colours used in polling graphs and are used as a visual differentiation between candidates.
Sources: Office of the City Clerk of Gatineau

=== 2001 ===
2001 Gatineau municipal election: Aylmer
Party	Candidate	Popular vote			Expenditures
Party	Candidate	Votes	%	±%	Expenditures
Independent	André Levac	2,528	65.10	–	none listed
Independent	Louis Roy	1,355	34.90	–	none listed
Total valid votes		3,883	98.28		
Total rejected, unmarked and declined votes		68	1.72	–	
Turnout		3,951	42.78	–	
Eligible voters		9,236			
Note: Candidate campaign colours, unless a member of a party, may be based on the prominent colour used in campaign items (signs, literature, etc.) or colours used in polling graphs and are used as a visual differentiation between candidates.
Sources: Office of the City Clerk of Gatineau
