= Val-Tétreau District =

Municipal electoral division in Gatineau, Quebec, Canada

Coordinates: 45.43°N 75.76°W

District 4 - Val-Tétreau
- Former constituency for the Gatineau City Council
- City: Gatineau

Former constituency
- Created: 2000
- Abolished: 2009
- Sector(s): Hull
- First contested: 2001 election
- Last contested: 2005 election

Val-Tétreau District (District 4) was a municipal electoral division in the city of Gatineau, Quebec.

The district was located in the Hull sector of the city. The district included the neighbourhoods of Val-Tétreau, Jardins-Alexandre-Taché, Manoir des Trembles, Jardins Mackenzie-King and Plateau.

The district was abolished in 2009, dividing up into Deschênes District, Plateau–Manoir-des-Trembles District and Hull–Val-Tétreau District.

== Councillors ==
Council term	Party	Member
2002–2005	Independent	Lawrence Cannon
2005–2009	Independent	Alain Pilon
District dissolved

== Election results ==
=== 2005 ===
2005 Gatineau municipal election: Val-Tétreau
Party	Candidate	Popular vote			Expenditures
Party	Candidate	Votes	%	±%	Expenditures
Independent	Alain Pilon	2,970	50.30	–	none listed
Independent	Jean-François LaRue	2,929	49.70	–	none listed
Total valid votes		5,899	98.27		
Total rejected, unmarked and declined votes		104	1.73	-0.03	
Turnout		6,003	53.55	-1.23	
Eligible voters		11,210			
Note: Candidate campaign colours, unless a member of a party, may be based on the prominent colour used in campaign items (signs, literature, etc.) or colours used in polling graphs and are used as a visual differentiation between candidates.
Sources: Office of the City Clerk of Gatineau

=== 2001 ===
2001 Gatineau municipal election: Val-Tétreau
Party	Candidate	Popular vote			Expenditures
Party	Candidate	Votes	%	±%	Expenditures
Independent	Lawrence Cannon	2,999	56.70	–	none listed
Independent	Claude Millette	2,291	43.30	–	none listed
Total valid votes		5,290	98.24		
Total rejected, unmarked and declined votes		95	1.76	–	
Turnout		5,385	54.78	–	
Eligible voters		9,830			
Note: Candidate campaign colours, unless a member of a party, may be based on the prominent colour used in campaign items (signs, literature, etc.) or colours used in polling graphs and are used as a visual differentiation between candidates.
Sources: Office of the City Clerk of Gatineau
