= Touraine District =

Municipal electoral division in Gatineau, Quebec, Canada

Coordinates: 45.48°N 75.72°W

District 11 - Touraine
- Constituency for the Gatineau City Council
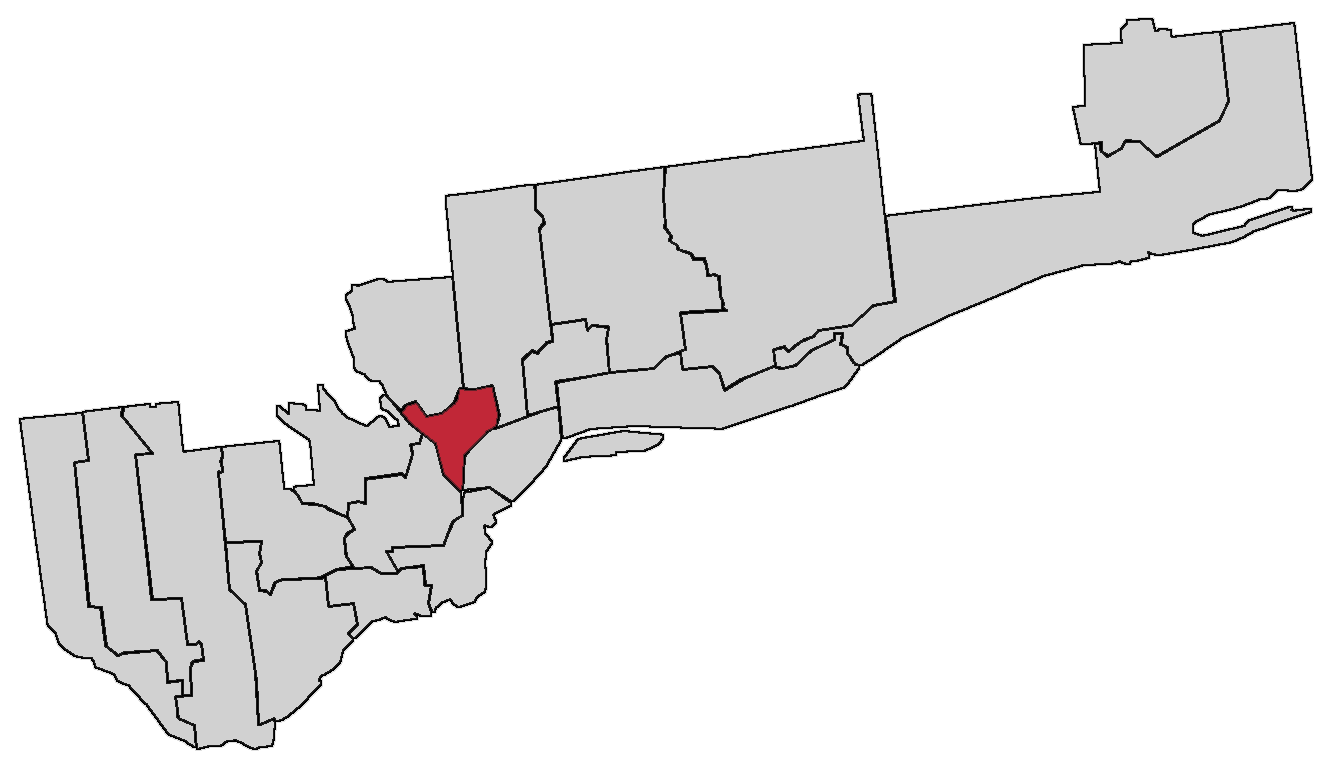
- Location of Touraine District in Gatineau
- City: Gatineau
- Population: 9,808 (2019)
- Area: 4.94 km²

Current constituency
- Created: 2000
Councillor
Tiffany-Lee Norris Parent
AG
- Sector(s): Gatineau
- First contested: 2001 election
- Last contested: 2021 election

Touraine District (District 11) is a municipal electoral division in the city of Gatineau, Quebec. It is represented on Gatineau City Council by Tiffany-Lee Norris Parent of Action Gatineau. The district was known as Riverains District from 2002 to 2009.

The district is located in the Gatineau sector of the city. The district includes the neighbourhoods of Riviera, Touraine, Val d'Oise and Le Baron. Much of the district lies in the former municipality of Touraine.

== Councillors ==
Council term	Party	Member
Riverains District
2002–2005	Independent	Thérèse Cyr
2005–2009	Independent	Denis Tassé
Touraine District
2009–2013	Independent	Denis Tassé
2013–2017	Independent	Denis Tassé
2017–2021	Independent	Nathalie Lemieux
2021–2025	Action Gatineau	Tiffany-Lee Norris Parent

== Election results ==
=== 2021 ===
Party	Candidate	Vote	%
Action Gatineau	Tiffany-Lee Norris Parent	1,289	38.43
Independent	Jean-Manuel Bock	1,098	32.74
Independent	Jean-Pierre Leroux	967	28.83

=== 2017 ===
Party	Candidate	Vote	%
Independent	Nathalie Lemieux	2,449	58.73
Independent	Yves Durand	655	15.71
Action Gatineau	Mahmoud Rida	603	14.46
Independent	Charles Monette	463	11.10

=== 2013 ===
Party	Candidate	Vote	%
Independent	Denis Tassé	2,533	61.02
Action Gatineau	Alexandre Fortin-Bordeleau	1,618	38.98

=== 2009 ===
Candidate	Votes	%
Denis Tassé	2,382	65.24
Thérèse Cyr	1,269	34.76

=== 2005 ===
Candidate	Votes	%
Denis Tassé	2,360	54.03
François P. D’Aoust	2,008	45.97

=== 2001 ===
2001 Gatineau municipal election: Riverains
Party	Candidate	Popular vote			Expenditures
Party	Candidate	Votes	%	±%	Expenditures
Independent	Thérèse Cyr	Acclaimed	–	–	none listed
Total valid votes		–	–		
Total rejected, unmarked and declined votes		–	–	–	
Turnout		–	–	–	
Eligible voters		–			
Note: Candidate campaign colours, unless a member of a party, may be based on the prominent colour used in campaign items (signs, literature, etc.) or colours used in polling graphs and are used as a visual differentiation between candidates.
Sources: Office of the City Clerk of Gatineau
