= Orée-du-Parc District =

Municipal electoral division in Gatineau, Quebec, Canada

District 9 - Orée-du-Parc
- Constituency for the Gatineau City Council
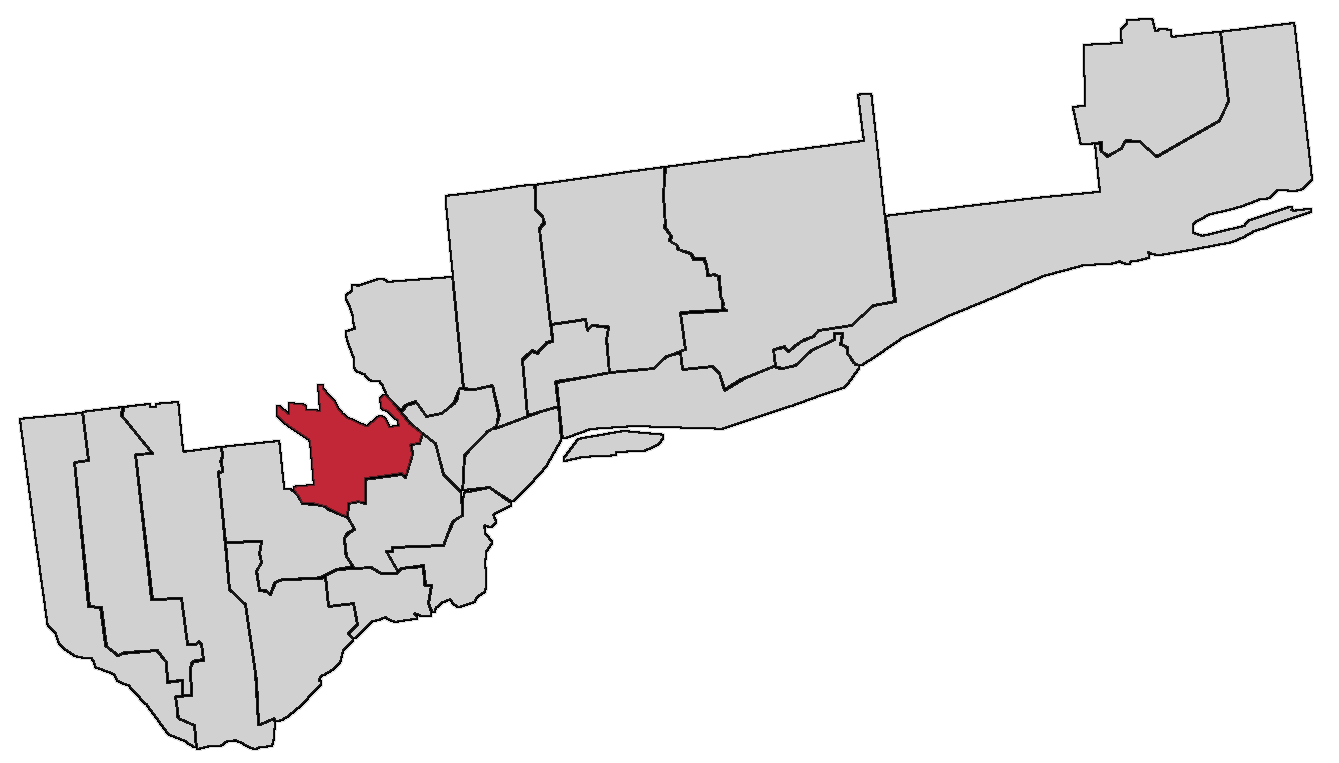
- Location of Orée-du-Parc District in Gatineau
- City: Gatineau
- Population: 10,931 (2019)
- Area: 10.30 km²

Current constituency
- Created: 2000
Councillor
Isabelle N. Miron
AG
- Sector(s): Hull
- First contested: 2001 election
- Last contested: 2021 election

Orée-du-Parc District (District 9) is a municipal electoral division in the city of Gatineau, Quebec. It is currently served on Gatineau City Council by Isabelle N. Miron of Action Gatineau.

The district is located in the Hull sector of the city. It includes the northern part of Hull, including the neighbourhoods of Mont-Blue, Ironside, and part of Parc de la Montagne. The district's name translates to "the edge of the park," referring to Gatineau Park, to which it is adjacent.

== Councillors ==
Council term	Party	Member
2002–2005	Independent	Louise Poirier (Note: Resigned.)
2005–2009	Independent	Louise Poirier
2005–2009	Independent	Claude Millette
2009–2013	Independent	Mireille Apollon
2009–2013	Action Gatineau	Mireille Apollon
2013–2017	Action Gatineau	Mireille Apollon
2017–2021	Action Gatineau	Isabelle N. Miron
2021–2025	Action Gatineau	Isabelle N. Miron

== Election results ==
=== 2021 ===
Party	Candidate	Vote	%
Action Gatineau	Isabelle N. Miron	2,540	61.95
Independent	Jacques Lacasse	1,560	38.05

=== 2017 ===
Party	Candidate	Vote	%
Action Gatineau	Isabelle N. Miron	2,356	52.25
Independent	Marc-André Pelletier	2,153	47.75

=== 2013 ===
Party	Candidate	Vote	%
Action Gatineau	Mireille Apollon	2,983	58.58
Independent	Bruno Bonneville	2,109	41.42

=== 2009 ===
Candidate	Vote	%
Mireille Apollon	2,750	65.1
Claude Millette	1,474	34.9

=== 2008 by-election ===
An election was held on October 26 to fill the seat vacated by Ms. Poirier.

Candidate	Votes	%
Claude Millette	784	32.7
Mireille Apollon	771	32.2
René Laprise	508	21.2
Armand Legault	238	9.9
Rhéal Loyer	96	4.0

=== 2005 ===
Candidate	Votes	%
Louise Poirier	3552	68.6
Armand Legault	933	18.0
Sébastien Béland	696	13.4

=== 2001 ===
2001 Gatineau municipal election: Orée-du-Parc
Party	Candidate	Popular vote			Expenditures
Party	Candidate	Votes	%	±%	Expenditures
Independent	Louise Poirier	Acclaimed	–	–	none listed
Total valid votes		–	–		
Total rejected, unmarked and declined votes		–	–	–	
Turnout		–	–	–	
Eligible voters		–			
Note: Candidate campaign colours, unless a member of a party, may be based on the prominent colour used in campaign items (signs, literature, etc.) or colours used in polling graphs and are used as a visual differentiation between candidates.
Sources: Office of the City Clerk of Gatineau
