= Buckingham District =

Municipal electoral division in Gatineau, Quebec, Canada

Coordinates: 45°35′N 75°25′W

District 19 - Buckingham
- Constituency for the Gatineau City Council
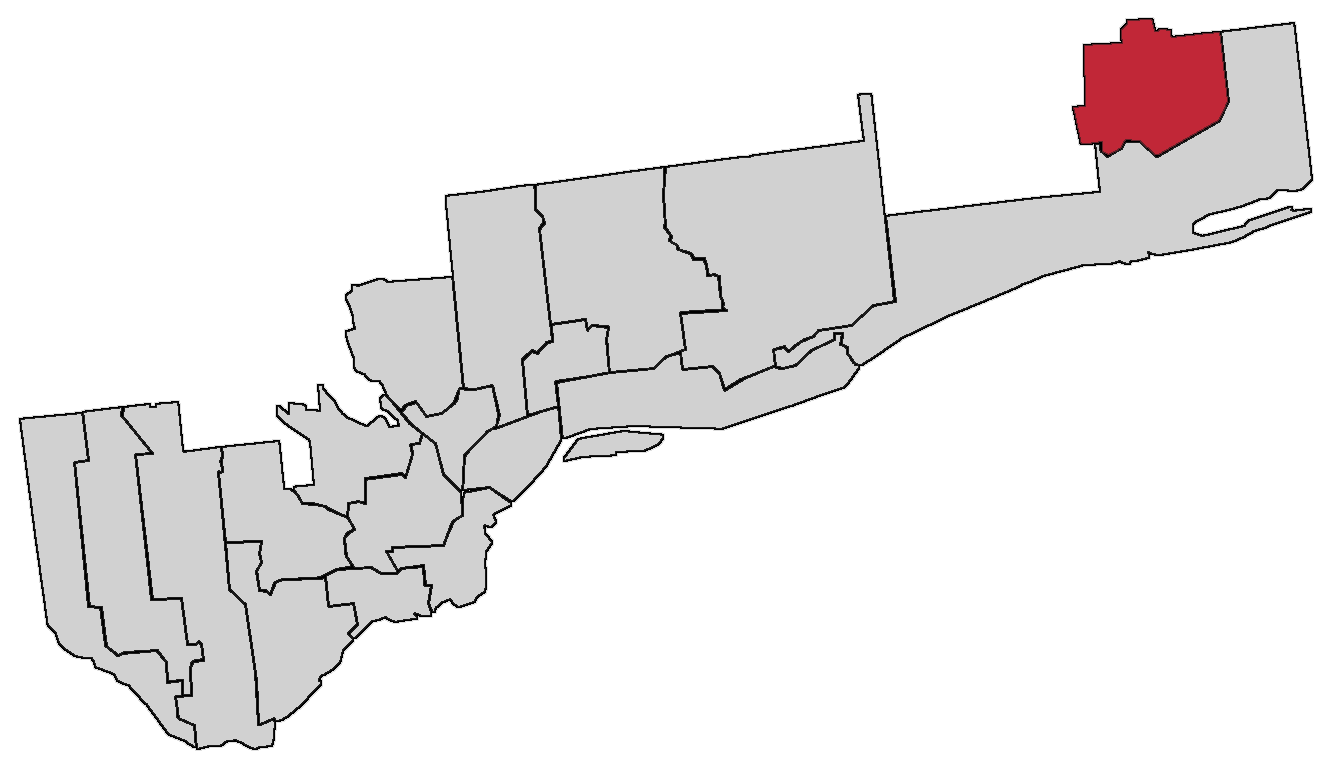
- Location of Buckingham District in Gatineau
- City: Gatineau
- Population: 10,714 (2019)
- Area: 18.14 km²

Current constituency
- Created: 2000
Councillor
Edmond Leclerc
Independent
- Sector(s): Buckingham
- First contested: 2001 election
- Last contested: 2021 election

Buckingham District (District 19) is a municipal electoral division in the city of Gatineau, Quebec. It is represented on Gatineau City Council by Edmond Leclerc.

The district consists of the former city of Buckingham, in Gatineau's far east end.

== Councillors ==
Council term	Party	Member
2002–2005	Independent	Jocelyne Houle
2005–2009	Independent	Jocelyne Houle
2009–2013	Independent	Maxime Pedneaud-Jobin
2009–2013	Action Gatineau	Maxime Pedneaud-Jobin
2013–2017	Action Gatineau	Martin Lajeunesse
2017–2021	Action Gatineau	Martin Lajeunesse
2021–2025	Independent	Edmond Leclerc

== Election results ==
=== 2021 ===
Party	Candidate	Vote	%
Independent	Edmond Leclerc	2,248	57.52
Action Gatineau	Martin Lajeunesse	1,158	29.63
Independent	Michel Roy	502	12.85

=== 2017 ===
Party	Candidate	Vote	%
Action Gatineau	Martin Lajeunesse	2,181	56.17
Independent	Edmond Leclerc	1,702	43.83

=== 2013 ===
Party	Candidate	Vote	%
Action Gatineau	Martin Lajeunesse	3,249	73.11
Independent	Yan Hébert	1,195	26.89

=== 2009 ===
Candidate	Votes	%
Maxime Pedneaud-Jobin	2,188	54.45
Luc St-Jacques	862	21.45
Lévis Brazeau	612	15.23
Carl G. Simpson	356	8.86

=== 2005 ===
Candidate	Votes	%
Jocelyne Houle	2,650	63.75
Carl G. Simpson	1,507	36.25

=== 2001 ===
2001 Gatineau municipal election: Buckingham
Party	Candidate	Popular vote			Expenditures
Party	Candidate	Votes	%	±%	Expenditures
Independent	Jocelyne Houle	Acclaimed	–	–	none listed
Total valid votes		–	–		
Total rejected, unmarked and declined votes		–	–	–	
Turnout		–	–	–	
Eligible voters		–			
Note: Candidate campaign colours, unless a member of a party, may be based on the prominent colour used in campaign items (signs, literature, etc.) or colours used in polling graphs and are used as a visual differentiation between candidates.
Sources: Office of the City Clerk of Gatineau
