= Stefan Psenak =

Stefan Psenak (born 1969 in Joliette, Quebec) is a Canadian poet, playwright, novelist and politician from Quebec.

He won the Trillium Book Award in 1998 for Du chaos et de l'ordre des choses, and was a nominee for the Governor General's Award for French-language poetry in 2001 for La beauté.

He served on Gatineau City Council from 2009 to 2013, representing Aylmer District. He was first elected in the 2009 Gatineau municipal election, but was defeated by Josée Lacasse in the 2013 Gatineau municipal election. He was one of the founding members of the Action Gatineau political party.
