= Maison du Citoyen =

City hall of Gatineau, Ontario, Canada

- Citizen's House
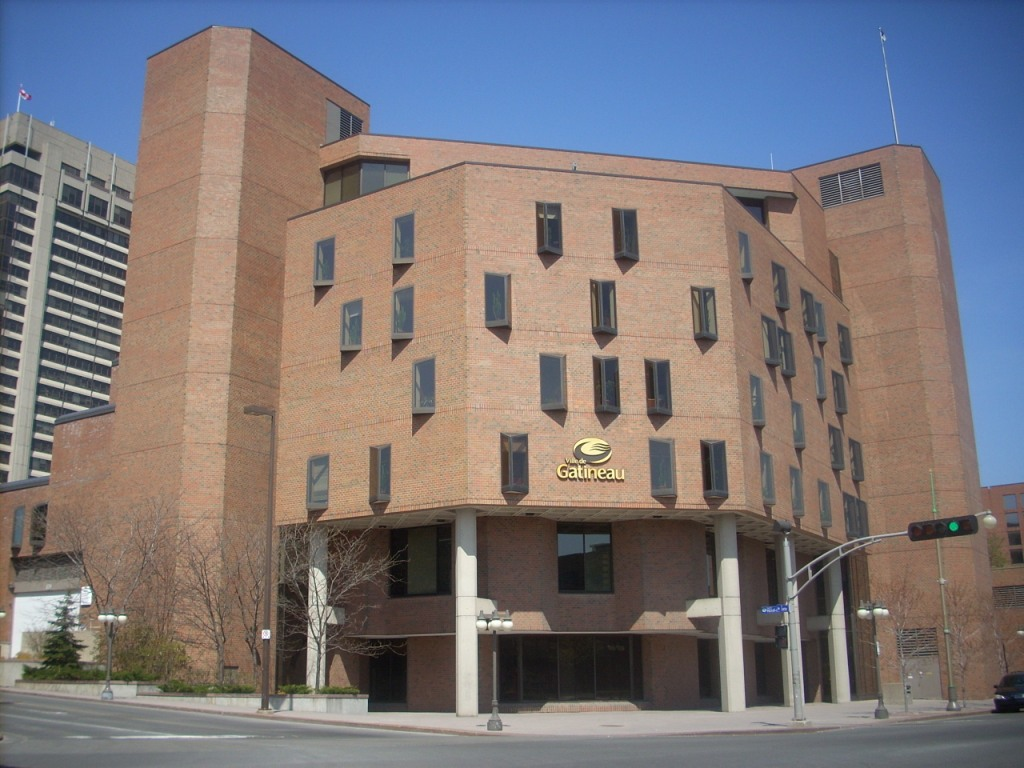
- Section of Maison du Citoyen at the intersection of Laurier Street and Rue de l'Hôtel-de-Ville
- Interactive map of the Maison du Citoyen area

General information
- Type: City Hall
- Location: 25 Laurier Street, Gatineau, Quebec, Canada
- Coordinates: 45.4281°N 75.7107°W
- Construction started: September 25, 1978
- Inaugurated: October 25, 1980; 45 years ago

Design and construction
- Architects: Daniel Lazosky and Pierre Cayer

The Maison du Citoyen (English: Citizen's House; unofficial) is the city hall of Gatineau, Quebec, Canada. Located in the city's central business district of Hull, it was previously the City of Hull's city hall until it was amalgamated into the City of Gatineau alongside the neighbouring municipalities of Aylmer, Buckingham and Masson-Angers.
