= Hull–Wright District =

Municipal electoral division in Gatineau, Quebec, Canada

Coordinates: 45.432°N 75.727°W

District 7 - Hull–Wright
- Constituency for the Gatineau City Council
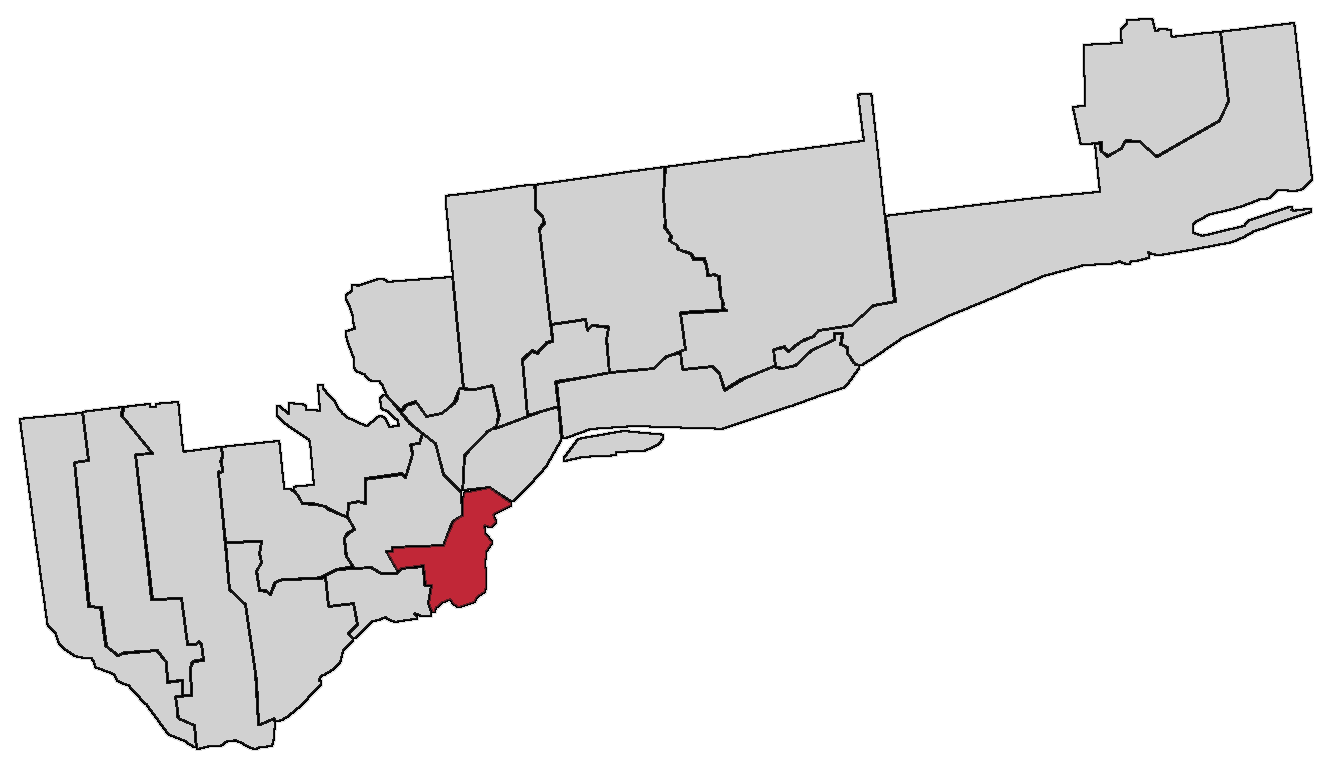
- Location of Hull–Wright District in Gatineau
- City: Gatineau
- Population: 9,281 (2019)
- Area: 9.05 km²

Current constituency
- Created: 2000
Councillor
Steve Moran
AG
- Sector(s): Hull
- First contested: 2001 election
- Last contested: 2021 election

Hull–Wright District (District 7) is a municipal electoral division in the city of Gatineau, Quebec. From 2001 to 2009 it was known as Hull District and from 2009 to 2013 as Hull–Val-Tétreau. It is represented on Gatineau City Council by Steve Moran of Action Gatineau.

The district is located in the Hull sector of the city. It includes all of Downtown Hull plus part of the neighbourhood of Wrightville.

From 2009 to 2013, it also included Val-Tétreau, Jardins Mackenzie-King and Jardins Alexandre-Taché.

Prior to the 2009 election, the district did not include Val-Tétreau, or Jardins Alexandre-Taché, and only the eastern half of Jardins Mackenzie-King. The district also included the southern end of Wrightville, south of Rue St-Jean-Bosco. The added parts came from Val-Tétreau District, which was abolished. Despite the name being added, only a small part of Val-Tétreau joined Hull.

== Councillors ==
Council term	Party	Member
Hull District
2002–2005	Independent	Denise Laferrière
2005–2009	Independent	Denise Laferrière
Hull–Val-Tétreau District
2009–2013	Independent	Denise Laferrière
Hull–Wright District
2013–2017	Independent	Denise Laferrière
2017–2021	Action Gatineau	Cédric Tessier
2021–2025	Action Gatineau	Steve Moran

== Election results ==
=== 2021 ===
Party	Candidate	Vote	%
Action Gatineau	Steve Moran	1,203	48.57
Independent	René Coignaud	679	27.41
Independent	Jacques G. Lavoie	595	24.02

=== 2017 ===
Party	Candidate	Vote	%
Action Gatineau	Cédric Tessier	1,199	44.03
Independent	Pierre Samson	691	25.38
Independent	René Coignaud	483	17.74
Independent	Marcel Pépin	350	12.85

=== 2013 ===
Party	Candidate	Vote	%
Independent	Denise Laferrière	1,678	58.75
Action Gatineau	Isabelle N. Miron	1,049	36.73
Independent	Debelle Michel	129	4.52

=== 2009 ===
Candidate	Votes	%
Denise Laferrière	1,708	52.16
Pierre Ducasse	1,197	39.62
Mintri Nguyen	260	8.21

=== 2005 ===
Candidate	Votes	%
Denise Laferrière	2,061	65.37
Jean-Baptiste Gavazzi	1,018	32.29
Gheorghe Irimia	74	2.35

=== 2001 ===
2001 Gatineau municipal election: Hull
Party	Candidate	Popular vote			Expenditures
Party	Candidate	Votes	%	±%	Expenditures
Independent	Denise Laferrière	1,547	39.39	–	none listed
Independent	Jocelyn Blondin	1,535	39.09	–	none listed
Independent	José Rego	690	17.57	–	none listed
Independent	Richard Laramée	155	3.95	–	none listed
Total valid votes		3,927	97.30		
Total rejected, unmarked and declined votes		109	2.70	–	
Turnout		4,036	42.95	–	
Eligible voters		9,398			
Note: Candidate campaign colours, unless a member of a party, may be based on the prominent colour used in campaign items (signs, literature, etc.) or colours used in polling graphs and are used as a visual differentiation between candidates.
Sources: Office of the City Clerk of Gatineau
