= Gatineau City Council =

Gatineau City Council Conseil municipal de Gatineau
- 2025–2029 term
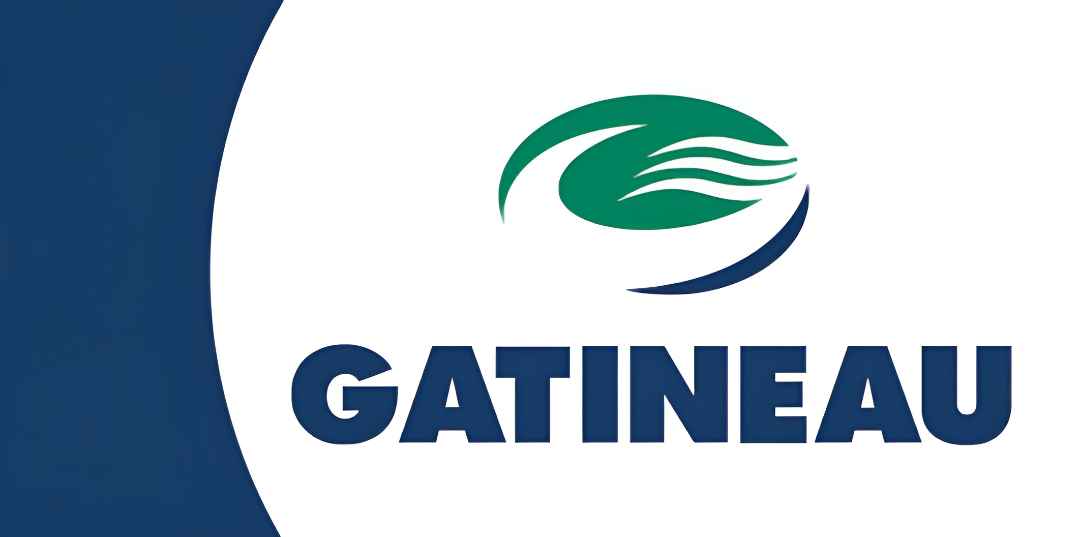
- Flag of Gatineau

Type
- Type: Unicameral city council

Leadership
- Mayor: Maude Marquis-Bissonnette, Action Gatineau since June 18, 2024
- Speaker: Vincent Roy, Action Gatineau since November 25, 2025

Structure
- Seats: 19 plus the Mayor
- Political groups: Action Gatineau (12) Gatineau ensemble (4) Independent (4)
- Length of term: Four years, renewable
- Authority: Charter of the Ville de Gatineau
- Salary: CA$57,660

Elections
- Last election: November 2, 2025 (20 seats)
- Next election: November 4, 2029 (20 seats)

Meeting place
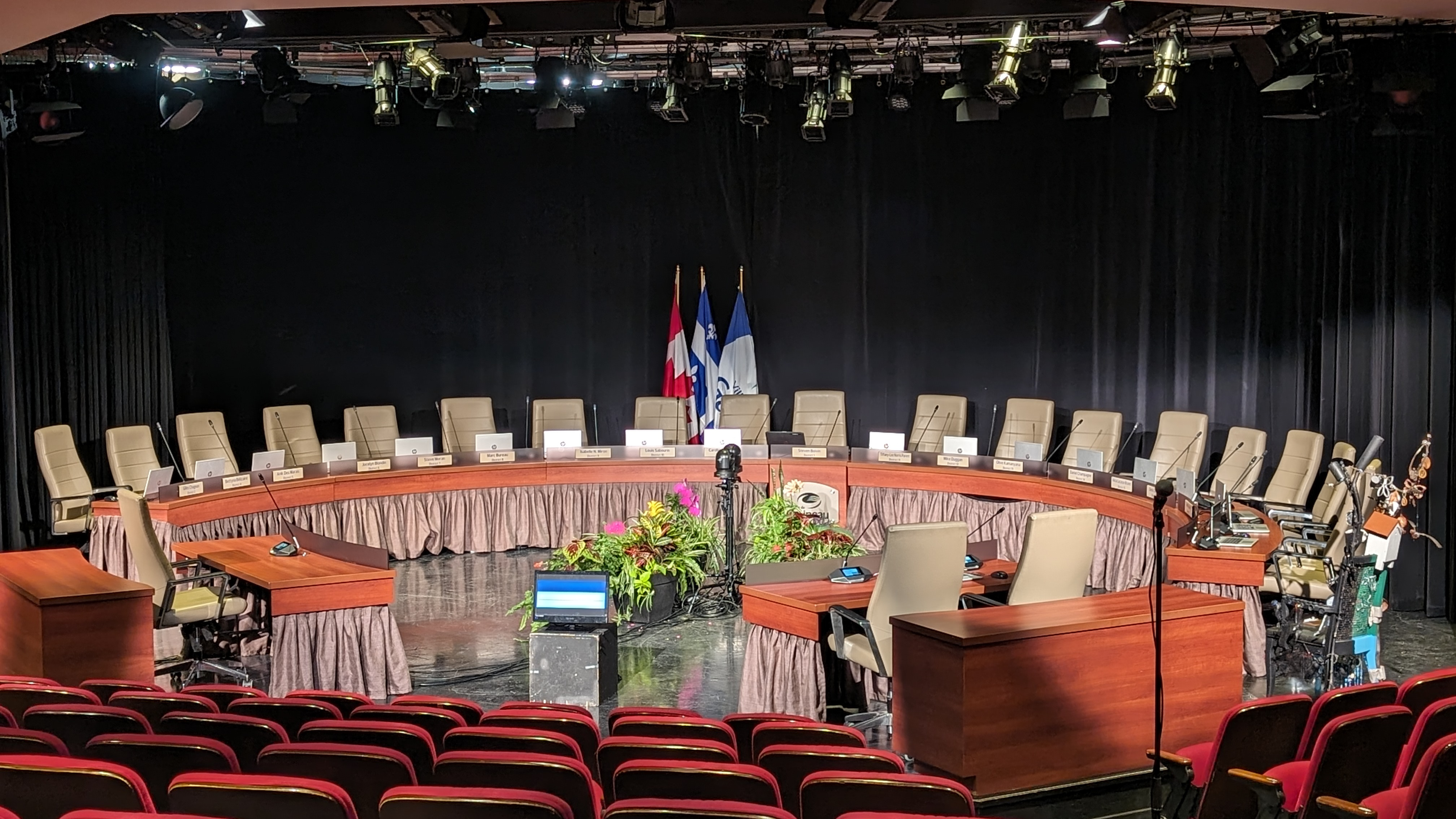
- Jean-Despréz Hall; Maison du Citoyen; Gatineau, Quebec

Website
- gatineau.ca

Gatineau City Council (French: Conseil municipal de Gatineau) is the governing body for the mayor–council government in the city of Gatineau, Quebec, Canada. It is composed of 19 city councillors and the mayor. The mayor is elected at large, while each councillor represents wards throughout the city. Council members are elected to four-year terms, with the last election being on November 7, 2021. The council meets at the Maison du Citoyen in the Hull sector. Much of the council's work is done in the standing committees made up of sub-groups of councillors. The decisions made in these committees are presented to the full council and voted upon.

The head of the city council is called the speaker. The current speaker is Steven Boivin, the Independent city councillor for Aylmer District.

== Committees and commissions ==
=== Standing Committees ===
- Audit Committee
- Demolition Requests Committee
- Executive Committee
- Finance Committee
- Investment and Asset Management Committee
- Toponymy Committee

=== Advisory Committees ===
- Agriculture
- Urban Planning

=== Other committees and commissions ===
- Citizen Participation Working Committee
- Housing Shock Committee
- Arts, Culture, Literature and Heritage Commission
- Community Life Commission
- Economic Development Commission
- Environment and Climate Change Commission
- Gatineau, ville en santé Commission
- Public Safety Commission
- Seniors Commission
- Transportation, Sustainable Transit and Safety Commission
- Youth Commission

== 2025–2029 members ==
Name	Party	District
Maude Marquis-Bissonnette	Action Gatineau	Mayor
Vincent Roy	Action Gatineau	Aylmer (1)
Sonia Ben-Arfa	Action Gatineau	Lucerne (2)
Caroline Murray	Action Gatineau	Deschênes (3)
Bettyna Belizaire	Action Gatineau	Plateau (4)
Rachel Deslauriers	Action Gatineau	Mitigomijokan (5)
Adrian Corbo	Action Gatineau	Manoir-des-Trembles–Val-Tétreau (6)
Steve Moran	Action Gatineau	Hull–Wright (7)
Isabelle Cousineau	Action Gatineau	Parc-de-la-Montagne–Saint-Raymond (8)
Isabelle N. Miron	Action Gatineau	Orée-du-Parc (9)
Julie Bélisle	Équipe Mario Aubé; Gatineau ensemble (from November 24, 2025)	Limbour (10)
Tiffany-Lee Norris Parent	Action Gatineau	Touraine (11)
Marc Carrière	Équipe Mario Aubé	Pointe-Gatineau (12)
Marc Carrière	Independent (since November 20, 2025)	Pointe-Gatineau (12)
Catherine Craig-St-Louis	Action Gatineau	Carrefour-de-l'Hôpital (13)
Luc Chénier	Équipe Mario Aubé; Gatineau ensemble (from November 24, 2025)	Versant (14)
Chloé Bourgeois	Équipe Mario Aubé; Gatineau ensemble (from November 24, 2025)	Bellevue (15)
Timmy Jutras	Équipe Mario Aubé; Gatineau ensemble (from November 24, 2025)	Lac-Beauchamp (16)
Jean Lessard	Équipe Mario Aubé	Rivière-Blanche (17)
Jean Lessard	Independent (since November 24, 2025)	Rivière-Blanche (17)
Michael Korhonen	Équipe Mario Aubé	Masson-Angers (18)
Michael Korhonen	Independent (since November 21, 2025)	Masson-Angers (18)
Edmond Leclerc	Independent	Buckingham (19)

== 2021–2025 members ==
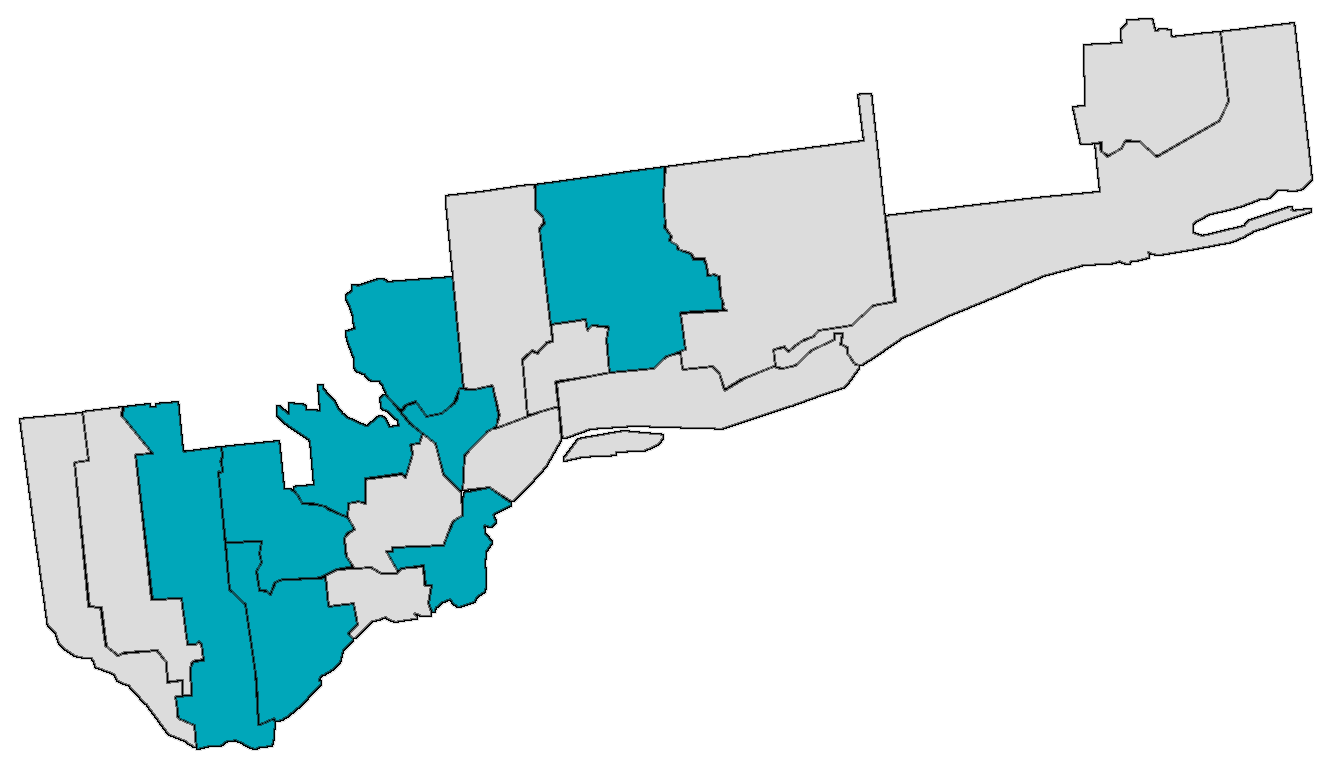
A map showing the 2021-2025 membership of the council, excluding the Mayor, by district.

Name	Party	District
France Bélisle (until February 22, 2024)	Independent	Mayor
Maude Marquis-Bissonnette (since June 18, 2024)	Action Gatineau	Mayor
Steven Boivin	Independent	Aylmer (1)
Gilles Chagnon	Independent	Lucerne (2)
Caroline Murray	Action Gatineau	Deschênes (3)
Bettyna Belizaire	Action Gatineau	Plateau (4)
Anik Des Marais	Action Gatineau	Mitigomijokan (5)
Jocelyn Blondin	Independent	Manoir-des-Trembles–Val-Tétreau (6)
Steve Moran	Action Gatineau	Hull–Wright (7)
Louise Boudrias (until August 14, 2022)	Independent	Parc-de-la-Montagne–Saint-Raymond (8)
Marc Bureau (from October 23, 2022)	Independent	Parc-de-la-Montagne–Saint-Raymond (8)
Isabelle N. Miron	Action Gatineau	Orée-du-Parc (9)
Louis Sabourin	Action Gatineau	Limbour (10)
Tiffany-Lee Norris Parent	Action Gatineau	Touraine (11)
Mike Duggan	Independent	Pointe-Gatineau (12)
Olive Kamanyana (until April 25, 2024)	Independent	Carrefour-de-l'Hôpital (13)
Catherine Craig-St-Louis (from June 10, 2024)	Action Gatineau	Carrefour-de-l'Hôpital (13)
Daniel Champagne	Independent	Versant (14)
Alicia Brunet-Lacasse	Action Gatineau	Bellevue (15)
Denis Girouard	Independent	Lac-Beauchamp (16)
Jean Lessard	Independent	Rivière-Blanche (17)
Jean Lessard	Équipe Mario Aubé (since March 10, 2025)	Rivière-Blanche (17)
Mario Aubé	Independent	Masson-Angers (18)
Mario Aubé	Équipe Mario Aubé (since January 10, 2025)	Masson-Angers (18)
Edmond Leclerc	Independent	Buckingham (19)

== 2017–2021 members ==
Name	Party	District
Maxime Pedneaud-Jobin	Action Gatineau	Mayor
Audrey Bureau	Independent	Aylmer (1)
Gilles Chagnon	Independent	Lucerne (2)
Mike Duggan	Independent	Deschênes (3)
Maude Marquis-Bissonnette	Action Gatineau	Plateau (4)
Jocelyn Blondin	Independent	Manoir-des-Trembles-Val-Tétreau (5)
Isabelle N. Miron	Action Gatineau	Orée-du-Parc (6)
Louise Boudrias	Independent	Parc-de-la-Montagne-Saint-Raymond (7)
Cédric Tessier	Action Gatineau	Hull-Wright (8)
Renée Amyot	Action Gatineau	Limbour (9)
Nathalie Lemieux	Independent	Touraine (10)
Myriam Nadeau	Action Gatineau	Pointe-Gatineau (11)
Gilles Carpentier	Independent	Carrefour-de-l'Hôpital (12)
Daniel Champagne	Independent	Versant (13)
Pierre Lanthier	Independent	Bellevue (14)
Jean-François LeBlanc	Independent	Lac-Beauchamp (15)
Jean Lessard	Independent	Rivière-Blanche (16)
Marc Carrière	Independent	Masson-Angers (17)
Martin Lajeunesse	Action Gatineau	Buckingham (18)

== 2013–2017 members ==
Name	Party	District
Maxime Pedneaud-Jobin	Action Gatineau	Mayor
Josée Lacasse	Independent	Aylmer (1)
Mike Duggan	Independent	Lucerne (2)
Richard M. Bégin	Action Gatineau	Deschênes (3)
Maxime Tremblay	Independent	Plateau (4)
Jocelyn Blondin	Independent	Manoir-des-Trembles-Val-Tétreau (5)
Mireille Apollon	Action Gatineau	Orée-du-Parc (6)
Louise Boudrias	Independent	Parc-de-la-Montagne-Saint-Raymond (7)
Denise Laferrière	Independent	Hull-Wright (8)
Cédric Tessier	Independent	Limbour (9)
Denis Tassé	Independent	Touraine (10)
Myriam Nadeau	Action Gatineau	Pointe-Gatineau (11)
Gilles Carpentier	Independent	Carrefour-de-l'Hôpital (12)
Daniel Champagne	Independent	Versant (13)
Sylvie Goneau	Independent	Bellevue (14)
Stéphane Lauzon (until October 19, 2015)	Independent	Lac-Beauchamp (15)
Jean-François Leblanc (since March 7, 2016)	Independent	Lac-Beauchamp (15)
Jean Lessard	Independent	Rivière-Blanche (16)
Marc Carrière	Independent	Masson-Angers (17)
Martin Lajeunesse	Action Gatineau	Buckingham (18)

== 2009–2013 members ==
Name	Party	District
Marc Bureau	Independent	Mayor
Stefan Psenak	Independent (until June 16, 2012)	Aylmer (1)
Stefan Psenak	Action Gatineau (since June 16, 2012)	Aylmer (1)
André Laframboise	Independent (until June 16, 2012)	Lucerne (2)
André Laframboise	Action Gatineau (since June 16, 2012)	Lucerne (2)
Alain Riel	Independent	Deschênes (3)
Maxime Tremblay	Independent	Plateau–Manoir-des-Trembles (4)
Patrice Martin	Independent	Wright–Parc-de-la-Montagne (5)
Mireille Apollon	Independent (until June 16, 2012)	Orée-du-Parc (6)
Mireille Apollon	Action Gatineau (since June 16, 2012)	Orée-du-Parc (6)
Pierre Philion	Independent	Saint-Raymond–Vanier (7)
Denise Laferrière	Independent	Hull–Val-Tétreau (8)
Nicole Champagne	Independent	Limbour (9)
Denis Tassé	Independent	Touraine (10)
Luc Angers	Independent (until June 16, 2012)	Promenades District (11)
Luc Angers	Action Gatineau (since June 16, 2012)	Promenades District (11)
Patsy Bouthillette	Independent	Carrefour-de-l'Hôpital (12)
Joseph De Sylva	Independent	Versant (13)
Sylvie Goneau	Independent	Bellevue (14)
Stéphane Lauzon	Independent	Lac-Beauchamp (15)
Yvon Boucher	Independent	Rivière-Blanche (16)
Luc Montreuil	Independent	Masson-Angers (17)
Maxime Pedneaud-Jobin	Independent (until June 16, 2012)	Buckingham (18)
Maxime Pedneaud-Jobin	Action Gatineau (since June 16, 2012)	Buckingham (18)

== 2005–2009 members ==
Name	Party	District
Marc Bureau	Independent	Mayor
Frank Thérien	Independent	Aylmer (1)
André Laframboise	Independent	Lucerne (2)
Alain Riel	Independent	Deschênes (3)
Alain Pilon	Independent	Plateau–Manoir-des-Trembles (4)
Patrice Martin	Independent	Wright–Parc-de-la-Montagne (5)
Louise Poirier (until August 10, 2008)	Independent	Orée-du-Parc (6)
Claude Millette (since October 26, 2008)	Independent	Orée-du-Parc (6)
Pierre Philion	Independent	Saint-Raymond–Vanier (7)
Denise Laferrière	Independent	Hull (8)
Simon Racine	Independent	Limbour (9)
Denis Tassé	Independent	Riverains (10)
Luc Angers	Independent	Promenades District (11)
Joseph De Sylva	Independent	Versant (12)
Richard Côté	Independent	Bellevue (13)
Aurèle Desjardins	Independent	Lac-Beauchamp (14)
Yvon Boucher	Independent	Rivière-Blanche (15)
Luc Montreuil	Independent	Masson-Angers (16)
Jocelyne Houle	Independent	Buckingham (17)

== 2002–2005 members ==
Name	Party	District
Yves Ducharme	Independent	Mayor
Andé Levac	Independent	Aylmer (1)
Alain Labonté	Independent	Lucerne (2)
André Touchet (until September 11, 2002)	Independent	Deschênes (3)
Richard Jennings (since November 24, 2002)	Independent	Deschênes (3)
Lawrence Cannon	Independent	Val-Tétreau (4)
Marc Bureau	Independent	Wright–Parc-de-la-Montagne (5)
Louise Poirier	Independent	Orée-du-Parc (6)
Pierre Philion	Independent	Saint-Raymond–Vanier (7)
Denise Laferrière	Independent	Hull (8)
Simon Racine	Independent	Limbour (9)
Thérèse Cyr	Independent	Riverains (10)
Paul Morin	Independent	Promenades (11)
Joseph De Sylva	Independent	Versant (12)
Richard Côté	Independent	Bellevue (13)
Aurèle Desjardins	Independent	Lac-Beauchamp (14)
Yvon Boucher	Independent	Rivière-Blanche (15)
Luc Montreuil	Independent	Masson-Angers (16)
Jocelyne Houle	Independent	Buckingham (17)

== Pre-amalgamated Gatineau City Councils ==
=== Ville de Gatineau (1975-2001) ===
==== 1999–2001 members ====
Name	Party	District
Robert Labine	Independent	Mayor
Jean-Guy Binet	Independent	Limbour (1)
Thérèse Cyr	Independent	Touraine (2)
Marcel Schryer	Independent	Ruisseau (3)
Richard Canuel	Independent	Baron (4)
Joseph De Sylva	Independent	Montée-Paiement (5)
Jacques-R. Forget	Independent	Centre-Ville (6)
Paul Morin	Independent	Baie (7)
Pierre Durand	Independent	Pionniers (8)
Aurèle Desjardins	Independent	Moulin (9)
Richard Côté	Independent	Bellevue (10)
Jean-Pierre Charette	Independent	Belles-Rives (11)
Yvon Boucher	Independent	Rivière-Blanche (12)
