= Gatineau ensemble =

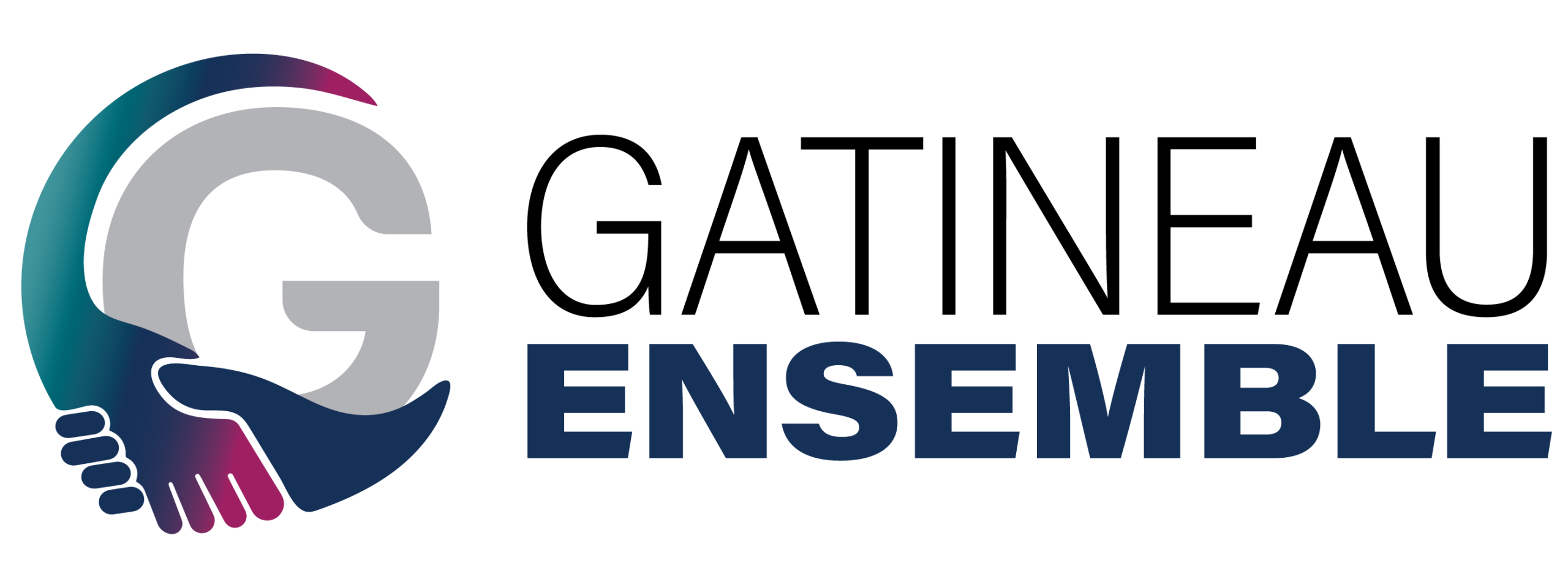
- Leader: Rachel Cousineau (interim)
- Co-directors: Sylvain Tremblay; Mathieu Paquette
- Founder: Mario Aubé
- Founded: January 10, 2025
- Ideology: Localism; Fiscal conservatism
- Political position: Big tent
- Colours: Magenta; Dark blue; Teal
- Seats on council: 4 / 20

Website
- gatineauensemble.ca

Gatineau ensemble, formerly known as Équipe Mario Aubé (ÉMA; English: Team Mario Aubé, TMA), is a municipal political party in Gatineau, Quebec, Canada. The party was founded in 2025 by then-city councillor for Masson-Angers District, Mario Aubé, ahead of his mayoral campaign in the 2025 municipal election.

== Background ==
On November 7, 2024, Aubé officially launched his campaign for Mayor of Gatineau to challenge incumbent Maude Marquis-Bissonnette after he publicly disagreed with the budgetary policies of Action Gatineau. However, issues stemming from the 2024 mayoral by-election regarding the advantages that Action Gatineau has as a political party compared to candidates without party affiliation would've posed an obstacle to his candidacy. Thus, on November 25, 2024, he announced that he was collecting signatures to found a political party; the party officially registered with Élections Québec on January 10, 2025.

Since then, the party has attained interest among local politicians such as Roch Cholette, who Aubé declined to let join the party allegedly due to the aggressive style he took when he ran Yves Ducharme's 2024 by-election campaign, and Rivière-Blanche District city councillor Jean Lessard, who announced he was joining the party and would be its candidate for the district in the 2025 municipal election.

On November 24, 2025, the party officially changed its name to Gatineau Ensemble, while Rachel Cousineau, the candidate for the Mitigomijokan District in the 2025 elections, became its new leader.

== Election results ==
Election	Mayoral candidate	Mayoral popular vote	Change (pp)	Councillors elected (Note: The Mayor is a member of City Council, but for the purposes of documentation is treated as their own individual.)	Council popular vote	Change (pp)	Government
2025	Mario Aubé	47.00%	Steady	7 / 20	45.48%	Steady	Opposition
