= Action Gatineau =

- Active municipal party
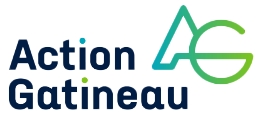
- Leader: Maude Marquis-Bissonnette
- President: Audrey-Ann Chicoine
- Founder: Maxime Pedneaud-Jobin
- Founded: June 16, 2012
- Headquarters: 49, rue du Val-Perché; Gatineau, Quebec; J8Z 2A5
- Ideology: New Urbanism; Environmentalism; Social democracy Localism
- Political position: Centre-left
- Colours: Teal, orange
- Seats on council: 12 / 20

Website
- actiongatineau.org

Action Gatineau (AG), formerly known officially as Équipe Pedneaud-Jobin - Action Gatineau (English: Team Pedneaud-Jobin - Action Gatineau) until February 26, 2021, is a municipal political party in Gatineau, Quebec, Canada. It was the only active municipal political party in Gatineau from 2012 until 2025, when Équipe Mario Aubé was launched.

== Background ==
The party was founded by five Gatineau City Councillors in 2012. Among them was Buckingham District councillor Maxime Pedneaud-Jobin, who was chosen as the party's interim leader. The other councillors who were founding members of the party were Stefan Psenak, Mireille Appolon, André Laframboise and Luc Angers. The party sprung up during a wave of municipal party creation across the province. When the party was created, the members on council began working together to oppose the mayor's agenda, dubbing the remaining independent councillors as "the mayor's party".

Pedneaud-Jobin led the party in the 2013 municipal election as the party's mayoral candidate and won the election. It was seen as an upset victory. Pedneaud-Jobin's opponent, incumbent mayor Marc Bureau was a fierce opponent to municipal political parties, but Pedneaud-Jobin claimed that having a party facilitates handing city's large budgets and "responsibilities over matters such as infrastructure, culture and poverty".

Pedneaud-Jobin was re-elected in the 2017 municipal election. The party ran on a platform of more money for green space, downtown renewal, snow clearing, a new ice hockey arena, and a plan to connect to neighbouring Ottawa's light rail transit system.

After Pedneaud-Jobin retired from politics, the party held a leadership election, in which Plateau District councillor Maude Marquis-Bissonnette was acclaimed on April 6, 2021. She assumed the position on April 25, 2021 at the party's annual general meeting, and formally became the party's mayoral candidate for the 2021 municipal election. Marquis-Bissonnette ran on an environmental sustainability platform, securing federal funding for public transit and tackling climate change. She was defeated by independent candidate France Bélisle in what some saw as upset.

After losing the election, Marquis-Bissonnette resigned as party leader in December 2021. The party nominated Hull-Wright District councillor Steve Moran as interim leader in January 2022. The party launched its leadership election to replace Marquis-Bissonnette on March 20, 2024. Marquis-Bissonnette was the only candidate who ran, and became the leader of the party again.

Marquis-Bissonnette was the party's candidate in the 2024 Gatineau mayoral by-election. She won the election, retaking the city's top job for the party.

== Election results ==
Election	Mayoral candidate	Mayoral popular vote	Change (pp)	Councillors elected (Note: The Mayor is a member of City Council, but for the purposes of documentation is treated as their own individual.)	Council popular vote	Government
2013	Maxime Pedneaud-Jobin	52.61%	Steady	5 / 19	41.65%	Minority
2016 (Note: By-election: voters were asked to fill seats that had been vacated during the term.)	—	—	—	0 / 1	31.74%	Minority
2017	Maxime Pedneaud-Jobin	45.14%	▼7.47	7 / 19	38.70%	Minority
2021	Maude Marquis-Bissonnette	37.65%	▼7.49	8 / 20	38.65%	Opposition
2022	—	—	—	0 / 1	21.43%	Opposition
2024	Maude Marquis-Bissonnette	41.70%	▲4.05	1 / 1	41.76%	Minority
2025	Maude Marquis-Bissonnette	51.14%	▲9.43	12 / 20	47.48%	Majority
