= 2025 Gatineau municipal election =

Municipal election in Quebec, Canada

- Mayoral election
- November 2, 2025
- Turnout: 40.27%
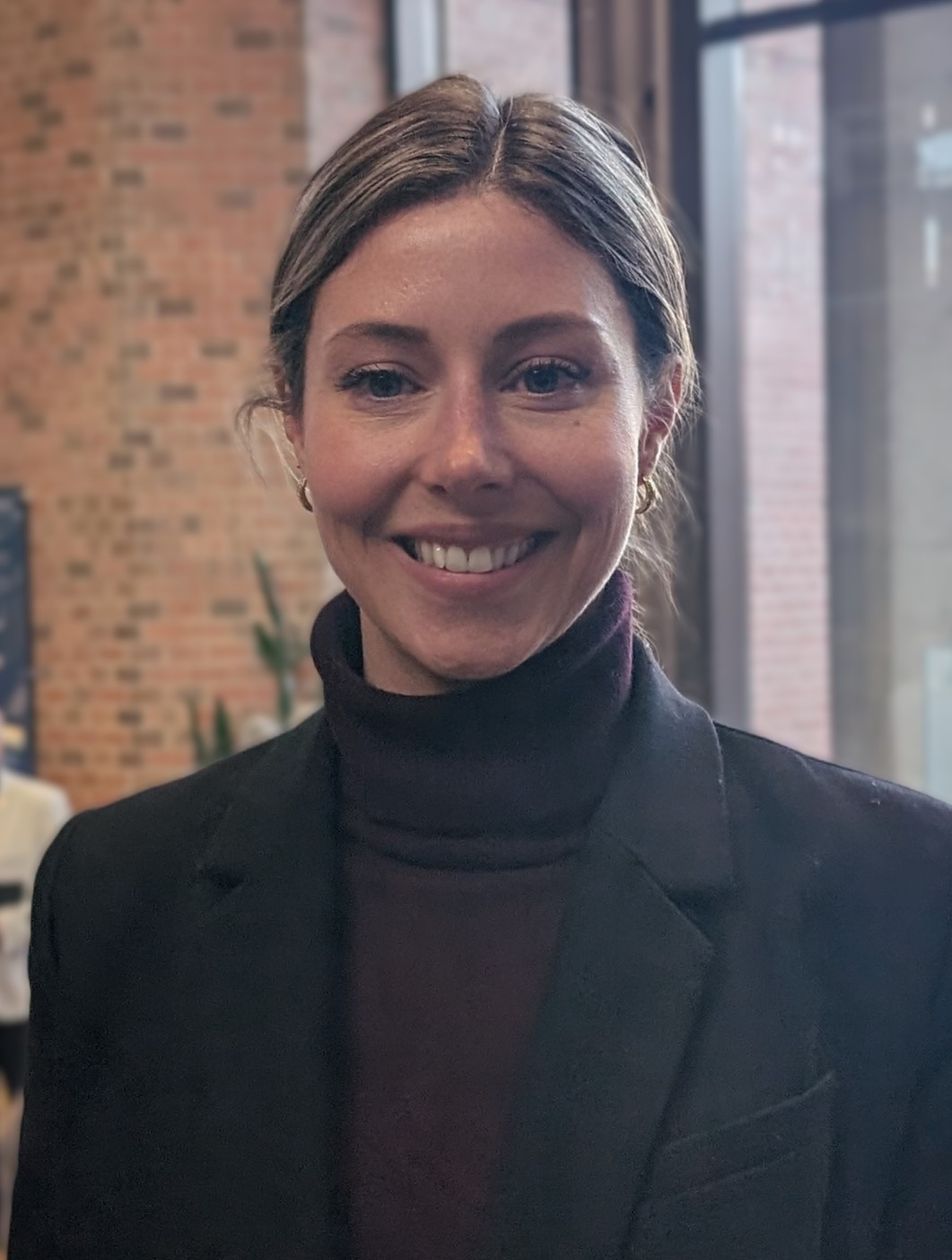

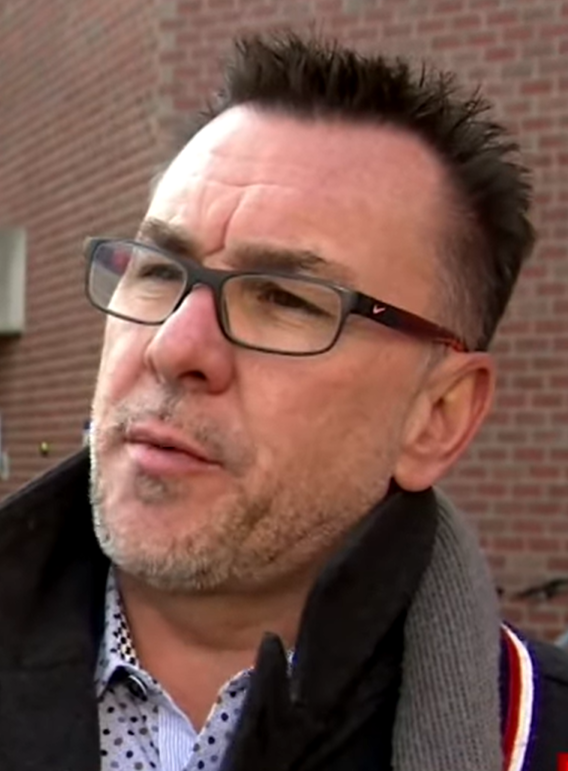
Nominee	Maude Marquis-Bissonnette	Mario Aubé
Party	Action Gatineau	Équipe Mario Aubé
Popular vote	41,569	38,203
Percentage	51.14%	47.00%
- Mayoral election results by district
Mayor before election
Maude Marquis-Bissonnette
Action Gatineau
Elected mayor
Maude Marquis-Bissonnette
Action Gatineau
- City Council election
- November 2, 2025
- 19 seats on Gatineau City Council (Note: The mayor is a member of City Council, but for the purposes of documentation is treated as their own individual.); 10 seats needed for a majority
Party	Leader	Vote %	Seats	+/–
AG	Maude Marquis-Bissonnette	47.48%	11	+3
ÉMA	Mario Aubé	45.48%	7	+7
Independent	–	7.04%	1	−10
This lists parties that won seats. See the complete results below.
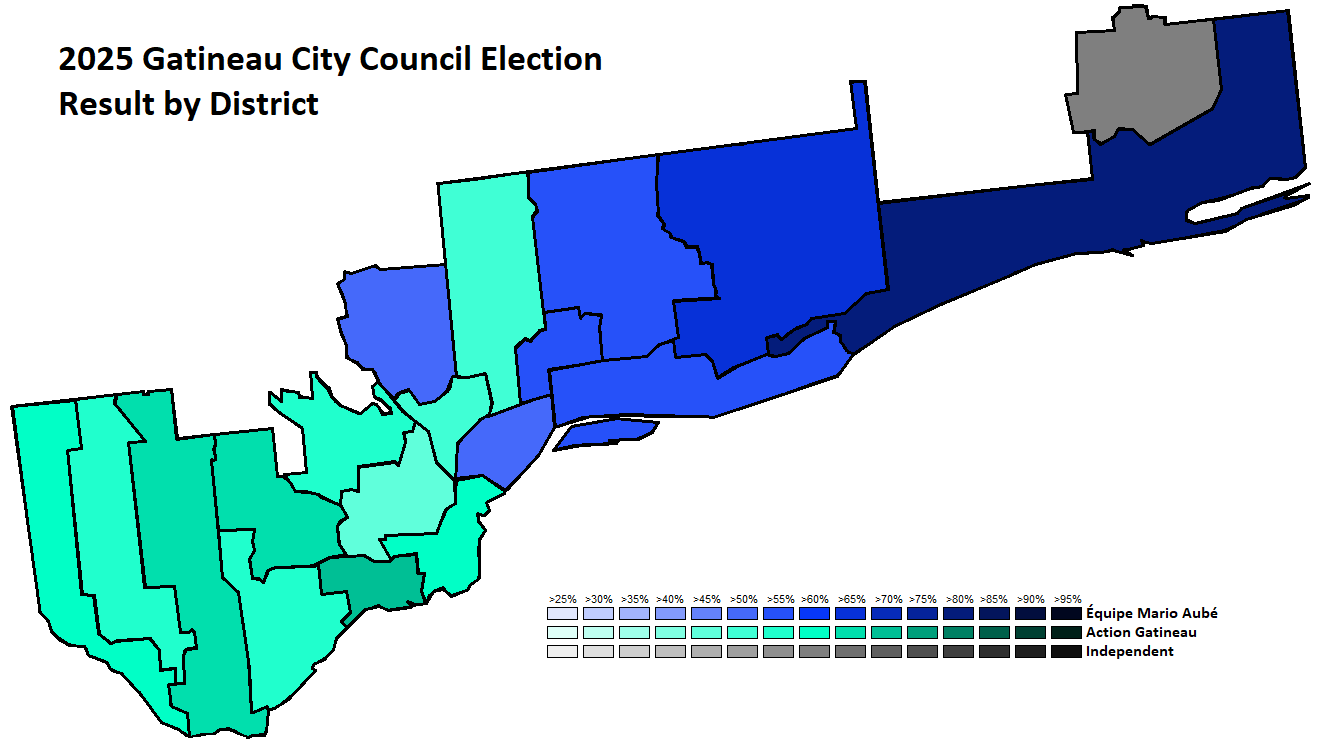
City Council result by district

The 2025 Gatineau municipal election took place on November 2, 2025, to elect a mayor and city councillors in Gatineau, Quebec, Canada. This election was the first in Gatineau's history where more than one political party participated. Incumbent mayor Maude Marquis-Bissonnette ran for re-election.

Candidate nominations opened on September 19 and closed on October 3. The election was held in conjunction with municipal elections held across Quebec on that date.

== Background ==
France Bélisle was elected as Mayor of Gatineau in the 2021 mayoral election, becoming the city's first female mayor. However, on February 22, 2024, Bélisle announced that she would resign, citing a toxic work environment and having received death threats; Daniel Champagne was then named as acting mayor, pending the 2024 Gatineau mayoral by-election. The election was won by Maude Marquis-Bissonnette, retaking the city's top job for the party.

Since 2012, the political landscape in Gatineau had been made up of only one party, Action Gatineau, which had been founded in June of that year. The party, which was founded by Maxime Pedneaud-Jobin, then-city councillor for Buckingham District and later Mayor from 2013 to 2021, alongside fellow councillors Stefan Psenak, Mireille Appolon, André Laframboise and Luc Angers. Since its founding, the party has only ever held a minority of seats on city council. Various political figures have explored forming a second political party to go against Action Gatineau, such as Clément Bélanger, who placed fourth out of five candidates in the 2017 mayoral election in 2018, Mike Duggan, a longtime city councillor at various instances, and Audrey Bureau, city councillor for Aylmer District from 2017 to 2021 and daughter of former Mayor Marc Bureau in 2024. These attempts would not bear fruit to any new political parties, and in the case of Duggan, although he had initially reserved the party name Évolution Gatineau alongside 2017 mayoral candidate and former councillor for Bellevue District Sylvie Goneau in 2024 and received media coverage, as of September 2025, the party has yet to be formally founded.

By winter of 2025, two new political parties had seemingly been in the works: Équipe Mario Aubé, which was founded by the city councillor for Masson-Angers District since 2021, Mario Aubé, and the Coalition gatinoise pour les conseils d'arrondissement, which was to be led by Speaker of Gatineau City Council Steven Boivin and Edmond Leclerc, both the current city councillors for Aylmer District and Buckingham District, respectively. However, the latter party was never founded, as Boivin announced that he would be stepping away from politics and not seeking re-election.

=== Timeline ===
==== 2022 ====
- August 14 – Louise Boudrias, city councillor for Parc-de-la-Montagne–Saint-Raymond District, dies from complications with cancer.
- October 23 – Former mayor and city councillor for Wright–Parc-de-la-Montagne District, Marc Bureau, is elected in the by-election for Parc-de-la-Montagne–Saint-Raymond District, succeeding Louise Boudrias.

==== 2024 ====
- February 22 – Incumbent mayor France Bélisle announces that she will be resigning as Mayor effective immediately.
- April 25 – Olive Kamanyana, city councillor for Carrefour-de-l'Hôpital District, announces her resignation to run in the upcoming mayoral by-election.
- June 9 – Former city councillor for Plateau District and 2021 mayoral candidate Maude Marquis-Bissonnette of Action Gatineau wins the by-election for the mayoralty, and urban planner Catherine Craig-St-Louis of the same party wins the by-election for Carrefour-de-l'Hôpital District, succeeding Olive Kamanyana.
- November 7 – Mario Aubé, city councillor for Masson-Angers District, announces his candidacy for mayor.
- November 25 – Aubé announces he is collecting signatures to found a new political party.

==== 2025 ====
- January 13 – Équipe Mario Aubé is officially registered with Élections Québec.
- April 11 – Olive Kamanyana, former mayoral candidate and former city councillor for Carrefour-de-l'Hôpital District, announces her candidacy for mayor.
- May 10 – Action Gatineau holds their annual general meeting; leader Maude Marquis-Bissonnette passes a leadership review with 98.9% of the vote and is confirmed as the party's mayoral candidate.
- July 10 – Olive Kamanyana withdraws her candidacy for mayor.
- October 3 – The list of candidates for the election is finalized. Rémi Bergeron announces his candidacy.
- October 13 to 17 – Revision days for the list of electors.
- October 24 – Special ballot voting day.
- October 26 – Advance voting day.
- November 2 – Election day.

=== Incumbents not running for re-election ===
Party	Incumbent	Position	District	Date announced
Independent	Jocelyn Blondin	Councillor	Manoir-des-Trembles–Val-Tétreau	November 25, 2024
Independent	Stephen Boivin	Councillor	Aylmer	April 14, 2025
Independent	Marc Bureau	Councillor	Parc-de-la-Montagne–Saint-Raymond	May 6, 2025
Independent	Gilles Chagnon	Councillor	Lucerne	June 11, 2025
Independent	Daniel Champagne	Councillor	Versant	January 18, 2024
Action Gatineau	Anik Des Marais	Councillor	Mitigomijokan	April 2, 2025
Independent	Mike Duggan	Councillor	Pointe-Gatineau	May 13, 2025
Action Gatineau	Louis Sabourin	Councillor	Limbour	February 12, 2025

== Mayoral election ==
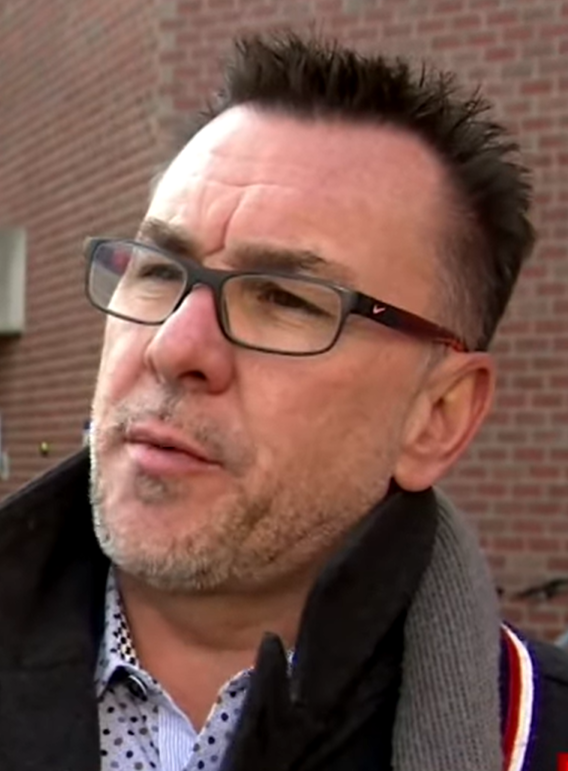
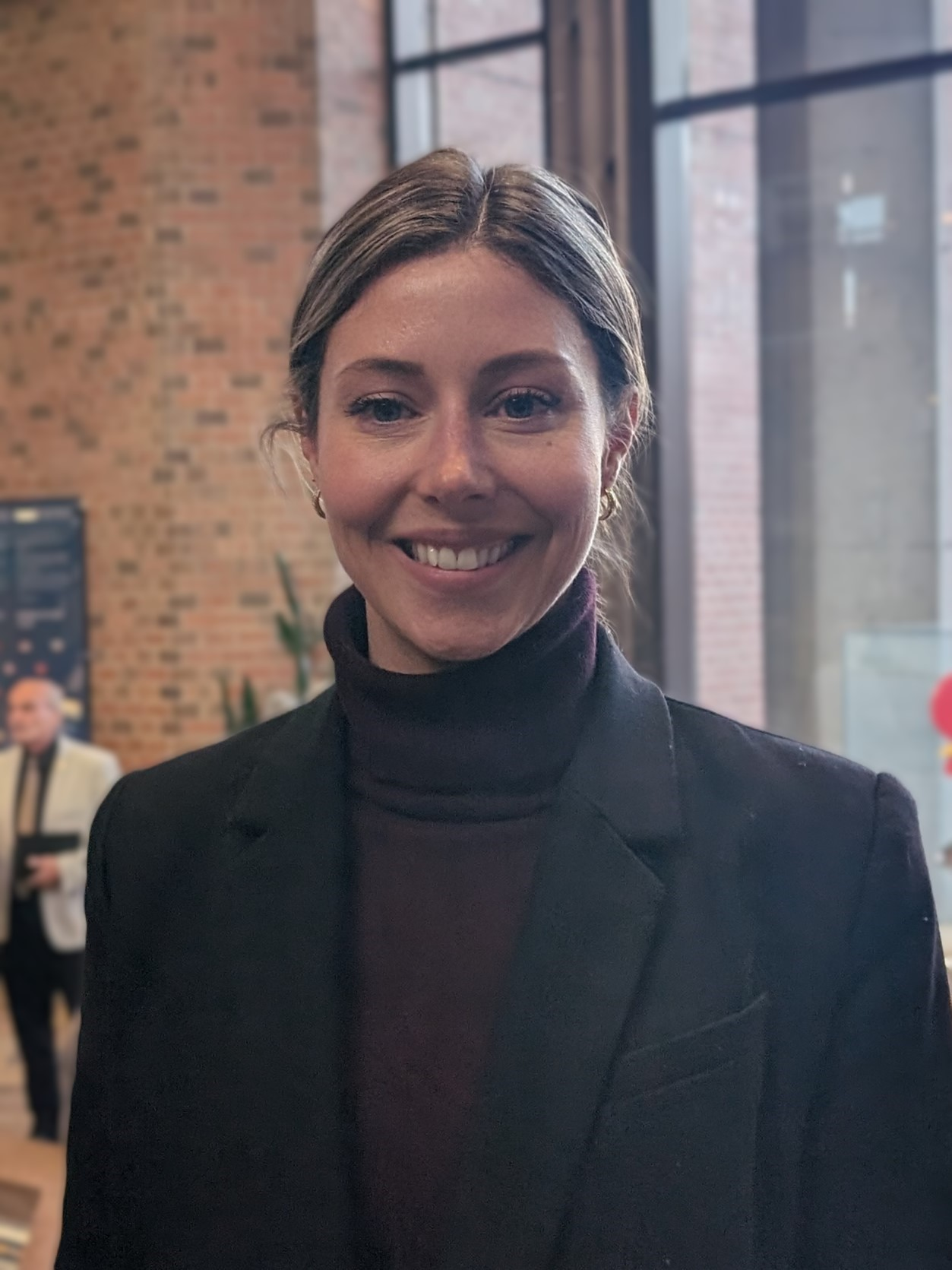
Candidates for the 2025 mayoral election. From left to right: Aubé, Marquis-Bissonnette.

=== Candidates ===
==== Declared ====
===== Mario Aubé =====
Mario Aubé is the city councillor for Masson-Angers District since 2021. Before being elected, he was a professor of journalism at Collège La Cité and hosted Que l’Outaouais se lève on 104.7 Outaouais.

Party affiliation: Équipe Mario Aubé
Candidacy announced: November 7, 2024
Campaign website: equipemarioaube.ca/equipe/mario-aube/

===== Rémi Bergeron =====
Rémi Bergeron is a high school teacher who was the general manager of Bowman, Quebec from 2016 to 2018 and a candidate for mayor in the 2017, 2021, and 2024 mayoral elections.

Party affiliation: Independent
Candidacy announced: October 3, 2025
Campaign website: N/A

===== Maude Marquis-Bissonnette =====
Maude Marquis-Bissonnette is the current Mayor of Gatineau, having been elected in the 2024 by-election. She was previously the city councillor for Plateau District from 2017 to 2021, and was the runner-up in the 2021 Gatineau municipal election. In between mandates, she became an associate professor at the École nationale d’administration publique. As the current leader of her political party, Action Gatineau, she had been expected to announce her candidacy for re-election.

Party affiliation: Action Gatineau
Candidacy announced: May 10, 2025
Campaign website: actiongatineau.org/equipe/maude-marquis-bissonnette/

==== Withdrawn ====
===== Olive Kamanyana =====
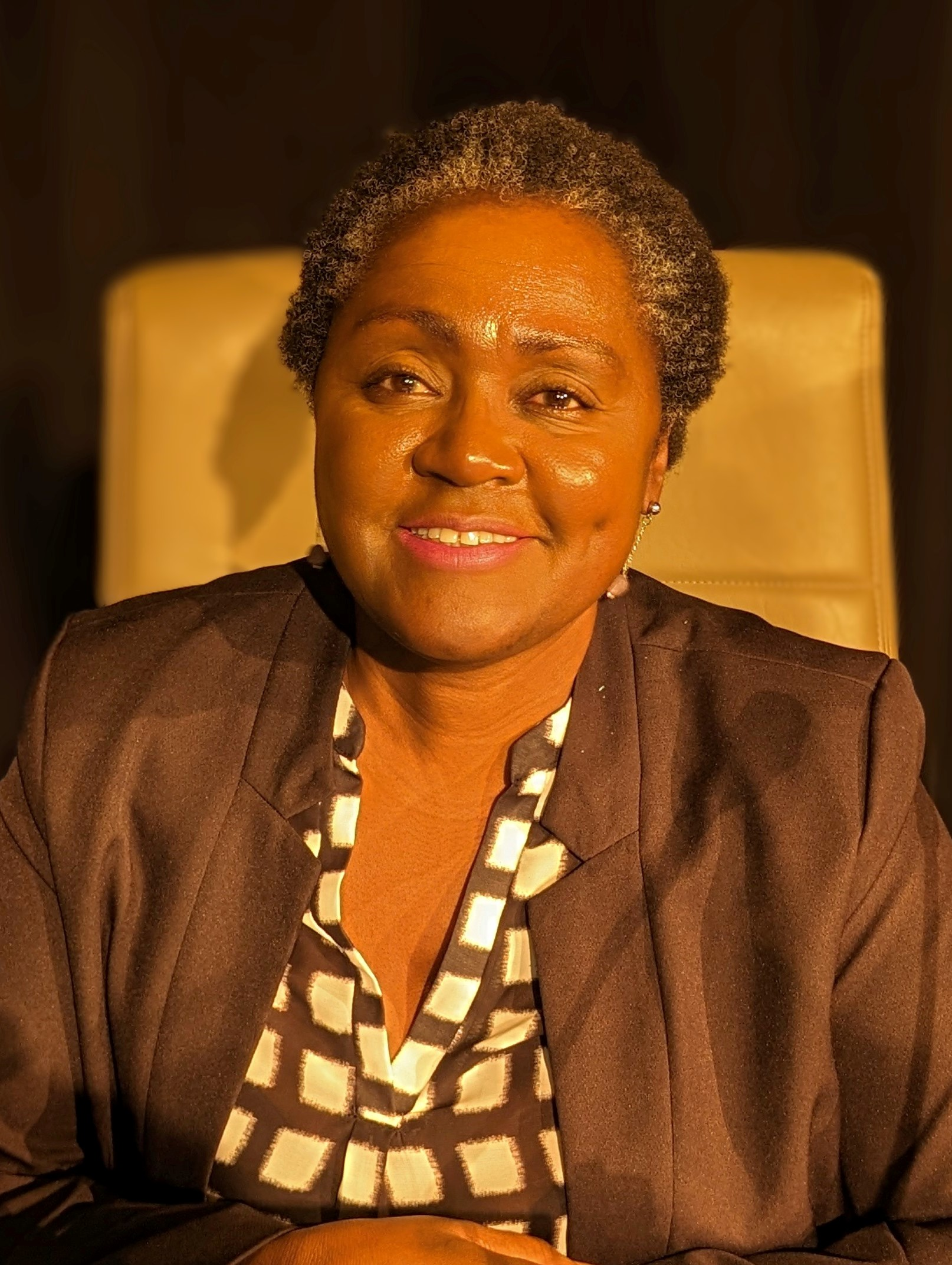
Kamanyana in 2024

Olive Kamanyana is the former city councillor for the Carrefour-de-l'Hôpital District, having been elected in the 2021 municipal election. She was also a candidate for the mayoralty in the 2024 by-election and the 2018 provincial Coalition Avenir Quebec candidate in Pontiac. Prior to entering politics, Kamanyana was a researcher, holding a PhD in Applied Social Sciences from Université du Québec en Outaouais and an MA and BA from Université Laval.

Party affiliation: Independent
Candidacy announced: April 11, 2025
Candidacy withdrawn: July 10, 2025
Campaign website: olivemairiegatineau.ca

==== Declined ====
- Stéphane Bisson, former president of the Gatineau Chamber of Commerce (2021–2024) and candidate for mayor in 2024
- Steven Boivin, speaker of the Gatineau City Council and city councillor for Aylmer District (2021–present)
- Daniel Feeny, former spokesperson and Director of Communications and Intergovernmental Relations to Mayor France Bélisle (2021–2024) and candidate for mayor in 2024

=== Endorsements ===
	Aubé	Bergeron	Marquis-Bissonnette	
City councillors	Gilles Chagnon; Mike Duggan; Jean Lessard		Bettyna Belizaire; Alicia Brunet-Lacasse; Catherine Craig-St-Louis; Anik Des Marais; Isabelle N. Miron; Steve Moran; Caroline Murray; Tiffany-Lee Norris Parent; Louis Sabourin	(Note: All councillors listed here are incumbent members of the same political party, and have appeared alongside Marquis-Bissonnette at various occasions during the campaign.)
Federal politicians				
Provincial politicians				
Former politicians				
Media				
Other			Mark Sutcliffe (Mayor of Ottawa)	

=== Debates and forums ===
Debates and forums among candidates for the 2025 Gatineau mayoral election
No.	Date	Location	Host	Language	Key: P Participant A Absent N Non-invitee I Invitee TBD To be determined O Out of race (not declared/withdrawn/disqualified)			References
No.	Date	Location	Host	Language	Mario Aubé	Bergeron	Marquis-Bissonnette	References
1	October 6, 2025	Aylmer	TROCAO	French	P	P	P	
2	October 7, 2025	Université du Québec en Outaouais	UQO; Le Droit	French	P	N	P	
3	October 20, 2025	Ottawa	ICI Ottawa-Gatineau	French	P	N	P	

=== Opinion polling ===
Polling firm	Source	Last date of polling	Sample Size (Note: Key: DV – decided voters AV – all voters)	MoE	Mario Aubé	Rémi Bergeron	Maude Marquis-Bissonnette	NOT/ UD/NV
Segma Recherche (Note: Commissioned by Le Droit and ICI Ottawa-Gatineau.)	HTML	October 23, 2025	687	± 3.7%	33.0%	2%	42.0%	23.0%
Segma Recherche (Note: Commissioned by 104.7 Outaouais and TVA Gatineau–Ottawa.)	VID	September 30, 2025	607	± 3.97%	27.0%	–	42.0%	31.0%

=== Results ===
2025 Gatineau municipal election: Mayor
Party	Candidate	Popular vote			Expenditures
Party	Candidate	Votes	%	±%	Expenditures
Action Gatineau	Maude Marquis-Bissonnette	41,569	51.14	+13.49	
Équipe Mario Aubé	Mario Aubé	38,203	47.00	–	
Independent	Rémi Bergeron	1,518	1.87	+0.82	
Total valid votes		81,290	98.82		
Total rejected, unmarked and declined votes		967	1.18	+0.62	
Turnout		82,257	40.27	+7.21	
Eligible voters		204 264			
Note: Candidate campaign colours, unless a member of a party, are based on the prominent colour used in campaign items (signs, literature, etc.) or colours used in polling graphs and are used as a visual differentiation between candidates.
Sources: Ville de Gatineau Elections Quebec

==== Detailed results ====
Results by district
District	Aubé		Bergeron		Marquis-Bissonnette	
District	Votes	%	Votes	%	Votes	%
Aylmer						
Lucerne						
Deschênes						
Plateau						
Mitigomijokan						
Manoir-des-Trembles–Val-Tétreau						
Hull–Wright						
Parc-de-la-Montagne–Saint-Raymond						
Orée-du-Parc						
Limbour						
Touraine						
Pointe-Gatineau						
Carrefour-de-l'Hôpital						
Versant						
Bellevue						
Lac-Beauchamp						
Rivière-Blanche						
Masson-Angers						
Buckingham						
Special Advanced Voting (Note: Voters who vote in the special advance voting, held at the official elections office, come from across the city and are thus labelled in their own category.)						
Total						

== City council elections ==
Summary of the 2025 Gatineau municipal election
Party	Party leader	Candidates (Note: Not including candidates for mayor.)	Seats					Popular vote			
Party	Party leader	Candidates	2021	Dissol.	2025	Change from 2021	% seats	Votes	Vote change	%	pp change
Action Gatineau	Maude Marquis-Bissonnette	19	8	9	11	▲3	57.89%	38,365	▲11,779	47.48%	▲8.83
Équipe Mario Aubé	Mario Aubé	19	New	2	7	New	36.84%	36,743	New	45.48%	New
Independent		8	11	8	1	▼10	5.26%	5,687	▼36,508	7.04%	▼54.31
Vacant				0	—N/a						
Total valid votes								80,795	▲12,014	98.21%	
Total rejected ballots								1,474	▲291	1.79%	▲0.10
Total		46	19	19	19	–	100.00%	82,269	▲12,305	100.00%	–
Eligible voters/turnout								204,264		40.28%	

=== Aylmer District ===
Incumbent Independent city councillor Steven Boivin was elected in 2021 with 56.69% of the vote. He previously showed interest in running in the 2024 Gatineau mayoral by-election, but withdrew from consideration. He has announced that he will not seek re-election.

Nominated candidates

- Guillaume Gaboury (ÉMA), real estate developer
- Vincent Roy (AG), policy advisor to Mayor Maude Marquis-Bissonnette

2025 Gatineau municipal election: Aylmer
Party	Candidate	Popular vote			Expenditures
Party	Candidate	Votes	%	±%	Expenditures
Action Gatineau	Vincent Roy	2,298	64.62	–	
Équipe Mario Aubé	Guillaume Gaboury	1,258	35.38	–	
Total valid votes		3,643	96.86		
Total rejected, unmarked and declined votes		118	3.14		
Turnout		3,761			
Eligible voters					
Note: Candidate campaign colours, unless a member of a party, are based on the prominent colour used in campaign items (signs, literature, etc.) or colours used in polling graphs and are used as a visual differentiation between candidates.
Sources: Ville de Gatineau

=== Lucerne District ===
Incumbent Independent city councillor Gilles Chagnon was re-elected in 2021 with 67.39% of the vote. He has announced that he would not seek re-election and endorsed Équipe Mario Aubé in the election.

Nominated candidates

- Sonia Ben-Arfa (AG), non-profit project coordinator
- Michel Lamirande (ÉMA), Royal Bank of Canada analyst

2025 Gatineau municipal election: Lucerne
Party	Candidate	Popular vote			Expenditures
Party	Candidate	Votes	%	±%	Expenditures
Action Gatineau	Sonia Ben-Arfa	2,457	57.33	–	
Équipe Mario Aubé	Michel Lamirande	1,829	42.67	–	
Total valid votes		4,381	97.16		
Total rejected, unmarked and declined votes		128	2.84		
Turnout		4,509			
Eligible voters					
Note: Candidate campaign colours, unless a member of a party, are based on the prominent colour used in campaign items (signs, literature, etc.) or colours used in polling graphs and are used as a visual differentiation between candidates.
Sources: Ville de Gatineau

=== Deschênes District ===
Incumbent Action Gatineau city councillor Caroline Murray was elected in 2021 with 54.92% of the vote. She has announced she will be seeking re-election.

Nominated candidates

- Marie Rose Dione (ÉMA), businesswoman
- Daniel Godin (Independent), former president of the Deschênes Community Association
- Caroline Murray (AG), incumbent city councillor

,,

2025 Gatineau municipal election: Deschênes
Party	Candidate	Popular vote			Expenditures
Party	Candidate	Votes	%	±%	Expenditures
Action Gatineau	Caroline Murray	2,665	67.45	+12.53	
Équipe Mario Aubé	Marie Rose Dione	1,019	25.79	–	
Independent	Daniel Godin	267	6.76	–	
Total valid votes		3,998	98.09		
Total rejected, unmarked and declined votes		78	1.91		
Turnout		4,076			
Eligible voters					
Note: Candidate campaign colours, unless a member of a party, are based on the prominent colour used in campaign items (signs, literature, etc.) or colours used in polling graphs and are used as a visual differentiation between candidates.
Sources: Ville de Gatineau

=== Plateau District ===
Incumbent Action Gatineau city councillor Bettyna Belizaire was elected in 2021 with 61.42% of the vote. She has announced she will be seeking re-election.

Nominated candidates

- Bettyna Belizaire (AG), incumbent city councillor
- Shomba Lomami (ÉMA), human relations officer at the Outaouais Integrated Health and Social Services Centre

2025 Gatineau municipal election: Plateau
Party	Candidate	Popular vote			Expenditures
Party	Candidate	Votes	%	±%	Expenditures
Action Gatineau	Bettyna Belizaire	3,029	68.92	+7.50	
Équipe Mario Aubé	Shomba Lomami	1,366	31.08	–	
Total valid votes		4,488	97.27		
Total rejected, unmarked and declined votes		126	2.73		
Turnout		4,614			
Eligible voters					
Note: Candidate campaign colours, unless a member of a party, are based on the prominent colour used in campaign items (signs, literature, etc.) or colours used in polling graphs and are used as a visual differentiation between candidates.
Sources: Ville de Gatineau

=== Mitigomijokan District ===
Incumbent Action Gatineau city councillor Anik Des Marais was elected in 2021 with 40.40% of the vote. She has announced that she will not seek re-election.

Nominated candidates

- Mark Buzan (Independent), non-profit consultant; former Conservative Party of Quebec regional vice-president and ADQ candidate for Hull in 1998
- Rachel Cousineau (ÉMA), manager at Indigenous Services Canada
- Rachel Deslauriers (AG), senior manager at the Federation of Canadian Municipalities

2025 Gatineau municipal election: Mitigomijokan
Party	Candidate	Popular vote			Expenditures
Party	Candidate	Votes	%	±%	Expenditures
Action Gatineau	Rachel Deslauriers	2,244	56.17	–	
Équipe Mario Aubé	Rachel Cousineau	1,178	29.49	–	
Independent	Mark Buzan	573	14.34	–	
Total valid votes		4,052	97.80		
Total rejected, unmarked and declined votes		91	2.20		
Turnout		4,143			
Eligible voters					
Note: Candidate campaign colours, unless a member of a party, are based on the prominent colour used in campaign items (signs, literature, etc.) or colours used in polling graphs and are used as a visual differentiation between candidates.
Sources: Ville de Gatineau

=== Manoir-des-Trembles–Val-Tétreau District ===
Incumbent Independent city councillor Jocelyn Blondin was re-elected in 2021 with 55.30% of the vote. He has announced that he will not seek re-election, and endorsed Joseph Soares and Équipe Mario Aubé to succeed him. Soares withdrew on June 7, 2025, and was replaced by Serge Cazelais.

Nominated candidates

- Serge Cazelais (ÉMA), historian and former professor at Saint Paul University
- Adrian Corbo (AG), president of the Fondation Forêt-Boucher, primary school teacher and candidate for Parc-de-la-Montagne–Saint-Raymond District in 2013

Withdrew

- Joseph Soares (ÉMA), consultant, former federal civil servant and candidate for Wright–Parc-de-la-Montagne District in 2005 (previously ran as an Independent)

2025 Gatineau municipal election: Manoir-des-Trembles–Val-Tétreau
Party	Candidate	Popular vote			Expenditures
Party	Candidate	Votes	%	±%	Expenditures
Action Gatineau	Adrian Corbo	2,889	72.62	–	
Équipe Mario Aubé	Serge Cazelais	1,089	27.38	–	
Total valid votes		4,084	96.80		
Total rejected, unmarked and declined votes		135	3.20		
Turnout		4,219			
Eligible voters					
Note: Candidate campaign colours, unless a member of a party, are based on the prominent colour used in campaign items (signs, literature, etc.) or colours used in polling graphs and are used as a visual differentiation between candidates.
Sources: Ville de Gatineau

=== Hull–Wright District ===
Incumbent Action Gatineau city councillor Steve Moran was elected in 2021 with 48.57% of the vote. He has announced he will be seeking re-election.

Nominated candidates

- Daniel Gislain Dikoume Dikoume (Independent), federal public servant
- Steve Moran (AG), incumbent city councillor and former interim leader of Action Gatineau (2021–2024)
- Éric Pilotte-Savoie (ÉMA), former executive assistant to then-Mayor France Bélisle

2025 Gatineau municipal election: Hull–Wright
Party	Candidate	Popular vote			Expenditures
Party	Candidate	Votes	%	±%	Expenditures
Action Gatineau	Steve Moran	1,904	62.51	+13.94	
Équipe Mario Aubé	Éric Pilotte-Savoie	987	32.40	–	
Independent	Daniel Gislain Dikoume Dikoume	155	5.09	–	
Total valid votes		3,115	96.92		
Total rejected, unmarked and declined votes		99	3.08		
Turnout		3,214			
Eligible voters					
Note: Candidate campaign colours, unless a member of a party, are based on the prominent colour used in campaign items (signs, literature, etc.) or colours used in polling graphs and are used as a visual differentiation between candidates.
Sources: Ville de Gatineau

=== Parc-de-la-Montagne–Saint-Raymond District ===
Incumbent Independent city councillor and former mayor Marc Bureau was elected to the seat in a by-election on October 23, 2022, after his predecessor, Louise Boudrias, died on August 14, 2022, following complications with cancer. He has announced he will not be seeking re-election.

Nominated candidates

- Isabelle Cousineau (AG), policy analyst at the Ministry of Health and Social Services
- Serge Lafortune (Independent), executive assistant to incumbent councillor Marc Bureau
- Ernesto Marin-Nunez (ÉMA), assistant administrator at Crown–Indigenous Relations and Northern Affairs Canada

2025 Gatineau municipal election: Parc-de-la-Montagne–Saint-Raymond
Party	Candidate	Popular vote			Expenditures
Party	Candidate	Votes	%	±%	Expenditures
Action Gatineau	Isabelle Cousineau	1,826	49.28	–	
Équipe Mario Aubé	Ernesto Marin-Nunez	991	26.75	–	
Independent	Serge Lafortune	888	23.97	–	
Total valid votes		3,762	97.74		
Total rejected, unmarked and declined votes		87	2.26		
Turnout		3,849			
Eligible voters					
Note: Candidate campaign colours, unless a member of a party, are based on the prominent colour used in campaign items (signs, literature, etc.) or colours used in polling graphs and are used as a visual differentiation between candidates.
Sources: Ville de Gatineau

=== Orée-du-Parc District ===
Incumbent Action Gatineau city councillor Isabelle N. Miron was re-elected in 2021 with 61.95% of the vote. She has announced she will be seeking re-election.

Nominated candidates

- Vicki Laframboise (ÉMA), orthophonist
- Isabelle N. Miron (AG), incumbent city councillor

2025 Gatineau municipal election: Orée-du-Parc
Party	Candidate	Popular vote			Expenditures
Party	Candidate	Votes	%	±%	Expenditures
Action Gatineau	Isabelle N. Miron	2,576	56.64	-5.31	
Équipe Mario Aubé	Vicki Laframboise	1,972	43.36	–	
Total valid votes		4,614	97.92		
Total rejected, unmarked and declined votes		98	2.08		
Turnout		4,712			
Eligible voters					
Note: Candidate campaign colours, unless a member of a party, are based on the prominent colour used in campaign items (signs, literature, etc.) or colours used in polling graphs and are used as a visual differentiation between candidates.
Sources: Ville de Gatineau

=== Limbour District ===
Incumbent Action Gatineau city councillor Louis Sabourin was elected in 2021 with 41.88% of the vote. He has announced he will not seek re-election.

Nominated candidates

- Julie Bélisle (ÉMA), federal public servant
- Dérik Maltais (AG), advisor for the Office of the Chief Government Whip and Independent runner-up for this district in 2021

2025 Gatineau municipal election: Limbour
Party	Candidate	Popular vote			Expenditures
Party	Candidate	Votes	%	±%	Expenditures
Équipe Mario Aubé	Julie Bélisle	3,020	51.66	–	
Action Gatineau	Dérik Maltais	2,826	48.34	+11.70	
Total valid votes		5,906	98.43		
Total rejected, unmarked and declined votes		94	1.57		
Turnout		6,000			
Eligible voters					
Note: Candidate campaign colours, unless a member of a party, are based on the prominent colour used in campaign items (signs, literature, etc.) or colours used in polling graphs and are used as a visual differentiation between candidates.
Sources: Ville de Gatineau

=== Touraine District ===
Incumbent Action Gatineau city councillor Tiffany-Lee Norris Parent was elected in 2021 with 38.43% of the vote. She has announced she will be seeking re-election.

Nominated candidates

- Paul Loyer (ÉMA), school board trustee for the Centre de services scolaire des Draveurs (2020–present); former school board trustee for the Commission scolaire des Draveurs (2007–2020)
- Tiffany-Lee Norris Parent (AG), incumbent city councillor

Withdrew

- Ève Karat (ÉMA), businesswoman

2025 Gatineau municipal election: Touraine
Party	Candidate	Popular vote			Expenditures
Party	Candidate	Votes	%	±%	Expenditures
Action Gatineau	Tiffany-Lee Norris Parent	2,068	51.18	+12.75	
Équipe Mario Aubé	Paul Loyer	1,973	48.82	–	
Total valid votes		4,127	97.27		
Total rejected, unmarked and declined votes		116	2.73		
Turnout		4,243			
Eligible voters					
Note: Candidate campaign colours, unless a member of a party, are based on the prominent colour used in campaign items (signs, literature, etc.) or colours used in polling graphs and are used as a visual differentiation between candidates.
Sources: Ville de Gatineau

=== Pointe-Gatineau District ===
Incumbent Independent city councillor Mike Duggan was elected in 2021 with 51.40% of the vote. He has announced he will not be seeking re-election.

Nominated candidates

- Marc Carrière (ÉMA), former city councillor for Masson-Angers District (2013–2021) and Conservative Party of Quebec candidate for Papineau in 2022
- Louis Laurier (Independent), freelancer
- Nicolas Payette-Prévost (AG), manager at the Canadian Judicial Council

2025 Gatineau municipal election: Pointe-Gatineau
Party	Candidate	Popular vote			Expenditures
Party	Candidate	Votes	%	±%	Expenditures
Équipe Mario Aubé	Marc Carrière	1,612	51.04	–	
Action Gatineau	Nicolas Payette-Prévost	1,251	39.61	–	
Independent	Louis Laurier	295	9.34	–	
Total valid votes		3,223	97.14		
Total rejected, unmarked and declined votes		95	2.86		
Turnout		3,318			
Eligible voters					
Note: Candidate campaign colours, unless a member of a party, are based on the prominent colour used in campaign items (signs, literature, etc.) or colours used in polling graphs and are used as a visual differentiation between candidates.
Sources: Ville de Gatineau

=== Carrefour-de-l'Hôpital District ===
Incumbent Action Gatineau city councillor Catherine Craig-St-Louis was elected to the seat in a by-election on June 9, 2024, after her predecessor, Olive Kamanyana, resigned her seat to participate in the 2024 Gatineau mayoral by-election. She has announced she will be seeking re-election.

Nominated candidates

- Catherine Craig-St-Louis (AG), incumbent city councillor
- Marie-Pier Lacroix (ÉMA), community worker and Independent candidate in this district in 2024

2025 Gatineau municipal election: Carrefour-de-l'Hôpital
Party	Candidate	Popular vote			Expenditures
Party	Candidate	Votes	%	±%	Expenditures
Action Gatineau	Catherine Craig-St-Louis	2,319	54.97	–	
Équipe Mario Aubé	Marie-Pier Lacroix	1,900	45.03	–	
Total valid votes		4,290	97.74		
Total rejected, unmarked and declined votes		99	2.26		
Turnout		4,389			
Eligible voters					
Note: Candidate campaign colours, unless a member of a party, are based on the prominent colour used in campaign items (signs, literature, etc.) or colours used in polling graphs and are used as a visual differentiation between candidates.
Sources: Ville de Gatineau

=== Versant District ===
Incumbent Independent city councillor Daniel Champagne was re-elected in 2021 with 72.30% of the vote. He has announced that he will not be seeking re-election. He has endorsed Sophie Lamothe of Action Gatineau to succeed him.

Nominated candidates

- Sophie Lamothe (AG), architect
- Luc Chénier (ÉMA), sports commentator for 104.7 Outaouais and former defenceman for the Gatineau Olympiques

2025 Gatineau municipal election: Versant
Party	Candidate	Popular vote			Expenditures
Party	Candidate	Votes	%	±%	Expenditures
Équipe Mario Aubé	Luc Chénier	2,916	57.42	–	
Action Gatineau	Sophie Lamothe	2,162	42.58	–	
Total valid votes		5,143	98.15		
Total rejected, unmarked and declined votes		97	1.85		
Turnout		5,240			
Eligible voters					
Note: Candidate campaign colours, unless a member of a party, are based on the prominent colour used in campaign items (signs, literature, etc.) or colours used in polling graphs and are used as a visual differentiation between candidates.
Sources: Ville de Gatineau

=== Bellevue District ===
Incumbent Action Gatineau city councillor Alicia Brunet-Lacasse was elected in 2021 with 41.78% of the vote. The party has announced that she will be seeking re-election.

Nominated candidates

- Chloé Bourgeois (ÉMA), actress and comedian
- Alicia Brunet-Lacasse (AG), incumbent city councillor

2025 Gatineau municipal election: Bellevue
Party	Candidate	Popular vote			Expenditures
Party	Candidate	Votes	%	±%	Expenditures
Équipe Mario Aubé	Chloé Bourgeois	2,891	56.92	–	
Action Gatineau	Alicia Brunet-Lacasse	2,188	43.08	+1.30	
Total valid votes		5,185	97.35		
Total rejected, unmarked and declined votes		141	2.65		
Turnout		5,326			
Eligible voters					
Note: Candidate campaign colours, unless a member of a party, are based on the prominent colour used in campaign items (signs, literature, etc.) or colours used in polling graphs and are used as a visual differentiation between candidates.
Sources: Ville de Gatineau

=== Lac-Beauchamp District ===
Incumbent Independent city councillor Denis Girouard was elected in 2021 with 56.76% of the vote. He previously showed interest in running in the 2024 Gatineau mayoral by-election, but withdrew himself from consideration. He has announced that he will be seeking re-election.

Nominated candidates

- Denis Girouard (Independent), incumbent city councillor
- Timmy Jutras (ÉMA), assistant to Liberal MP Stéphane Lauzon
- Anne-Marie Meunier (Independent), music producer
- Richard Nadeau (AG), former Bloc Québécois MP for Gatineau (2006–2011) and father of former city councillor for Pointe-Gatineau District Myriam Nadeau

2025 Gatineau municipal election: Lac-Beauchamp
Party	Candidate	Popular vote			Expenditures
Party	Candidate	Votes	%	±%	Expenditures
Équipe Mario Aubé	Timmy Jutras	2,122	57.10	–	
Action Gatineau	Richard Nadeau	959	25.81	–	
Independent	Denis Girouard	466	12.54	-44.22	
Independent	Anne-Marie Meunier	169	4.55	–	
Total valid votes		3,783	97.42		
Total rejected, unmarked and declined votes		100	2.58		
Turnout		3,883			
Eligible voters					
Note: Candidate campaign colours, unless a member of a party, are based on the prominent colour used in campaign items (signs, literature, etc.) or colours used in polling graphs and are used as a visual differentiation between candidates.
Sources: Ville de Gatineau

=== Rivière-Blanche District ===
In 2021, incumbent Équipe Mario Aubé city councillor Jean Lessard was re-elected with 73.36% of the vote. Lessard had been an Independent until March 10, 2025, when he announced that he was joining the new political party formed by fellow city councillor Mario Aubé. He has announced that he will seek re-election.

Nominated candidates

- Jean Lessard (ÉMA), incumbent city councillor
- Frédéric Morin-Paquette (AG), primary school teacher

2025 Gatineau municipal election: Rivière-Blanche
Party	Candidate	Popular vote			Expenditures
Party	Candidate	Votes	%	±%	Expenditures
Équipe Mario Aubé	Jean Lessard	3,266	68.34	-5.02	
Action Gatineau	Frédéric Morin-Paquette	1,513	31.66	–	
Total valid votes		4,879	97.31		
Total rejected, unmarked and declined votes		135	2.69		
Turnout		5,014			
Eligible voters					
Note: Candidate campaign colours, unless a member of a party, are based on the prominent colour used in campaign items (signs, literature, etc.) or colours used in polling graphs and are used as a visual differentiation between candidates.
Sources: Ville de Gatineau

=== Masson-Angers District ===
Incumbent Équipe Mario Aubé city councillor Mario Aubé was elected in 2021 with 60.49% of the vote. He originally indicated his intention to seek re-election as an Independent, but later announced that he would be running for mayor.

Nominated candidates

- Michael Korhonen (ÉMA), federal civil servant with the Department of National Defence
- Charles-Henri Lepage-Roy (AG), non-profit worker

2025 Gatineau municipal election: Masson-Angers
Party	Candidate	Popular vote			Expenditures
Party	Candidate	Votes	%	±%	Expenditures
Équipe Mario Aubé	Michael Korhonen	3,774	80.42	–	
Action Gatineau	Charles-Henri Lepage-Roy	919	19.58	–	
Total valid votes		4,813	96.88		
Total rejected, unmarked and declined votes		155	3.12		
Turnout		4,968			
Eligible voters					
Note: Candidate campaign colours, unless a member of a party, are based on the prominent colour used in campaign items (signs, literature, etc.) or colours used in polling graphs and are used as a visual differentiation between candidates.
Sources: Ville de Gatineau

=== Buckingham District ===
Incumbent Independent city councillor Edmond Leclerc was elected in 2021 with 57.52% of the vote. He has announced that he will be seeking re-election.

Nominated candidates

- Edmond Leclerc (Independent), incumbent city councillor
- Mike Owen Sebazengi (AG), executive director of Action Gatineau and Québec solidaire candidate for Pontiac in 2022
- Sylvain Tremblay (ÉMA), former school board trustee for the Commission scolaire au Cœur-des-Vallées (2013–2020) and candidate for Masson-Angers District in 2021

2025 Gatineau municipal election: Buckingham
Party	Candidate	Popular vote			Expenditures
Party	Candidate	Votes	%	±%	Expenditures
Independent	Edmond Leclerc	2,874	60.81	+3.29	
Action Gatineau	Mike Owen Sebazengi	272	5.76	–	
Équipe Mario Aubé	Sylvain Tremblay	1,580	33.43	–	
Total valid votes		4,783	98.13		
Total rejected, unmarked and declined votes		91	1.87		
Turnout		4,874			
Eligible voters					
Note: Candidate campaign colours, unless a member of a party, are based on the prominent colour used in campaign items (signs, literature, etc.) or colours used in polling graphs and are used as a visual differentiation between candidates.
