= Deschênes, Quebec =

Former municipality in Quebec

Deschênes is a former municipality in Quebec, Canada, located in the Outaouais region. Along with Lucerne, it was a part of the municipality of Aylmer in 1975, itself amalgamated into the City of Gatineau in 2002. Originally, the name of the village was Deschênes Mills.

== History ==
Traces of human presence dating from 6-8000 years before today have been found in the Ottawa Valley (Outaouais region). Around 500 BC the population known as the Algonquin (Anishinàbeg) people is established, whose territory will span the length of the Kichi Zibi River (the Great or Grand River), known today as the Ottawa River.

In 1610, Samuel de Champlain sent Nicolas de Vignau on a mission to learn the Algonquin language. Vignau travelled up the river and spent a year with the Indigenous inhabitants. He became the second European to pass by the Deschênes rapids - Étienne Brûlé was the first. In his passage that led him towards the Mattawa River and the French River to finally reach Lake Huron and the land of the First Nation called the Odawa (Odàwà). As a result of the trade established with this First Nation, which continued throughout the 17th century, the name Ottawa (written variably as 8ta8ois, Utawàs, and more recently, Outaouais) became attached to the river by the French, even though these Indigenous people never lived in the Valley.

It is Pierre de Troyes, a commander of Pierre Le Moyne d'Iberville's expedition, who would first write the French name Deschênes. The French name was a translation of the Algonquin name Mitigomijokan (meaning the place of the oak), it is what de Troyes was told on his journey on April 23, 1686. This site was the third portage or "upper portage of the Chaudière" which leads upstream to the widening of the river, then called lac Chaudière or Chaudière Lake (today called lac Deschênes ). Having passed through the rapids, de Troyes must have seen the impressive forest of oaks and writes that the area of the portage is called des chesnes (oak is chêne, in French).

In 1800, the first permanent settlers in the Ottawa Valley arrived with Philemon Wright and his family and begin to build Wright's Town, Lower Canada at the Chaudière Falls. Two years later, upriver and in what would become the Deschênes area, 35-year-old James McConnell from Prince Edward Island settled along with his two brothers, William (17) and George (10) The McConnells were part of the second wave of permanent settlers in the farming community of Philemon Wright. According to the surveys of Theodore Davis and the register of Philemon Wright, James McConnell would occupy lot 14-a of the first range. A while later, his brother William cleared a farm on the neighbouring lot 13 of the first range.

In 1810, James McConnell leased lot 15 of the first range, cleared the land for agriculture and excavated a mill run to what was to be the first mill, thus marking the very beginning of the village of Deschênes Mills.

Eleven years later, a store is in operation near the rapids. The McConnell brothers would make their fortunes in the timber industry, as farmers, and in the petty fur trade - taking over the petty fur trade business established by failed trader Ithamar Day in 1826.

Merchant Robert Conroy (politician) and his wife Mary, daughter of William McConnell, settled in Aylmer in 1837 and built the British Hotel. They invested heavily in this region in the development of transportation services, timber slides, landings, the macadamized Aylmer road, bridges and stagecoach services.

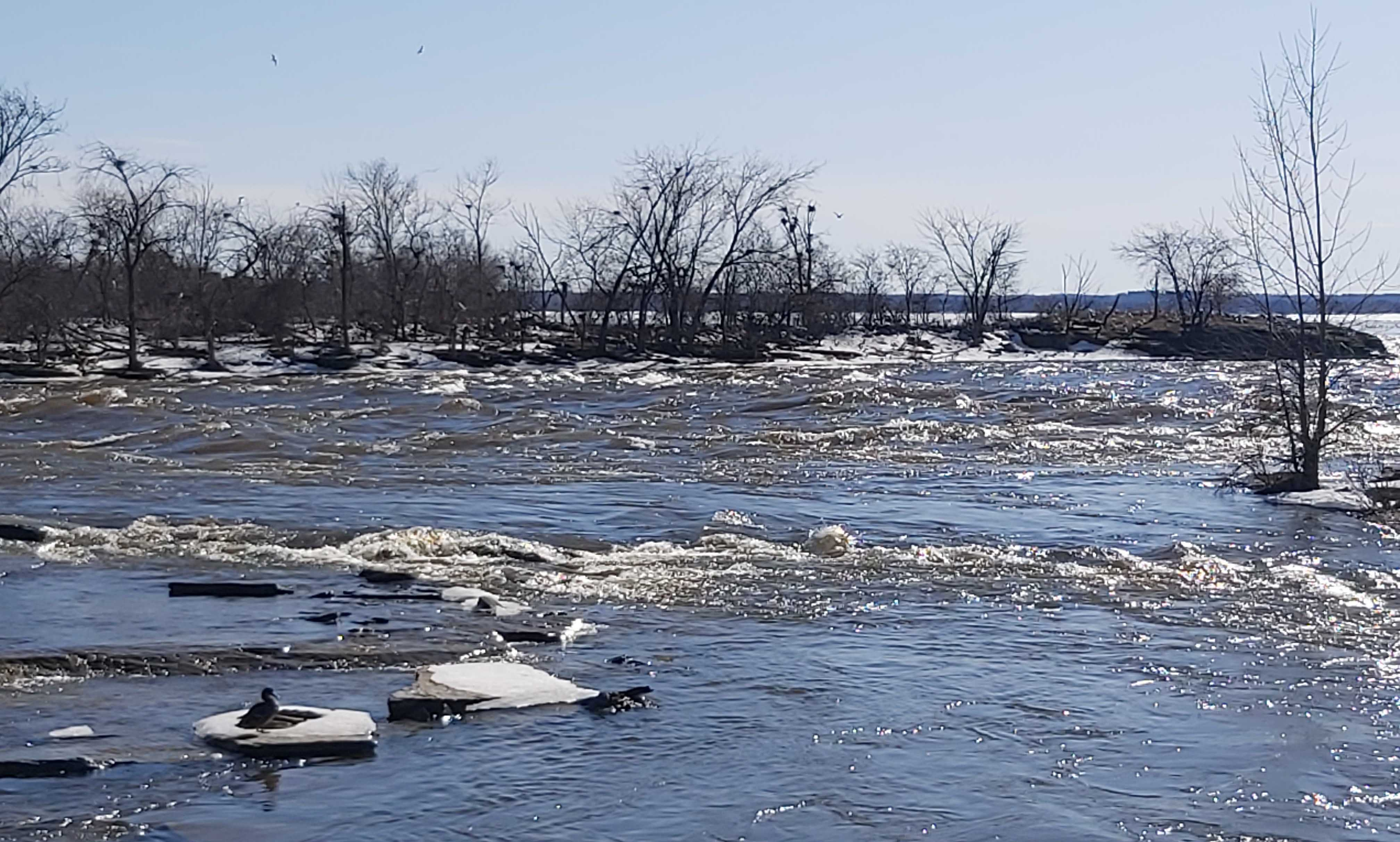
Île Conroy 21 mars 2021

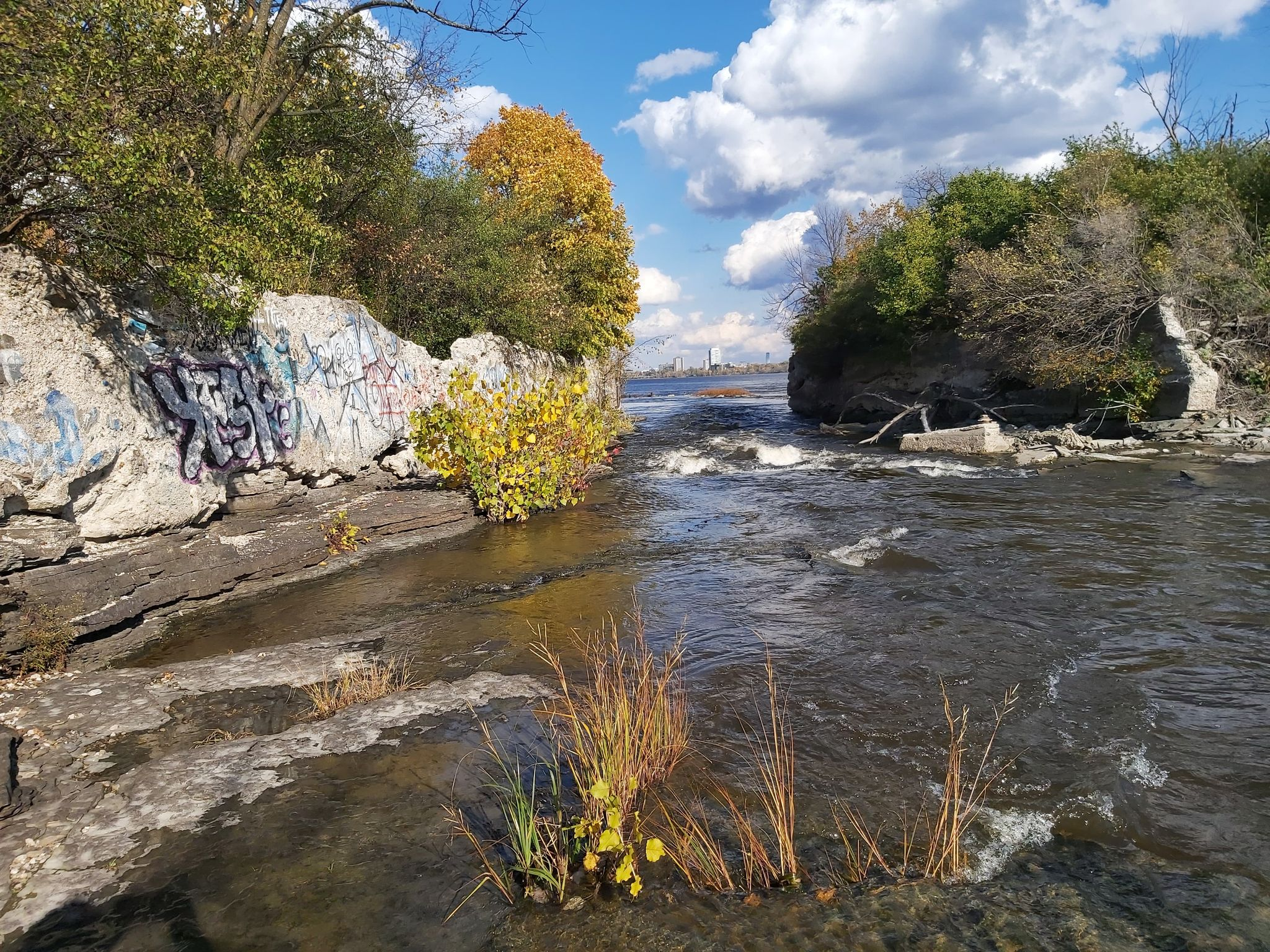
Ruines de Deschênes 2020

In 1857, Mary Conroy bought a farm near the Deschênes rapids and transformed it into one of the most prosperous dairy farms in the Outaouais. Her husband died in 1868 and she took over the management of the family businesses, a rarity at that time for a woman. She modernized their sawmill and built a second one which produced nearly 30 million board feet in one season. Two hundred sawmill workers settled in the village of Deschênes Mills building up in Lots 15 and 16 along the Ottawa River near the rapids.

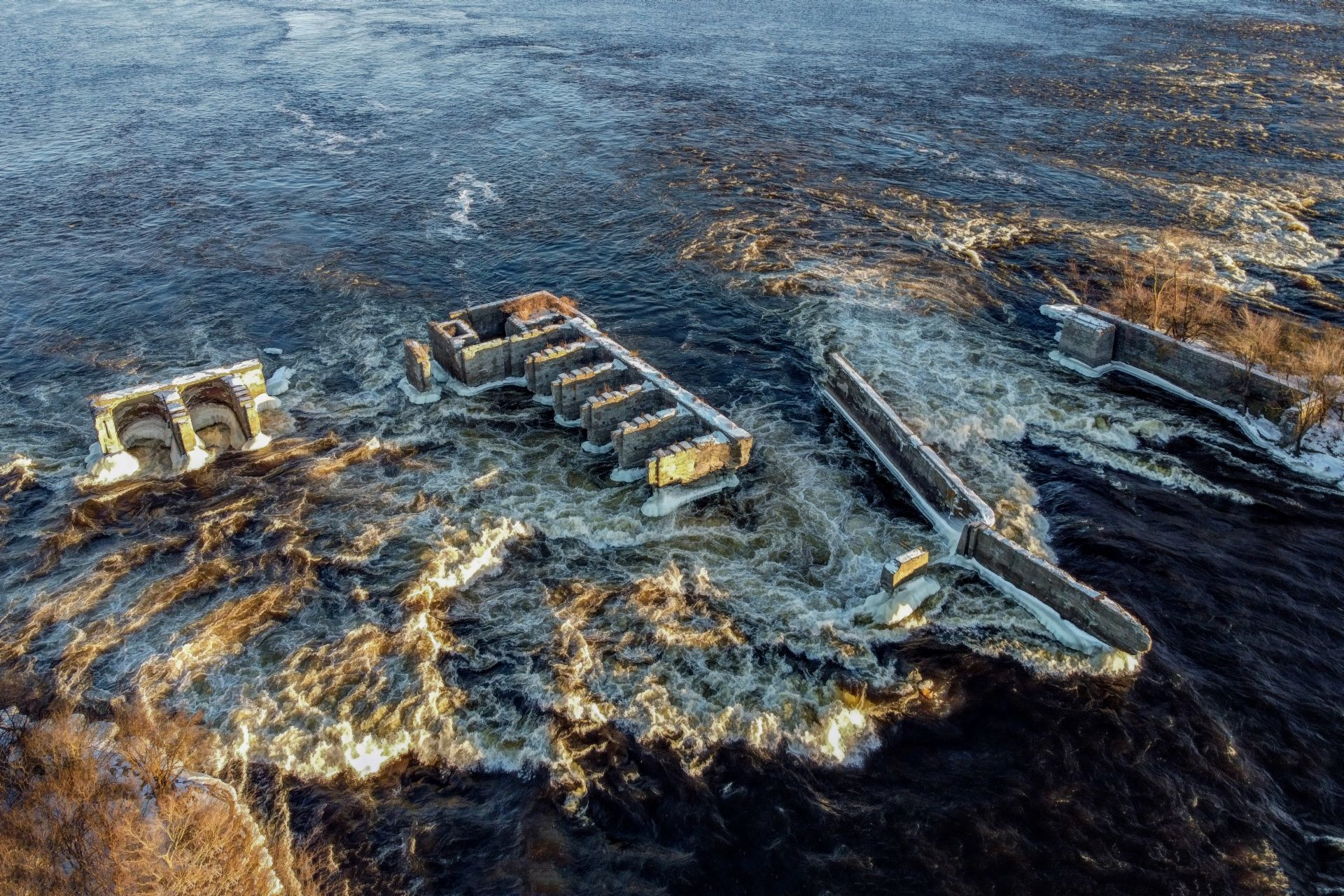
Ruines Deschênes vues des airs

On the death of their mother, the management of the family businesses was placed in the hands of her ten children. Two of the boys, Robert and William Conroy, built one of the two hydroelectric power stations at the Deschênes rapids, the Deschênes Electric Company (1896-1946). The second one was built by the Hull Electric Company A large stone building, built by this second company for use as a shed and repair garage for streetcars, still exists at the corner of Vanier Road and Lucerne Boulevard. These two plants supplied the surrounding neighbourhoods, the factories, and the tramway linking Hull & Ottawa to Aylmer. The ruins of these dams are still present.

The British American Nickel Corporation nickel refinery (1916 – 1923) was built during the Great War by James Hamet Dunn, and quickly became the most efficient refinery in Canada. For some unknown reason, Prime Minister William Lyon Mackenzie King ordered it closed in 1923. Its ruins stood until 1985.

The village of Deschênes was incorporated in 1920 and the Catholic parish of Saint-Médard was promulgated in 1923. Following the departure of industries, the village is transformed into a resort for people from Hull and Ottawa but gradually the chalets would be winterized or replaced by habitable year-round homes. In the wake of the policy of regrouping the municipalities of Quebec, the villages of Aylmer, Lucerne and Deschênes were merged on January 1, 1975, to become the municipality of Aylmer. On 1 January 2002, it is itself attached to the municipality of Gatineau where Deschênes became a district with its own municipal councillor.
