= Mike Duggan (Canadian politician) =

City councillor from Gatineau, Quebec

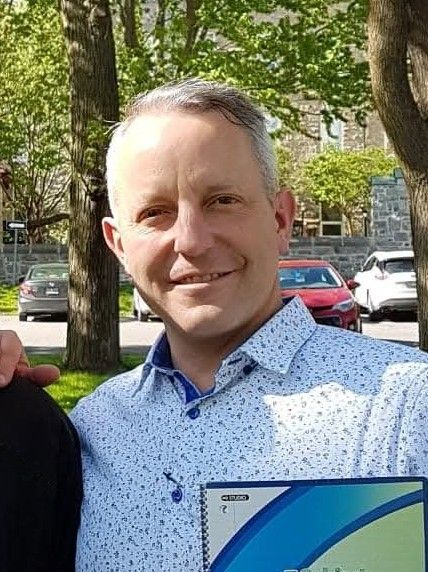
- Duggan in 2019

Gatineau City Councillor
- In office November 7, 2021 – November 2, 2025
- Preceded by: Gilles Carpentier
- Succeeded by: Marc Carrière
- Constituency: Pointe-Gatineau District
- In office November 5, 2017 – November 7, 2021
- Preceded by: Richard M. Bégin
- Succeeded by: Caroline Murray
- Constituency: Deschênes District
- In office November 3, 2013 – November 5, 2017
- Preceded by: André Laframboise
- Succeeded by: Gilles Chagnon
- Constituency: Lucerne District

Personal details
- Born: December 7, 1968 (age 57) North Bay, Ontario, Canada
- Party: Independent (municipal)
- Other political affiliations: Conservative (federal); Conservative (provincial)
- Spouse: Yuko Duggan
- Education: University of Waterloo (BSc, MSc)
- Occupation: Technical support agent, teacher

Mike Duggan is a Canadian politician who has served as a city councillor in the city of Gatineau from 2013 to 2025. He was most recently the city councillor for Pointe-Gatineau District, having been elected during the 2021 Gatineau municipal election.

== Education and career ==
Duggan holds a Bachelor of Science in Chemistry and a Master of Science in Environmental Sciences from the University of Waterloo and has received various certifications in database administration, network security, web design and project management. Before entering politics, Duggan worked for 3 years as a bilingual technical support agent in Toronto, Vancouver and Ottawa, before moving to Japan for 3 years to participate in the JET Programme as an English-language teacher. He returned to Canada afterwards to work in computer network administration and in policy analysis within the federal government for over 12 years.

== Political career ==
=== Municipal politics ===
In 2013, Duggan entered politics for the first time, running as an Independent in the 2013 Gatineau municipal election, during which he was elected to city council for Lucerne District, defeating incumbent Action Gatineau city councillor André Laframboise with 38.69% of the vote. He served in the position until the 2017 municipal election, when he was elected as the city councillor for Deschênes District, again defeating another incumbent Action Gatineau city councillor, Richard M. Bégin, with 53.14% of the vote. He was succeeded in Lucerne District by Gilles Chagnon. Duggan changed districts for a third time for the 2021 municipal election, running in Pointe-Gatineau District. He was elected with 51.81% of the vote, and was succeeded in Deschênes District by Caroline Murray. On May 13, 2025, Duggan announced that he would be retiring from municipal politics and will not run in the upcoming election.

==== Political party ambitions ====
Since as early as 2019, rumours have circulated around city politics circles that Duggan had been planning to create a municipal political party in Gatineau. In 2022, Duggan reserved the political party name Dans le milieu with Élections Québec, stating that he wanted to form a political party to go against then-Mayor of Gatineau France Bélisle's governance structure.

In June 2024, Duggan announced alongside former city councillor for Bellevue District and 2017 mayoral candidate Sylvie Goneau that they were founding Évolution Gatineau, a new political party in Gatineau. This announcement was considered historic, given that at that point, there had not been more than one political party in the city at any point in time; Équipe Mario Aubé would be registered in January 2025, before Évolution Gatineau. Goneau stated that the goal of the party was to bring equal political weight to go against Action Gatineau, given that the current political situation in the city made it so that independent candidates are becoming increasingly disadvantaged in the face of a large, well-established and organized municipal political party. The party is expected to be to the right of Action Gatineau, and plans to be ready in time for the 2025 municipal election. However, after he announced his retirement, Duggan announced that he was withdrawing his involvement with Évolution Gatineau and would instead support Équipe Mario Aubé in the upcoming municipal election.

=== Federal politics ===
Duggan attempted to make a jump to federal politics, running as the Conservative Party of Canada candidate for Hull—Aylmer in the 2019 federal election. He came in fourth with 9.05% of the vote, placing behind the NDP and Bloc Québécois candidates; incumbent Liberal Greg Fergus emerged victorious in the riding.

== Controversies ==
In 2013, Le Droit reported that Duggan, while serving as a member of the Executive Committee of Gatineau City Council, allegedly behaved inappropriately in public by giving a middle finger to a journalist from the media company, even though the councillor had just publicly apologized for having insulted a constituent by e-mail. He reportedly walked out, slamming the door behind him violently. Duggan later admitted that the week wasn't going well for him and that he didn't appreciate Le Droit's coverage of the insulting e-mail, in which he says he doesn't want to be bothered with the constituent's statements. On the same day, then-Mayor Maxime Pedneaud-Jobin announced that Duggan was stepping down from the Executive Committee following the incident.

In 2024, Duggan was accused of bringing electronic devices related to his work as a city councillor on a trip to Russia; Global Affairs Canada had warned that the Federal Security Service could engage in spying on foreigners from Western countries, particularly those belonging to the NATO against a backdrop of high tensions and espionage, especially between Canada and Russia amid the Russo-Ukrainian War. Duggan later expressed regret about his trip and was ultimately not sanctioned.

== Electoral record ==
=== Municipal ===
2021 Gatineau municipal election: Pointe-Gatineau
Party	Candidate	Popular vote			Expenditures
Party	Candidate	Votes	%	±%	Expenditures
Independent	Mike Duggan	1,472	51.40	-1.75 (Note: Percentage change taken from Duggan's previous election win in Deschênes District.)	$4,246.65
Action Gatineau	Myriam Gilbert	1,134	39.59	-20.75	$4,667.51
Independent	Leon Kambi Bushiri	258	9.01	–	$2,032.99
Total valid votes		2,864	98.14		
Total rejected, unmarked and declined votes		54	1.86	-2.71	
Turnout		2,918	29.84	-2.23	
Eligible voters		9,780			
Note: Candidate campaign colours, unless a member of a party, may be based on the prominent colour used in campaign items (signs, literature, etc.) or colours used in polling graphs and are used as a visual differentiation between candidates.
Sources: Office of the City Clerk of Gatineau

=== Federal ===
2019 Canadian federal election: Hull—Aylmer
Party	Candidate	Votes	%	±%	Expenditures
Liberal	Greg Fergus	29,732	54.1	+2.73	none listed
Bloc Québécois	Joanie Riopel	8,011	14.6	+8.06	$2,949.94
New Democratic	Nicolas Thibodeau	7,467	13.6	−17.92	$26,504.52
Conservative	Mike Duggan	4,979	9.1	+1.38	$18,923.80
Green	Josée Poirier Defoy	3,869	7.0	+5.13	$9,958.48
People's	Rowen Tanguay	638	1.2	–	$638.31
Rhinoceros	Sébastien Grenier	195	0.4	–	$0.00
Marxist–Leninist	Alexandre Deschênes	102	0.2	+0.02	$0.00
Total valid votes/expense limit		54,993	100.0		
Total rejected ballots		692			
Turnout		55,685	70.4		
Eligible voters		79,072			
Liberal hold		Swing		−2.67	
Source: Elections Canada
