= 2013 Gatineau municipal election =

Municipal election in Quebec, Canada

- Mayoral election
← 2009	November 3, 2013	2017 →
- Registered: 189,036
- Turnout: 41.86% (▲2.45pp)
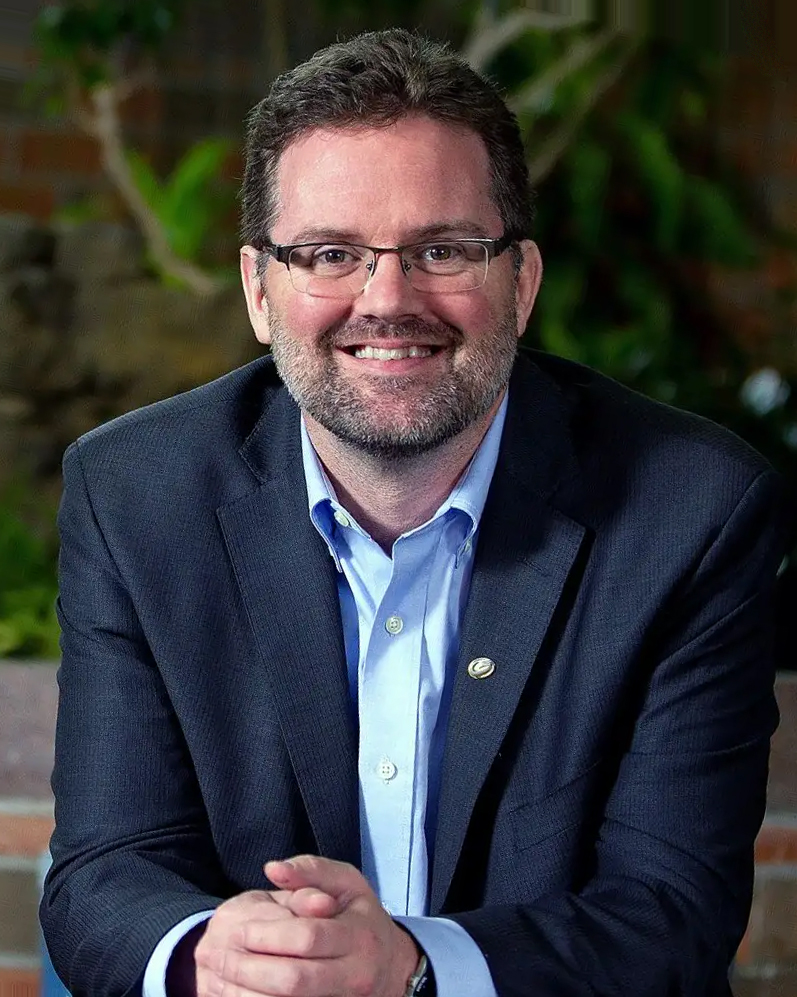

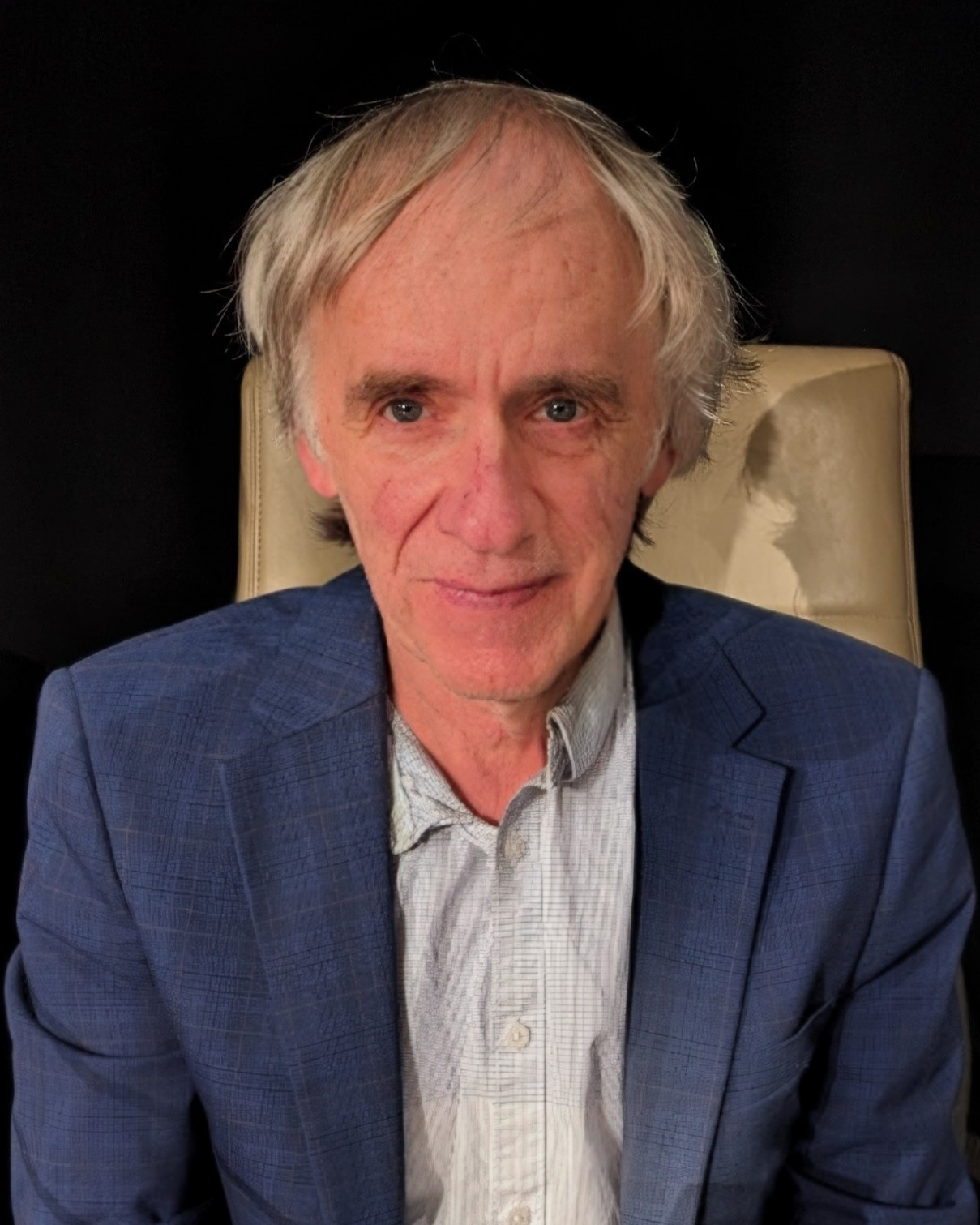
Nominee	Maxime Pedneaud-Jobin	Marc Bureau
Party	Action Gatineau	Independent
Popular vote	40,991	28,146
Percentage	52.62%	36.13%
Mayor before election
Marc Bureau
Independent
Elected mayor
Maxime Pedneaud-Jobin
Action Gatineau
- City Council election
← 2009	November 3, 2013	2017 →
- 18 seats on Gatineau City Council (Note: The Mayor is a member of City Council, but for the purposes of documentation is treated as their own individual.); 10 seats needed for a majority
- Turnout: 41.85%
Party	Leader	Vote %	Seats	+/–
Independent	–	58.59	14	−4
AG	Maxime Pedneaud-Jobin	41.41	4	+4
This lists parties that won seats. See the complete results below.
City Council results by district

A municipal election was held in Gatineau, Quebec, Canada on November 3, 2013 in conjunction with 2013 Quebec municipal elections across the province on that date. Elections were held for Mayor of Gatineau as well as for each of the 18 districts on Gatineau City Council.

== Mayoral race ==
Party	Candidate	Vote	%
Action Gatineau	Maxime Pedneaud-Jobin	40,991	52.62
Independent	Marc Bureau (X)	28,146	36.13
Independent	Jacques Lemay	7,492	9.62
Independent	François P. D'Aoust	1,266	1.63

== Aylmer District ==
2013 Gatineau municipal election: Aylmer
Party	Candidate	Popular vote			Expenditures
Party	Candidate	Votes	%	±%	Expenditures
Independent	Josée Lacasse	2,485	53.44	–	$4,942.40
Action Gatineau	Stefan Psenak	2,165	46.56	-3.47	none listed
Total valid votes		4,650	99.10		
Total rejected, unmarked and declined votes		42	0.90	-0.51	
Turnout		4,692	39.02	+3.48	
Eligible voters		11,917			
Note: Candidate campaign colours, unless a member of a party, may be based on the prominent colour used in campaign items (signs, literature, etc.) or colours used in polling graphs and are used as a visual differentiation between candidates.
Sources: Office of the City Clerk of Gatineau and Élections Québec

== Lucerne District ==
Party	Candidate	Vote	%
Independent	Mike Duggan	1,647	38.69
Action Gatineau	André Laframboise (X)	1,361	31.97
Independent	Roch Givogue	1,115	26.19
Independent	Claude Turpin	134	3.15

== Deschênes District ==
Party	Candidate	Vote	%
Action Gatineau	Richard M. Bégin	2,399	54.23
Independent	Alain Riel (X)	2,023	45.73

== Plateau District ==
Party	Candidate	Vote	%
Independent	Maxime Tremblay (X)	2,435	57.46
Action Gatineau	François Léveillé	1,803	42.54

== Manoir-des-Trembles-Val-Tétreau District ==
Party	Candidate	Vote	%
Independent	Jocelyn Blondin	2,176	50.85
Action Gatineau	Christian Meilleur	2,103	49.15

== l'Orée-du-Parc District ==
Party	Candidate	Vote	%
Action Gatineau	Mireille Apollon (X)	2,983	58.58
Independent	Bruno Bonneville	2,109	41.42

== Parc-de-la-Montagne-Saint-Raymond District ==
Party	Candidate	Vote	%
Independent	Louise Boudrias	2,211	50.06
Action Gatineau	Adrian Corbo	1,919	43.45
Independent	André-Félix Comeau	287	6.50

== Hull-Wright District ==
Party	Candidate	Vote	%
Independent	Denise Laferrière (X)	1,678	58.75
Action Gatineau	Isabelle N. Miron	1,049	36.73
Independent	Debelle Michel	129	4.52

== Limbour District ==
Party	Candidate	Vote	%
Independent	Cédric Tessier	2,444	43.29
Action Gatineau	Wassim Aboutanos	1,689	29.92
Independent	Nicole Champagne (X)	1,512	26.78

== Touraine District ==
Party	Candidate	Vote	%
Independent	Denis Tassé (X)	2,533	61.02
Action Gatineau	Alexandre Fortin-Bordeleau	1,618	38.98

== Pointe-Gatineau District ==
Party	Candidate	Vote	%
Action Gatineau	Myriam Nadeau	1,577	43.98
Independent	André François Choquette	837	23.34
Independent	Pierre Laurin	677	18.88
Independent	Patrick Pilon	495	13.80

== Carrefour-de-l'Hôpital District ==
Party	Candidate	Vote	%
Independent	Gilles Carpentier	2,898	67.65
Action Gatineau	Nawel Benyelles	1,386	32.35

== Versant District ==
Party	Candidate	Vote	%
Independent	Daniel Champagne	2,607	57.35
Action Gatineau	Geneviève Ouimet	1,939	42.65

== Bellevue District ==
Party	Candidate	Vote	%
Independent	Sylvie Goneau (X)	2,928	66.14
Action Gatineau	Christian Violy	1,499	33.86

== Lac-Beauchamp District ==
Party	Candidate	Vote	%
Independent	Stéphane Lauzon (X)	2,632	74.04
Action Gatineau	Chakib Ahmimed	923	25.96

== la Rivière-Blanche District ==
- Note: Eric Bourgeau initially won by one vote (1300 to 1299), however a recount gave Jean Lessard a one-vote win over Bourgeau

Party	Candidate	Vote	%
Independent	Jean Lessard	1,296	29.20
Independent	Eric Bourgeau	1,295	29.17
Action Gatineau	Francine Parent-Stuart	1,278	28.78
Independent	Jason S. Noble	570	12.84

== Masson-Angers District ==
Party	Candidate	Vote	%
Independent	Marc Carrière	1,636	39.17
Action Gatineau	Roland Frenette, Jr.	1,326	31.75
Independent	Luc Montreuil (X)	1,215	29.09

== Buckingham District ==
Party	Candidate	Vote	%
Action Gatineau	Martin Lajeunesse	3,249	73.11
Independent	Yan Hébert	1,195	26.89
