= Lucerne District (Gatineau) =

Municipal electoral division in Gatineau, Quebec, Canada

District 2 - Lucerne
- Constituency for the Gatineau City Council
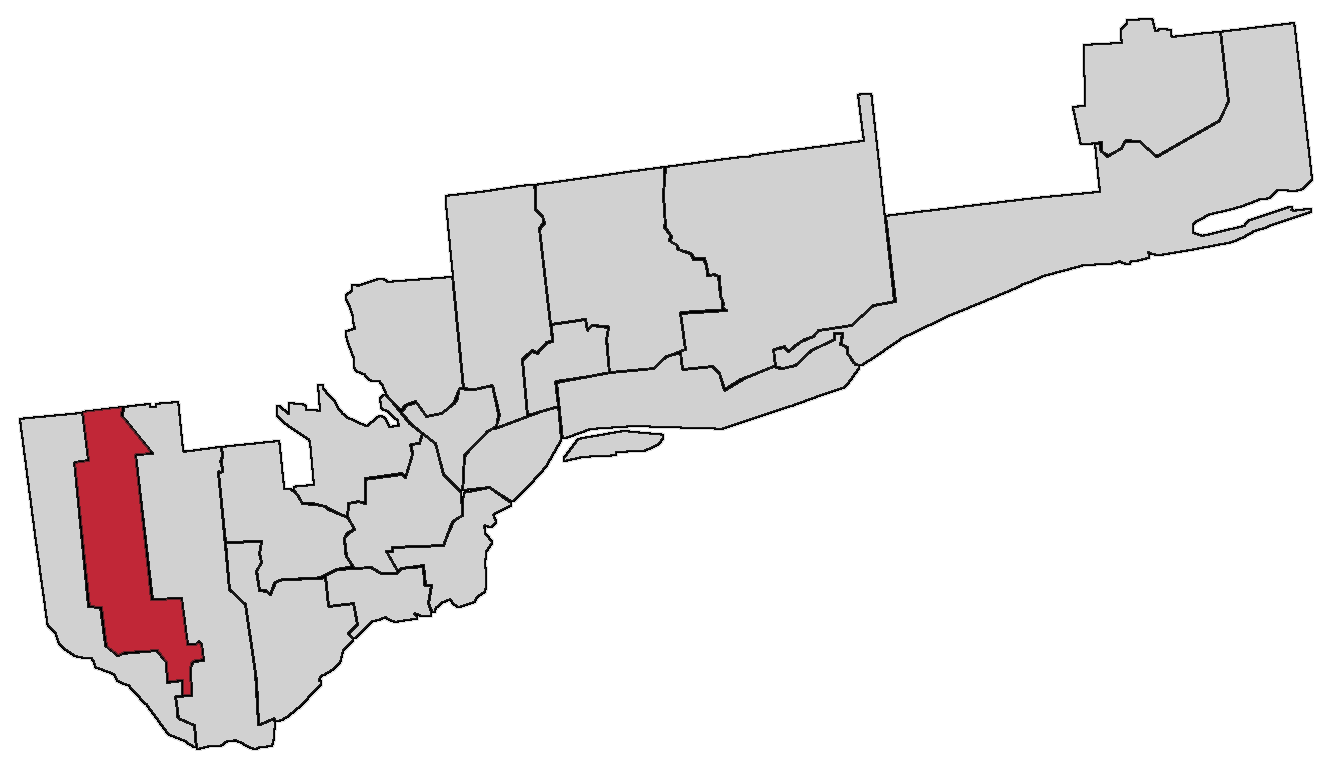
- Location of Lucerne District in Gatineau
- City: Gatineau
- Population: 10,748 (2019)
- Area: 19.31 km²

Current constituency
- Created: 2000
Councillor
Sonia Ben-Arfa
Action Gatineau
- Sector(s): Aylmer
- First contested: 2001 election
- Last contested: 2025 election

Lucerne District (District 2) is a municipal electoral division in the city of Gatineau, Quebec. It is represented on Gatineau City Council by Sonia Ben-Arfa.

== Geography ==
The district is located in the Aylmer sector of the city. It is one of five districts in the sector. The district includes the neighbourhoods of La Seigneurie, Jardins Lavigne and some of Aylmer's northern suburban developments.

== History ==
| Council | Years | Member | Party |
|---|---|---|---|
| 1st | 2002–2005 | Alain Labonté | Independent |
| 2nd | 2005–2009 | André Laframboise | Independent |
| 3rd | 2009–2012 | André Laframboise | Independent |
| 3rd | 2012–2013 | André Laframboise | Action Gatineau |
| 4th | 2013–2017 | Mike Duggan | Independent |
| 5th | 2017–2021 | Gilles Chagnon | Independent |
| 6th | 2021–2025 | Gilles Chagnon | Independent |
| 7th | 2025–present | Sonia Ben-Arfa | Action Gatineau |

== Election results ==
=== 2021 ===
| Party | Candidate | Vote | % |
|---|---|---|---|
| Independent | Gilles Chagnon | 2,641 | 67.39 |
| Action Gatineau | Laurent Lavallée | 1,278 | 32.61 |

=== 2017 ===
| Party | Candidate | Vote | % |
|---|---|---|---|
| Independent | Gilles Chagnon | 1,996 | 41.95 |
| Action Gatineau | Véronic Boyer | 1,643 | 34.53 |
| Independent | Mamadou Garanké Bah | 835 | 17.55 |
| Independent | Roch Givogue | 284 | 5.97 |

=== 2013 ===
| Party | Candidate | Vote | % |
|---|---|---|---|
| Independent | Mike Duggan | 1,647 | 38.69 |
| Action Gatineau | André Laframboise | 1,361 | 31.97 |
| Independent | Roch Givogue | 1,115 | 26.19 |
| Independent | Claude Turpin | 134 | 3.15 |

=== 2009 ===
| Candidate | Vote | % |
|---|---|---|
| André Laframboise | 2,188 | 53.5 |
| Roch Givogue | 1,313 | 32.1 |
| Barbara Charlebois | 587 | 14.4 |

=== 2005 ===
| Candidate | Votes | % |
|---|---|---|
| André Laframboise | 1,904 | 43.95 |
| Thomas Gagné | 1,178 | 27.19 |
| Jean-Yves Tremblay | 929 | 21.45 |
| Susan Miller | 321 | 7.41 |

=== 2001 ===
2001 Gatineau municipal election: Lucerne
| Party | Candidate | Popular vote | | | Expenditures |
| Party | Candidate | Votes | % | ±% | Expenditures |
|---|---|---|---|---|---|
| Independent | Alain Labonté | 2,196 | 51.30 | – | none listed |
| Independent | André Laframboise | 2,082 | 48.70 | – | none listed |
| Total valid votes | | 4,278 | 97.85 | | |
| Total rejected, unmarked and declined votes | | 68 | 2.15 | – | |
| Turnout | | 4,372 | 49.61 | – | |
| Eligible voters | | 8,812 | | | |
Note: Candidate campaign colours, unless a member of a party, may be based on the prominent colour used in campaign items (signs, literature, etc.) or colours used in polling graphs and are used as a visual differentiation between candidates.
Sources: Office of the City Clerk of Gatineau
