= Mitigomijokan District =

Municipal electoral division in Gatineau, Quebec, Canada

District 5 - Mitigomijokan
- Constituency for the Gatineau City Council
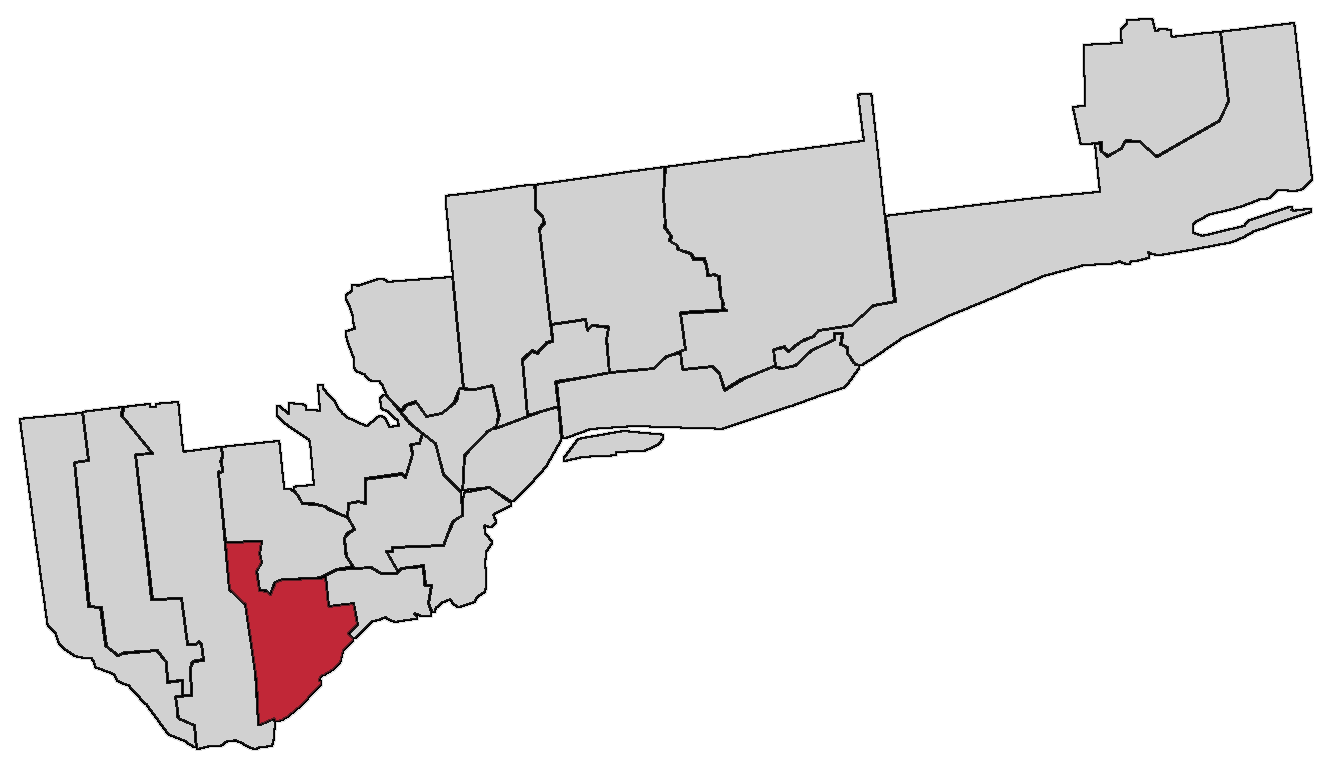
- Location of Mitigomijokan District in Gatineau
- City: Gatineau
- Population: 10,475 (2019)
- Area: 17.28 km²

Current constituency
- Created: 2021
Councillor
Rachel Deslauriers
AG
- Sector(s): Aylmer
- Created from: Parts of: Plateau District; Deschênes District
- First contested: 2021 election
- Last contested: 2025 election

Mitigomijokan (District 5) is a municipal electoral division in the Aylmer sector of Gatineau, Quebec, that has been represented in the Gatineau City Council since the 2021 municipal election.

Mitigomijokan means "place of the oak" in the Anishinaabe language.

== Geography ==
The district is located in the eastern part of Aylmer, and consists of the neighbourhoods of Kilroy Crescent, Parc-Champlain, Mountain View, the eastern half of Lakeview-Terrasse and the western part of Plateau.

== Councillors ==
Council term	Member	Party
2021–2025	Anik Des Marais	Action Gatineau
2025–present	Rachel Deslauriers	Action Gatineau

== Election results ==
=== 2021 ===
2021 Gatineau municipal election: Mitigomijokan
Party	Candidate	Popular vote			Expenditures
Party	Candidate	Votes	%	±%	Expenditures
Action Gatineau	Anik Des Marais	1,373	40.31	–	$4,805.50
Independent	André Pelletier	1,140	33.47	–	$4,878.94
Independent	Bello Mansour	893	26.22	–	$4,430.55
Total valid votes		3,406	98.14		
Total rejected, unmarked and declined votes		33	0.96	–	
Turnout		3,439	31.12	–	
Eligible voters		11,052			
Note: Candidate campaign colours, unless a member of a party, may be based on the prominent colour used in campaign items (signs, literature, etc.) or colours used in polling graphs and are used as a visual differentiation between candidates.
Sources: Office of the City Clerk of Gatineau
