= Plateau–Manoir-des-Trembles District =

The Plateau–Manoir-des-Trembles District (District 4) was a municipal district in the city of Gatineau, Quebec. It was represented on Gatineau City Council by Maxime Tremblay for the entirety of its existence.

The district was located on the western edge of the Hull sector of the city. The district included the neighbourhoods of Birch Manor (Manoir-des-Trembles) and Le Plateau.

The district was created in 2009 and was abolished in 2013 into Plateau District and Manoir-des-Trembles-Val-Tétreau District.

== Election results ==
=== 2009 ===
Candidate	Vote	%
Maxime Tremblay	2,076	48.7
Nycole Turmel	1,980	46.5
Jean-Nicholas Martineau	205	4.8
