= Manoir-des-Trembles–Val-Tétreau District =

Municipal electoral division in Gatineau, Quebec, Canada

Coordinates: 45.423°N 75.759°W

District 6 - Manoir-des-Trembles–Val-Tétreau
- Constituency for the Gatineau City Council
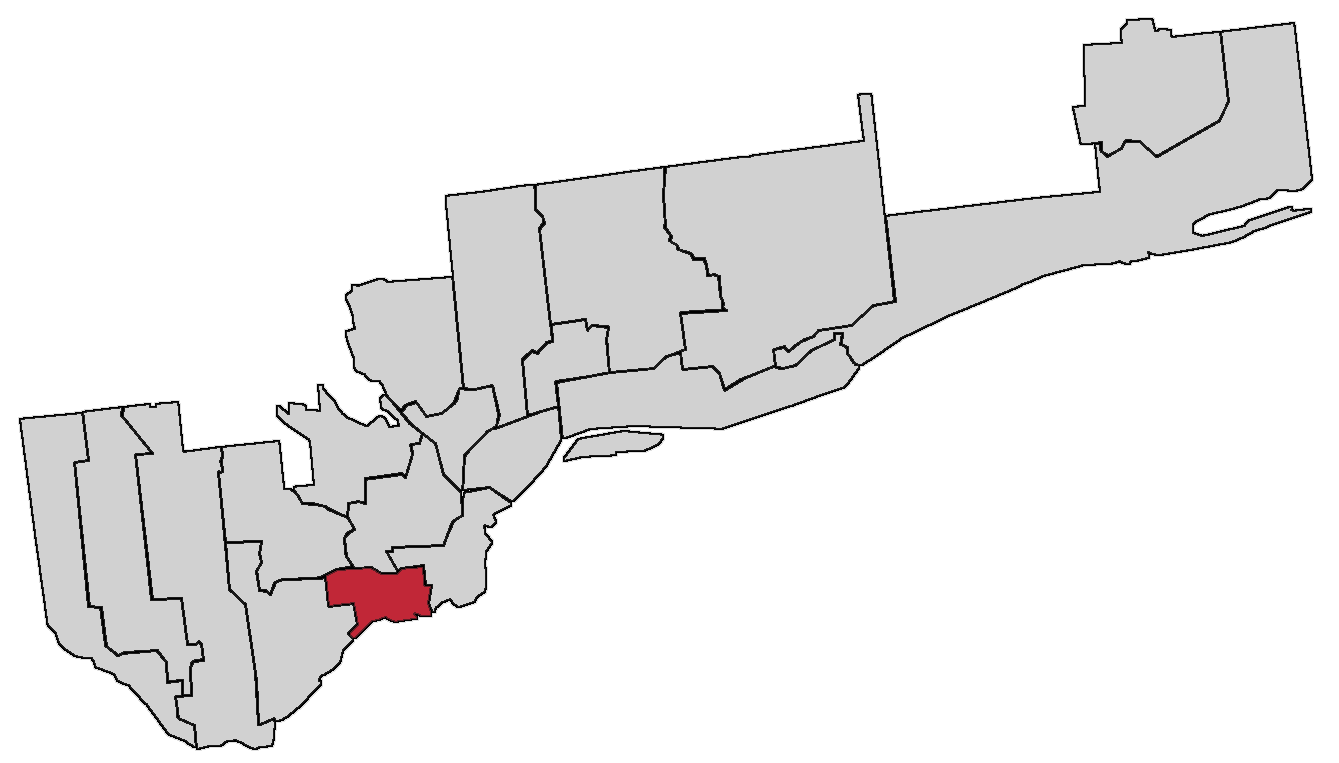
- Location of Manoir-des-Trembles–Val-Tétreau District in Gatineau
- City: Gatineau
- Population: 9,458 (2019)
- Area: 6.86 km²

Current constituency
- Created: 2013
Councillor
Adrian Corbo
Action Gatineau
- Sector(s): Hull; Aylmer
- Created from: Parts of: Plateau–Manoir-des-Trembles District; Hull–Val-Tétreau District
- First contested: 2013 election
- Last contested: 2025 election

Manoir-des-Trembles–Val-Tétreau District (District 6) is a municipal electoral division in the city of Gatineau, Quebec. It is currently served on Gatineau City Council by Adrian Corbo.

The district is located in the Hull and Aylmer sectors of the city. The district includes the western part of Hull, including the neighbourhoods of Birch Manor (Manoir-des-Trembles), Jardins-Alexandre-Taché, Val-Tétreau, Jardins-Mackenzie-King and part of Wrightville.

The district was created for the 2013 election from parts of Plateau–Manoir-des-Trembles District and Hull–Val-Tétreau District.

== Councillors ==
Council term	Party	Member
2013–2017	Independent	Jocelyn Blondin
2017–2021	Independent	Jocelyn Blondin
2021–2025	Independent	Jocelyn Blondin
2025–present	Action Gatineau	Adrian Corbo

== Election results ==
=== 2021 ===
Party	Candidate	Vote	%
Independent	Jocelyn Blondin	2,013	55.30
Action Gatineau	Darlène Lozis	1,627	44.70

=== 2017 ===
Party	Candidate	Vote	%
Independent	Jocelyn Blondin	2,069	51.82
Action Gatineau	Mélisa Ferreira	1,924	48.18

=== 2013 ===
Party	Candidate	Vote	%
Independent	Jocelyn Blondin	2,176	50.85
Action Gatineau	Christian Meilleur	2,103	49.15
