= 2021 Gatineau municipal election =

Municipal election in Quebec, Canada

- Mayoral election
← 2017	November 7, 2021	2024 (by-election) →
- Registered: 199,302
- Turnout: 35.10% (▼3.42pp)
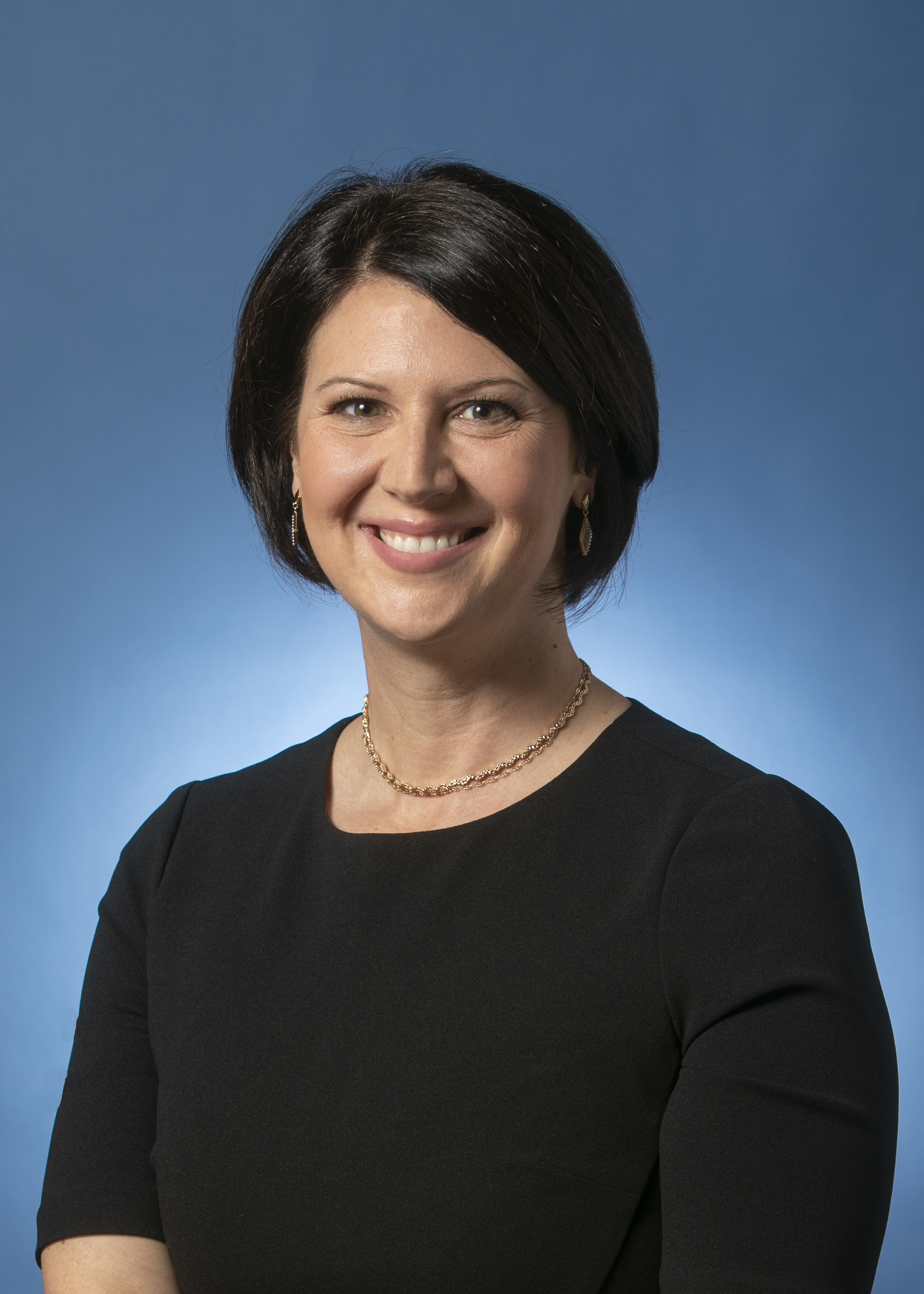

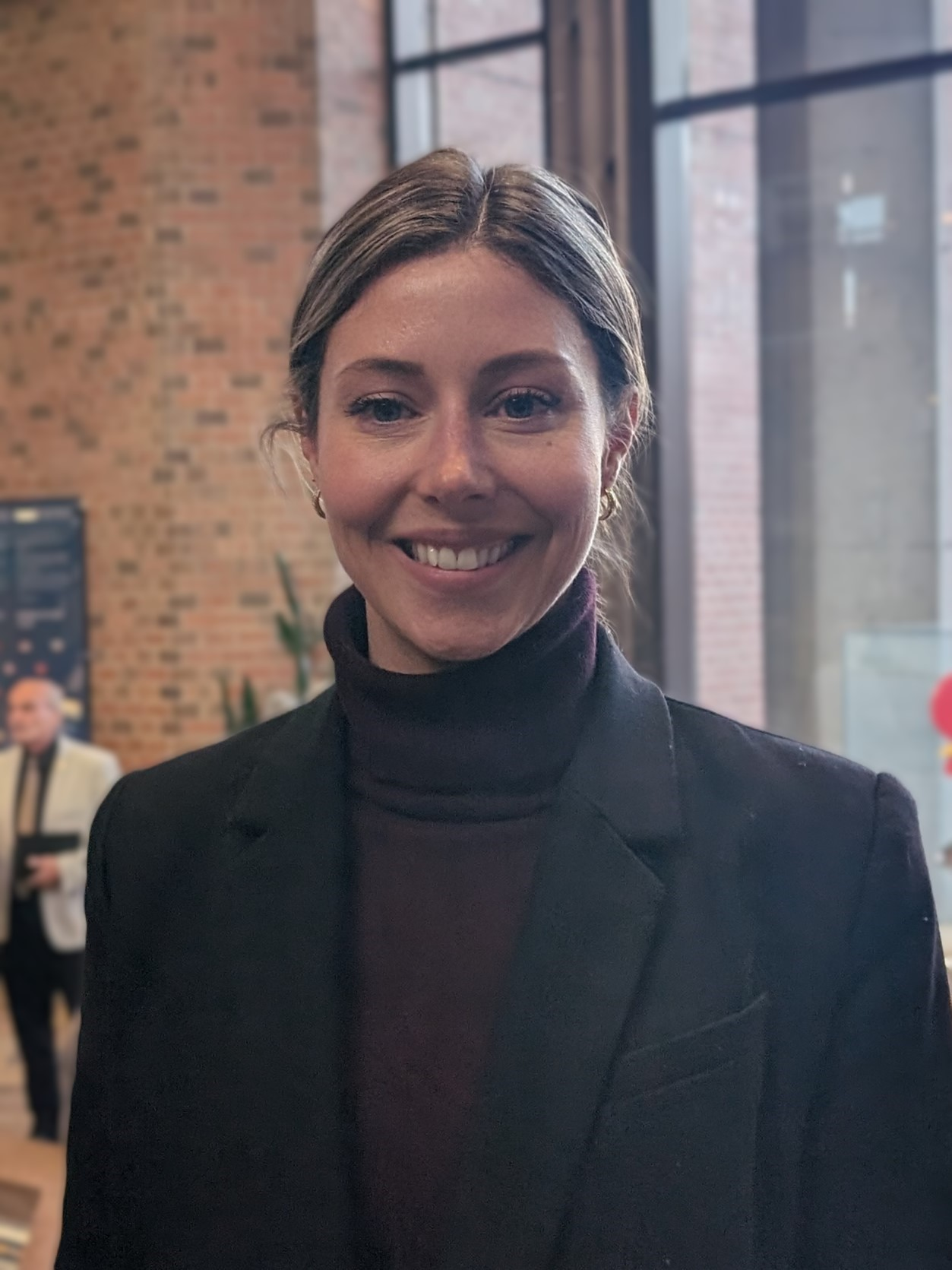
			JL
Nominee	France Bélisle	Maude Marquis-Bissonnette	Jean-François Leblanc
Party	Independent	Action Gatineau	Independent
Popular vote	29,734	26,159	11,330
Percentage	42.83%	37.68%	16.32%
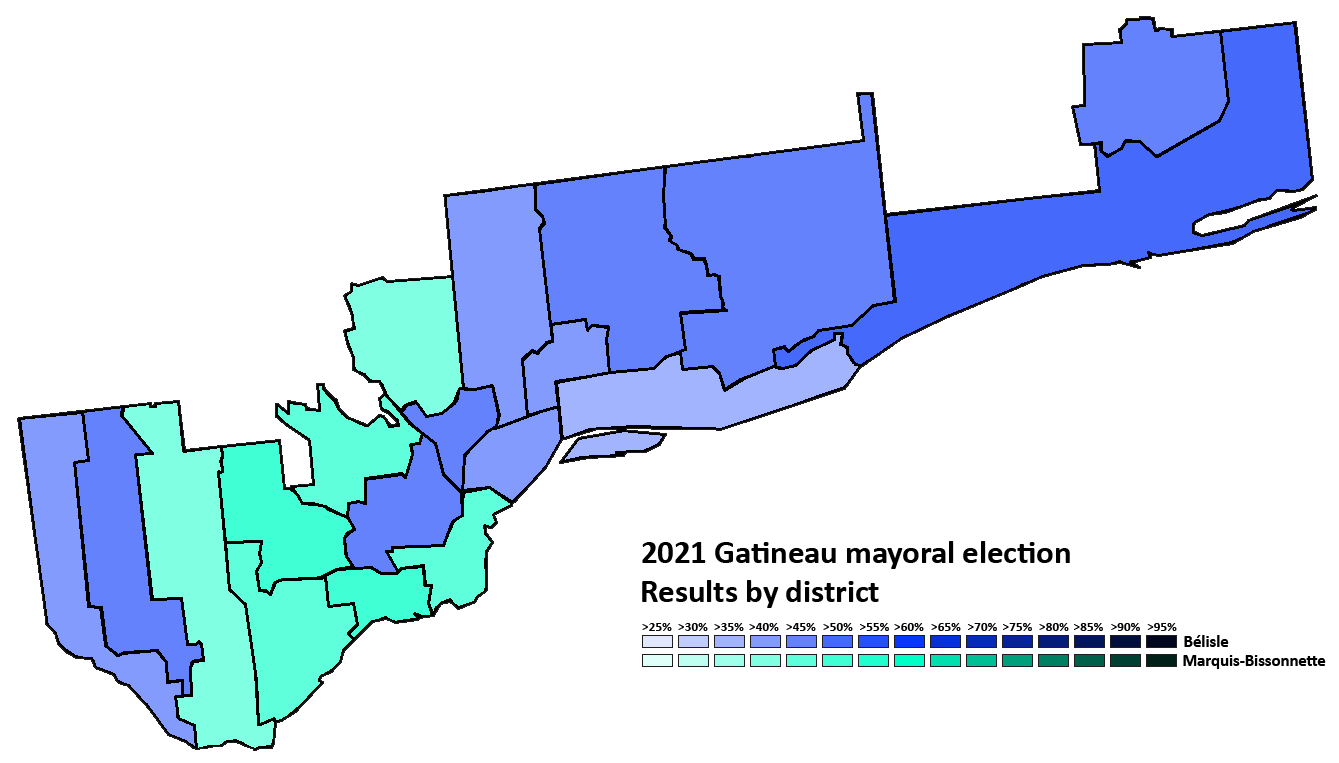
- Mayoral results by district
Mayor before election
Maxime Pedneaud-Jobin
Action Gatineau
Elected mayor
France Bélisle
Independent
- City Council election
← 2017	November 7, 2021	2025 →
- 19 seats on Gatineau City Council (Note: The Mayor is a member of City Council, but for the purposes of documentation is treated as their own individual.); 10 seats needed for a majority
- Turnout: 35.12% (▲4.70pp)
Party	Leader	Vote %	Seats	+/–
Independent	–	61.29	11	0
AG	Maude Marquis-Bissonnette	38.71	8	+1
This lists parties that won seats. See the complete results below.
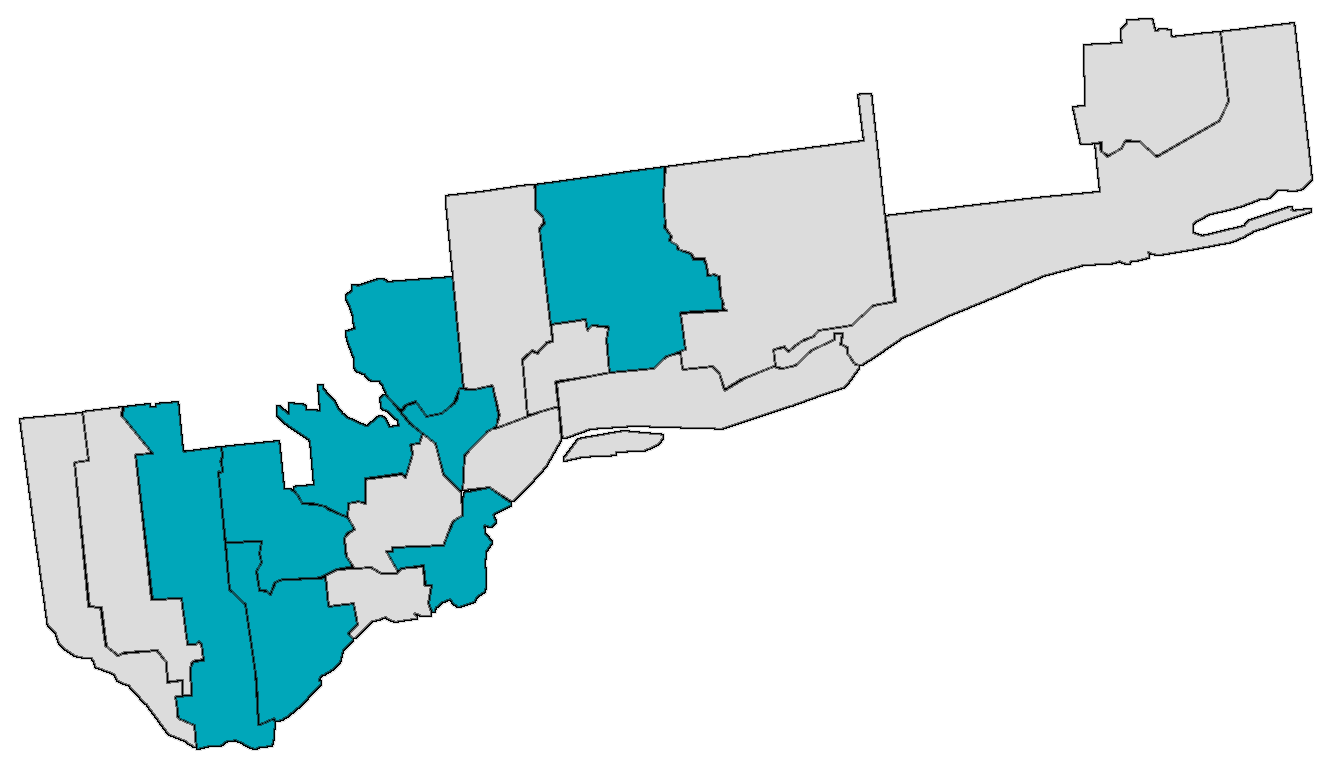
City Council winners by district

The 2021 Gatineau municipal election was held on Sunday, November 7, 2021, to elect the mayor and city councillors in Gatineau, Quebec, Canada, in conjunction with the 2021 Quebec municipal elections held on the same day.

Mayor Maxime Pedneaud-Jobin announced he would not be running for re-election.

City council will expand by one seat, with the creation of the Mitigomijokan District out of parts of the Plateau and Deschênes Districts.

== Mayoral race ==
2021 Gatineau municipal election: Mayor
Party	Candidate	Popular vote			Expenditures
Party	Candidate	Votes	%	±%	Expenditures
Independent	France Bélisle	29,768	42.86	–	$81,079.89
Action Gatineau	Maude Marquis-Bissonnette	26,151	37.65	-7.46	none listed
Independent	Jean-François Leblanc	11,326	16.31	–	$71,309.44
Independent	Jacques Lemay	1,077	1.55	–	$8,206.19
Independent	Rémi Bergeron	727	1.05	–	$0.00
Independent	Abdelhak Lekbabi	411	0.59	–	none listed
Total valid votes		69,460	99.25		
Total rejected, unmarked and declined votes		524	0.75	-0.98	
Turnout		69,984	35.11	-3.41	
Eligible voters		199,302			
Note: Candidate campaign colours, unless a member of a party, are based on the prominent colour used in campaign items (signs, literature, etc.) or colours used in polling graphs and are used as a visual differentiation between candidates.
Sources: Office of the City Clerk of Gatineau and Élections Québec

=== Opinion polls ===
Polling firm	Source	Last date of polling	Sample Size (Note: Key: DV – decided voters AV – all voters)	MoE	France Bélisle	Rémi Bergeron	Yves Ducharme	Jean-François Leblanc	Abdelhak Lekbabi	Jacques Lemay	Maude Marquis-Bissonnette	Myriam Nadeau	Frédéric Poulin	NOT/ UD/NV
2021 Gatineau mayoral election	HTML	November 7, 2021	69,460	—	42.86	1.05	–	16.31	0.59	1.55	37.65	–	–	—
CROP (Note: Commissioned by Ici Radio-Canada Télé.)	HTML	October 16, 2021	502	± 4.0%	12.0%	1.0%	–	6.0%	<1.0%	3.0%	22.0%	–	–	55.0%
Navigator Research (Note: Commissioned by Le Droit and 104.7 Outaouais.)	HTML	October 6, 2021	510	± 4.0%	23.0%	<1.0%	–	9.0%	–	3.0%	26.0%	–	–	57.0%
SOM (Note: Commissioned by Ici Radio-Canada Télé.)	HTML	February 11, 2021	568	± 4.3%	10.0%	–	12.0%	3.0%	–	–	7.0%	8.0%	3.0%	57.0%

== Aylmer District ==
2021 Gatineau municipal election: Aylmer
Party	Candidate	Popular vote			Expenditures
Party	Candidate	Votes	%	±%	Expenditures
Independent	Steven Boivin	1,775	56.69	–	$4,970.80
Action Gatineau	Julie Cool	1,356	43.31	+23.77	none listed
Total valid votes		3,131	98.46		
Total rejected, unmarked and declined votes		49	1.54	+0.52	
Turnout		3,180	30.09	-6.51	
Eligible voters		10,570			
Note: Candidate campaign colours, unless a member of a party, may be based on the prominent colour used in campaign items (signs, literature, etc.) or colours used in polling graphs and are used as a visual differentiation between candidates.
Sources: Office of the City Clerk of Gatineau and Élections Québec

== Lucerne District ==
Party	Candidate	Vote	%
Independent	Gilles Chagnon (X)	2,641	67.39
Action Gatineau	Laurent Lavallée	1,278	32.61

== Deschênes District ==
Party	Candidate	Vote	%
Action Gatineau	Caroline Murray	1,808	54.92
Independent	Michel Raymond	1,239	37.64
Independent	Kevin Shannon	245	7.44

== Plateau District ==
Party	Candidate	Vote	%
Action Gatineau	Bettyna Belizaire	2,351	61.42
Independent	Serge Tonlé	1,477	38.58

== Mitigomijokan District ==
2021 Gatineau municipal election: Mitigomijokan
Party	Candidate	Popular vote			Expenditures
Party	Candidate	Votes	%	±%	Expenditures
Action Gatineau	Anik Des Marais	1,373	40.31	–	$4,805.50
Independent	André Pelletier	1,140	33.47	–	$4,878.94
Independent	Bello Mansour	893	26.22	–	$4,430.55
Total valid votes		3,406	98.14		
Total rejected, unmarked and declined votes		33	0.96	–	
Turnout		3,439	31.12	–	
Eligible voters		11,052			
Note: Candidate campaign colours, unless a member of a party, may be based on the prominent colour used in campaign items (signs, literature, etc.) or colours used in polling graphs and are used as a visual differentiation between candidates.
Sources: Office of the City Clerk of Gatineau

== Manoir-des-Trembles-Val-Tétreau District ==
Party	Candidate	Vote	%
Independent	Jocelyn Blondin (X)	2,013	55.30
Action Gatineau	Darlène Lozis	1,627	44.70

== Hull-Wright District ==
Party	Candidate	Vote	%
Action Gatineau	Steve Moran	1,203	48.57
Independent	René Coignaud	679	27.41
Independent	Jacques G. Lavoie	595	24.02

== Parc-de-la-Montagne-Saint-Raymond District ==
Party	Candidate	Vote	%
Independent	Louise Boudrias (X)	2,360	69.37
Action Gatineau	Jordan Larochelle	797	23.43
Independent	Jérémie Carrier	245	7.20

== Orée-du-Parc District ==
Party	Candidate	Vote	%
Action Gatineau	Isabelle N. Miron (X)	2,540	61.95
Independent	Jacques Lacasse	1,560	38.05

== Limbour District ==
Party	Candidate	Vote	%
Action Gatineau	Louis Sabourin	2,102	41.88
Independent	Dérik Maltais	1,839	36.64
Independent	Nicole Champagne	1,078	21.48

== Touraine District ==
Party	Candidate	Vote	%
Action Gatineau	Tiffany-Lee Norris Parent	1,289	38.43
Independent	Jean-Manuel Bock	1,098	32.74
Independent	Jean-Pierre Leroux	967	28.83

== Pointe-Gatineau District ==
2021 Gatineau municipal election: Pointe-Gatineau
Party	Candidate	Popular vote			Expenditures
Party	Candidate	Votes	%	±%	Expenditures
Independent	Mike Duggan	1,472	51.40	-1.75 (Note: Percentage change taken from Duggan's previous election win in Deschênes District.)	$4,246.65
Action Gatineau	Myriam Gilbert	1,134	39.59	-20.75	$4,667.51
Independent	Leon Kambi Bushiri	258	9.01	–	$2,032.99
Total valid votes		2,864	98.14		
Total rejected, unmarked and declined votes		54	1.86	-2.71	
Turnout		2,918	29.84	-2.23	
Eligible voters		9,780			
Note: Candidate campaign colours, unless a member of a party, may be based on the prominent colour used in campaign items (signs, literature, etc.) or colours used in polling graphs and are used as a visual differentiation between candidates.
Sources: Office of the City Clerk of Gatineau

== Carrefour-de-l'Hôpital District ==
Party	Candidate	Vote	%
Independent	Olive Kamanyana	1,923	52.43
Action Gatineau	Clément Bélanger	901	24.56
Independent	Frédérick Castonguay	506	13.79
Independent	Alexandre Bouchard	338	9.21

== Versant District ==
Party	Candidate	Vote	%
Independent	Daniel Champagne (X)	2,842	72.30
Action Gatineau	Luc Bégin	1,089	27.70

== Bellevue District ==
Party	Candidate	Vote	%
Action Gatineau	Alicia Brunet-Lacasse	1,732	41.78
Independent	Paul Cloutier	883	21.30
Independent	Michel Payette	881	21.25
Independent	Serge Charette	650	15.68

== Lac-Beauchamp District ==
Party	Candidate	Vote	%
Independent	Denis Girouard	1,725	56.76
Action Gatineau	Marie-Nicole Groulx	1,314	43.24

== Rivière-Blanche District ==
Party	Candidate	Vote	%
Independent	Jean Lessard (X)	2,833	73.36
Action Gatineau	Tanya Desforges	1,029	26.64

== Masson-Angers District ==
Party	Candidate	Vote	%
Independent	Mario Aubé	2,295	60.49
Independent	Sylvain Tremblay	626	16.50
Action Gatineau	Alain Bergeron	547	14.42
Independent	Martin Emond	326	8.59

== Buckingham District ==
Party	Candidate	Vote	%
Independent	Edmond Leclerc	2,248	57.52
Action Gatineau	Martin Lajeunesse (X)	1,158	29.63
Independent	Michel Roy	502	12.85
