= Nicolas de Vignau =

Nicolas de Vignau was a companion of Samuel de Champlain in New France. Champlain said of him in his writings "[He is] the most impudent liar that has been seen for a long time".

== Biography ==
In 1611, Vignau volunteered to live with a group of Algonquin natives to learn their language and customs. He accompanied them on their journey North to Allumette Island becoming the second white man to travel up the Ottawa River.

Vignau spent the winter on Allumette island with a band of Algonquins led by a one-eyed chief named Tessouat. Anyone coming down the river was forced, by rapids on either side of the island, to portage through Tessouat's territory. Thus his band could easily make a living as toll keepers and fur brokers, buying and selling furs for profit. In the spring of 1612, Vignau paddled down to Montreal and caught the next sailing ship to France. Once there he claimed to have discovered the Northwest Passage. Vignau swore that at the sources of the Ottawa River, he had found a great lake. After crossing it he discovered a river flowing northward. This river led to the shores of the sea. There he had seen the wreck of an English ship whose crew of eighty men had escaped to land and been killed by the Natives. Plus this sea was only seventeen days from Montreal by canoe. It seemed too good to be true.

Vignau was asked by Champlain to sign a formal statement of his discovery before two notaries and agreed to accompany Champlain up the Ottawa river the next spring to investigate the veracity of these claims. In 1613, they reached Allumette island where Champlain asked Tessouat if he would provide a guide to escort them to the source of the river. When Tessouat explained the danger posed by the Sorcerers and violent tribes further north, Champlain explained that Vignau had already gone through their land. Tessouat knew this to be false and denounced Vignau as a liar and braggart. Under pressure, Vignau confessed.

Though Nicolas de Vignau did not discover the Northwest Passage, he may have spoken to some natives that had been as far north as Hudson Bay. The tale of the wrecked British ship may have some basis in fact, as Henry Hudson had sailed into Hudson Bay in 1611 and his ship was set adrift by his mutinous crew there.
