= Parc-de-la-Montagne–Saint-Raymond District =

Municipal electoral division in Gatineau, Quebec, Canada

District 8 - Parc-de-la-Montagne–Saint-Raymond
- Constituency for the Gatineau City Council
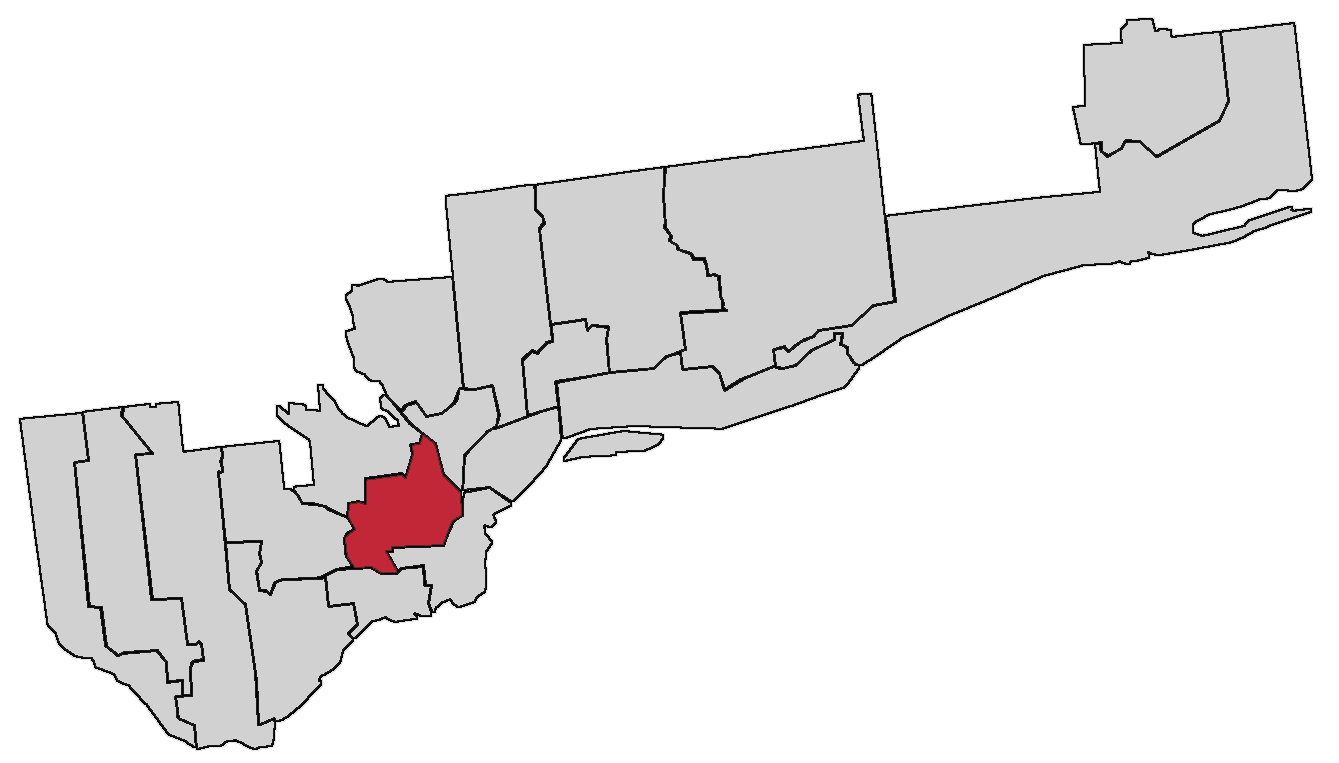
- Location of Parc-de-la-Montagne–Saint-Raymond District in Gatineau
- City: Gatineau
- Population: 10,660 (2019)
- Area: 10.65 km²

Current constituency
- Created: 2013
Councillor
Isabelle Cousineau
Action Gatineau
- Sector(s): Hull
- Created from: Wright–Parc-de-la-Montagne District; Saint-Raymond–Vanier District
- First contested: 2013 election
- Last contested: 2021 election

Parc-de-la-Montagne–Saint-Raymond District (District 8) is a municipal electoral division in the city of Gatineau, Quebec. Its seat on Gatineau City Council is now occupied by Isabelle Cousineau.

The district is located in the Hull sector of the city, and contains the neighbourhoods of Lac-des-Fées, most of Parc-de-la-Montagne and the northern half of Wrightville.

The district was created for the 2013 election, when Wright–Parc-de-la-Montagne District and Saint-Raymond–Vanier District merged.

== Councillors ==
Council term	Party	Member
2013–2017	Independent	Louise Boudrias (Note: Died in office.)
2017–2021	Independent	Louise Boudrias
2021–2025	Independent	Louise Boudrias
2021–2025	Independent	Marc Bureau
2025–present	Action Gatineau	Isabelle Cousineau

== Election results ==
=== 2022 by-election ===
A by-election was held October 23, 2022, following the death of Louise Boudrias. The results are as follows:

Party	Candidate	Vote	%
Independent	Marc Bureau	1,703	61.86
Action Gatineau	Anne-Marie Roy	590	21.43
Independent	Mathieu Paquette	227	8.25
Independent	Jacques G. Lavoie	142	5.16
Independent	Jérémie Carrier	70	2.54
Independent	Rémi Bergeron	21	0.76

=== 2021 ===
Party	Candidate	Vote	%
Independent	Louise Boudrias	2,360	69.37
Action Gatineau	Jordan Larochelle	797	23.43
Independent	Jérémie Carrier	245	7.20

=== 2017 ===
Party	Candidate	Vote	%
Independent	Louise Boudrias	2,527	65.35
Action Gatineau	Yolaine Ruel	1,340	34.65

=== 2013 ===
Party	Candidate	Vote	%
Independent	Louise Boudrias	2,211	50.06
Action Gatineau	Adrian Corbo	1,919	43.45
Independent	André-Félix Comeau	287	6.50
