= Plateau District =

Municipal electoral division in Gatineau, Quebec, Canada

District 4 - Plateau
- Constituency for the Gatineau City Council
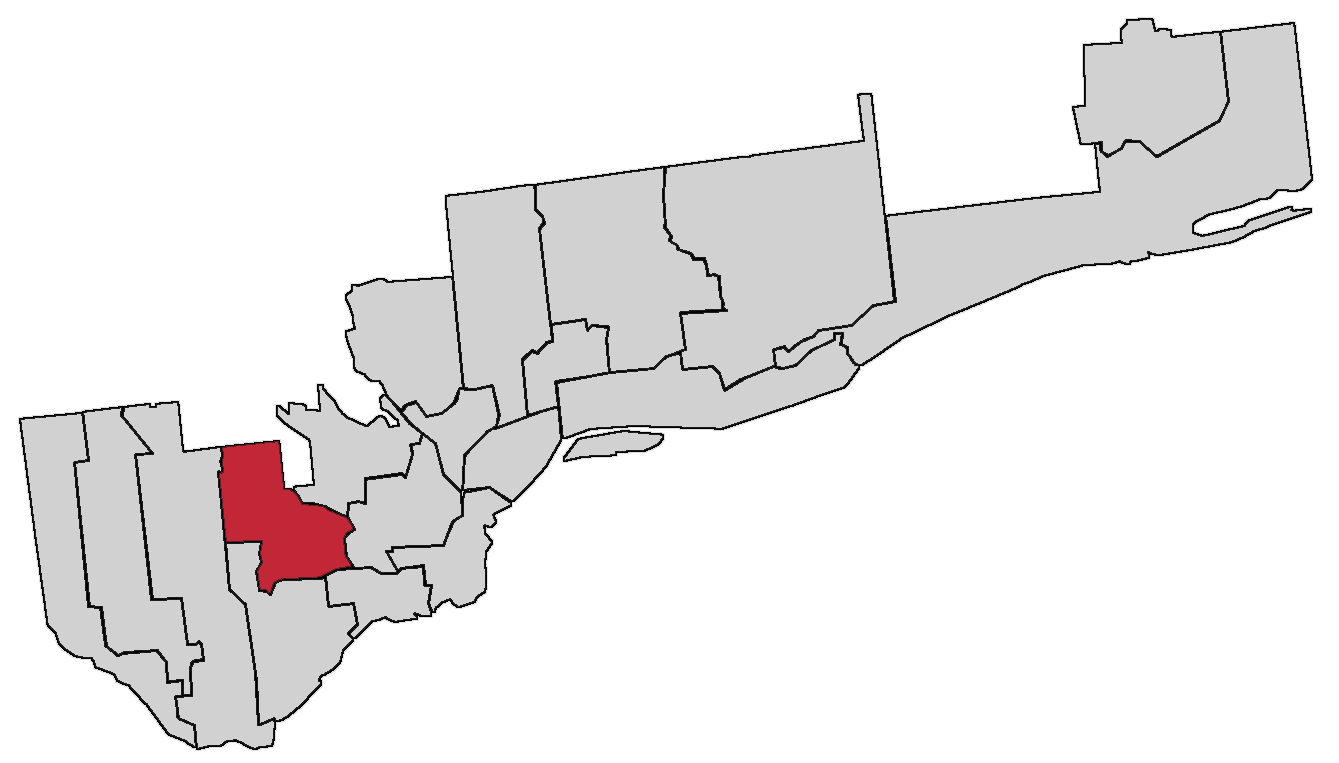
- Location of Plateau District in Gatineau
- City: Gatineau
- Population: 10,313 (2019)
- Area: 13.61 km²

Current constituency
- Created: 2013
Councillor
Bettyna Belizaire
AG
- Sector(s): Aylmer; Hull
- Created from: Parts of: Deschênes District; Plateau–Manoir-des-Trembles District
- First contested: 2013 election
- Last contested: 2021 election

Plateau District (District 4) is a municipal electoral division in the city of Gatineau, Quebec. It is currently served on Gatineau City Council by Bettyna Belizaire of Action Gatineau.

The district spans the Aylmer and Hull sectors of the city, and contains the Plateau neighbourhood.

The district was created for the 2013 election from parts of Deschênes District and Plateau–Manoir-des-Trembles District.

Following the 2021 redistribution, the western half of the Plateau was transferred to the new Mitigomijokan District.

== Councillors ==
Council term	Party	Member
2013–2017	Independent	Maxime Tremblay
2017–2021	Action Gatineau	Maude Marquis-Bissonnette
2021–2025	Action Gatineau	Bettyna Belizaire

== Election results ==
=== 2021 ===
Party	Candidate	Vote	%
Action Gatineau	Bettyna Belizaire	2,351	61.42
Independent	Serge Tonlé	1,477	38.58

=== 2017 ===
2017 Gatineau municipal election: Plateau
Party	Candidate	Popular vote			Expenditures
Party	Candidate	Votes	%	±%	Expenditures
Action Gatineau	Maude Marquis-Bissonnette	Acclaimed	–	–	none listed
Independent	~~Patrick Doyon~~	Withdrew	–	–	none listed
Total valid votes		–	–		
Total rejected, unmarked and declined votes		–	–	–	
Turnout		–	–	–	
Eligible voters		–			
Note: Candidate campaign colours, unless a member of a party, may be based on the prominent colour used in campaign items (signs, literature, etc.) or colours used in polling graphs and are used as a visual differentiation between candidates.
Sources: Office of the City Clerk of Gatineau

=== 2013 ===
Party	Candidate	Vote	%
Independent	Maxime Tremblay (X)	2,435	57.46
Action Gatineau	François Léveillé	1,803	42.54
