= Deschênes District =

Municipal electoral division in Gatineau, Quebec, Canada

Coordinates: 45.393°N 75.812°W

District 3 - Deschênes
- Constituency for the Gatineau City Council
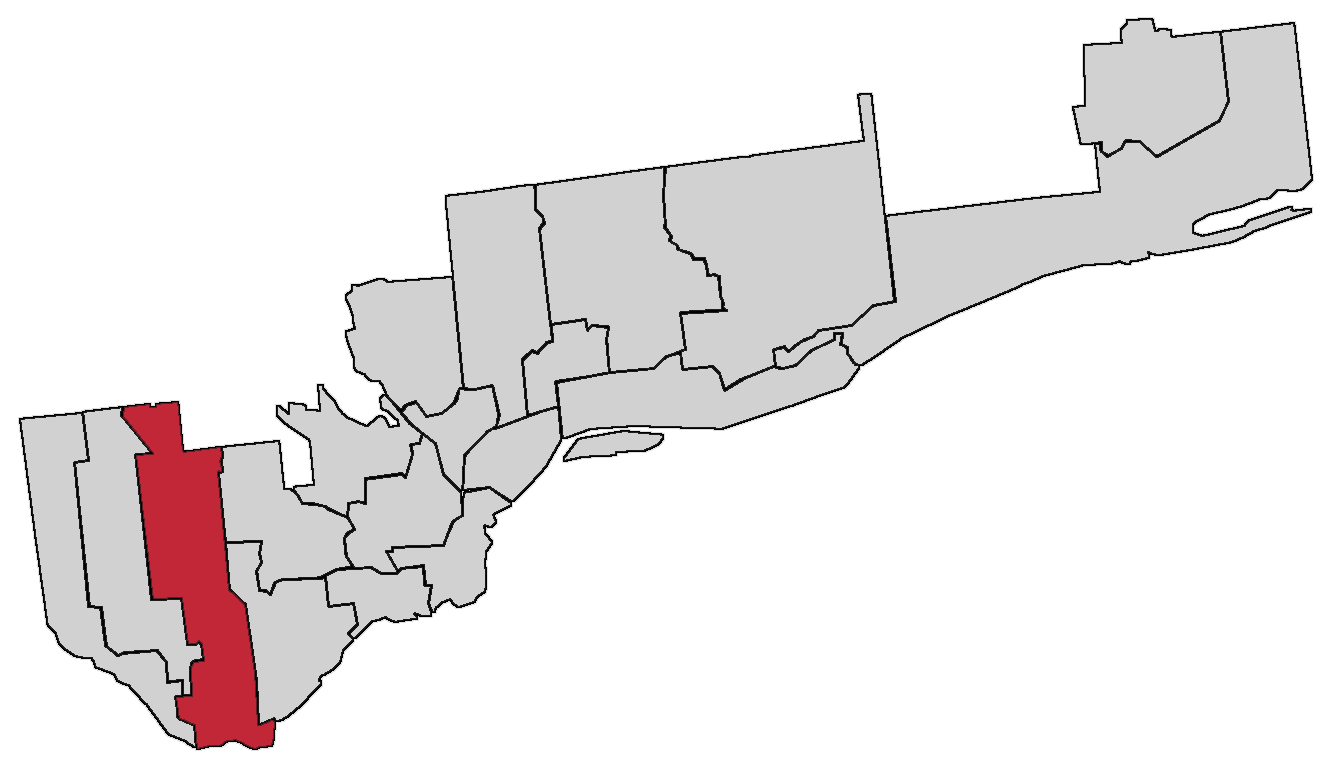
- Location of Deschênes District in Gatineau
- City: Gatineau
- Population: 10,002 (2019)
- Area: 29.79 km²

Current constituency
- Created: 2000
Councillor
Caroline Murray
AG
- Sector(s): Aylmer
- First contested: 2001 election
- Last contested: 2021 election

Deschênes District (District 3) is a municipal electoral division in the city of Gatineau, Quebec. It is represented on Gatineau City Council by Caroline Murray of Action Gatineau.

The district is located in the Aylmer sector of the city. It is one of five districts in the sector.

When the district was created, it included the neighbourhoods of Deschênes, Parc-Champlain, Lakeview-Terrasse, Mountain View, Kilroy Crescent part of Parc-Connaught and a number of new subdivisions in the north and east part of the former city of Aylmer.

In 2013, the District lost some territory to the new Plateau District.

In 2021, the District lost the eastern half of Lakeview-Terrasse, Kilroy Crescent, Mountainview as well as Parc-Champlain to the new Mitigomijokan District.

== Councillors ==
Council term	Party	Member
2002–2005	Independent	André Touchet (Note: Died in office.)
2002–2005	Independent	Richard Jennings
2005–2009	Independent	Alain Riel
2009–2013	Independent	Alain Riel
2013–2017	Action Gatineau	Richard M. Bégin
2017–2021	Independent	Mike Duggan
2021–2025	Action Gatineau	Caroline Murray

== Election results ==
=== 2021 ===
Party	Candidate	Vote	%
Action Gatineau	Caroline Murray	1,808	54.92
Independent	Michel Raymond	1,239	37.64
Independent	Kevin Shannon	245	7.44

=== 2017 ===
Party	Candidate	Vote	%
Independent	Mike Duggan	2,282	53.14
Action Gatineau	Richard M. Bégin	2,012	46.86

=== 2013 ===
Party	Candidate	Vote	%
Action Gatineau	Richard M. Bégin	2,399	54.23
Independent	Alain Riel	2,023	45.73

=== 2009 ===
Candidate	Votes	%
Alain Riel	3,274	81.6
Peter L. Desprès	588	18.4

=== 2005 ===
Candidate	Votes	%
Alain Riel	1,611	33.6
Alain Roy	1,320	27.5
Jerry Alary	1,062	22.1
Michelyn Bélair	805	16.8

=== 2002 by-election ===
A by-election was held on November 24, 2002, after incumbent city councillor André Touchet died on September 11.

2002 Gatineau municipal by-election: Deschênes Death of André Touchet
Party	Candidate	Popular vote			Expenditures
Party	Candidate	Votes	%	±%	Expenditures
Independent	Richard Jennings	1,212	52.11	+15.10	none listed
Independent	Jerry Alary	457	19.65	–	none listed
Independent	Robert Gingras	345	14.83	–	none listed
Independent	Alain Riel	312	13.41	–	none listed
Total valid votes		2,326	100.00		
Total rejected, unmarked and declined votes		0	0.00	-1.07	
Turnout		2,326	26.37	-22.17	
Eligible voters		8,820			
Note: Candidate campaign colours, unless a member of a party, may be based on the prominent colour used in campaign items (signs, literature, etc.) or colours used in polling graphs and are used as a visual differentiation between candidates.
Sources: Office of the City Clerk of Gatineau

=== 2001 ===
2001 Gatineau municipal election: Deschênes
Party	Candidate	Popular vote			Expenditures
Party	Candidate	Votes	%	±%	Expenditures
Independent	André Touchet	1,785	41.83	–	none listed
Independent	Richard Jennings	1,579	37.01	–	none listed
Independent	Suzanne Lloyd	903	21.16	–	none listed
Total valid votes		4,267	98.93		
Total rejected, unmarked and declined votes		46	1.07	–	
Turnout		4,313	48.54	–	
Eligible voters		8,885			
Note: Candidate campaign colours, unless a member of a party, may be based on the prominent colour used in campaign items (signs, literature, etc.) or colours used in polling graphs and are used as a visual differentiation between candidates.
Sources: Office of the City Clerk of Gatineau
