= 2024 Action Gatineau leadership election =

Action Gatineau leadership election

- April 10, 2024
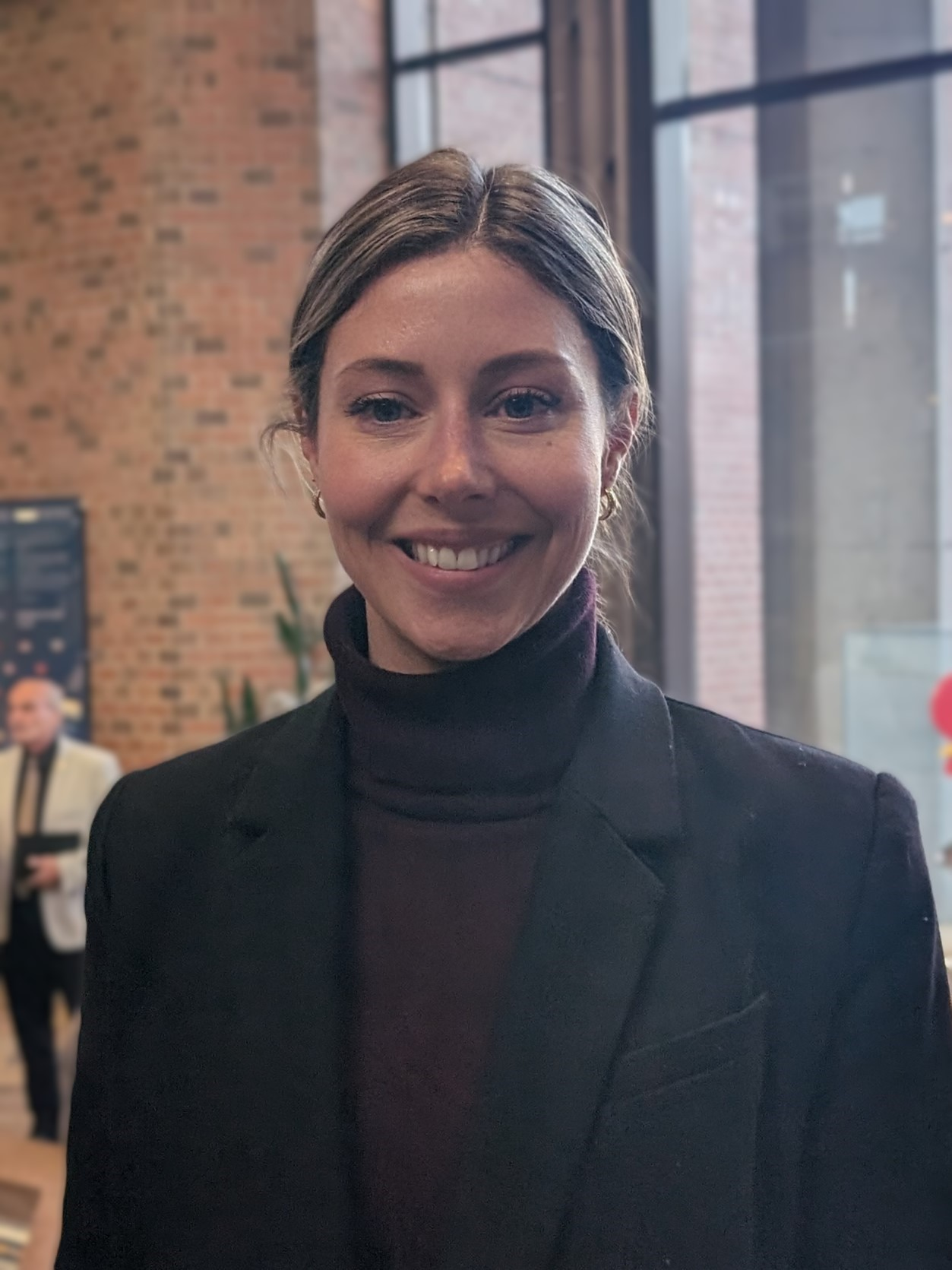
Candidate	Maude Marquis-Bissonnette
District	Plateau (Note: Marquis-Bissonnette was the city councillor for Plateau District from 2017 to 2021.)
Popular vote	Unopposed
Leader before election
Steve Moran (interim)
Elected Leader
Maude Marquis-Bissonnette

2024 Action Gatineau leadership election
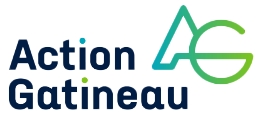
- Date: April 15, 2024
- Resigning leader: Maude Marquis-Bissonnette
- Won by: Maude Marquis-Bissonnette
- Entrance fee: $2,000

The 2024 Action Gatineau leadership election was to take place on April 15, 2024, to elect a leader to replace Maude Marquis-Bissonnette, who resigned on December 22, 2021, after the 2021 Gatineau municipal election, which, despite the party gaining a seat on city council by winning the newly created district of Mitigomijokan, saw Marquis-Bissonnette lose the mayoralty to France Bélisle.

Marquis-Bissonnette won the election on April 10 after no other candidate registered to run.

== Timeline ==
=== 2021 ===
- November 7 – The 2021 municipal election is held, increasing the party's seat count from 7 to 8, but losing the mayoralty.
- December 22 – Party leader Maude Marquis-Bissonnette, who placed second in the mayoral election, announces her resignation.

=== 2022 ===
- January 21 – Steve Moran, city councillor for Hull-Wright District, is named the interim leader of the party until a leadership election is held.

=== 2024 ===
- February 22 – Incumbent Mayor of Gatineau France Bélisle announces her resignation, triggering the 2024 mayoral by-election.
- March 20 – Action Gatineau announces the start of the leadership election and the beginning of the candidate nomination period.
- March 25 – Maude Marquis-Bissonnette declares her candidacy.
- April 8 – End of the candidate nomination period.
- April 10 – Marquis-Bissonnette is acclaimed party leader.

== Candidates ==
=== Declared ===
==== Maude Marquis-Bissonnette ====
Maude Marquis-Bissonnette was the runner-up in the 2021 Gatineau municipal election who was the party's leader until she resigned following her loss. She was the city councillor for Plateau District from 2017–2021. After leaving politics, she became an associate professor at the École nationale d’administration publique.

Candidacy announced: March 25, 2024
Candidacy registered: March 25, 2024

=== Declined ===
- Alicia Brunet-Lacasse, city councillor for Bellevue District (2021–present)
- Bettyna Belizaire, city councillor for Plateau District (2021–present) (endorsed Marquis-Bissonnette)
- Anik Des Marais, city councillor for Mitigomijokan District (2021–present)
- Isabelle N. Miron, city councillor for Orée-du-Parc District (2017–present)
- Steve Moran, interim leader of Action Gatineau (2022–present) and city councillor for Hull–Wright District (2021–present)
- Caroline Murray, city councillor for Deschênes District (2021–present)
- Tiffany-Lee Norris Parent, city councillor for Touraine District (2021–present)
- Maxime Pedneaud-Jobin, former Mayor of Gatineau (2013–2021), former leader of Action Gatineau (2012–2021) and former city councillor for Buckingham District (2009–2013) (endorsed Marquis-Bissonnette)
- Louis Sabourin, city councillor for Limbour District (2021–present)
