= 2024 Gatineau mayoral by-election =

Municipal election in Quebec, Canada

- June 9, 2024
- Registered: 203,032
- Turnout: 33.06% (▼2.04pp)
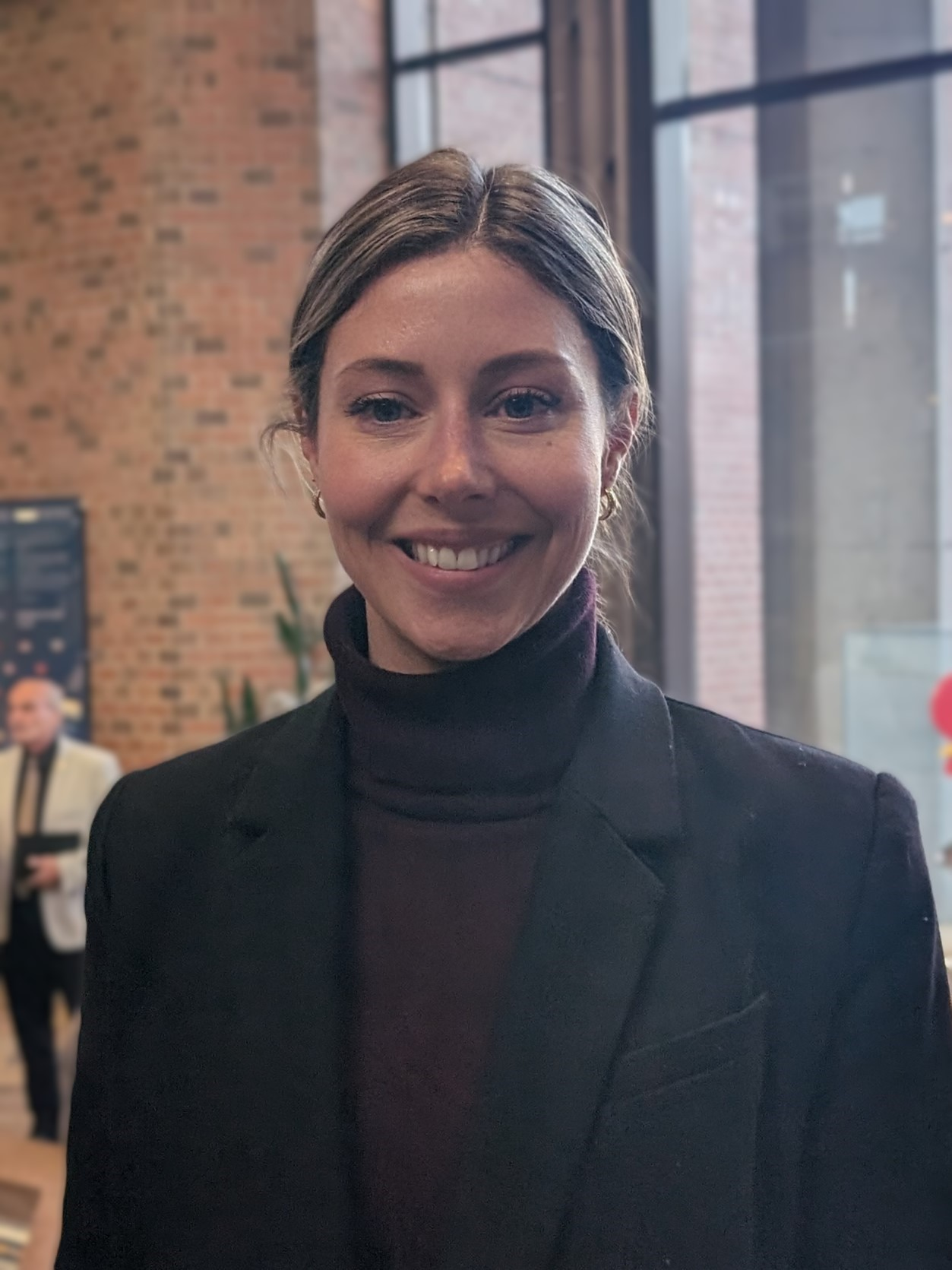

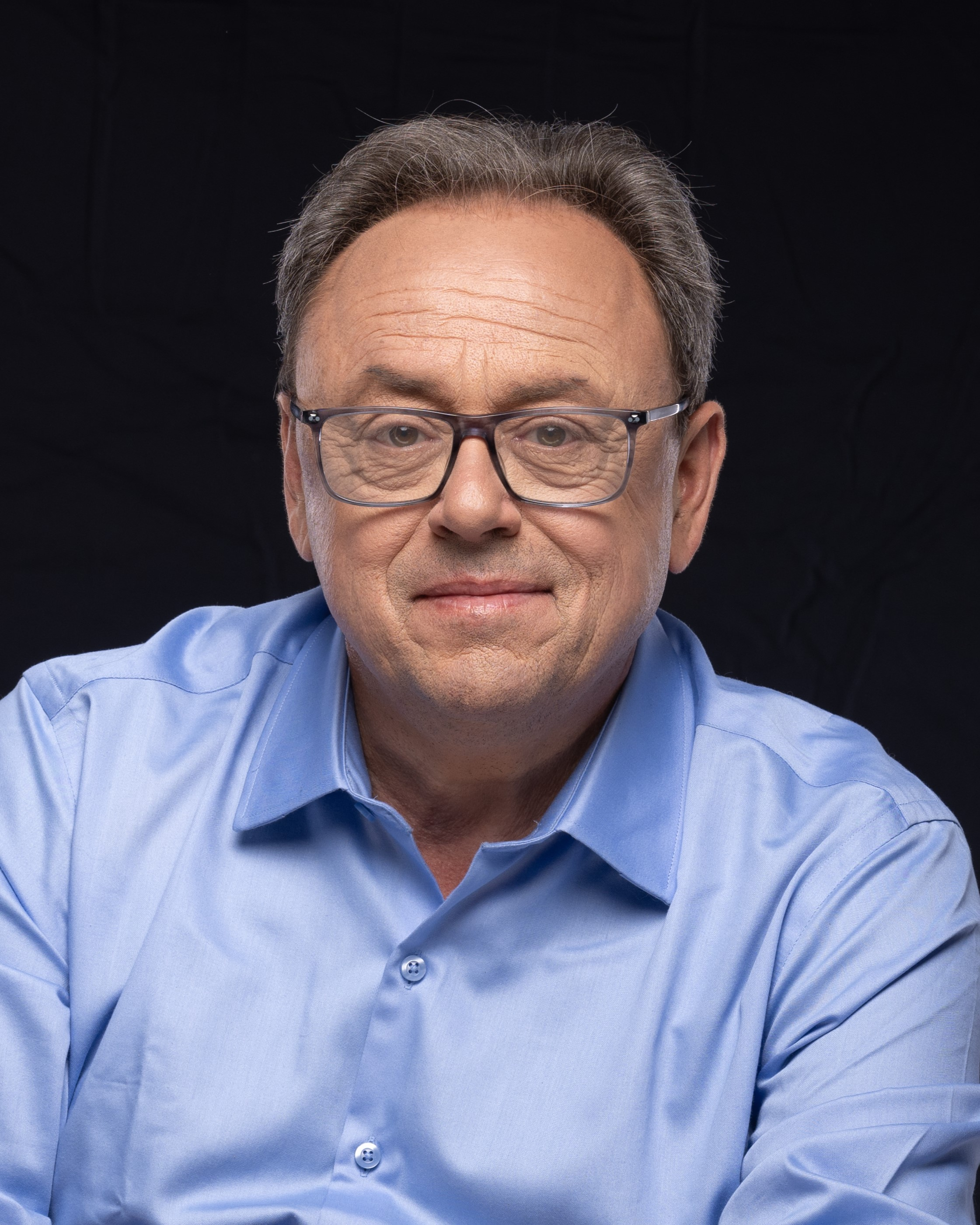

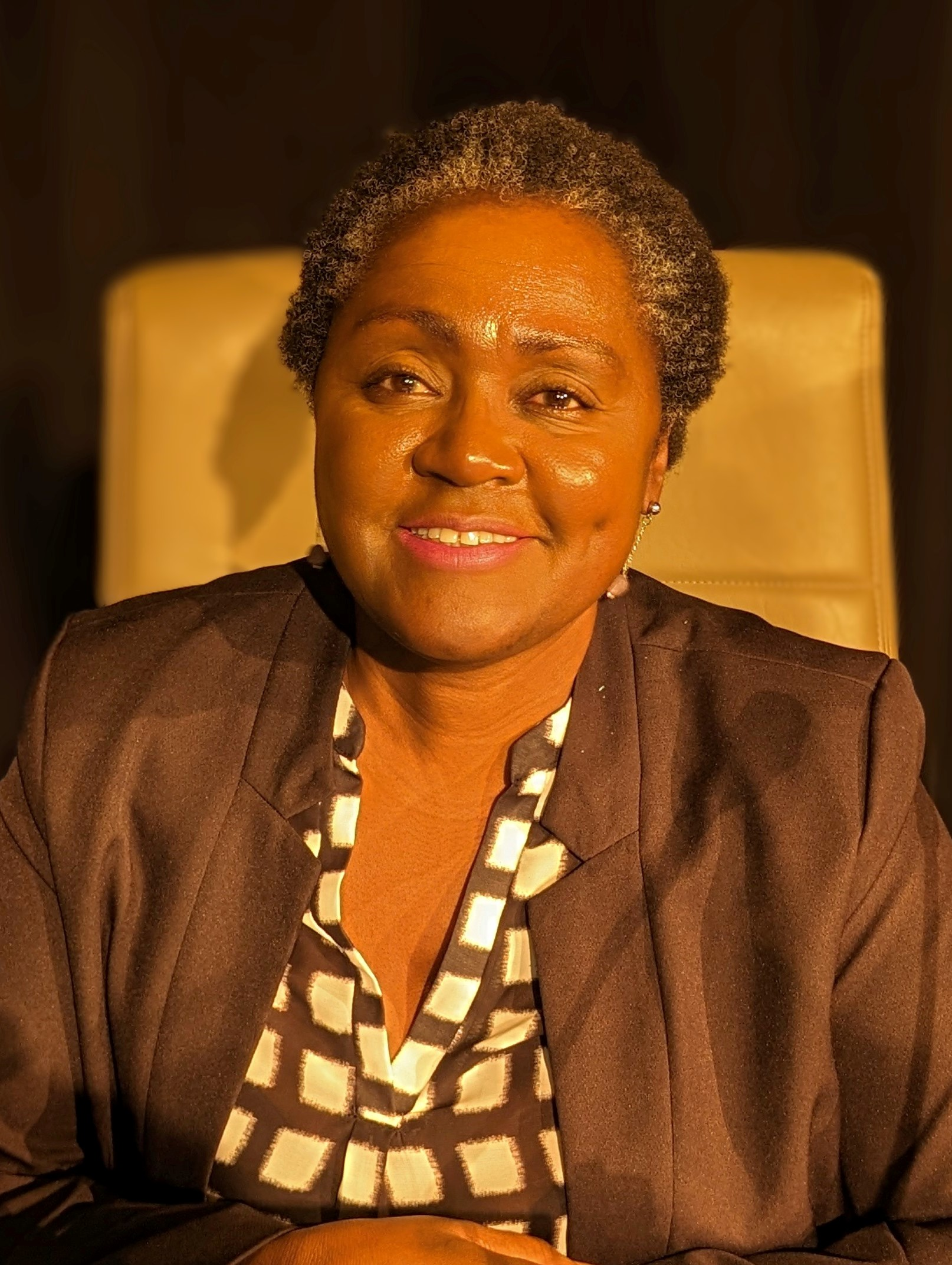

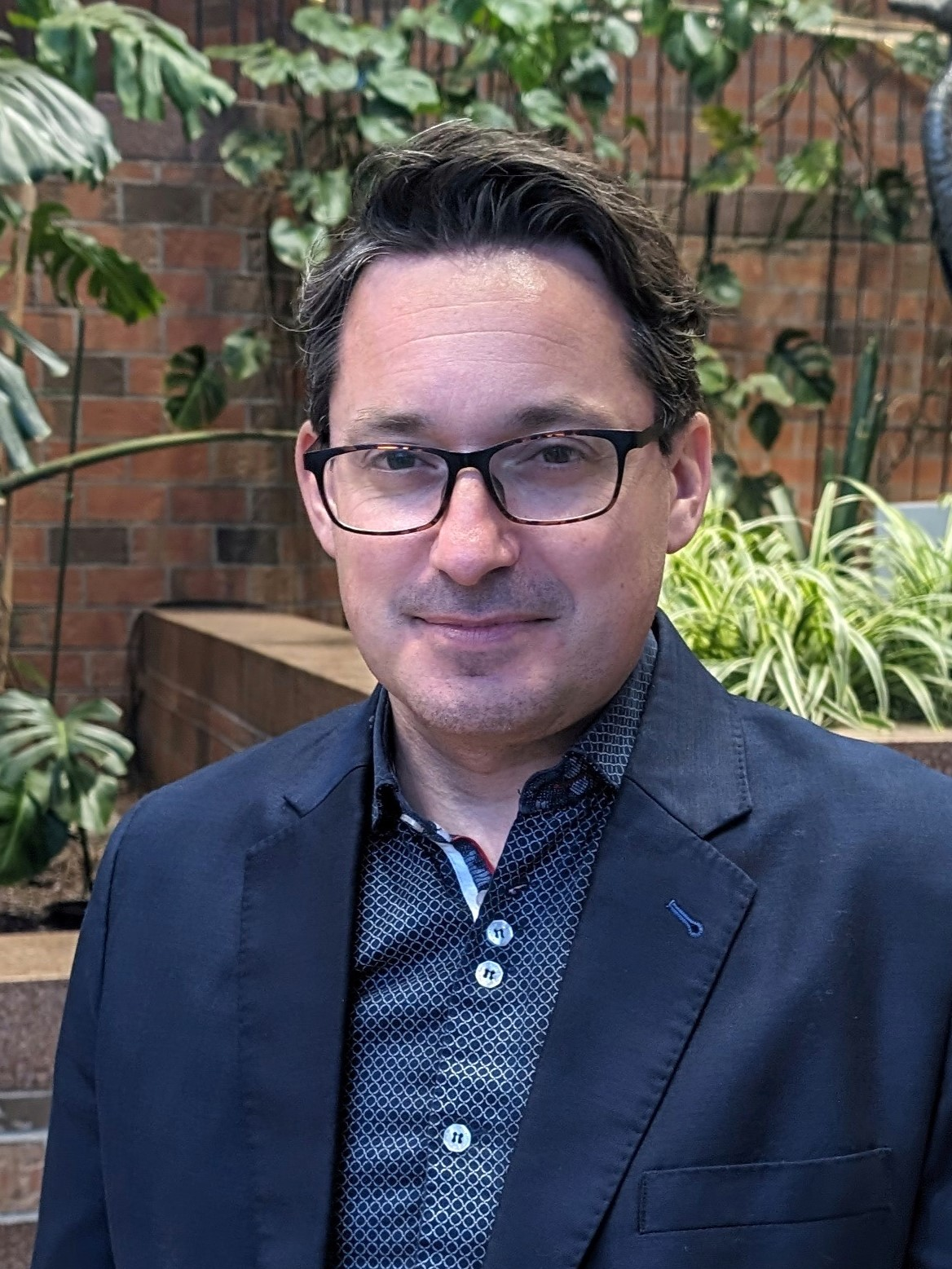
Candidate	Maude Marquis-Bissonnette	Yves Ducharme	Olive Kamanyana
Party	Action Gatineau	Independent	Independent
Popular vote	27,833	20,600	7,253
Percentage	41.70%	30.87%	10.87%
		SB
Candidate	Daniel Feeny	Stéphane Bisson
Party	Independent	Independent
Popular vote	6,539	3,580
Percentage	9.80%	5.36%
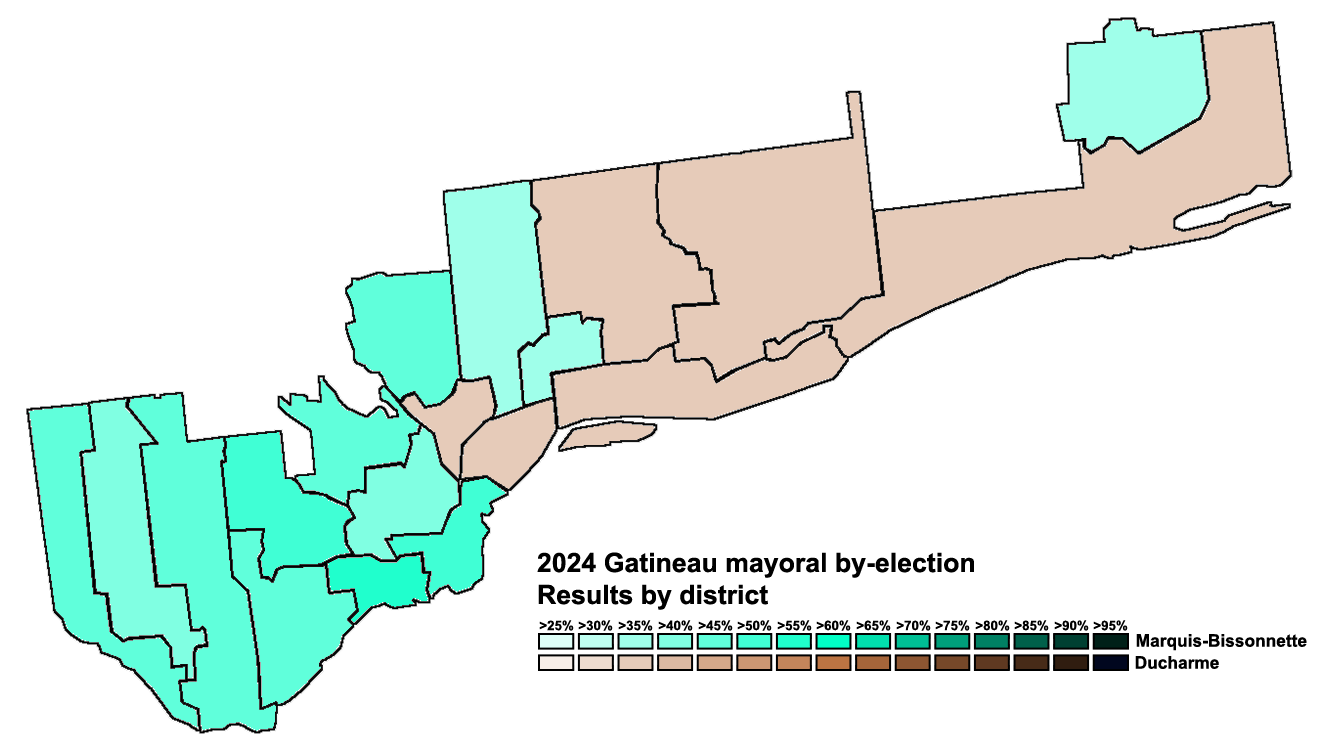
- Results by district
Mayor before election
Daniel Champagne (acting) (Note: France Bélisle, who was elected as Mayor of Gatineau in 2021, resigned on February 22, 2024.)
Independent
Elected mayor
Maude Marquis-Bissonnette
Action Gatineau

The 2024 Gatineau mayoral by-election was held on June 9, 2024, to elect the 23rd mayor of Gatineau, Quebec, Canada, to serve the remainder of the 2021 to 2025 term following the resignation of mayor France Bélisle, who resigned effective immediately on February 22, 2024, citing a toxic political environment and death threats.

Maude Marquis-Bissonnette of Action Gatineau won the election with 41.7 percent of the vote. She became the first mayor of modern Gatineau to be elected in a by-election and the first since Guy Lacroix's by-election victory in 1994 following the resignation of Robert Labine.

== Background ==
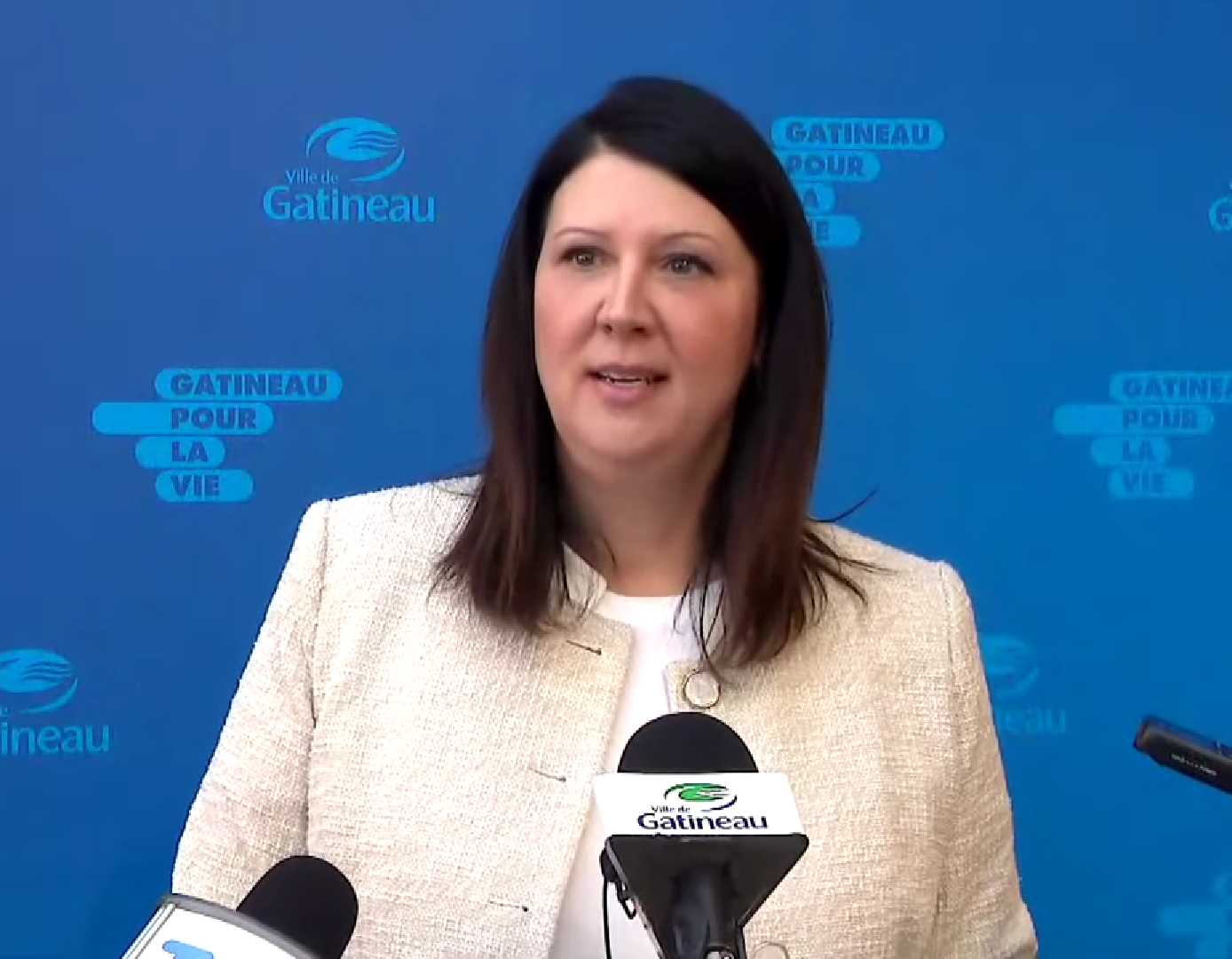
Bélisle announcing her resignation on February 22, 2024

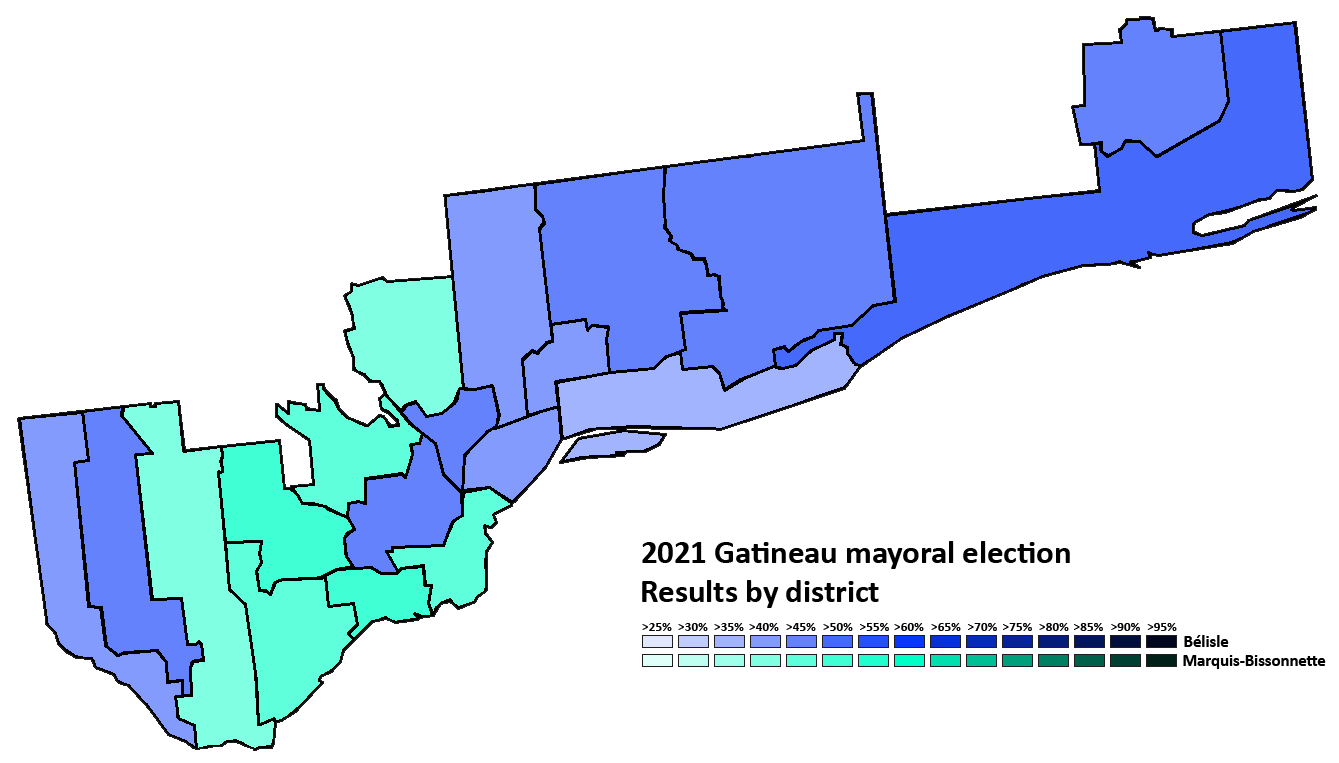
A map showing the results of the 2021 mayoral election

=== Resignation of France Bélisle and subsequent vacancy ===
Bélisle was first elected in the 2021 mayoral election, becoming the first female mayor of Gatineau. She called for a press conference on February 22, 2024, to discuss her future in politics. At the conference, which saw Mike Duggan, city councillor for Pointe-Gatineau District as the only other elected official in attendance, she announced that she would not be forming a municipal political party nor team and that she would be resigning as mayor effective immediately. Reactions from Quebec City Mayor Bruno Marchand, Montreal Mayor Valérie Plante, Sherbrooke Mayor Évelyne Beaudin, and Ottawa Mayor Mark Sutcliffe, among others, came in praising Bélisle for her openness and resilience, while some noted their sadness with the situation. Daniel Champagne, the incumbent city councillor for Versant District who was appointed as deputy mayor just days prior, was appointed to serve as mayor in accordance with the Cities and Towns Act.

=== Rumours of a new party ===
As early as 2022, there have been rumours of a second political party forming in Gatineau ahead of the 2025 municipal election. This stems from arguments from Independent city councillors and commentators about the advantages that Action Gatineau has as a political party compared to candidates without party affiliation. The first of these rumblings came from city councillor for Buckingham District Edmond Leclerc, who in October 2022 mused with the idea of creating a political party alongside fellow city councillor Steven Boivin. In addition, then-Mayor Bélisle mused with the idea of forming a political party prior to her resignation from the mayoralty. Former city councillor and the daughter of former mayor Marc Bureau, Audrey Bureau, was rumoured to be considering forming her own political party ahead of a potential candidacy in the by-election prior to her bowing out.

=== By-election process ===
As Bélisle resigned with more than 12 months left in her term, according to the Act Respecting Elections and Referendums in Municipalities, a by-election must be held to replace her. The by-election must occur within four months of the notice of vacancy, within which the city clerk, who acts as chief electoral officer in municipal elections in Gatineau, must fix a Sunday as the by-election date. Candidates who are members of the city council at the time of filing their candidacy must also resign their position in order to run in the by-election.

On February 27, 2024, city clerk Véronique Denis announced that the by-election would occur on June 9, 2024, and that advance voting would occur on June 2. The candidate nomination period will take place from April 26 to May 10. The city clerk's office estimated that the by-election would cost upwards of $2 million.

=== Timeline ===
==== 2021 ====
- November 16 – France Bélisle was elected Mayor of Gatineau, becoming its first female mayor.

==== 2024 ====
- February 22 – Bélisle announces that she will be resigning as Mayor, effective immediately.
- February 27 – City Clerk Véronique Denis announces the official timeline for the by-election.
- March 4 – City councillor Olive Kamanyana announces her candidacy.
- March 11 – Businessman Jacques Bélanger announces his candidacy.
- March 16 - Former PPC candidate for Gatineau Mathieu Saint-Jean announces his candidacy.
- March 18 – Former spokesperson for France Bélisle Daniel Feeny announces his candidacy.
- March 27 – Former President of the Gatineau Chamber of Commerce Stéphane Bisson announces his candidacy.
- April 10 – Former city councillor and 2021 mayoral candidate Maude Marquis-Bissonnette is acclaimed party leader in the Action Gatineau leadership election, becoming the party's candidate in the by-election.
- April 12 – Former mayor Yves Ducharme unofficially announces his candidacy on LinkedIn, and former mayoral candidate Rémi Bergeron officially announces his candidacy.
- April 15 – Ducharme holds a press conference to officially announce his candidacy.
- April 18 – Bélanger announces his withdrawal from the race and endorses Ducharme's candidacy.
- April 26 – Candidate nomination period opens.
- May 10 – Candidate nomination period closes.
- By May 10 – The list of electors will be published, pending revision.
- Between May 10 and May 30 – Revision dates for the list of electors.
- June 2 – Advance polling opens.
- June 9 – Election day.

== Candidates ==
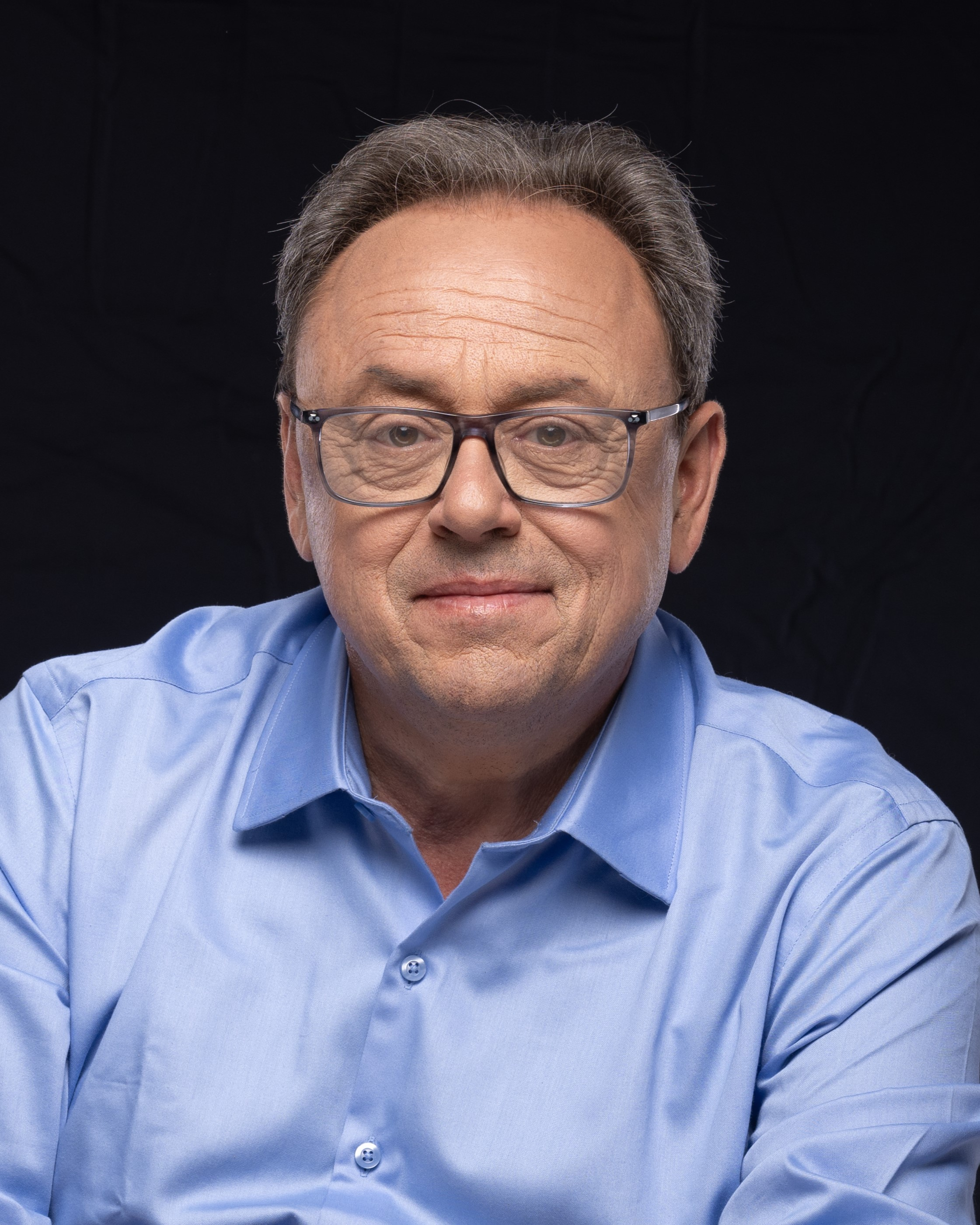
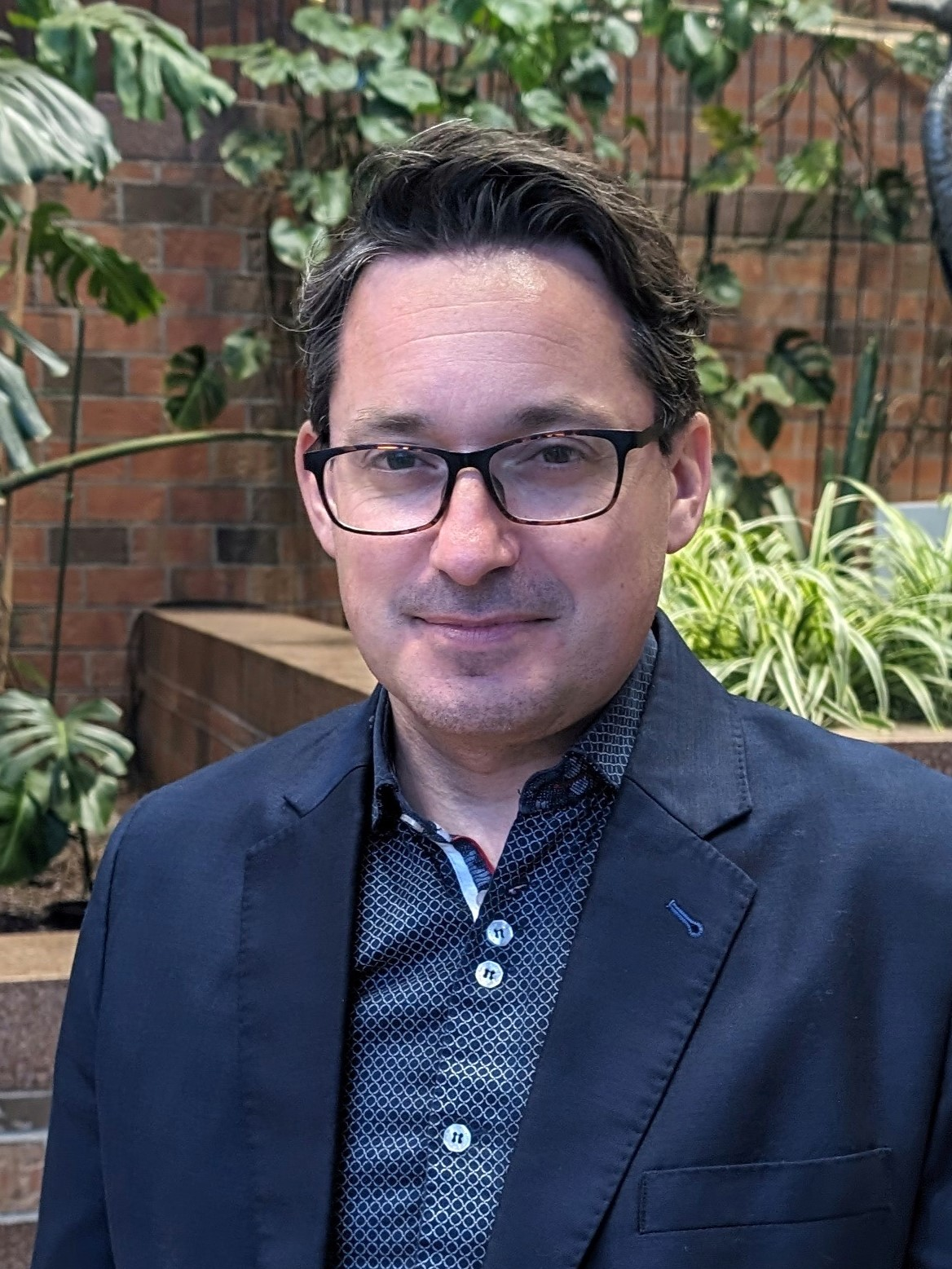
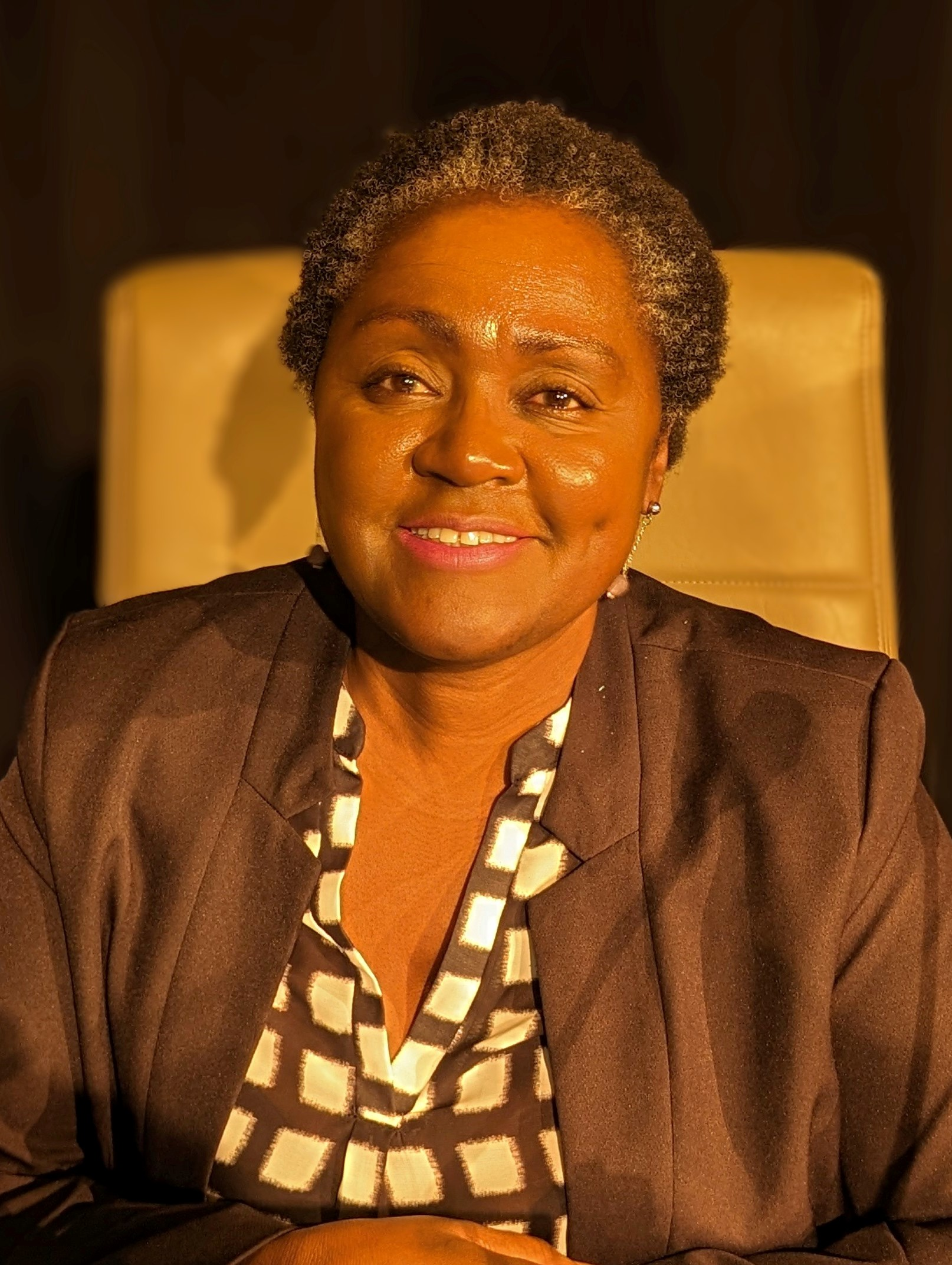
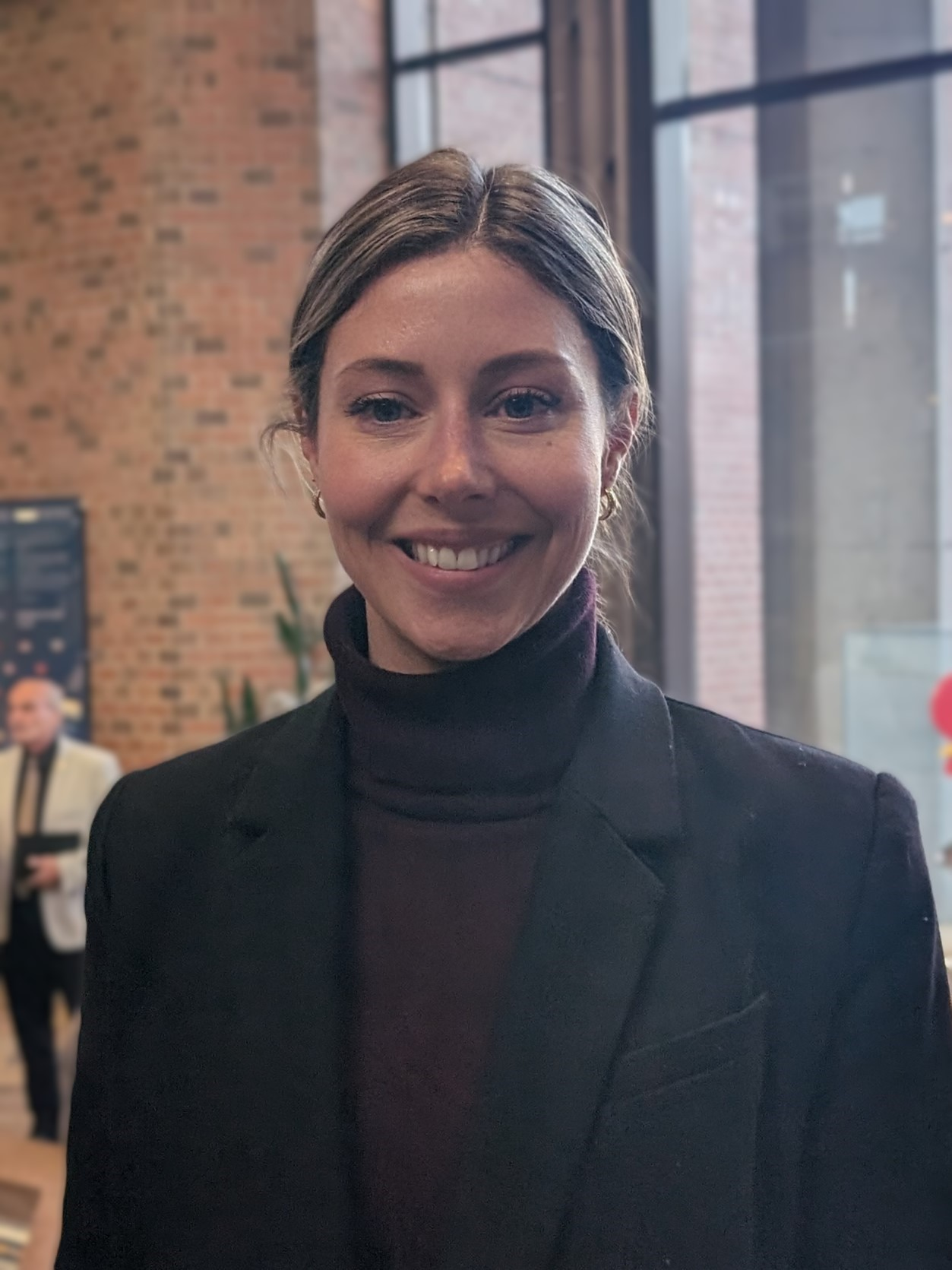
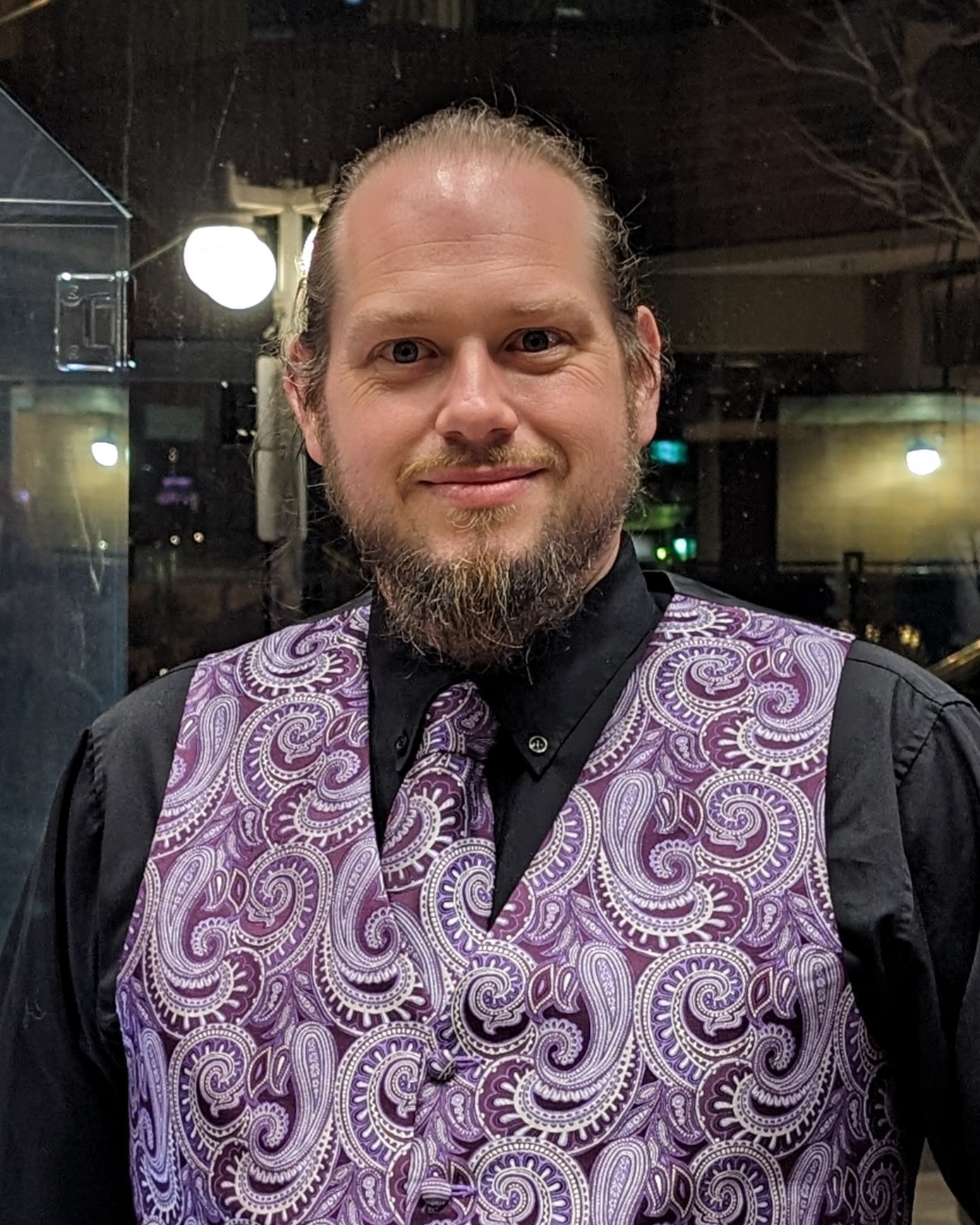
Candidates for the 2024 mayoral by-election. From left to right: Ducharme, Feeny, Kamanyana, Marquis-Bissonnette, Saint-Jean.

=== Declared ===
==== Rémi Bergeron ====
Rémi Bergeron is a high school teacher who was the general manager of Bowman, Quebec from 2016 to 2018 and a candidate for mayor in the 2017 and 2021 mayoral elections.

Party affiliation: Independent
Candidacy announced: April 12, 2024
Candidacy registered: May 9, 2024
Campaign slogan (French): Des solutions pour vous
Campaign slogan (English; unofficial): Solutions for you

==== Stéphane Bisson ====
Campaign logo

Stéphane Bisson is a real estate broker who previously served as the President of the Gatineau Chamber of Commerce from 2021 to 2024, when he resigned to ensure no conflicts of interest arose while he was considering running for Mayor.

Party affiliation: Independent
Candidacy announced: March 27, 2024
Candidacy registered: April 26, 2024
Campaign website: stephanegatineau.ca
Campaign slogan (French): Ensemble pour notre ville
Campaign slogan (English): Together for our city

==== Yves Ducharme ====
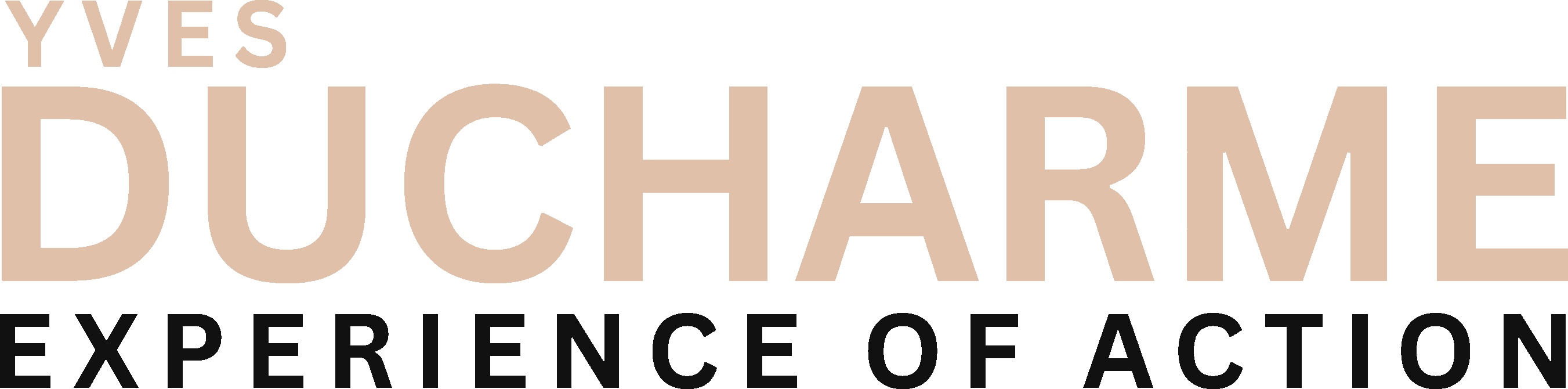
Campaign logo

Yves Ducharme, 65, is a consultant and businessman who was the Mayor of Gatineau from 2002 to 2005, and Mayor of Hull from 1992 to 2001. Prior to entering the race, he was the Director of Commercial Development for Brigil, and was a candidate for the federal Liberal nomination in Hull—Aylmer in 2015.

Party affiliation: Independent
Candidacy announced: April 12, 2024
Candidacy registered: May 8, 2024
Campaign website: www.yvesducharme.com
Campaign slogan (French): L'expérience d'agir
Campaign slogan (English): Experience of action

==== Daniel Feeny ====
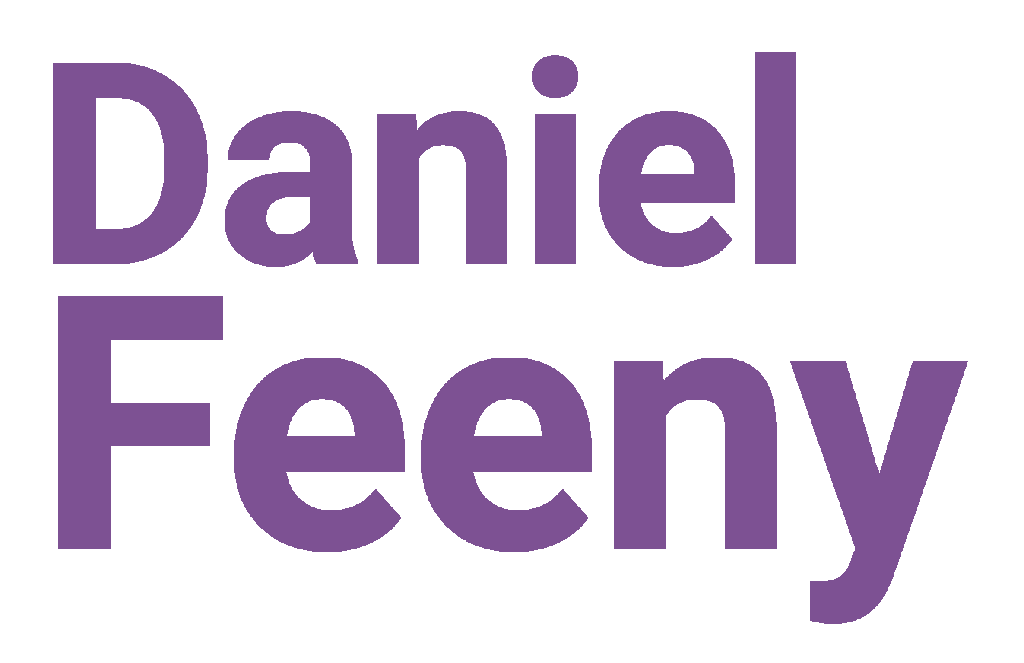
Campaign logo

Daniel Feeny is a marketing expert who served as the spokesperson and Director of Communications and Intergovernmental Relations for former Mayor France Bélisle from 2021 to 2024. Prior to entering politics, he was the director of marketing for the National Capital Commission and a manager at the Department of Canadian Heritage in the Government of Canada.

Party affiliation: Independent
Candidacy announced: March 18, 2024
Candidacy registered: May 10, 2024
Campaign website: votezdaniel.ca
Campaign slogan (French): Branché sur Gatineau!
Campaign slogan (English): Connected on Gatineau!

==== Olive Kamanyana ====
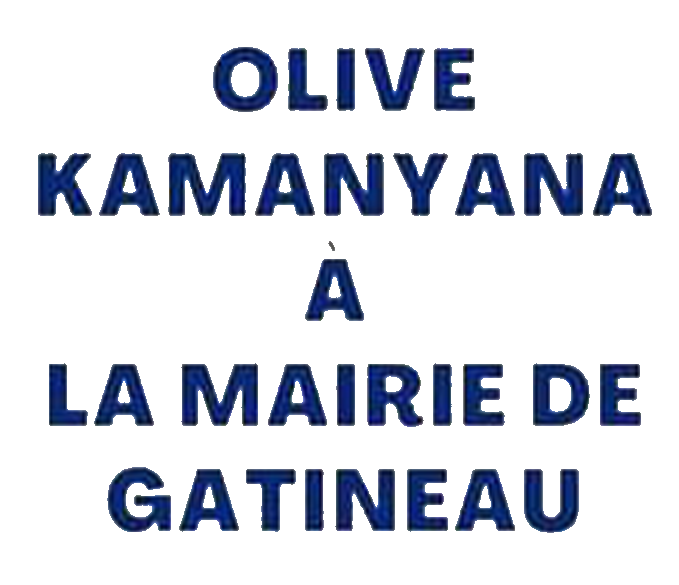
Campaign logo

Olive Kamanyana is the former city councillor for the Carrefour-de-l'Hôpital District, having been elected in the 2021 municipal election. She was also the 2018 provincial Coalition Avenir Quebec candidate in Pontiac. Prior to entering politics, Kamanyana was a researcher, holding a PhD in Applied Social Sciences from Université du Québec en Outaouais and an MA and BA from Université Laval.

Party affiliation: Independent
Candidacy announced: March 4, 2024
Candidacy registered: May 4, 2024
Campaign website: olivemairiegatineau.ca
Campaign slogan (French): Pour un leadership rassembleur
Campaign slogan (English; unofficial): For leadership that brings people together

==== Maude Marquis-Bissonnette ====
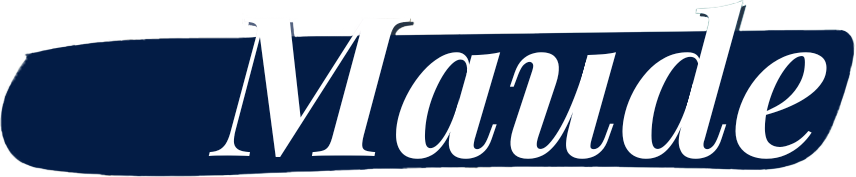
Campaign logo

Maude Marquis-Bissonnette is a university professor who was the runner-up in the 2021 Gatineau municipal election. She was the leader of Action Gatineau from April–December 2021 until she resigned following her loss; she was also the city councillor for Plateau District from 2017 to 2021. After leaving politics, she became an associate professor at the École nationale d’administration publique.

Party affiliation: Action Gatineau
Candidacy announced: April 10, 2024
Candidacy registered: April 26, 2024
Campaign website: actiongatineau.org/equipe/maude-marquis-bissonnette/
Campaign slogan (French): Je vote Maude!
Campaign slogan (English; unofficial): I'm voting Maude!

==== Mathieu Saint-Jean ====
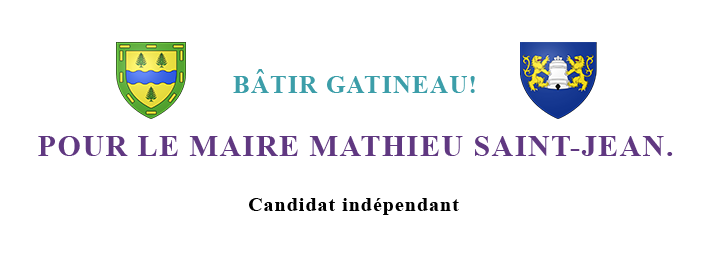
Campaign logo

Mathieu Saint-Jean is a customer service expert who was the People's Party candidate in Gatineau in 2021.

Party affiliation: Independent (Note: Saint-Jean has been using the name Équipe citoyenne de Gatineau as part of the group for his campaign.)
Candidacy announced: March 16, 2024
Candidacy registered: April 26, 2024
Campaign website: mathieusaintjean.ca
Campaign slogan (French): Bâtir Gatineau!
Campaign slogan (English; unofficial): Build Gatineau!

=== Withdrawn ===
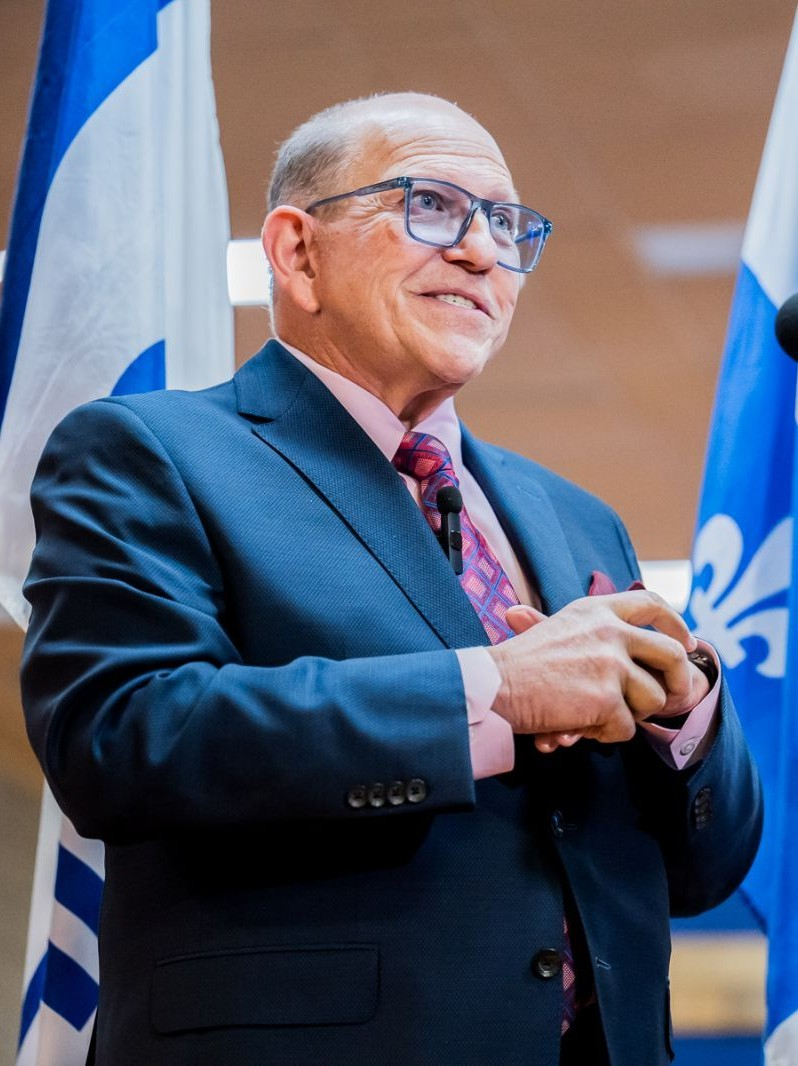
Bélanger in 2024.

==== Jacques Bélanger ====
Jacques Bélanger is a businessman and entrepreneur who is the owner of Top Karting, a go-kart track in the Hull sector. His campaign was endorsed by councillor Mike Duggan prior to his withdrawal from the race.

Party affiliation: Independent (Note: Bélanger had registered the political party name Vision Gatineau, and had stated that he would have formed the party should Action Gatineau posed a challenge to his policy agenda.)
Candidacy announced: March 11, 2024
Candidacy withdrawn: April 18, 2024
Endorsed: Yves Ducharme
Campaign slogan (French): Une vision. Une grande ville.
Campaign slogan (English; unofficial): One vision. One great city.

=== Declined ===
- Mario Aubé (Independent), city councillor for Masson-Angers District (2021–present) (endorsed Ducharme)
- Dave Blackburn (Independent), Université du Québec en Outaouais professor and Canadian Armed Forces veteran; 2019 federal Conservative candidate in Pontiac
- Jocelyn Blondin (Independent), city councillor for Manoir-des-Trembles–Val-Tétreau District (2013–present) (endorsed Ducharme)
- Steven Boivin (Independent), Speaker of the Gatineau City Council and city councillor for Aylmer District (2021–present)
- Audrey Bureau (Independent), former city councillor for Aylmer District (2017–2021); daughter of city councillor and former Mayor Marc Bureau
- Marc Bureau (Independent), city councillor for Parc-de-la-Montagne–Saint-Raymond District (2022–present); former Mayor of Gatineau (2005–2013)
- Gilles Chagnon (Independent), city councillor for Lucerne District (2017–present) (endorsed Ducharme)
- Daniel Champagne (Independent), acting Mayor (2024) and city councillor for Versant District (2013–present)
- Mike Duggan (Independent), city councillor for Pointe-Gatineau District (2021–present); former city councillor for Deschênes District (2017–2021) and Lucerne District (2013–2017); 2019 federal Conservative candidate in Hull—Aylmer (endorsed Bélanger, then Ducharme)
- Denis Girouard (Independent), city councillor for Lac-Beauchamp District (2021–present) (endorsed Ducharme)
- Sylvie Goneau (Independent), third-place finisher in the 2017 mayoral election and former city councillor for Bellevue District (2009–2017); 2019 federal Conservative candidate in Gatineau
- Edmond Leclerc (Independent), city councillor for Buckingham District (2021–present)
- Jean Lessard (Independent), city councillor for Rivière-Blanche District (2013–present) (endorsed Ducharme)
- Steve Moran (Action Gatineau), city councillor for Hull–Wright District (2021–present); former interim leader of Action Gatineau (2022–2024) (endorsed Marquis-Bissonnette)
- Caroline Murray (Action Gatineau), city councillor for Deschênes District (2021–present) (endorsed Marquis-Bissonnette)
- Tiffany-Lee Norris Parent (Action Gatineau), city councillor for Touraine District (2021–present) (endorsed Marquis-Bissonnette)
- Maxime Pedneaud-Jobin (Action Gatineau), former Mayor of Gatineau (2013-2021), former leader of Action Gatineau (2012-2021) and former city councillor for Buckingham District (2009-2013) (endorsed Marquis-Bissonnette)
- Louis Sabourin (Action Gatineau), city councillor for Limbour District (2021–present) (endorsed Marquis-Bissonnette)

== Issues ==
2024 Gatineau mayoral by-election – issues and respective platforms
Issue	~~Bélanger~~ (Note: Has withdrawn their candidacy.)	Bergeron	Bisson	Ducharme	Feeny	Kamanyana	Marquis-Bissonnette	Saint-Jean
Budget								
City Hall	~~End the "dictatorship" that's paralyzing municipal politics.~~							
Economy	~~Boost economic prosperity in the city by introducing low-cost flights at the Gatineau-Ottawa Executive Airport to increase the number of people frequenting the city.~~							Implement a food sovereignty policy citywide.
Emergency Services					Stray from the policing policies implemented by former Mayor France Bélisle.			
Energy and Environment	~~Pressure the Government of Quebec to collaborate with the city to find solutions to keeping residents safe from flooding.~~				Improve communications about flooding issues with residents, and collaborate with the Government of Quebec to find solutions to flooding.	Create a city-wide scientific council. Kickstart various riverbank clean-up projects. Analyse flood zones on a neighborhood-by-neighborhood basis to find solutions to protect residents.	Hold consultations with residents about figuring out the best solutions to fight floods.	
Healthcare								
Housing	~~Implement tax credits for developers to construct low-cost housing.~~ ~~Oppose the construction of housing on the site of the Robert Guertin Centre.~~				Continue the housing policies implemented by former Mayor France Bélisle.			
Infrastructure								
Recreation and Tourism	~~Build sports complexes for soccer and deck hockey in the three corners of the city for recreational and tourism purposes.~~							
Regulation and Zoning								
Social Assistance	~~Construct low-cost housing that will be able to house the homeless.~~				Continue the homelessness policies implemented by former Mayor France Bélisle.	Develop and implement various diversity and inclusion programs.		Change the perception of homelessness and provide support to those who desire assistance in getting back on their feet.
Taxation	~~Stabilize municipal tax through revenues gained by expanding operations at the Gatineau-Ottawa Executive Airport to include low-cost commercial flights.~~							
Transportation								
Waste Management								

== Endorsements ==
	Bergeron	Bisson	Ducharme	Feeny	Kamanyana	Marquis-Bissonnette	Saint-Jean
City councillors			Mario Aubé; Jocelyn Blondin; Gilles Chagnon; Mike Duggan; Denis Girouard; Jean Lessard			Bettyna Belizaire; Alicia Brunet-Lacasse; Anik Des Marais; Steve Moran; Caroline Murray; Tiffany-Lee Norris Parent; Louis Sabourin	
Federal politicians							Maxime Bernier
Provincial politicians							
Former politicians			Roch Cholette (Former Liberal MNA for Hull)	France Bélisle (Former Mayor of Gatineau)		Maxime Pedneaud-Jobin (Former Mayor of Gatineau)	
Media							
Other			Jacques Bélanger (Businessman and former candidate)			Larry Rousseau (Canadian Labour Congress; Executive Vice President)	

== Debates and forums ==
Debates and forums among candidates for the 2024 Gatineau mayoral by-election
No.	Date	Location	Host	Language	Key: P Participant A Absent N Non-invitee I Invitee TBD To be determined O Out of race (not declared/withdrawn/disqualified)								References
No.	Date	Location	Host	Language	Bélanger	Bergeron	Bisson	Ducharme	Feeny	Kamanyana	Marquis-Bissonnette	Saint-Jean	References
1	March 24, 2024	Hull	Sylvain Henry	French	P	O	O	O	P	P	O	P	
2	May 15, 2024	Casino du Lac-Leamy	Multivesco; Gatineau Chamber of Commerce; 104.7 Outaouais	French	O	N	P	P	P	P	P	N	
3	May 16, 2024	Aylmer	Blue Regard; LeaderPol	French	O	P	A	A	P	P	P	P	
4	May 21, 2024	Buckingham	Regroupement des gens d’affaires de la Basse-Lièvre	French	O	P	P	P	P	P	P	P	
5	May 27, 2024	Hull	CRIO; FOHO; TROCAO; TROVEPO	French	O	P	P	P	P	P	P	P	
6	May 28, 2024	Aylmer	Aylmer Bulletin	French	O	P	P	P	P	P	P	P	
7	June 4, 2024	Hull	104.7 Outaouais	French	O	N	P	P	N	P	P	N	

== Campaign ==
The period prior to the campaign had been marred by various issues, particularly due to the abundance of independent candidates declaring their intent to run for the office, that there would be enough vote-splitting to allow the candidate for Action Gatineau, Maude Marquis-Bissonnette, to win the mayoralty. This ended up being the reason why certain candidates chose not to enter the race, including former 2017 mayoral candidate Sylvie Goneau. Suggestions that there be an alliance formed among candidates have been quashed, with only Jacques Bélanger suggesting that he would be open to the idea of allying with another candidate who could see eye-to-eye with him on the issues that are affecting the city. Bélanger would later drop out and rally behind Yves Ducharme.

=== Polling ===
Polling firm	Source	Last date of polling	Sample Size (Note: Key: DV – decided voters AV – all voters)	MoE	Rémi Bergeron	Stéphane Bisson	Yves Ducharme	Daniel Feeny	Olive Kamanyana	Maude Marquis-Bissonnette	Mathieu Saint-Jean
Segma Recherche	HTML	May 29, 2024	1,000	± 3.1%	2%	11%	23%	9%	14%	37%	1%
Segma Recherche	HTML	May 2, 2024	600	± 4%	0%	12%	27%	7%	13%	38%	3%

== Results ==
2024 Gatineau mayoral by-election Resignation of France Bélisle
Party	Candidate	Popular vote			Expenditures
Party	Candidate	Votes	%	±%	Expenditures
Action Gatineau	Maude Marquis-Bissonnette	27,833	41.70	+4.02	$85,881.58
Independent	Yves Ducharme	20,600	30.87	–	$77,670.15
Independent	Olive Kamanyana	7,253	10.87	–	$71,819.69
Independent	Daniel Feeny	6,539	9.80	–	$26,187.70
Independent	Stéphane Bisson	3,580	5.36	–	$27,090.54
Independent	Rémi Bergeron	499	0.75	-0.26	$0.00
Independent	Mathieu Saint-Jean	435	0.65	–	$463.31
Total valid votes		66,739	99.44		
Total rejected, unmarked and declined votes		379	0.56	-0.19	
Turnout		67,118	33.06	-2.05	
Eligible voters		203,032			
Note: Candidate campaign colours, unless a member of a party, are based on the prominent colour used in campaign items (signs, literature, etc.) or colours used in polling graphs and are used as a visual differentiation between candidates.
Sources: Office of the City Clerk of Gatineau
