= Gatineau tramway =

Proposed Canadian light rail system

Overview
- Native name: Tramway de Gatineau
- Owner: Ville de Gatineau
- Locale: National Capital Region
- Transit type: Tram
- Number of lines: 2
- Line number: Line A; Line B
- Number of stations: 37
- Website: tramwaygatineauottawa.ca/en

Operation
- Operation will start: 2035 (planned)
- Operator: STO
- Character: At-grade street running in Gatineau, Underground tunnel in Ottawa
- Rolling stock: Alstom Citadis Spirit

The Gatineau tramway (French: Tramway de Gatineau) is a planned 24 kilometres (15 mi) tram system proposed by the Ville de Gatineau to be located in the communities of Aylmer and Plateau in Gatineau, Quebec, as well as into the downtown of Ottawa, Ontario. The project, officially named TramGO, is being overseen by Mobility Infra Québec (MIQ), the system will be operated by Société de transport de l'Outaouais (STO), Gatineau's public transportation service. The system is planned to begin operation in 2032. In 2018, the project was estimated to cost CA$2.1 billion (though this estimate does not include the Ottawa portion). Between 2023 and 2024, the cost of the project was revised to upwards of $3.5 billion. In 2026, the project was estimated to cost $8 billion. The Ville de Gatineau is looking to the Government of Quebec to fund 60 percent of the project and for the Canadian federal government to fund 40 percent of the project.

== Project updates ==
=== 2023 ===
In February 2023, the NDP backed the project and called upon Prime Minister Justin Trudeau and the Liberal Party of Canada to pledge the necessary funding. In March 2023, an agreement to fund various transit projects in Quebec, including the tramway, was announced by Mayor France Bélisle. Between January and June 2023, four project staff members, including the director of the project, resigned from their positions, as the federal government had yet to officially announce funding of the project. On June 16, 2023, it was revealed by TVA Gatineau-Ottawa that there was friction between the mayors office and the board of directors of the STO, who accused Mayor France Bélisle of interference in the project. In July 2023, the city confirmed its support for the project.

=== 2024 ===
In late March 2021 TVA Gatineau-Ottawa reported that the federal government had confirmed it would fund the pre-construction portion of the project. However, there was no direct mention of funding for the project in the 2024 federal budget, which the STO described as "concerning". La coalition S’allier Pour le Tramway called it a "slap in the face for the region", and the interim mayor of Gatineau, Daniel Champagne, said he was "extremely disappointed". On June 27, 2024, the Government of Quebec and the Government of Canada announced CA$163.5 million in funding for the planning of the tramway between Gatineau's west end and downtown Ottawa. On December 12, 2024, the STO announced that Groupe Porteur (Systra, Egis, and EXP) had been awarded a $114-million contract to complete the technical and environmental studies for the route in Quebec. On December 16, 2024, the federal government announced a commitment of $31.6 million for feasibility studies on the two-kilometer portion of the project on the Ontario side of the border.

=== 2025 ===
In January 2025 the project was submitted to the Ministry of the Environment and the Fight against Climate Change, Wildlife and Parks (MELCCFP). In February and March public consultation was organized by the MELCCFP. On March 20, 2025, following the 30-day online consultation, MELCCFP published a report summarizing the issues raised by the public. A geotechnical study and a soil environmental characterization study began in late summer 2025, and is expected to conclude in Winter 2026. In September the NCC released their Confederation Boulevard Planning and Design Guidelines which included design concepts for the tramway running along Wellington Street.

=== 2026 ===
On February 17, 2026 it was announced that the $163 million in provincial funds allocated to the tramway were being transferred from the city of Gatineau and the STO to the Mobility Infra Québec (MIQ). The mayor of Gatineau, Maude Marquis-Bissonnette, and the president of the Société de transport de l'Outaouais (STO), Edmond Leclerc, strongly opposed this funding reallocation fearing it would cause significant project delays. On June 18, 2026, the MIQ announced that the estimated cost of the original 24 kilometres (15 mi) project was around $8 billion. MIQ CEO, Renée Amilcar, stated the project would likely be built over multiple phases, with the Plateau neighbourhood being the top priority. A final report is expected in November 2026.

== Ottawa proposal ==
The eastern terminus of the system would be in Ottawa near Lyon station, allowing riders to connect with O-Train Line 1, with alternative plans having it terminate further east in Ottawa. The system would cross the river over the Portage Bridge. Although early plans called for the tramway to travel across the Prince of Wales Bridge and the Alexandra Bridge, the Portage Bridge was later identified as the best crossing for the tramway by a study conducted for STO by engineering firm WSP Global. An analysis showed that connecting the system to Ottawa across the Prince of Wales Bridge would have overwhelmed Bayview Station, its originally planned terminus. The Ottawa section is planned to run along Wellington Street or through a tunnel beneath Sparks Street. According to a survey of Ottawa and Gatineau residents conducted by STO, 60% of respondents preferred the tunnel option. On November 16, 2020, Ottawa's transportation committee granted approval for the Spark Street tunnel to be built for the tramway, while still leaving the Wellington option open as a possibility. On August 13, 2021, the National Capital Commission endorsed the idea of the tramway running down Wellington Street.

=== Loop proposal ===
A group known as "Supporters of the Loop" have proposed the creation of a rail transit loop between the downtowns of Ottawa and Gatineau which the tramway would connect into. The loop would run along Wellington Street in Ottawa, turn north on an undetermined street (possibly Mackenzie Avenue, Sussex Drive or Dalhousie Street), cross the Ottawa River on the Alexandra Bridge, run along Rue Laurier in Gatineau, before connecting back to Ottawa via the Portage Bridge. The group's supporters include former Ottawa mayors Jim Durrell, Jacquelin Holzman, and Larry O’Brien. Ottawa mayor Jim Watson said that while it was an interesting idea, his own priority was to build Stage 3 of the O-Train. On November 16, 2020, Ottawa's transportation committee passed a motion requesting the federal government provide funds for a feasibility study on the transit loop and on having Wellington Street converted into a pedestrian mall.
