= Marc Bureau =

Marc Bureau may refer to:

- Marc Bureau (ice hockey) (born 1966), former NHL player
- Marc Bureau (politician) (born 1955), Quebec municipal politician
