= 2001 Quebec municipal elections =

- November 4, 2005

Several municipalities in the Canadian province of Quebec held elections on November 4, 2001, to elect mayors, reeves, and city councillors. The most closely watched contest was in the newly amalgamated city of Montreal, where Gérald Tremblay defeated incumbent Pierre Bourque.

== Results ==
=== Gatineau ===
2001 Gatineau municipal election: Mayor
Party	Candidate	Popular vote			Expenditures
Party	Candidate	Votes	%	±%	Expenditures
Independent	Yves Ducharme	47,975	54.39	–	none listed
Independent	Robert Labine	40,227	45.61	-2.71 (Note: The difference is taken from the result of the 1999 Gatineau mayoral election, which was before amalgamation.)	none listed
Total valid votes		88,202	98.65		
Total rejected, unmarked and declined votes		1,203	1.35	-0.07	
Turnout		89,405	53.76	+7.11	
Eligible voters		166,292			
Note: Candidate campaign colours, unless a member of a party, are based on the prominent colour used in campaign items (signs, literature, etc.) or colours used in polling graphs and are used as a visual differentiation between candidates.
Sources: Office of the City Clerk of Gatineau

=== Longueuil ===
Mayor of Longueuil
Candidate	Party	Vote	%
Jacques Olivier	Parti municipal Rive-Sud - Équipe Jacques Olivier	75,707	62.0%
Marguerite Pearson Richard	Ralliement démocratique - Équipe Marguerite Pearson Richard	46,308	38.0%
Total valid votes		122,015	100%

=== Montreal ===
2001 Montreal municipal election: Mayor of Montreal
Party	Candidate	Votes	%
Montreal Island Citizens Union	Gérald Tremblay	311,451	50.37
Vision Montreal	(x)Pierre Bourque	279,123	45.14
White Elephant Party	Michel Bédard	9,785	1.58
Independent	Super Cauchon	8,382	1.36
Independent	Pierre Larouche	1,991	0.32
Independent	Patricia Métivier	1,809	0.29
Independent	Daniel Cormier	1,434	0.23
Independent	Ricardo Hrtschan	1,290	0.21
Independent	Al Cappe	943	0.15
Independent	Daniel Simon	909	0.15
Independent	Ian Fitchtenbaum	811	0.13
Independent	Samoila Pirau	366	0.06
Total valid votes		618,294	100
Source: Election results, 1833-2005 (in French), City of Montreal.

=== Mont-Saint-Michel ===
2001 Mont-Saint-Michel municipal election: Mayor
Candidate	Votes	%
(x)Roger Lapointe	acclaimed	.

Source: Élections municipales 2001 - Résultats des élections pour le poste de maire, Affaires municipales, Régions et Occupation du territoire Québec.

=== Potton ===
2001 Potton municipal election: Mayor of Potton
Candidate	Votes	%
Claude Laplume	625	69.60
(x)André Marcoux	273	30.40
Total valid votes	898	100.00

Source: "Election 2001 Sherbrooke & Townships," Sherbrooke Record, 6 November 2001, p. 5.
