= Yves Ducharme =

Former Mayor of Gatineau

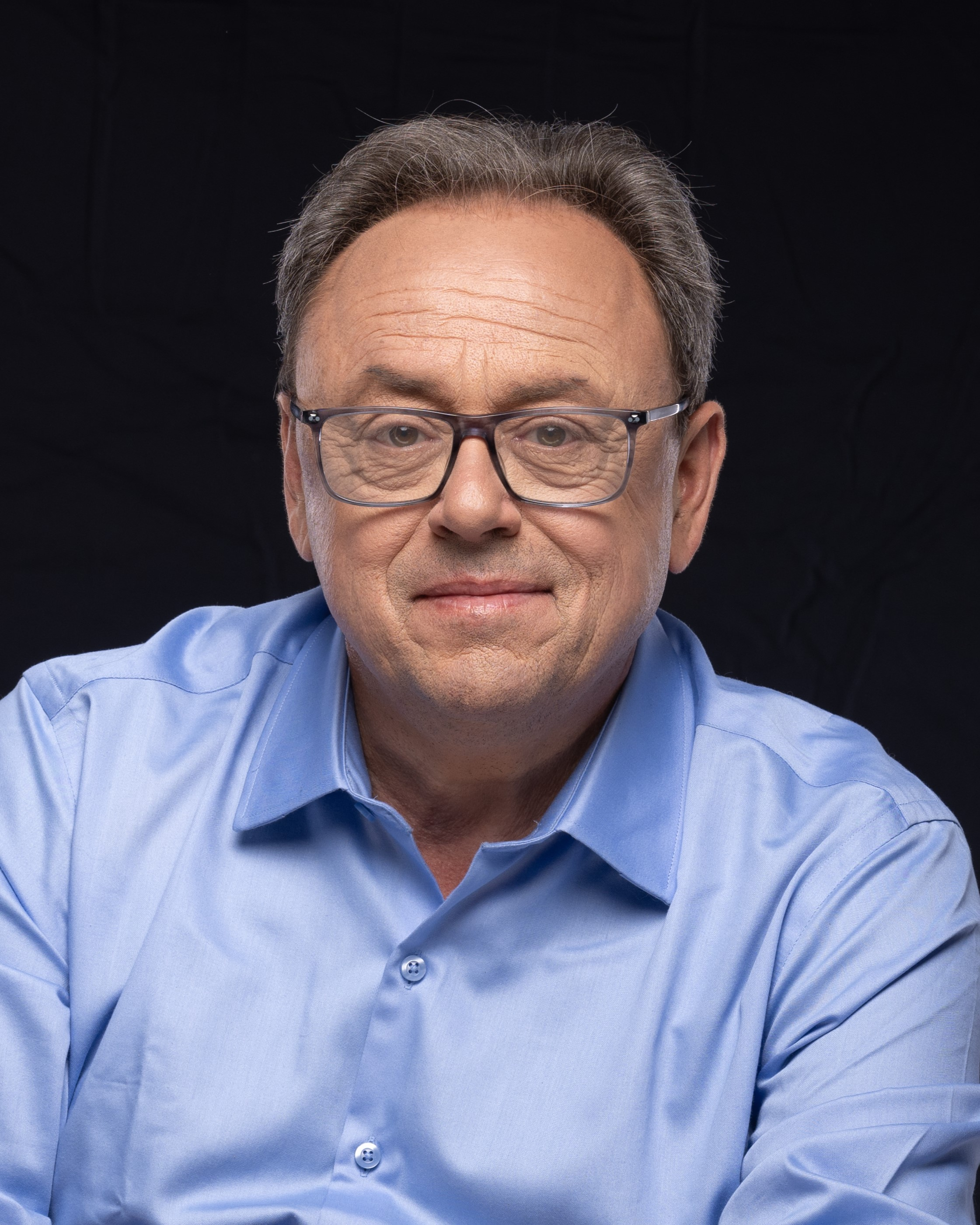
- Ducharme in 2024.

19th Mayor of Gatineau
- In office January 1, 2002 – November 5, 2005
- Preceded by: Robert Labine
- Succeeded by: Marc Bureau

49th Mayor of Hull
- In office December 6, 1992 – December 31, 2001
- Preceded by: Marcel Beaudry
- Succeeded by: Office abolished

66th President of the Federation of Canadian Municipalities
- In office January 1, 2003 – December 31, 2003
- Preceded by: John Schmal
- Succeeded by: Ann MacLean

Hull City Councillor
- In office 1986 – October 1992
- Preceded by: Pierre Cholette
- Succeeded by: Roch Cholette
- Constituency: Mont-Bleu District

Personal details
- Born: May 29, 1958 (age 68) Montreal, Quebec, Canada
- Party: Independent (municipal); Liberal (federal)
- Education: University of Ottawa (LL.L)
- Occupation: Politician; lawyer; consultant; businessman

Yves Ducharme (born May 29, 1958) is a Canadian politician who was the Mayor of Gatineau from 2002 to 2005 after the city had been merged with its neighbours, part of the supra-organization known as the Communauté urbaine de l'Outaouais, and was Mayor of Hull, in the Outaouais region, from 1992 to 2002. He was defeated in an election in 2005 by Marc Bureau and decided to quit municipal politics. He became president of the Federation of Canadian Municipalities.

== Political career ==
Ducharme entered municipal politics in 1986 when he was elected as the city councillor for the Mont-Bleu District of the then-City of Hull until being elected mayor in 1992. He served as mayor until 2001, when Hull was forced to merge with the surrounding cities of Gatineau, Aylmer, Buckingham and Masson-Angers. The bigger city was named Gatineau, and Ducharme became its first mayor in 2002 after beating Gatineau's former mayor Robert Labine in the election. In 2005, he lost re-election to first-time candidate, city councillor Marc Bureau, who won 68% of the vote in an election in which the participation rate was 47,3%.

== Electoral record ==
2024 Gatineau mayoral by-election Resignation of France Bélisle
Party	Candidate	Popular vote			Expenditures
Party	Candidate	Votes	%	±%	Expenditures
Action Gatineau	Maude Marquis-Bissonnette	27,833	41.70	+4.02	$85,881.58
Independent	Yves Ducharme	20,600	30.87	–	$77,670.15
Independent	Olive Kamanyana	7,253	10.87	–	$71,819.69
Independent	Daniel Feeny	6,539	9.80	–	$26,187.70
Independent	Stéphane Bisson	3,580	5.36	–	$27,090.54
Independent	Rémi Bergeron	499	0.75	-0.26	$0.00
Independent	Mathieu Saint-Jean	435	0.65	–	$463.31
Total valid votes		66,739	99.44		
Total rejected, unmarked and declined votes		379	0.56	-0.19	
Turnout		67,118	33.06	-2.05	
Eligible voters		203,032			
Note: Candidate campaign colours, unless a member of a party, are based on the prominent colour used in campaign items (signs, literature, etc.) or colours used in polling graphs and are used as a visual differentiation between candidates.
Sources: Office of the City Clerk of Gatineau

2001 Gatineau municipal election: Mayor
Party	Candidate	Popular vote			Expenditures
Party	Candidate	Votes	%	±%	Expenditures
Independent	Yves Ducharme	47,975	54.39	–	none listed
Independent	Robert Labine	40,227	45.61	-2.71 (Note: The difference is taken from the result of the 1999 Gatineau mayoral election, which was before amalgamation.)	none listed
Total valid votes		88,202	98.65		
Total rejected, unmarked and declined votes		1,203	1.35	-0.07	
Turnout		89,405	53.76	+7.11	
Eligible voters		166,292			
Note: Candidate campaign colours, unless a member of a party, are based on the prominent colour used in campaign items (signs, literature, etc.) or colours used in polling graphs and are used as a visual differentiation between candidates.
Sources: Office of the City Clerk of Gatineau

1999 Hull mayoral election
Candidate	Votes	%
Yves Ducharme (X)	13,272	82.12
Denis Gagnon	1,372	8.49
Nicolas Martineau	778	4.81
Gheorge Irmia	740	4.58

== Honours ==

Ribbon	Description	Notes
	Order of the Aztec Eagle (Venera)	August 10, 2006: Ducharme was awarded the honour in recognition of his efforts to strengthen Canada–Mexico relations and his assistance in the founding UNAM Gatineau.

== See also ==
- Gatineau City Council
