= Daniel Champagne =

Acting Mayor of Gatineau

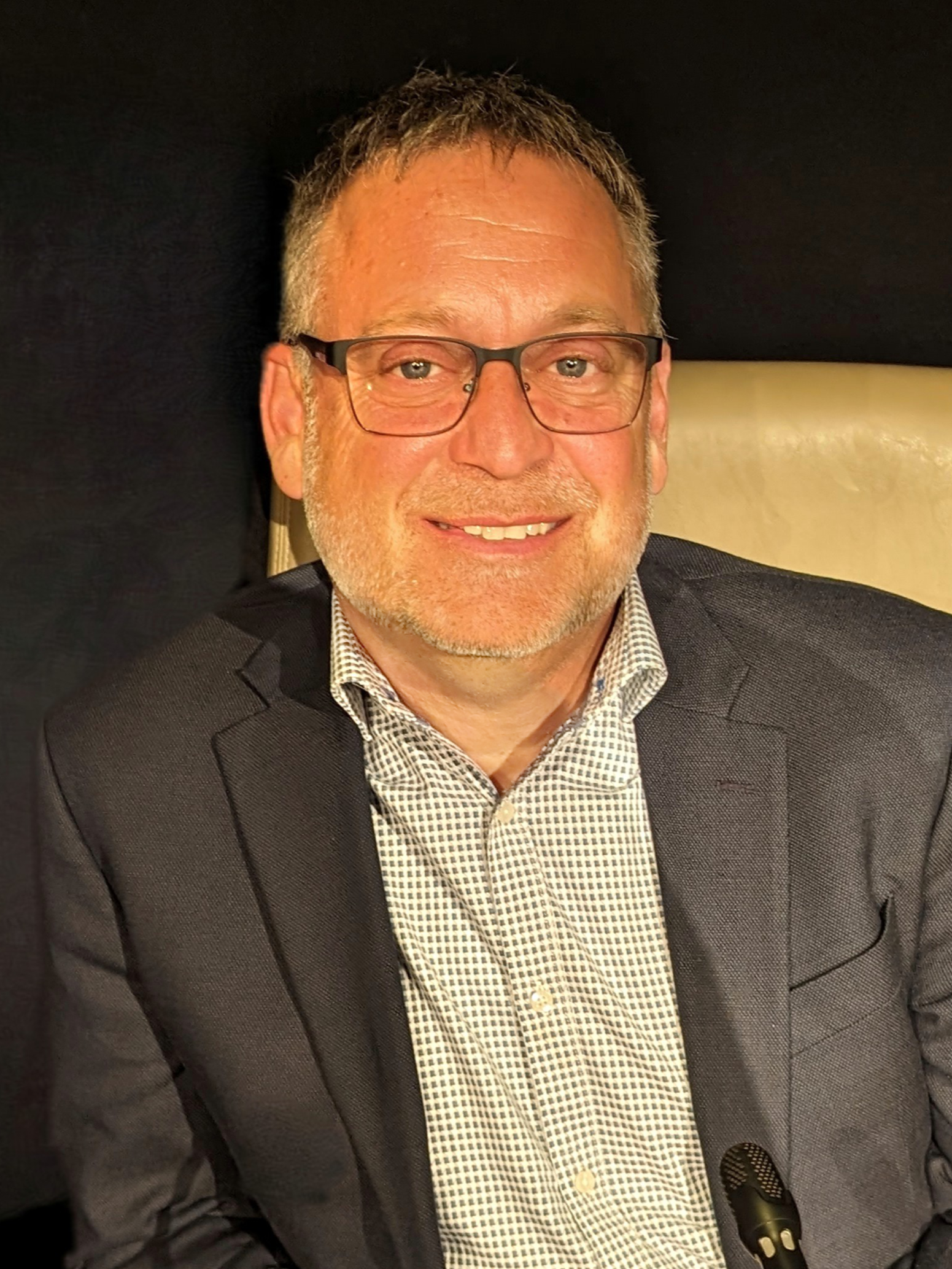
- Champagne in 2024

Mayor of Gatineau
- Acting
- In office February 22, 2024 – June 18, 2024
- Preceded by: France Bélisle
- Succeeded by: Maude Marquis-Bissonnette

Gatineau City Councillor
- Incumbent
- Assumed office November 3, 2013
- Preceded by: Joseph De Sylva
- Constituency: Versant District

Personal details
- Born: May 15, 1969 (age 57) Gatineau, Quebec, Canada
- Party: Independent
- Education: Université du Québec en Outaouais

Daniel Champagne (born May 15, 1969) is a Canadian politician who was the acting Mayor of Gatineau from February to June 2024 and has served as the city councillor for Versant District since 2013. He was the Deputy Mayor of Gatineau until February 22, 2024, when incumbent Mayor France Bélisle announced her sudden resignation from the mayoralty, thrusting Champagne into the acting position, becoming the first acting mayor in history of Gatineau. He served until Maude Marquis-Bissonnette was sworn in as mayor on June 18, 2024, after her win in the 2024 Gatineau mayoral by-election.

On January 18, 2024, he announced that he would not seek re-election for a fourth term as city councillor for Versant District.

== Electoral record ==
=== 2021 ===
Party	Candidate	Vote	%
Independent	Daniel Champagne (X)	2,842	72.30
Action Gatineau	Luc Bégin	1,089	27.70

=== 2017 ===
Party	Candidate	Vote	%
Independent	Daniel Champagne (X)	3,148	71.14
Action Gatineau	Luc Gelinas	1,277	28.86

=== 2013 ===
Party	Candidate	Vote	%
Independent	Daniel Champagne	2,607	57.35
Action Gatineau	Geneviève Ouimet	1,939	42.65
