= Mayor of Gatineau =

Political office

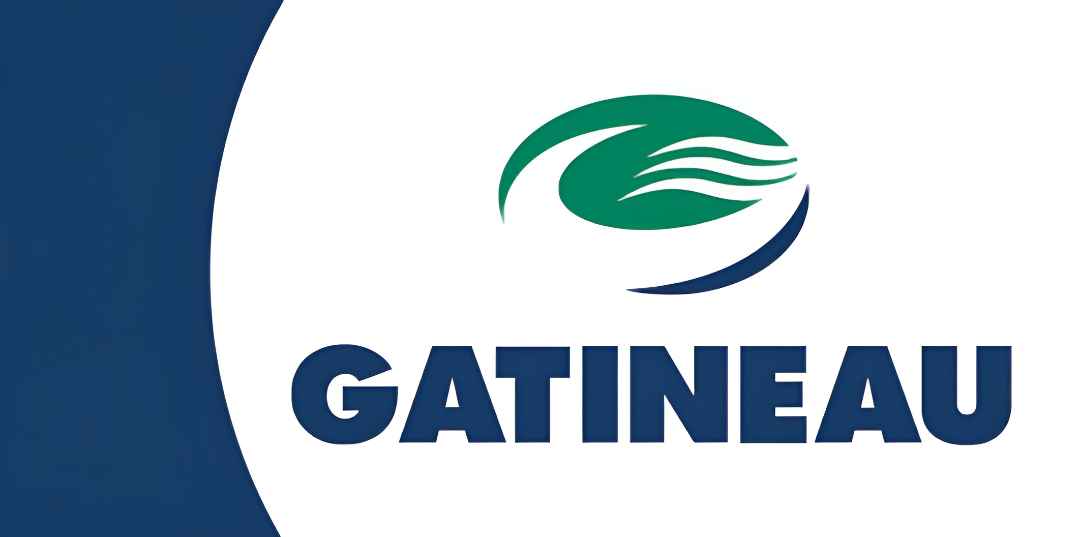
- Flag of Gatineau

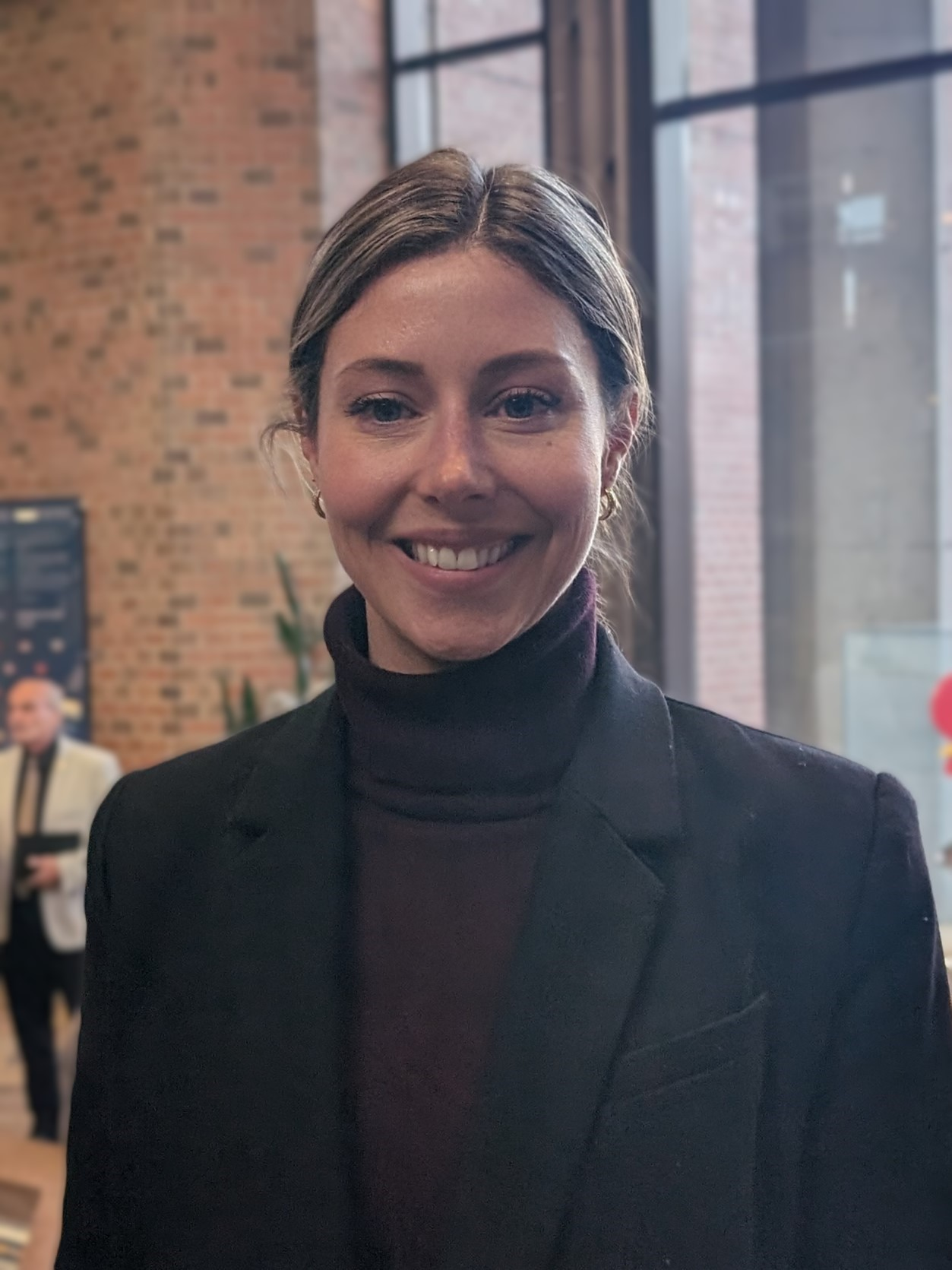
- Incumbent; Maude Marquis-Bissonnette since June 18, 2024
- Ville de Gatineau; Office of the Mayor
- Style: His/Her Worship; Mayor (informal)
- Member of: Gatineau City Council
- Seat: Maison du Citoyen
- Appointer: Direct election
- Term length: Four years; renewable
- Constituting instrument: Charter of the Ville de Gatineau
- Inaugural holder: Théodore Baribeau (historic); Yves Ducharme (post-current amalgamation)
- Formation: November 18, 1933 (historical); January 1, 2002 (current)
- Salary: CA$154,330
- Website: gatineau.ca/maire

The mayor of Gatineau (French: maire de Gatineau) (Note: When the position is held by a woman, the French title is mairesse de Gatineau.) is head of the executive branch of the Gatineau City Council. The mayor is elected alongside the city council every four years on the first Sunday of November; there are no term limits. While in office, mayors are styled His/Her Worship (French: Son Honneur). The office of the mayor administers all city services, public property, police and fire protection, most public agencies, and enforces all city and provincial laws within Gatineau, Quebec.

Maude Marquis-Bissonnette has been the mayor of Gatineau since June 18, 2024, following her election in the 2024 by-election.

== History of the office ==
The first iteration of the position of Mayor of Gatineau was created in 1933, when the original Village de Gatineau was officially proclaimed; the town was commonly referred prior to its official proclamation as a municipality as Gatineau Mills after the paper mill that was in the area. The first Mayor was Théodore Baribeau, who entered the position on November 18, 1933; he was a merchant who had moved to the village not long before.

The position would remain in its original form until 1974, when the town was amalgamated with the nearby municipalities of Pointe-Gatineau, Touraine, Templeton, Templeton-Ouest, Templeton-Est, and Templeton-Est-Partie-Est to form a larger Ville de Gatineau. As part of the amalgamation, a provisional council was selected among previous members of the various municipal councils of the amalgamated municipalities; the outgoing Mayor of Touraine Donald Poirier was selected as the President of the Provisional Council and interim Mayor. Poirier ran in the ensuing election, but lost and was replaced by former Gatineau mayor John-R. Luck as the first Mayor of the newly-formed municipality.

The most recent changes to the position occurred during the 2000–2006 municipal reorganization in Quebec, when the Parti Québécois government of Lucien Bouchard passed Bill 170, An Act to reform the municipal territorial organization of the metropolitan regions of Montréal, Québec and the Outaouais, which amalgamated Gatineau with the surrounding municipalities of Hull, Aylmer, Buckingham and Masson-Angers into the new Ville de Hull-Gatineau. The name would later be changed to simply Ville de Gatineau on June 27, 2001. Unlike the previous time, however, the amalgamation would not take place until after the 2001 municipal election cycle, allowing for residents to vote for a new city council; the election was won by outgoing Hull Mayor Yves Ducharme.

The first mayor to be affiliated with a local political party is Maxime Pedneaud-Jobin, who, along with other members of city council, founded Action Gatineau ahead of the 2013 municipal election, in which he would eventually win the mayoralty race.

== Role and authority ==
The position of Mayor of Gatineau is outlined in the Charter of the Ville de Gatineau, which is the constitution of the municipality. The version that the modern Ville de Gatineau follows was passed in 2001 before the 2002 amalgamation. In accordance with the Charter, the mayor is a member of and the chair of the council's Executive Committee by default. However, they may appoint another councillor to fill the position of chair at their own leisure. They also sit on the Joint Land Use Planning Commission for the Outaouais.

The duties and powers of the mayoralty, on the other hand, are outlined in the Cities and Towns Act. The mayor's authority covers all aspects of city administration, serving as the highest authority in all matters. Items can be added by the mayor directly to the city council's agenda without going through a committee. The mayor may preside over council meetings in the event of the absence of the speaker, and also holds ex officio membership on all council committees and, concurrently, has voting rights on every committee. They also sit on the National Capital Commission's Board of Directors as a non-voting ex officio member alongside the Mayor of Ottawa, with whom they frequently collaborate with. The mayor has the power to call for a special meeting of the council whenever they see fit, regardless of the approval of other members of the council. In the event of a vacancy, the acting mayor holds most of the powers and privileges that a regularly elected mayor would, with certain exceptions, such as not being allowed to send by-laws back to the city council should they disagree with their contents and sitting on the NCC Board of Directors.

== Post-amalgamation mayors of Gatineau ==
Over the course of Gatineau's history, the municipality's borders have expanded through annexations. This most recently occurred in 2002 when the municipalities of Hull, Aylmer, Buckingham and Masson-Angers were amalgamated with Gatineau. The following is a list of mayors of the current post-amalgamation Gatineau.

No.	Photo	Mayor	Party	Terms of office	Took office	Left office
19		Yves Ducharme	Independent	1	January 1, 2002	November 5, 2005
20		Marc Bureau	Independent	2	November 5, 2005	November 3, 2013
21		Maxime Pedneaud-Jobin	Action Gatineau	2	November 3, 2013	November 7, 2021
22		France Bélisle	Independent	1 (Note: Resigned before the end of her term.)	November 7, 2021	February 22, 2024
—		Daniel Champagne (acting)	Independent	— (Note: Champagne served as acting mayor following the resignation of Bélisle.)	February 22, 2024	June 18, 2024
23		Maude Marquis-Bissonnette	Action Gatineau	1	June 18, 2024	Incumbent

== See also ==
- Gatineau City Council
- History of Quebec
