= Maude Marquis-Bissonnette =

23rd Mayor of Gatineau

Her Worship Maude Marquis-Bissonnette
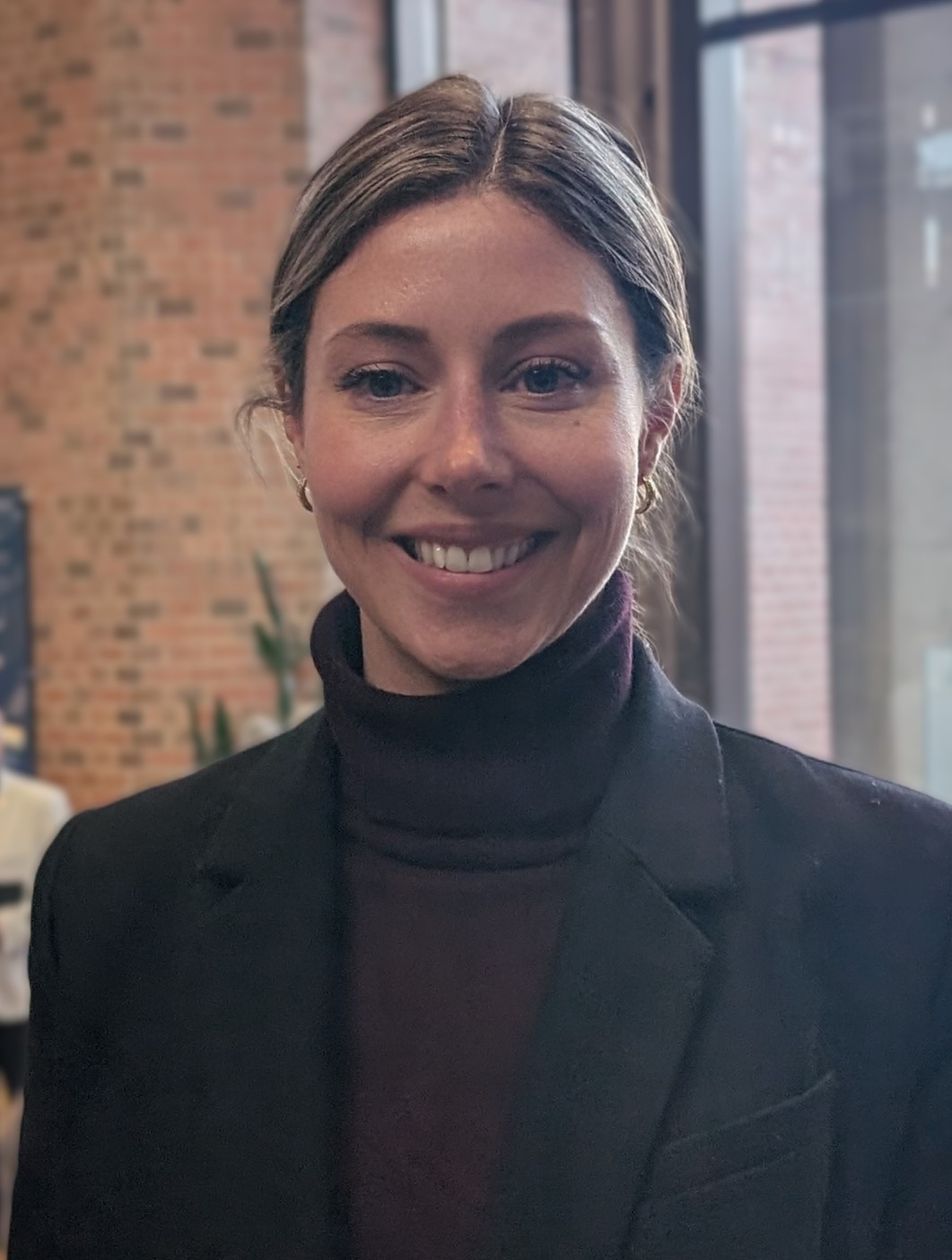
- Marquis-Bissonnette in 2024

23rd Mayor of Gatineau
- Incumbent
- Assumed office June 18, 2024
- Preceded by: Daniel Champagne (acting)

Leader of Action Gatineau
- Incumbent
- Assumed office April 10, 2024
- Preceded by: Steve Moran (interim)
- In office April 25, 2021 – December 22, 2021
- Preceded by: Maxime Pedneaud-Jobin
- Succeeded by: Steve Moran (interim)

Gatineau City Councillor
- In office November 14, 2017 – November 7, 2021
- Preceded by: Maxime Tremblay
- Succeeded by: Bettyna Belizaire
- Constituency: Plateau District

Personal details
- Born: 1987 or 1988 (age 37–38)
- Party: Action Gatineau
- Spouse: Alex Van Dieren
- Education: Université de Montréal (BSc); École nationale d'administration publique (MPA); Carleton University (PhD)
- Occupation: University professor

Maude Marquis-Bissonnette is a Canadian university professor and politician who is the Mayor of Gatineau, having taken office on June 18, 2024, after being elected in the 2024 Gatineau mayoral by-election. She is the first mayor of modern Gatineau to be elected in a by-election and the first since Guy Lacroix's by-election victory in 1994 following the resignation of Robert Labine. She was elected to a full term in 2025.

Before her election as mayor, she served as vice-president of the student association of the Université de Montréal as an undergraduate, and later as a member of the Gatineau City Council.

== Electoral record ==
2024 Gatineau mayoral by-election Resignation of France Bélisle
| Party | Candidate | Popular vote | | | Expenditures |
| Party | Candidate | Votes | % | ±% | Expenditures |
|---|---|---|---|---|---|
| Action Gatineau | Maude Marquis-Bissonnette | 27,833 | 41.70 | +4.02 | $85,881.58 |
| Independent | Yves Ducharme | 20,600 | 30.87 | – | $77,670.15 |
| Independent | Olive Kamanyana | 7,253 | 10.87 | – | $71,819.69 |
| Independent | Daniel Feeny | 6,539 | 9.80 | – | $26,187.70 |
| Independent | Stéphane Bisson | 3,580 | 5.36 | – | $27,090.54 |
| Independent | Rémi Bergeron | 499 | 0.75 | -0.26 | $0.00 |
| Independent | Mathieu Saint-Jean | 435 | 0.65 | – | $463.31 |
| Total valid votes | | 66,739 | 99.44 | | |
| Total rejected, unmarked and declined votes | | 379 | 0.56 | -0.19 | |
| Turnout | | 67,118 | 33.06 | -2.05 | |
| Eligible voters | | 203,032 | | | |
Note: Candidate campaign colours, unless a member of a party, are based on the prominent colour used in campaign items (signs, literature, etc.) or colours used in polling graphs and are used as a visual differentiation between candidates.
Sources: Office of the City Clerk of Gatineau

2021 Gatineau municipal election: Mayor
| Party | Candidate | Popular vote | | | Expenditures |
| Party | Candidate | Votes | % | ±% | Expenditures |
|---|---|---|---|---|---|
| Independent | France Bélisle | 29,768 | 42.86 | – | $81,079.89 |
| Action Gatineau | Maude Marquis-Bissonnette | 26,151 | 37.65 | -7.46 | none listed |
| Independent | Jean-François Leblanc | 11,326 | 16.31 | – | $71,309.44 |
| Independent | Jacques Lemay | 1,077 | 1.55 | – | $8,206.19 |
| Independent | Rémi Bergeron | 727 | 1.05 | – | $0.00 |
| Independent | Abdelhak Lekbabi | 411 | 0.59 | – | none listed |
| Total valid votes | | 69,460 | 99.25 | | |
| Total rejected, unmarked and declined votes | | 524 | 0.75 | -0.98 | |
| Turnout | | 69,984 | 35.11 | -3.41 | |
| Eligible voters | | 199,302 | | | |
Note: Candidate campaign colours, unless a member of a party, are based on the prominent colour used in campaign items (signs, literature, etc.) or colours used in polling graphs and are used as a visual differentiation between candidates.
Sources: Office of the City Clerk of Gatineau and Élections Québec

2017 Gatineau municipal election: Plateau
| Party | Candidate | Popular vote | | | Expenditures |
| Party | Candidate | Votes | % | ±% | Expenditures |
|---|---|---|---|---|---|
| Action Gatineau | Maude Marquis-Bissonnette | Acclaimed | – | – | none listed |
| Independent | ~~Patrick Doyon~~ | Withdrew | – | – | none listed |
| Total valid votes | | – | – | | |
| Total rejected, unmarked and declined votes | | – | – | – | |
| Turnout | | – | – | – | |
| Eligible voters | | – | | | |
Note: Candidate campaign colours, unless a member of a party, may be based on the prominent colour used in campaign items (signs, literature, etc.) or colours used in polling graphs and are used as a visual differentiation between candidates.
Sources: Office of the City Clerk of Gatineau
