= Marc Bureau (politician) =

Canadian politician

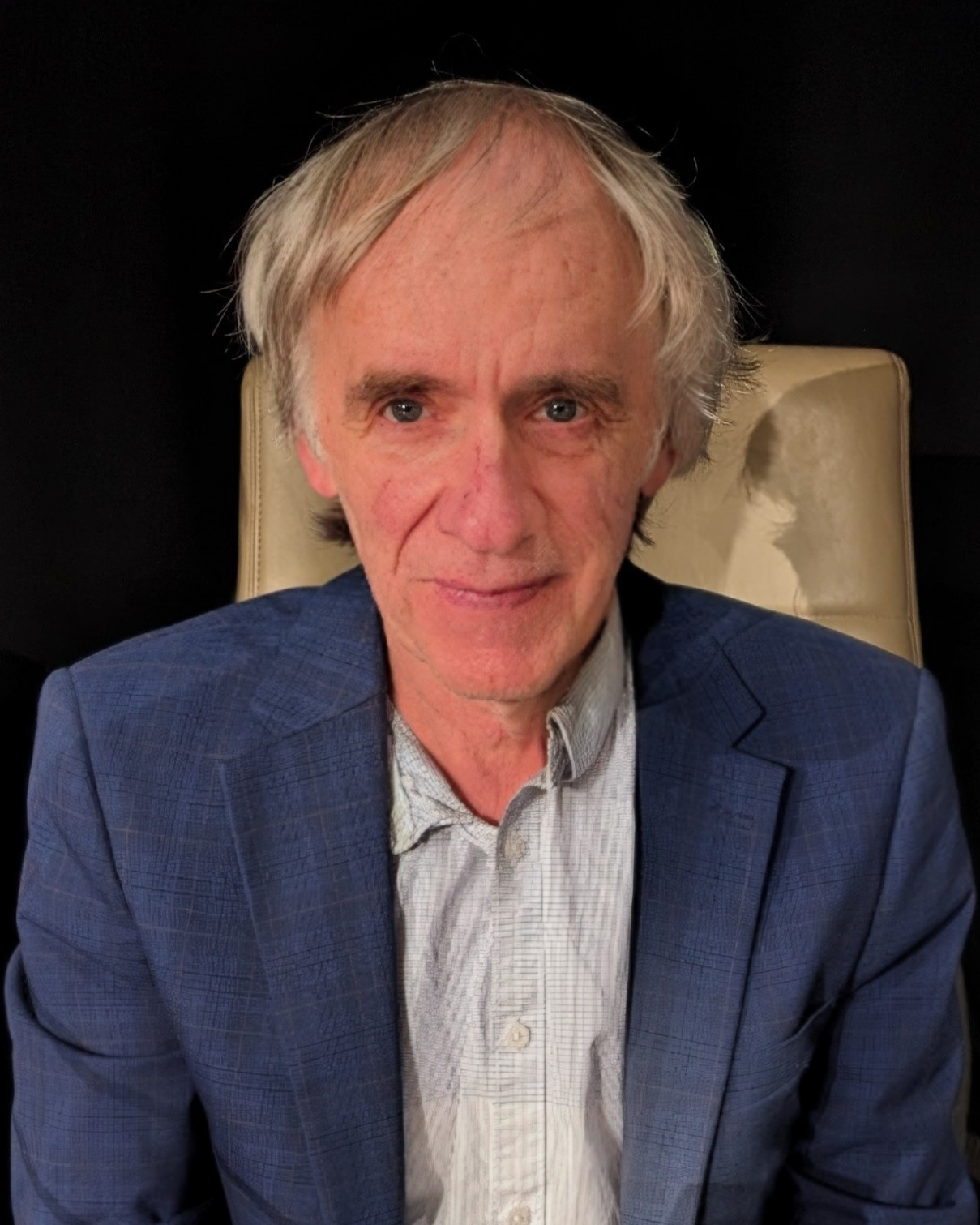
- Bureau in 2024

20th Mayor of Gatineau
- In office November 5, 2005 – November 3, 2013
- Preceded by: Yves Ducharme
- Succeeded by: Maxime Pedneaud-Jobin

Gatineau City Councillor
- In office October 23, 2022 – November 2, 2025
- Preceded by: Louise Boudrias
- Succeeded by: Isabelle Cousineau
- Constituency: Parc-de-la-Montagne-Saint-Raymond District
- In office November 4, 2001 – November 5, 2005
- Preceded by: District created
- Succeeded by: Patrice Martin
- Constituency: Wright–Parc-de-la-Montagne District

Personal details
- Born: August 11, 1955 (age 70) Rouyn-Noranda, Quebec, Canada
- Party: Independent

Marc Bureau (born August 11, 1955) is a Canadian politician, who was the mayor of the city of Gatineau, Quebec from 2005 to 2013.

Born in Rouyn-Noranda, Quebec, he was elected mayor of Gatineau on November 6, 2005, by beating incumbent Yves Ducharme with 68% of the vote. His landslide victory came as a surprise because he had trailed in the polls at the start of the campaign, although he progressed until being given winner by a small margin two weeks before the election (52% vs 48%). More than a week before the election, polls gave him a 14 points advantage (57% vs 43%). His victory is attributed by most people including both candidates to the citizen's desire for a change after 13 years of reign from Ducharme, and also Bureau's promises of a more transparent city council. See 2005 Quebec municipal elections.

He was defeated by Maxime Pedneaud-Jobin in the 2013 municipal election.

He lives in the Hull area of Gatineau and was the owner of a second-hand book, CD, and cassette store. He has a wife and four children.

== Political experience ==
Between 2001 and 2005, Bureau was a city councillor for Gatineau City Council. He was president of the environment commission and the housing commission between 2003 and 2005. At the environment commission, he dealt with the elaboration of the "Programme de gestion des matières résiduelles," a waste management plan ordered by the government of Quebec.

At the housing commission, he had to deal on numerous occasion with July 1 Moving Day problems and the elaboration of a social housing policy. Housing commission member François Roy, president of Logemen'Occupe, heavily criticized Bureau's work, arguing that he wasn't able to deliver the policy on time. Bureau answered that the consultant hired to draft the policy was hospitalized and could not complete the policy.

Bureau was elected back to City Council in a by-election in 2022 in the district of Parc-de-la-Montagne-Saint-Raymond.

== Transparency ==
Bureau's first political decision as mayor of Gatineau was to redirect the annual budget retreat. Instead of following Ducharme's retreat outside of Gatineau, Bureau ordered that the elaboration of the municipal budget be held in Gatineau with full public access. Aurèle Desjardins, city councillor of ward 14, publicly mentioned that such openness would be inefficient because the council would be often disturbed.

The elaboration of the city budget showed some level of transparency. On the first day, the news media had full access to the rooms in which the elected officials were briefed on the budget.

Later, council adopted a policy in which all meetings are broadcast live on the city's website.

== Sports complex and Rapibus transit project ==
Among Bureau's main projects for the city's future was the realization of a new sports complex in the Gatineau sector, which residents had demanded for several years. During the 2005 campaign, Bureau promised that he would do anything in his power for the completion of a new sports complex. Immediately after the election, he went into discussion with Chapleau MNA Benoit Pelletier in order to get funding for the province to build the complex. The province had approved money for the project and the city had some surplus money of its own. The project was completed, despite a significant rise of costs, but adds a new key location in the downtown part of the Gatineau sector, which includes a federal government office building and a college school. After delays, cost overruns and threatened legal action, the sports complex finally opened its doors on June 14, 2010 and came with a price tag of $50.4 million, becoming the largest sport and recreation complex completed in Quebec since the 1976 Montreal Olympics.

The City of Gatineau had submitted bids for hosting the Quebec Games in 2007 and in 2010, but the initial bid for 2007 was defeated by the city of Sept-Îles. However, Bureau, former mayor Robert Labine and a large group of volunteers attempted another bid which was made successful by defeating bids from Rivière-du-Loup, Charlevoix, Shawinigan and Vaudreuil-Dorion. The sports complex, according to Bureau is stated to be a key element for the games.

Bureau has also voiced his support for the Société de Transport de l'Outaouais's Rapibus project (similar to OC Transpo's Transitway in Ottawa) which is expected to be opened in 2013 after the provincial government officially secured a $146 million funding for the project, while the City of Gatineau provided the remainder $49 million. The Rapibus would also pass near the proposed sports complex in the Gatineau sector, as well as near the Casino du Lac-Leamy and the downtown Hull sector area. Bureau added that the city opted for bus rapid-transit ahead of light-rail service as the project was long-awaited. A transportation committee set up by Ottawa Mayor Larry O'Brien and led by former Liberal Minister David Collenette proposed light-rail extensions to Gatineau, Wakefield and Masson-Angers on existing railways right near most of the proposed Rapibus corridor.

== Council nominations ==
During his political campaign, Bureau stated his will to evenly distribute roles and responsibilities to council members. The selection process was based on "blind" competence evaluation. Without looking at the political allegation of the elected officials (pro-Bureau or pro-Ducharme), every candidate had an interview in the mayor's office to determine their professional backgrounds, qualifications and interests.

For the role of deputy mayor, rumours stated that Joseph De Sylva would be nominated. Finally, Aurèle Desjardins was nominated for one year. The selection process was applied and Mr Desjardins's background in finance and management, both academic and with his experience, proved useful.

Compared to the previous distribution, political analysts stated that the new mayor did a very good job by providing responsibilities to every elected council members. The only issue came from the four nominations for the executive committee. The Aylmer sector is absent from the executive committee appointees. Marc Bureau's justification was the lack of political experience from Aylmer's elected officials, despite the fact André Laframboise and Frank Thérien were councillors for several years for the former city of Aylmer under then-mayors Constance Provost and Marc Croteau. He pointed out that Aylmer wasn't at lost, since they were well represented in their key issues such as at the environment commission and the housing commission. However, according to the Aylmer Bulletin newspaper, it was criticized by Aylmer sector councillor Frank Thérien, and he added that if Aylmer had a seat in the executive committee, it would be more open.

As for the second most important committee, the city planning consultative committee (comité consultatif d'urbanisme - CCU), the mayor's office named Denise Laferrière as president instead of Simon Racine, who is now vice-president. Laferrière agreed often with Bureau on many issues during the 2001-2005 city council.

== 2006-07 budget ==
In December 2006, council voted unanimously in favour of the budget which kept current services as well as a slight tax increase at the rate of inflation mostly to cover costs for fire services. While the budget was voted without opposition, councillors Louise Poirier and Jocelyne Houle had criticized the budget citing a lack of vision for the city. Bureau later criticized the comments made the councillors qualifying it as "hypocrite". It then created a division within the council and Aylmer sector councillor André Laframboise, who denounced Bureau for his transparency, sought the idea of creating a new political party shortly after the budget.

== 2007-08 budget ==
In December 2007, the city approved a $403-million budget in which additional funding was announced for crumbling infrastructure, the STO and various projects such as the Rapibus, the sports complex and the central library. It resulted in a 2.4% tax increase as well as an increase of a levy-fee of about $50 for waste and recycling service.

== Electoral record (partial) ==
2009 Gatineau municipal election: Mayor
Candidate	Votes	%
(x)Marc Bureau	30,929	44.11
Aurèle Desjardins	18,551	26.46
Tony Cannavino	17,119	24.42
Luc Desjardins	1,266	1.81
Roger Fleury	1,198	1.71
Richard Gravel	1,052	1.50
Total valid votes	70,115	100
