= Maxime Pedneaud-Jobin =

Canadian politician (born 1968)

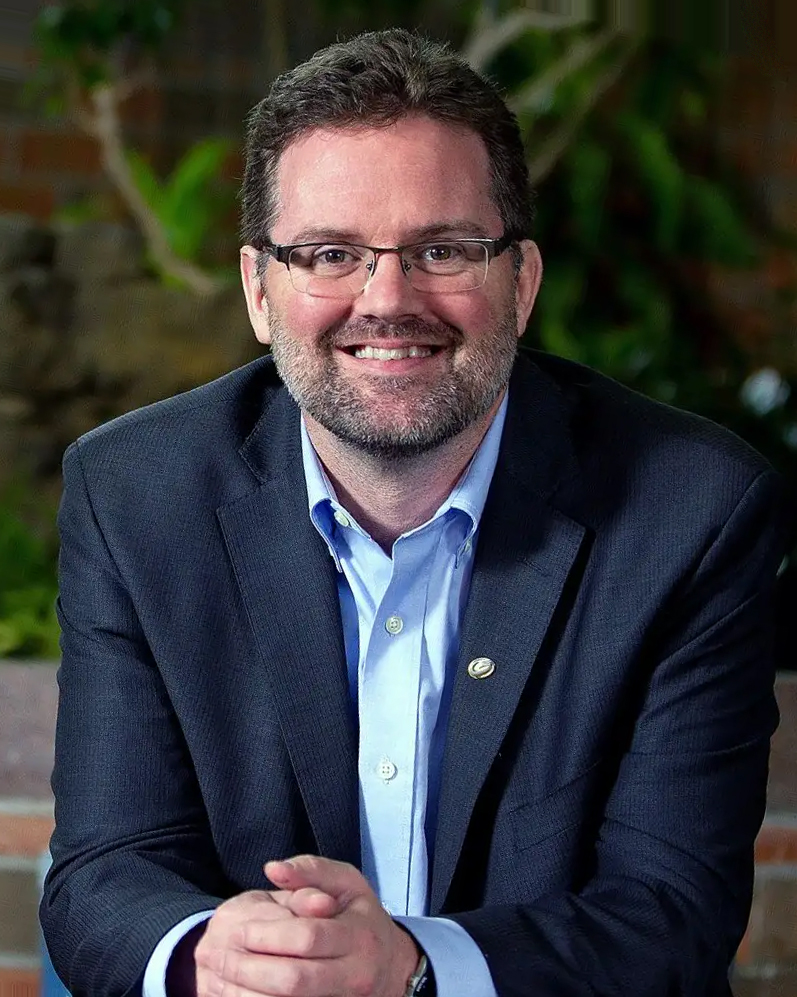

21st Mayor of Gatineau
- In office November 3, 2013 – November 7, 2021
- Preceded by: Marc Bureau
- Succeeded by: France Bélisle

Leader of Action Gatineau
- In office June 16, 2012 – April 25, 2021
- Preceded by: Position established
- Succeeded by: Maude Marquis-Bissonnette

Gatineau City Councillor
- In office November 1, 2009 – November 3, 2013
- Preceded by: Jocelyne Houle
- Succeeded by: Martin Lajeunesse
- Constituency: Buckingham District

Personal details
- Born: March 5, 1968 (age 58) Buckingham, Quebec, Canada
- Party: Action Gatineau
- Spouse: Pascale Landry
- Relatives: Bernard Landry (father-in-law)
- Education: University of Ottawa; Université du Québec en Outaouais

Maxime Pedneaud-Jobin (born 1968) is a Canadian politician, who was elected mayor of Gatineau in the city's 2013 municipal election under the Action Gatineau banner. Previously a city councillor for the city's Buckingham District, he defeated incumbent mayor Marc Bureau in what was widely seen as a surprise victory.

Educated in political science at the University of Ottawa, where he was president of the Student Federation of the University of Ottawa in 1990–91, and at the Université du Québec en Outaouais, Pedneaud-Jobin has worked primarily in health administration and as a columnist and commentator for various media in the Gatineau region. In early 2021, he announced that he would not seek a third term as mayor.
