= France Bélisle =

22nd mayor of Gatineau

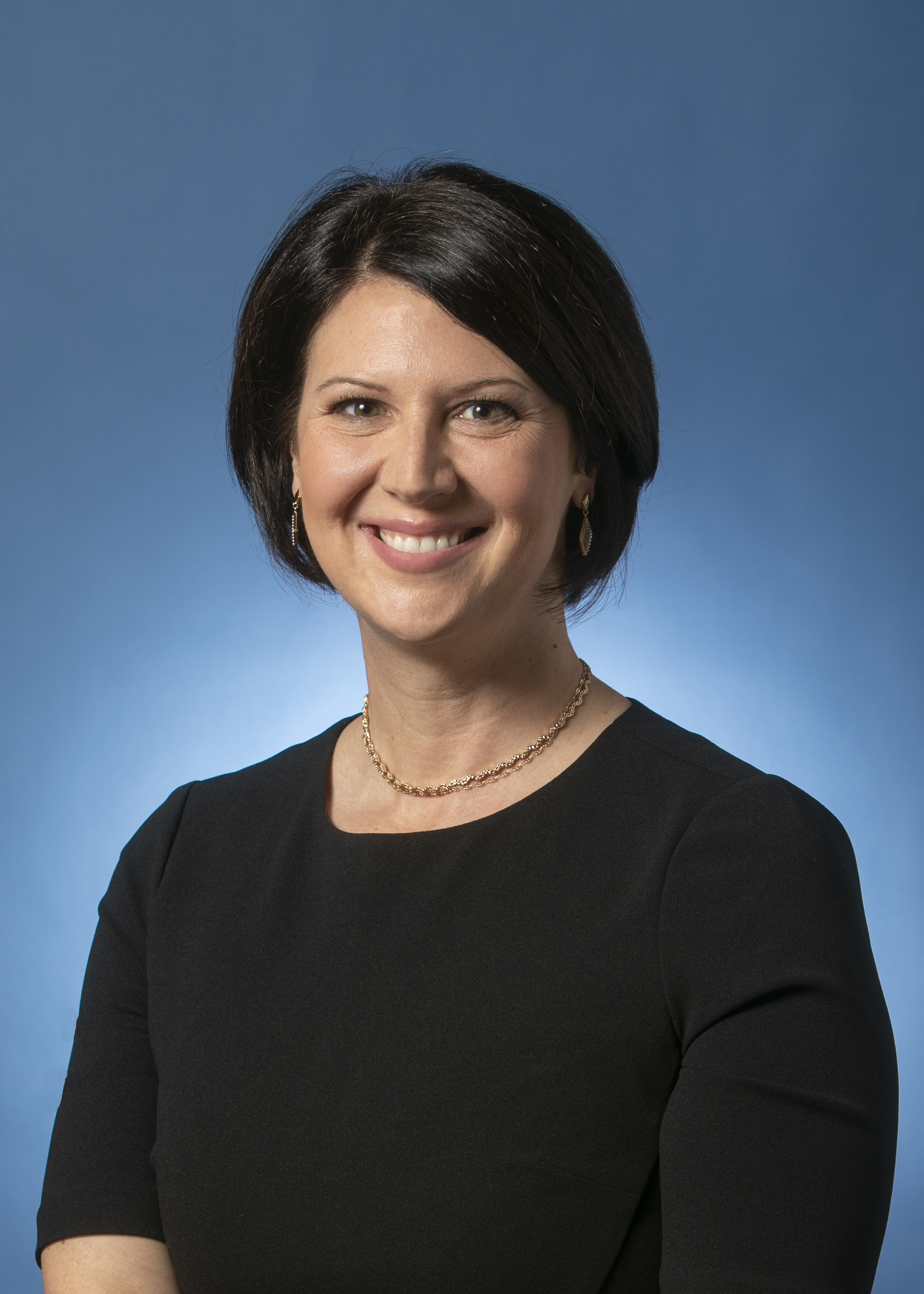

22nd Mayor of Gatineau
- In office November 16, 2021 – February 22, 2024
- Preceded by: Maxime Pedneaud-Jobin
- Succeeded by: Daniel Champagne (acting)

Personal details
- Party: Independent
- Occupation: Journalist

France Bélisle is a Canadian politician who served as the mayor of Gatineau, Quebec from 2021 to 2024. She was elected in the 2021 Gatineau municipal election, becoming the city's first female mayor.

Bélisle was educated in journalism at the University of Ottawa and Carleton University, Bélisle worked as a journalist and news director for Ici Radio-Canada Télé owned-and-operated station CBOFT-DT in Ottawa, Ontario until joining Tourisme Outaouais as its executive director in 2015. She left that role in 2021 to mount her campaign for mayor.

She campaigned on themes of transparency at Gatineau City Hall, as well as on the need for Gatineau to maintain and improve its collaboration and communication with Ottawa City Council. During the campaign she faced allegations that her leadership of Tourisme Outaouais had created a toxic work environment at the organization.

She was sworn in as mayor of the city on November 16, 2021. She resigned on February 22, 2024, citing a toxic political environment and death threats, triggering the 2024 Gatineau mayoral by-election.

== Electoral record ==
2021 Gatineau municipal election: Mayor
Party	Candidate	Popular vote			Expenditures
Party	Candidate	Votes	%	±%	Expenditures
Independent	France Bélisle	29,768	42.86	–	$81,079.89
Action Gatineau	Maude Marquis-Bissonnette	26,151	37.65	-7.46	none listed
Independent	Jean-François Leblanc	11,326	16.31	–	$71,309.44
Independent	Jacques Lemay	1,077	1.55	–	$8,206.19
Independent	Rémi Bergeron	727	1.05	–	$0.00
Independent	Abdelhak Lekbabi	411	0.59	–	none listed
Total valid votes		69,460	99.25		
Total rejected, unmarked and declined votes		524	0.75	-0.98	
Turnout		69,984	35.11	-3.41	
Eligible voters		199,302			
Note: Candidate campaign colours, unless a member of a party, are based on the prominent colour used in campaign items (signs, literature, etc.) or colours used in polling graphs and are used as a visual differentiation between candidates.
Sources: Office of the City Clerk of Gatineau and Élections Québec
