= École nationale d'administration publique =

Public administration school in Quebec City, Canada

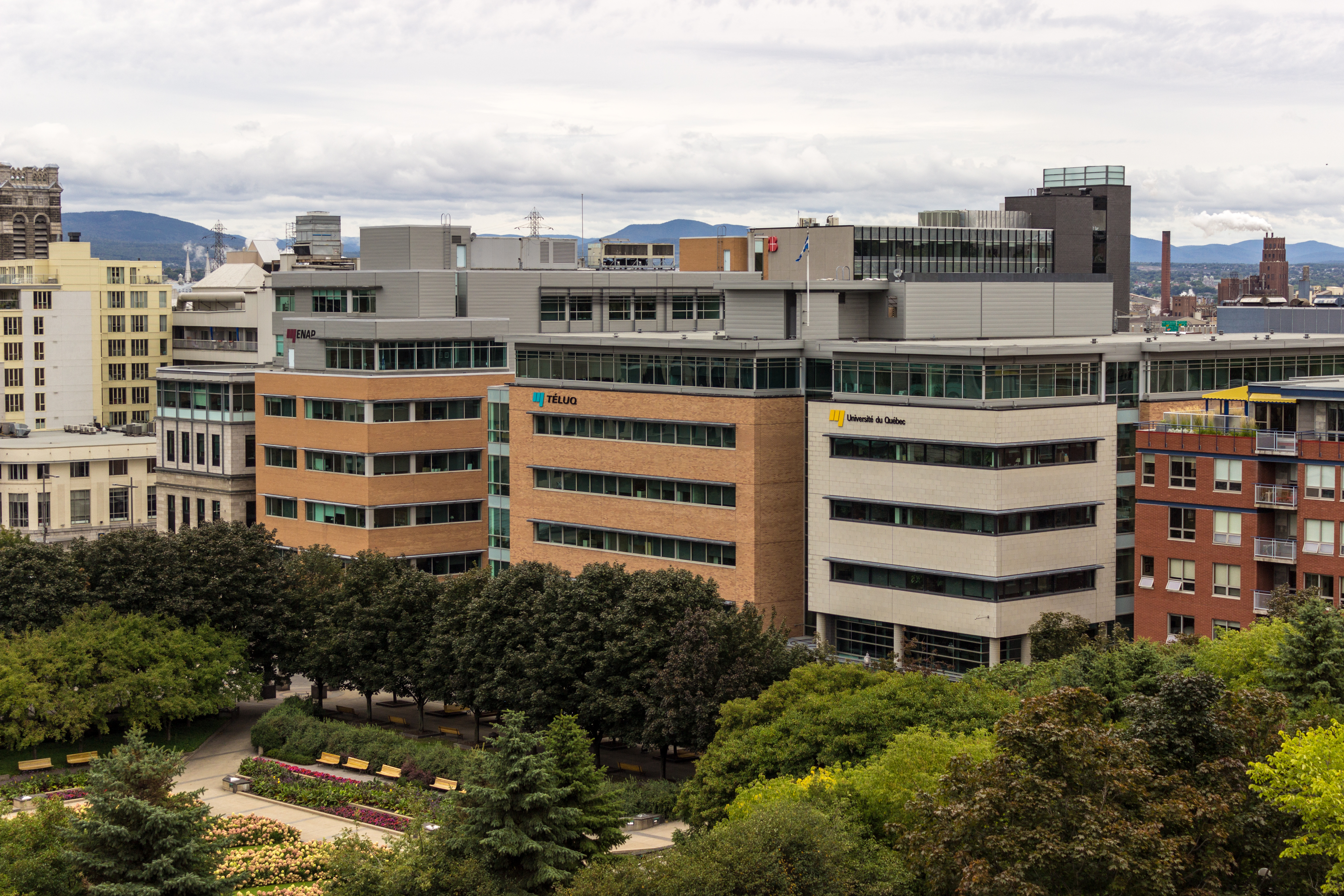
- Other name: ENAP
- Motto: "l'université de l'administration publique" (the public administration university)
- Type: Public
- Established: 1969
- Academic affiliations: UACC
- Faculty: 40
- Administrative staff: 143
- Location: 555, boulevard Charest Est; Quebec City, Quebec; G1K 9E5; 46°48′51″N 71°13′21″W
- Campus: Urban/Suburban, five campuses throughout Quebec, with two major campuses in Quebec City and Montreal and three campuses in Gatineau, Saguenay and Trois-Rivières
- Colours: Black & maroon
- Website: www.enap.ca

The École nationale d'administration publique (French pronunciation: [ekɔl nɑsjɔnal dadministʁɑsjɔ̃ pyblik]; "National School of Public Administration"; abbr. ENAP) is a graduate school in Quebec City, Quebec, Canada. It was established in 1969 by the Quebec provincial government as a means of encouraging people to study professional public administration during a period when a number of social and structural changes were taking place within the province. The enabling legislation is An Act respecting educational institutions at the university level.

The school is unique in that it is partly a pragmatic learning environment geared to educating Quebecers for positions within the public administration and partly a traditional university. ENAP has five campuses throughout Quebec, with two major campuses in Quebec City and Montreal, and three campuses in Gatineau, Saguenay, and Trois-Rivières.

== Mission ==
The mission of ENAP is to contribute to the development of public administration both theoretically and in practice. Training, services to organizations, research, and services are offered in partnership. ENAP seeks to set the standard for public administration in Quebec.

== Campus ==
- The Quebec City campus (head office) is 555, boulevard Charest Est Québec (Québec) G1K 9E5.
- The Montreal campus is 4750, avenue Henri-Julien, 5e étage Montréal (Québec) H2T 3E5.
- The Gatineau campus is 60, rue Laval, 6e étage, Gatineau, Québec, J8X 3G9.

== Programs ==
ENAP offers a variety of programs:

- Specialized Graduate Diplomas in Public administration, International administration and Regional administration.
- Master of Public Administration for Analysts in International administration, Organizational analysis and development, Program evaluation and Human resource management.
- Master of Urban Management Analysis for Analysts
- Master of Public Administration for Managers in Public management, International management and Municipal management
- PhD in Public policy analysis and management and Organizational theory and public management
- 12 short 15 credit courses

== See also ==
- Canada School of Public Service
- École nationale d'administration
