= Municipal elections in Quebec =

Elections in the Canadian province

This page has a list of all municipal elections in Quebec.

- 1970 Quebec municipal elections
- 1983 Quebec municipal elections
- 1985 Quebec municipal elections
- 1986 Quebec municipal elections
- 1987 Quebec municipal elections
- 1989 Quebec municipal elections
- 1990 Quebec municipal elections
- 1993 Quebec municipal elections
- 1994 Quebec municipal elections
- 1997 Quebec municipal elections
- 1998 Quebec municipal elections
- 1999 Quebec municipal elections
- 2001 Quebec municipal elections
- 2002 Quebec municipal elections
- 2003 Quebec municipal elections
- 2005 Quebec municipal elections
- 2006 Quebec municipal elections
- 2009 Quebec municipal elections
- 2013 Quebec municipal elections
- 2017 Quebec municipal elections
- 2021 Quebec municipal elections
- 2025 Quebec municipal elections

== See also ==
- Municipal elections in Canada
