= List of mayors of Gatineau =

This is a list of mayors of Gatineau, Quebec and of its various pre-amalgamated parts. Note that major amalgamations occurred in 1975 and again in 2002.

- Théodore Baribeau (1933-1937)
- Palma Racicot (1937-1939)
- J. Edouard Charette (1939)
- Palma Racicot (1939-1945)
- J. Léo Smith (1945-1956)
- Eloi Baribeau (1956-1957)
- Roland Théorêt (1957-1959)
- Aurèle Graveline (1959-1962)
- Roland Théorêt (1962-1965)
- Jacques Poulin (1965-1971)
- Ludovic Routhier (1971)
- John-R. Luck (1971-1975)
- Donald Poirier (provisional council, 1975)
- John-R. Luck (1975-1983)
- Gaétan Cousineau (1983-1988)
- Robert Labine (1988-1994)
- Guy Lacroix (1994-1999)
- Robert Labine (1999-2001)
- Yves Ducharme (2002-2005)
- Marc Bureau (2005-2013)
- Maxime Pedneaud-Jobin (2013–2021)
- France Bélisle, (2021–2024)
- Daniel Champagne, (2024; acting)
- Maude Marquis-Bissonnette (2024–present)

== Mayors of pre-amalgamated towns and cities ==
=== Hull (1875-2001) ===
- George Jacob Marston, Sr. (1875-1876)
- Henri Isaie Richer (1876-1877)
- Christopher C. Brigham (1877-1878)
- Charles Everett Graham (1878-1879)
- Charles Leduc (1879-1881)
- Ezra Butler Eddy (1881-1885)
- Charles Leduc (1885-1886)
- Alfred Rochon (1886-1887)
- Ezra Buttler Eddy (1887-1888)
- Alfred Rochon (1888-1889)
- Éraste d'Odet d'Orsonnens (1889-1890)
- William Francis Scott (1890-1891)
- Ezra Buttler Eddy (1891-1892)
- Louis Napoléon Champagne (1892-1893)
- Edmond Stanislas Aubry (1893-1894)
- Richard Alexis Helmer (1894)
- Edmond Stanislas Aubry (1894-1895)
- Charles Everett Graham (1895-1896)
- Louis Napoléon Champagne (1896-1897)
- William Francis Scott (1897-1898)
- Ferdinand Barette (1898-1900)
- Richard Alexis Helmer (1900-1901)
- Victor Ovide Falardeau (1901-1903)
- Ferdinand Gendron (1903-1904)
- Victor Ovide Falardeau (1904-1905)
- Edmond Stanislas Aubry (1905-1906)
- Augustin Thibault (1906-1909)
- Joseph Éloi Fontaine (1909-1911)
- Urgèle Archambault (1911-1912)
- Hormidas Dupuis (1912-1914)
- Joseph Bourque (1914-1916)
- Urgèle Archambault (1916-1920)
- Louis Cousineau (1920-1922)
- Hilaire Thérien (1922-1924)
- Louis Cousineau (1924-1926)
- Théodore Lambert (1926-1936)
- Alphonse Moussette (1936-1940)
- Raymond Brunet (1941-1948)
- Alphonse Moussette (1949-1951)
- Henri Gauthier (1952-1953)
- Alexis Caron (1953-1955)
- Thomas Moncion (1955-1959)
- Armand Turpin (1959-1964)
- Marcel D'Amour (1964-1972)
- Jean-Marie Séguin (1972-1974)
- Gilles Rocheleau (1974-1981)
- Michel Légère (1981-1991)
- Marcel Beaudry (1991-1992)
- Yves Ducharme (1992-2001)

=== Pointe-Gatineau (1876-1974) ===
- James O'Hagan (1876-1877)
- Pierre Charette (1877-1879)
- Joseph Moreau (1879-1880)
- Joseph Smeyers Stassardt (1880)
- Isaac Lépine (1880-1882)
- Francois-Xavier Bouvier (1882-1884)
- Pierre Charette (1884-1886)
- Louis-Philippe Sylvain (1886-1894)
- Joseph Cousineau (1894-1895)
- Damas Lafortune (1895-1899)
- Louis-Philippe Sylvain (1899-1904)
- Joseph Cousineau (1904-1905)
- Ovila Robitaille (1905-1907)
- Damas Lafortune (1907)
- Joseph Cousineau (1907)
- Alfred Paulin (1907-1909)
- Gabriel Vaive (1909)
- Alfred Paulin (1909-1911)
- Sylvio Lafortune (1911-1913)
- Mazenod Lafontaine (1913)
- Gabriel Vaive (1913-1914)
- Mazenod R. Lafontaine (1914-1918)
- Rodolphe Moreau (1918-1922)
- Philias Legault (1922-1923)
- Rodolphe Moreau (1923-1924)
- Sylvio Lafortune (1924)
- Ernest Charron (1924-1929)
- Estor Charette (1929-1930)
- Rodolphe Moreau (1930-1943)
- Arthur Moreau (1943-1945)
- Daniel Lafortune (1945-1959)
- Théodore Joly (1959-1961)
- Henri Lapointe (1961-1963)
- Daniel Lafortune (1963-1971)
- Pierre Lafontaine (1971-1973)
- Jean-Marc Cloutier (1973-1975)

=== Templeton (1920-1974) ===
- John Stewart (1920-1924)
- Émile Victor Désy (1924-1929)
- Jean Beauchamp (1929)
- Émile Victor Désy (1929-1934)
- J. Ulderic Leclerc (1934-1936)
- J.E. Campeau (1936-1941)
- Marie-Joseph Schingh (1941-1947)
- Russell Williams (1947-1953)
- David Mitchell (1953-1958)
- Jean-Paul Hurtubise (1958-1961)
- Lucien Dumais (1961-1965)
- Roger Traversy (1965-1967)
- Jean Lorrain (1967-1970)
- François Leclerc (1970-1974)

=== East Templeton (1886-1974) ===
- Alexander McLaurin (1886)
- John McLaurin (1886-1888)
- Archibald S. McLaurin (1888-1889)
- John McLaurin (1889-1894)
- Fabien Campeau (1894-1899)
- Nephtalie Beauchamp (1899-1902)
- Archibald S. McLaurin (1902-1904)
- Nephtalie Beauchamp (1905-1908)
- John Stewart (1908-1912)
- Damase Madore (1912-1916)
- John Stewart (1916-1917)
- Damase Madore (1917-1924)
- Henri-Luc Madore (1924-1925)
- Charles H. Mitchell (1925-1929)
- Paul-Émile Desjardins (1929-1937)
- Allen Williams (1937-1945)
- Josephat Couture (1945-1963)
- Robert Mongeon (1963-1965)
- Josephat Couture (1965-1969)
- Gaëtan Quesnel (1969-1973)
- Gaston Bigras (1973-1974)

=== Eastern East Templeton (1920-1974) ===
- Henri Routhier (1920-1939)
- Josaphat Couture (1939)
- C. Omer Chauret (1939-1947)
- Albert Plouffe (1947-1961)
- Jean-Noël Mongeon (1961-1969)
- Domina Scantland (1969-1972)
- Jean Saint-Louis (1972-1974)

=== West Templeton (1886-1974) ===
- Joseph Laurin (1896-1897)
- John T. Murphy (1897-1900)
- John McGlashan (1900-1902)
- John Laurin (1902-1904)
- John T. Murphy (1904-1906)
- John McGlashan (1906-1907)
- John T. Murphy (1907-1908)
- John Laurin (1908-1910)
- John T. Murphy (1910-1912)
- John Laurin (1912-1914)
- John T. Murphy (1914-1916)
- John Laurin (1916-1917)
- John T. Murphy (1917-1921)
- William A. Scharfe (1921-1923)
- Ferdinand Charette (1923-1925)
- John T. Murphy (1925-1929)
- Ferdinand Charette (1929-1935)
- John E. Williams (1935-1941)
- Charles K. McElroy (1941-1945)
- Edmond Charette (1945-1949)
- Peter A. Murphy (1949-1952)
- George L. Davidson (1952-1949)
- Harry Scullion (1959-1963)
- John Kearns (1963-1967)
- Noël Charette (1967-1974)

=== Touraine (1889-1974) ===
- Alex Prud'homme (1889-1894)
- Robert Kerr (1894-1902)
- Thomas Barrett (1902-1915)
- Allan Fraser (1915-1921)
- Edward Poulin (1921-1933)
- Samuel D. McClelland (1933-1947)
- Gabriel Maloney (1947-1852)
- Alfred Hogan (1952-1955)
- Gabriel Maloney (1955-1957)
- Aldège Godmaire (1957-1959)
- Gabriel Maloney (1959-1961)
- Hervé Maisonneuve (1961-1963)
- Georges St-Jacques (1963-1969)
- Jean-Paul Hébert (1969-1972)
- Donald Poirier (1972-1974)
