= List of Gatineau municipal elections =

This is a list of municipal elections held in Gatineau, Quebec.

== Mayoral election results since 1950 ==
=== 2025 ===
2025 Gatineau municipal election: Mayor
Party	Candidate	Popular vote			Expenditures
Party	Candidate	Votes	%	±%	Expenditures
Action Gatineau	Maude Marquis-Bissonnette	41,569	51.14	+13.49	
Équipe Mario Aubé	Mario Aubé	38,203	47.00	–	
Independent	Rémi Bergeron	1,518	1.87	+0.82	
Total valid votes		82,257	98.12		
Total rejected, unmarked and declined votes		1,576	1.88	+1.13	
Turnout		83,833			
Eligible voters					
Note: Candidate campaign colours, unless a member of a party, are based on the prominent colour used in campaign items (signs, literature, etc.) or colours used in polling graphs and are used as a visual differentiation between candidates.
Sources: Ville de Gatineau

=== 2024 (by-election) ===
2024 Gatineau mayoral by-election Resignation of France Bélisle
Party	Candidate	Popular vote			Expenditures
Party	Candidate	Votes	%	±%	Expenditures
Action Gatineau	Maude Marquis-Bissonnette	27,833	41.70	+4.02	$85,881.58
Independent	Yves Ducharme	20,600	30.87	–	$77,670.15
Independent	Olive Kamanyana	7,253	10.87	–	$71,819.69
Independent	Daniel Feeny	6,539	9.80	–	$26,187.70
Independent	Stéphane Bisson	3,580	5.36	–	$27,090.54
Independent	Rémi Bergeron	499	0.75	-0.26	$0.00
Independent	Mathieu Saint-Jean	435	0.65	–	$463.31
Total valid votes		66,739	99.44		
Total rejected, unmarked and declined votes		379	0.56	-0.19	
Turnout		67,118	33.06	-2.05	
Eligible voters		203,032			
Note: Candidate campaign colours, unless a member of a party, are based on the prominent colour used in campaign items (signs, literature, etc.) or colours used in polling graphs and are used as a visual differentiation between candidates.
Sources: Office of the City Clerk of Gatineau

=== 2021 ===
2021 Gatineau municipal election: Mayor
Party	Candidate	Popular vote			Expenditures
Party	Candidate	Votes	%	±%	Expenditures
Independent	France Bélisle	29,768	42.86	–	$81,079.89
Action Gatineau	Maude Marquis-Bissonnette	26,151	37.65	-7.46	none listed
Independent	Jean-François Leblanc	11,326	16.31	–	$71,309.44
Independent	Jacques Lemay	1,077	1.55	–	$8,206.19
Independent	Rémi Bergeron	727	1.05	–	$0.00
Independent	Abdelhak Lekbabi	411	0.59	–	none listed
Total valid votes		69,460	99.25		
Total rejected, unmarked and declined votes		524	0.75	-0.98	
Turnout		69,984	35.11	-3.41	
Eligible voters		199,302			
Note: Candidate campaign colours, unless a member of a party, are based on the prominent colour used in campaign items (signs, literature, etc.) or colours used in polling graphs and are used as a visual differentiation between candidates.
Sources: Office of the City Clerk of Gatineau and Élections Québec

=== 2017 ===
Party	Mayoral candidate	Vote	%
Équipe Pedneaud-Jobin - Action Gatineau	Maxime Pedneaud-Jobin (X)	33,537	45.14
Independent	Denis Tassé	22,295	30.01
Independent	Sylvie Goneau	12,964	17.45
Independent	Clément Bélanger	3,739	5.03
Independent	Rémi Bergeron	1,761	2.37

=== 2013 ===
Party	Candidate	Vote	%
Action Gatineau	Maxime Pedneaud-Jobin	40,991	52.62
Independent	Marc Bureau (X)	28,146	36.13
Independent	Jacques Lemay	7,492	9.62
Independent	François P. D'Aoust	1,266	1.63

=== 2009 ===
Candidate	Votes	%
Marc Bureau	30929	44.11
Aurèle Desjardins	18551	26.46
Tony Cannavino	17119	24.42
Luc Desjardins	1266	1.81
Roger J. Fleury	1198	1.71
Richard Gravel	1052	1.50

=== 2005 ===
Candidate	Votes	%
Marc Bureau	55650	68.3
Yves Ducharme	25834	31.7

=== 2001 ===
2001 Gatineau municipal election: Mayor
Party	Candidate	Popular vote			Expenditures
Party	Candidate	Votes	%	±%	Expenditures
Independent	Yves Ducharme	47,975	54.39	–	none listed
Independent	Robert Labine	40,227	45.61	-2.71 (Note: The difference is taken from the result of the 1999 Gatineau mayoral election, which was before amalgamation.)	none listed
Total valid votes		88,202	98.65		
Total rejected, unmarked and declined votes		1,203	1.35	-0.07	
Turnout		89,405	53.76	+7.11	
Eligible voters		166,292			
Note: Candidate campaign colours, unless a member of a party, are based on the prominent colour used in campaign items (signs, literature, etc.) or colours used in polling graphs and are used as a visual differentiation between candidates.
Sources: Office of the City Clerk of Gatineau

=== 1999 ===
1999 Gatineau municipal election: Mayor
Party	Candidate	Popular vote			Expenditures
Party	Candidate	Votes	%	±%	Expenditures
Independent	Robert Labine	15,557	48.32	–	none listed
Independent	Berthe Miron	13,824	42.94	–	none listed
Independent	Rosaire Cauchon	2,816	8.75	–	none listed
Total valid votes		32,197	98.58		
Total rejected, unmarked and declined votes		464	1.42	+0.18	
Turnout		32,611	45.35	+0.28	
Eligible voters		72,020			
Note: Candidate campaign colours, unless a member of a party, are based on the prominent colour used in campaign items (signs, literature, etc.) or colours used in polling graphs and are used as a visual differentiation between candidates.
Sources: Ville de Gatineau Archives and Ottawa Citizen

=== 1995 ===
Candidate	Votes	%
Guy Lacroix	16,149	
Jean-Guy Binet	14,070	

=== 1994 (by-election) ===
1994 Gatineau mayoral by-election Resignation of Robert Labine
Party	Candidate	Popular vote			Expenditures
Party	Candidate	Votes	%	±%	Expenditures
Independent	Guy Lacroix	8,755	47.45	–	none listed
Independent	Serge Forget	6,160	33.39	–	none listed
Independent	Yvon Labrecque	2,429	13.17	–	none listed
Independent	Bruno Maranda	1,106	5.99	–	none listed
Total valid votes		18,450	98.36		
Total rejected, unmarked and declined votes		307	1.64	–	
Turnout		18,757	28.50	–	
Eligible voters		65,808			
Note: Candidate campaign colours, unless a member of a party, are based on the prominent colour used in campaign items (signs, literature, etc.) or colours used in polling graphs and are used as a visual differentiation between candidates.
Sources: Ville de Gatineau Archives

=== 1991 ===
Candidate	Votes	%
Robert Labine	22077	
Rosaire Cochon	4691	

=== 1988 (by-election) ===
1988 Gatineau mayoral by-election Resignation of Gaétan Cousineau
Party	Candidate	Popular vote			Expenditures
Party	Candidate	Votes	%	±%	Expenditures
Independent	Robert Labine	9,150	37.98	–	none listed
Independent	Sylvain Simard	8,976	37.26	–	none listed
Independent	Jean Deschênes	4,947	20.53	–	none listed
Independent	Hubert Leroux	1,018	4.23	–	none listed
Total valid votes		24,091	99.10		
Total rejected, unmarked and declined votes		219	0.90	–	
Turnout		24,310	44.63	–	
Eligible voters		54,470			
Note: Candidate campaign colours, unless a member of a party, are based on the prominent colour used in campaign items (signs, literature, etc.) or colours used in polling graphs and are used as a visual differentiation between candidates.
Sources: Ville de Gatineau Archives and Ottawa Citizen

=== 1987 ===
Candidate	Votes	%
Gaétan Cousineau	13569	
John-R. Luck	13390	

=== 1983 ===
Candidate	Votes	%
Gaétan Cousineau	15766	
John-R. Luck	8785	

=== 1979 ===
Candidate	Votes	%
John-R. Luck	12680	
Jean Deschênes	8410	
Sylvio Huneault	3003	

=== 1975 ===
Candidate	Votes	%
John-R. Luck	7556	
Robert Labine	5433	
Donald Poirier	4272	
Jean-Guy Savoie	2164	
Jacques A. Bélisle	1437	

=== 1971 ===
Candidate	Votes	%
John Luck	4,498	61.61
Fernand Philips	2,803	38.39

=== 1968 ===
Candidate	Votes	%
Jacques Poulin	1,271	53.49
Fernand Philips	1,105	46.51

=== 1965 ===
Candidate	Votes	%
Jacques Poulin	1,493	70.76
Zenon Paquette	617	29.24

=== 1962 ===
Candidate	Votes	%
Roland Théorêt	1,333	75.40
Alexandre Primeau	435	24.60

=== 1959 ===
Candidate	Votes	%
Aurèle Graveline	852	52.95
Roland Théorêt	757	47.05

=== 1958 ===
Candidate	Votes	%
Roland Théorêt	786	61.70
Sylvio Blais	488	38.30

=== 1957 (by-election) ===
Candidate	Votes	%
Roland Théorêt	Elected	

=== 1956 ===
Candidate	Votes	%
Eloi Baribeau	501	50.81
Sylvio Blais	254	25.76
J. Léo Smith	231	23.43

=== 1954 ===
Candidate	Votes	%
J. Léo Smith	459	52.88
Armand Dubois	409	47.12

=== 1952 ===
Candidate	Votes	%
J. Léo Smith	Acclaimed	

=== 1950 ===
Candidate	Votes	%
J. Léo Smith	Acclaimed	
