= Action démocratique du Québec candidates in the 2003 Quebec provincial election =

The Action démocratique du Québec (ADQ) party ran a full slate of 125 candidates in the 2003 Quebec provincial election and elected four members to emerge as the third-largest party in the National Assembly.

== Candidates (incomplete) ==
Riding	Candidate's Name	Notes	Gender	Residence	Occupation	Votes	%	Rank
Anjou	Martin Janson	Janson sought election the Commission scolaire de Montréal in 2003 and worked for the municipal Vision Montreal party in the late 2000s.	M			4,319	13.20	3rd
Argenteuil	Sylvain Demers	Demers was a president of a Canadian Auto Workers (CAW) local at a General Motors plant in Boisbriand, Quebec in the late 1990s and early 2000s.	M			4,372	18.44	3rd
Brome—Missisquoi	Pierre Plante	Plante (born 1951) has been a filmmaker since 1980. He made a documentary entitled Le jeu, ça change pas le monde sauf que... in 2000, exploring problem gambling and the practices of Loto-Québec. The work was cited as documentary of the year by the Quebec Cinema Critics Association. He once supported Quebec sovereignty, though he said in 2003 that he no longer considered it to be viable.	M			6,018	18.05	3rd
Chapleau	Berthe Miron	Miron was born in Rouyn-Noranda and was sixty years old during the 2003 election. She was a teacher for thirty years and a municipal councillor in Gatineau from 1983 to 1999. Miron ran for mayor of Gatineau in 1999, without success. In the 2003 election, she endorsed private medical clinics and education vouchers.	F			3,949	13.12	3rd
Gaspé	Denis Paradis	Paradis is a lawyer in Gaspé. He supported Belinda Stronach's bid to lead the Conservative Party of Canada in its 2004 leadership election. Paradis is not to be confused with the former Canadian cabinet minister Denis Paradis.	M			1,743	9.15	3rd
Hochelaga-Maisonneuve	Louise Blackburn	Blackburn has been a candidate in two Montreal municipal elections.	F			2,449	10.40	3rd
Jean-Lesage	Aurel Bélanger	Aurel is an agronomist and data processing specialist. He had worked with the United Nations for sixteen years before the 2003 election, focusing the establishment of coffee plantations. He focused on health issues in the 2003 election.	M			8,912	25.35	3rd
Richelieu	Micheline Ulrich	Ulrich is a nurse and administrator. She co-authored a book entitled Soins d'urgence: perspective infirmière in 1994 and was elected as treasurer of the Ordre des infirmières et infirmiers du Québec in 1996, 1997, and 1998. In 2000, she took part in efforts to recruit nurses to Quebec from France. When the 2003 election was called, she was working for the Ministry of Health and Social Services in the recruitment of infirmary nurses. Considered a prominent ADQ candidate, she represented her party in a high-profile provincial debate on health care.	F			3,756	13.11	3rd

Election	Division	Party	Votes	%	Place	Winner
1983 municipal	Councillor, Ward Seven	n/a			1/?	elected
1987 Gatineau municipal	Councillor, Ward Seven	n/a	1,127	51.77	1/3	herself
1991 municipal	Councillor, Ward Seven	n/a			1/?	elected
1995 municipal	Councillor, Ward Seven	n/a			1/?	elected
1999 municipal	Mayor of Gatineau	n/a	c. 13,800	c. 43	2/3	Robert Labine

Electoral record (partial)
Election	Division	Party	Votes	%	Place	Winner
2001 Montreal municipal	Councillor, Saint-Léonard division	Vision Montreal	6,190	8.02	6/8	Frank Zampino, Yvette Bissonnet, Dominic Perri (all from the Montreal Island Citizens Union)
2009 Montreal municipal	Councillor, Saint-Léonard-Est division	Action civique Montréal	749	9.65	4/4	Robert Zambito, Union Montreal
