= 1987 Quebec municipal elections =

Municipal elections in Quebec, Canada

Several Quebec municipalities held elections on November 1, 1987 to elect mayors and councillors.

== Results ==
=== Gatineau ===
1987 Gatineau municipal election: Mayor of Gatineau
Candidate	Votes	%
Gaétan Cousineau (incumbent)	13,569	50.33
John Luck	13,390	49.67
Total valid votes	26,959	100

Gaétan Cousineau resigned in February 1988. He was replaced by Robert Labine on June 5, 1988
