= Baribeau =

Surname list

Baribeau is the surname of the following people

- Eloi Baribeau (1906–1957), Canadian politician in Quebec
- Jean-Louis Baribeau (1893–1975), Canadian politician
- Paul Baribeau, American folk punk singer
- Théodore Baribeau (1870–1937), Canadian politician in Quebec
