= Bloc Québécois candidates in the 1997 Canadian federal election =

The Bloc Québécois (BQ) ran seventy-five candidates in the 1997 Canadian federal election, covering all of the ridings in the province of Quebec. Forty-four of the party's candidates were elected, giving the Bloc third-place status in the House of Commons of Canada.

Many of the party's candidates have separate biography pages; information about others may be found here.

== Candidates ==
=== Brome—Missisquoi: Noël Lacasse ===
Noël Lacasse was listed as a retired teacher in 1997. He ran for mayor of Magog, Quebec, in 1994 and 1998, without success. He also planned to run for the BQ's nomination in Brome—Missisquoi for a 1995 by-election, but he later agreed to withdraw in favour of high-profile candidate Jean-François Bertrand. In 1997, Lacasse finished third against Liberal Party incumbent Denis Paradis.

Electoral record
Election	Division	Party	Votes	%	Place	Winner
1994 Magog municipal	Mayor of Magog	n/a	-	-	2/2	Denis Lacasse
1997 federal	Brome—Missisquoi	Bloc Québécois	12,652	27.83	3/4	Denis Paradis, Liberal
1998 Magog municipal	Mayor of Magog	n/a	-	-	2/2	Marc Poulin
