= Moussette =

Moussette is a French surname. Notable people with the surname include:

- Alphonse Moussette (1892–1951), Canadian businessman and politician
- Pierre Moussette (1861–1932), French sailor
