= 1983 Quebec municipal elections =

Several municipalities in the Canadian province of Quebec held municipal elections on November 6, 1983, to elect mayors and councillors.

== Results ==
=== Gatineau ===
Mayoral Candidate	Votes	%
Gaétan Cousineau	15766	
John-R. Luck	8785	
