= 1986 Quebec municipal elections =

Several municipalities in the Canadian province of Quebec held mayoral and council elections on November 9, 1986. The most closely watched contest was in Montreal, where Jean Doré was elected to his first term as mayor.

== Results ==
=== Montreal ===
1986 Montreal municipal election: Mayor of Montreal
Party	Candidate	Votes	%
Montreal Citizens' Movement	Jean Doré	230,025	67.70
Civic Party of Montreal	Claude Dupras	99,739	29.35
ADMM	Kenneth Cheung	4,108	1.21
Independent	Marie-Claire Desroches	2,282	0.67
Independent	Gilles Côté	1,676	0.49
Independent	Philip Moscovitch	1,235	0.36
Independent	Ned Dmytryshyn	708	0.21
Total valid votes		339,773	100
Source: Election results, 1833-2005 (in French), City of Montreal.

=== Montréal-Nord ===
1986 Montreal North municipal election: Mayor of Montreal North
Candidate	Votes	%
(x) Yves Ryan	acclaimed	.
Source: "In with the old," Montreal Gazette, 4 November 1986, B2.

=== Cowansville ===
Jacques Charbonneau was elected to his first term as mayor. Future mayor Arthur Fauteux was elected to his first term on council.

=== Longueuil ===
1986 Longueuil municipal election: Councillor, District Nineteen
Party	Candidate	Votes	%
Parti Municipal	Benoit Danault	2,180	73.72
Parti Civique	Jean L'Écuyer	777	26.28
Total valid votes		2,957	100

Source: "Final tally shows size of victory in Longueuil," Montreal Gazette, 6 November 1986, V1.

- Jean L'Écuyer, defeated in the 1986 election, was elected as a school trustee on the Commission scolaire Jacques-Cartier in 1987. In the 2007 provincial election, a candidate named Jean L'Écuyer ran for the Action démocratique du Québec party in Brome—Missisquoi. It is not known if this was the same person.
