= 2009 Cowansville municipal election =

The 2009 Cowansville municipal election was held on November 1, 2009, to elect a mayor and councillors in Cowansville, Quebec. Incumbent mayor Arthur Fauteux was re-elected over former Brigham mayor André Leroux.

== Results ==
2009 Cowansville election, Mayor of Cowansville
Candidate	Total votes	% of total votes
(incumbent)Arthur Fauteux	3,019	63.44
André Leroux	1,740	36.56
Total valid votes	4,759	100.00

- Arthur Fauteux is a veteran politician in Cowansville. He was first elected as an alderman in 1986. He ran for mayor in 1994 and finished second against incumbent Jacques Charbonneau. Fauteux was elected over Charbonneau on his second attempt in 1998 and was re-elected without opposition in 2002 and 2005. In 2001, he announced that Cowansville would dissolve its local police force in favour of Surete du Quebec protection. Before the 2009 election, he said that his focus was on commercial development, infrastructural improvements, and lower residential tax rates.

2009 Cowansville election, Councillor, District One
Candidate	Total votes	% of total votes
Guy Patenaude	226	32.33
Claude Duchesneau	183	26.18
Alfred A Boulet	175	25.04
Réjean Lehoux	115	16.45
Total valid votes	699	100.00

2009 Cowansville election, Councillor, District Two
Candidate	Total votes	% of total votes
Lucille Robert	539	42.88
Barbara Jack	432	34.37
(incumbent)Wayne Yates	286	22.75
Total valid votes	1,257	100.00

2009 Cowansville election, Councillor, District Three
Candidate	Total votes	% of total votes
Ghyslain Vallières	555	56.40
(incumbent)Réal Plourde	259	26.32
Stéphane Ramon Vitesse Tardif	170	17.28
Total valid votes	984	100.00

2009 Cowansville election, Councillor, District Four
Candidate	Total votes	% of total votes
(incumbent)Michel Charbonneau	207	29.28
Bruno St-Martin	172	24.33
Jean-François Morin	157	22.21
Philippe Mercier	157	22.21
Yvan Guénette	14	1.98
Total valid votes	707	100.00

2009 Cowansville election, Councillor, District Five
Candidate	Total votes	% of total votes
(incumbent)Yvon Pepin	346	56.17
Mélanie Robert	180	29.22
Michel Guénette	90	14.61
Total valid votes	616	100.00

2009 Cowansville election, Councillor, District Six
Candidate	Total votes	% of total votes
Sylvie Beauregard	224	41.03
Mario Landry	163	29.85
Mario Dupont	159	29.12
Total valid votes	546	100.00

Source: Official results, Government of Quebec
