= Marie Gibeau =

Canadian politician (1950–2002)

Member of the Canadian Parliament for Bourassa
- In office 1988–1993
- Preceded by: Carlo Rossi
- Succeeded by: Osvaldo Nunez

Personal details
- Born: 11 July 1950 Montreal, Quebec
- Died: 12 February 2002 (aged 51)
- Party: Progressive Conservative

Marie Gibeau (11 July 1950 – 12 February 2002) was a member of the House of Commons of Canada from 1988 to 1993. Her career was in administration.

Gibeau was born in Montreal, Quebec. She studied at the Université du Québec à Montréal and HEC Montréal where she attainend Bachelor of Arts, an education degree (B.Péd) and Master of Business Administration degrees. She worked as a management consultant and was Montreal's YWCA President prior to her federal election campaign.

She was elected in the 1988 federal election at the Bourassa electoral district for the Progressive Conservative party in a close victory over Liberal Carlo Rossi.

She served in the 34th Canadian Parliament after which she was defeated by Bloc Québécois candidate Osvaldo Nunez in the 1993 federal election.
