= Osvaldo Núñez =

Canadian politician

Member of the Canadian Parliament for Bourassa
- In office 1993–1997
- Preceded by: Marie Gibeau
- Succeeded by: Denis Coderre

Personal details
- Born: 10 September 1938 (age 87) Curicó, Chile
- Party: Bloc Québécois
- Occupation: Arbitrator, lawyer, union advisor

Osvaldo Ramón Núñez Riquelme, also known as Osvaldo Nunez (born 10 September 1938 in Curicó, Chile) was a member of the House of Commons of Canada from 1993 to 1997. His career has been in law, arbitration and labour.

Núñez studied law at the University of Chile. He earned a scholarship that allowed him to attend the Catholic University of Louvain in Belgium. He studied social law and industrial relations.

When he returned to Chile in 1969, he became director of union education at the Institute of Labour in Santiago.

In Chile, Núñez was a member of the Christian Democratic Party for ten years. He then became a member of the Popular Unitary Action Movement when it was founded in 1969. During Salvador Allende's government, he was Secretary General of the Superintendency of Banks.

After the 1973 Chilean coup d'état his law office was raided and an arrest warrant was signed for him. He travelled to Canada in 1974 and applied for residency to escape the threat. When Núñez arrived in Montreal he was recruited as a union advisor by an electrical workers' union affiliated with the Quebec Federation of Labour (FTQ). During his 18 years of union activism, he defended immigrant workers, became president of the committee on immigrant workers, a member of the FTQ's general council, and a member of the executive of the Montreal Labour Council. He was also a member of the board of directors of the Quebec League for Rights and Freedoms.

In 1975, he became a founding leader of the Association of Chileans in Quebec.

He became one of the first Chileans to join the New Democratic Party (NDP). While he stated his sympathy to Quebec independence, he thought the NDP most closely aligned with his views on social issues. While in the party, he was responsible for organizing the campaigns of two candidates. He later moved to the Bloc Québécois party.

He was elected in the Bourassa electoral district under the Bloc Québécois party in the 1993 federal election, thus serving in the 35th Canadian Parliament. He became the first Hispanic elected to the federal Parliament. Núñez was criticized by other Chileans during the election for saying "my homeland is Quebec" and still saying he had pride in being a Chilean.

During his time in Parliament, he was appointed Vice-Chair of the House of Commons Standing Committee on Immigration. He advocated to include labour and environmental agreements in the Canada–Chile Free Trade Agreement. He helped create friendship committees between Canada and Latin American countries.

In the 1997 federal election Núñez lost to Liberal Denis Coderre and did not return to Canadian politics. He became chair of the Bloc Québécois' Commission on Cultural Communities and later served as an administrative judge on the Quebec Essential Services Council.

Núñez retired in 2004, though he continued community involvement.
