= Yves Ryan =

Mayor of Montreal North
- In office 1963–2001
- Succeeded by: none (amalgamated into Montreal)

Personal details
- Born: February 28, 1928
- Died: February 2, 2014 (aged 85)

Yves Ryan (28 February 1928 – 2 February 2014) was a Canadian politician in the province of Quebec. He served as the mayor of Montreal North from 1963 until 2001, when the suburban city was amalgamated into the new city of Montreal.

== Family and early career ==
Ryan was the son of Blandine (née Dorion) and Henri-Albert Ryan. He was the youngest brother of Claude Ryan, a prominent politician and journalist in Quebec. Like his brother, he was a newspaper editor before entering political life. He edited Le Montréal-Nord from 1952 to 1956 and later co-founded Le Guide de Montréal-Nord.

== Mayor ==
Ryan was personally involved in many aspects of municipal government and was acknowledged, even by his opponents, as a very popular figure in his city. He was often re-elected without opposition or by large majorities, and he had little difficulty controlling city council through his Renouveau municipale party. In 2005, a journalist in the Montreal Gazette wrote that Ryan was usually able to "direct city business by doing little more than forcefully pointing his cigar butt."

Ryan was also known for his tight budgetary spending; in December 1985, he said that Montreal North had the lowest per-capita spending of all Quebec cities of a comparable size. Montreal North did not introduce a curbside recycling program in the 1990s, largely because Ryan did not want to introduce the requisite tax increase.

In 1999, anti-poverty groups accused Ryan of neglecting low-income housing; he disputed the charge, saying that his administration participated in three provincial programs and had created significantly more units than his opponents suggested. Some critics have charged that Ryan was unwilling to deal with long-term poverty issues in the Montreal North and was ultimately responsible for economic decline in the region.

When Ryan first became mayor of Montreal North, he promised that his community would receive a Metro transit line. He continued to promote the line for most of his time in office but was opposed by other municipal politicians, who argued that it made little sense in a broader urban framework.

== Regional councillor ==
In addition to serving as mayor of Montreal North, Ryan was for many years a member of the regional Montreal Urban Community (MUC). In 1972, he was the main proponent of an accord that brought Montreal Island's twenty-five police forces into a single organization. He later served as president of the MUC's security council, which oversaw the unified force. He announced in 1979 that Montreal would resume issuing English-French bilingual driving tickets, following a Supreme Court of Canada ruling that required bilingual tickets in Manitoba. (Quebec's Charter of the French Language, introduced two years earlier, had mandated that tickets be issued in French only).

Ryan was a member of the Montreal Urban Community Transportation Commission (MUCTC) in the mid-1980s, when the commission consisted of a largely autonomous chairman and two commissioners. In 1985, he supported reforms that put the commission under the control of six elected officials and two citizens. He himself was named as the first chairman of the restructured board (which was renamed the Montreal Urban Community Transit Corporation) in December 1985. He stood down in 1986 and was replaced by Robert Perreault.

Ryan was appointed to a second term as MUCTC chair in 1994, after Perreault was elected to the National Assembly of Quebec. He opposed funding cuts introduced by Montreal mayor Pierre Bourque in 1997, on the grounds that they would jeopardize the future of public transit in the region. During the 1998 municipal election, he complained that candidates in Montreal were not taking transit issues seriously.

Ryan was replaced as MUCTC chair after the 1998 election. In 2001, he complained that transit had suffered cutbacks for too many years, leading to longer wait periods and more crowded buses.

== Amalgamation ==
Ryan was a vocal opponent of the Quebec government's plan to merge all of Montreal's municipalities into a single city, and in late 2000 he played a prominent role in a large street protest in opposition to the plan. The protest was unsuccessful, however, and the amalgamation bill was passed into law on December 20, 2000. Ryan chose to retire in 2001 rather than run for a seat on the new city council.

In 2004, Ryan was appointed by the new provincial government of Jean Charest to chair a committee overseeing the demerger of Longueuil.

== Federal politics ==
Ryan ran for the House of Commons of Canada in the 1968 federal election as a candidate of the Progressive Conservative Party of Canada. Considered one of the party's most prominent Quebec candidates, he was defeated by Liberal Jacques Trudel.

== Electoral results ==
Federal

1968 Canadian federal election: Bourassa
Party	Candidate	Votes	%
Liberal	Jacques Trudel	19,778	55.1
Progressive Conservative	Yves Ryan	10,939	30.5
New Democratic	Gérard Marotte	3,443	9.6
Ralliement créditiste	Gérard Ledoux	1,401	3.9
Unknown	Rolland Denommée	339	0.9
Total valid votes		35,900	100.0

Municipal (incomplete)

1998 Montreal North municipal election: Mayor of Montreal North
Candidate	Votes	%
(x)Yves Ryan	acclaimed	.
Source: "Quebec election results stay true to polls," Montreal Gazette, 3 November 1998, A8.

1994 Montreal North municipal election: Mayor of Montreal North
Candidate	Votes	%
(x) Yves Ryan	16,459	88.40
Jean-Pierre Menard	2,160	11.60
Total valid votes	18,619	100.00
Source: Mike King, "Ryan wins again; Ninth straight victory for patriarch of local mayors," Montreal Gazette, 7 November 1994, A5.

1990 Montreal North municipal election: Mayor of Montreal North
Candidate	Votes	%
(x)Yves Ryan	-	c. 88
Jean-Pierre Menard	-	c. 12
Total valid votes	-	100.00
Source: Mike King, "Ryan wins again; Ninth straight victory for patriarch of local mayors," Montreal Gazette, 7 November 1994, A5. The exact vote totals are not provided.

1986 Montreal North municipal election: Mayor of Montreal North
Candidate	Votes	%
(x) Yves Ryan	acclaimed	.
Source: "In with the old," Montreal Gazette, 4 November 1986, B2.

1982 Montreal North municipal election: Mayor of Montreal North
Candidate	Votes	%
Yves Ryan (incumbent)	22,490	86.27
Suzel Hebert-Godin	3,580	13.73
Total valid votes	26,070	100
Source: Montreal Gazette, 8 November 1994, A6.

1974 Montreal municipal election: Mayor of Montreal North
Candidate	Votes	%
Yves Ryan (incumbent)	14,824	90.12
Paul Rochon	1,625	9.88
Total valid votes	16,449	100
Source: Montreal Star, 4 November 1974, A10.
