= Jacques Trudel =

Canadian politician

Jacques L. Trudel

Member of Parliament for Bourassa/Montreal—Bourassa
- In office June 1968 – March 1979

Personal details
- Born: 13 April 1919 Montreal, Quebec, Canada
- Died: 30 January 2004 (aged 84)
- Party: Liberal
- Profession: police officer, sales manager

Jacques L. Trudel (13 April 1919 – 30 January 2004) was a Liberal party member of the House of Commons of Canada. He was born in Montreal, Quebec and became a police officer and sales manager by career.

He was first elected at the Bourassa riding in the 1968 general election serving in the 28th Canadian Parliament. He was re-elected in the 1972 and 1974 federal elections, when the riding became known as Montreal—Bourassa. Trudel left federal political office after completing his term in the 30th Parliament.

== Electoral record (partial) ==
1968 Canadian federal election: Bourassa
Party	Candidate	Votes	%
Liberal	Jacques Trudel	19,778	55.1
Progressive Conservative	Yves Ryan	10,939	30.5
New Democratic	Gérard Marotte	3,443	9.6
Ralliement créditiste	Gérard Ledoux	1,401	3.9
Unknown	Rolland Denommée	339	0.9
Total valid votes		35,900	100.0
