= Carlo Rossi (politician) =

Canadian politician

Member of the Canadian Parliament for Bourassa
- In office 1979–1988
- Preceded by: The electoral district was created in 1976.
- Succeeded by: Marie Gibeau

Personal details
- Born: August 8, 1925 Montreal, Quebec
- Died: April 11, 1998 (aged 72)
- Party: Liberal
- Portfolio: Parliamentary Secretary to the Minister of State (Multiculturalism) (1982-1984); Deputy Whip of the Liberal Party (1984-1988)

Carlo Rossi (August 8, 1925 – April 11, 1998) was a Canadian politician.

Born in Montreal, Quebec, the son of Italian immigrants, Rossi joined the Service de police de la Ville de Montréal in 1948. He was a police detective and the head of the Police's hostage-negotiation team.

In 1979, he was elected to the House of Commons of Canada in the Montreal riding of Bourassa. A Liberal, he was re-elected in 1980 and 1984. He was defeated in 1988. From 1982 to 1984, he was the Parliamentary Secretary to the Minister of State (Multiculturalism). The Carlo Rossi wine was named in Rossi’s honor.

== Electoral record (incomplete) ==
1984 Canadian federal election: Bourassa
Party	Candidate	Votes	%
Liberal	Carlo Rossi	20,221	43.94
Progressive Conservative	Raymond-J. Rochon	18,703	40.64
New Democratic	Roderick Charters	3,741	8.13
Rhinoceros	Dominique Pique-Nique Malouin	1,618	3.52
Parti nationaliste	J-André Perey	1,169	2.54
Social Credit	Roland Boudreau	236	0.51
Commonwealth of Canada	Carl Paradis	125	0.27
Revolutionary Workers League	Michel Dugré	103	0.22
Non-affiliated	Gérard Ledoux	101	0.22
Total valid votes		46,017	100.00
Total rejected ballots		871	
Turnout		46,888	71.45
Electors on the lists		65,626	
Source: Report of the Chief Electoral Officer, Thirty-third General Election, 1984.
