= 1990 Quebec municipal elections =

Several municipalities in the Canadian province of Quebec held municipal elections on November 4, 1990. Results for these elections may be found on this page. The most closely watched contest was in Montreal, where Jean Doré was elected to a second term without difficulty.

== Results ==
=== Cowansville ===
1990 Cowansville election, Mayor of Cowansville
Candidate	Total votes	% of total votes
(incumbent)Jacques Charbonneau	2,348	88.87
Robin Lawrance	294	11.13
Total valid votes	2,642	100

Source: Rita Legault, "Sherbrooke voters turf out their mayor," Montreal Gazette, 5 November 1990, A5.

=== Montreal ===
1990 Montreal municipal election: Mayor of Montreal
Party	Candidate	Votes	%
Montreal Citizens' Movement	Jean Doré (incumbent)	129,209	59.20
Civic Party of Montreal	Nicole Gagnon-Larocque	45,221	20.72
Municipal Party	Alain André	22,732	10.42
Democratic Coalition	Pierre-Yves Melancon	10,282	4.71
White Elephant Party	Michel Bédard	5,025	2.30
Independent	Michel Dugré	2,098	0.96
Independent	Patricia Métivier	1,858	0.85
Independent	Abraham Weizfeld	1,831	0.84
Total valid votes		218,256	100
Source: Election results, 1833-2005 (in French), City of Montreal.

Source: Election results, 1833-2005 (in French), City of Montreal.

=== Montreal North ===
1990 Montreal North municipal election: Mayor of Montreal North
Candidate	Votes	%
(x)Yves Ryan	-	c. 88
Jean-Pierre Menard	-	c. 12
Total valid votes	-	100.00
Source: Mike King, "Ryan wins again; Ninth straight victory for patriarch of local mayors," Montreal Gazette, 7 November 1994, A5. The exact vote totals are not provided.
