= Bourassa (electoral district) =

Federal electoral district in Quebec, Canada

Coordinates: 45.6145°N 73.6163°W

Quebec electoral district
- Interactive map of riding boundaries from the 2015 federal election

Federal electoral district
- Legislature: House of Commons
MP
Abdelhaq Sari
Liberal
- District created: 1966
- First contested: 1968
- Last contested: 2021
- District webpage: profile, map

Demographics
- Population (2021): 105,637
- Electors (2021): 67,209
- Area (km²): 13.54
- Pop. density (per km²): 7,801.8
- Census division(s): Montreal
- Census subdivision(s): Montreal

Bourassa (French pronunciation: [buʁasa]; formerly known as Montreal—Bourassa) is a federal electoral district in Quebec, Canada, that has been represented in the House of Commons of Canada since 1968. Its population in 2021 was 105,637.

== Geography ==
The district includes Montreal North and the eastern part of the neighbourhood of Sault-au-Récollet in the Borough of Ahuntsic-Cartierville.

The neighbouring ridings are Ahuntsic-Cartierville, Saint-Léonard—Saint-Michel, Honoré-Mercier, and Alfred-Pellan.

== Demographics ==
20.4% of the riding's population are of Haitian ethnic origin, the highest such percentage in Canada.

According to the 2021 Canadian census

Ethnic groups: 45.1% White, 29.4% Black, 11.8% Arab, 7.4% Latin American, 2% Southeast Asian, 1.2% South Asian
Languages: 48.2% French, 7.5% Arabic, 7.5% Haitian Creole, 7.2% Spanish, 5.7% Italian, 4.6% English, 2.8% Creole, 1.8% Kabyle, 1.1% Turkish, 1% Vietnamese
Religions: 60.6% Christian (39.8% Catholic, 2.3% Baptist, 1.8% Pentecostal), 19.3% No Religion, 18% Muslim, 1.1% Buddhist
Median income: $33,200 (2020)
Average income: $38,960 (2020)

== History ==
The electoral district of Bourassa was created in 1966 from Mercier and Laval ridings. The name comes from a street running through the three neighbourhoods which is named after Henri Bourassa.

The name of the riding was changed to "Montreal—Bourassa" in 1971.

In 1976, Montreal—Bourassa was abolished when it was redistributed into a new "Bourassa" riding and Saint-Michel riding. The new Bourassa riding was created from parts of Montreal—Bourassa, Ahuntsic and Anjou—Rivière-des-Prairies ridings.

This riding lost territory to Honoré-Mercier and gained territory from Ahuntsic during the 2012 electoral redistribution.

=== Members of parliament ===
This riding has elected the following members of parliament:

Parliament	Years	Member	Party
Bourassa; Riding created from Mercier and Laval
28th	1968–1972	Jacques Trudel	Liberal
Montreal—Bourassa
29th	1972–1974	Jacques Trudel	Liberal
30th	1974–1979	Jacques Trudel	Liberal
Bourassa
31st	1979–1980	Carlo Rossi	Liberal
32nd	1980–1984	Carlo Rossi	Liberal
33rd	1984–1988	Carlo Rossi	Liberal
34th	1988–1993	Marie Gibeau	Progressive Conservative
35th	1993–1997	Osvaldo Nunez	Bloc Québécois
36th	1997–2000	Denis Coderre	Liberal
37th	2000–2004	Denis Coderre	Liberal
38th	2004–2006	Denis Coderre	Liberal
39th	2006–2008	Denis Coderre	Liberal
40th	2008–2011	Denis Coderre	Liberal
41st	2011–2013	Denis Coderre	Liberal
41st	2013–2015	Emmanuel Dubourg	Liberal
42nd	2015–2019	Emmanuel Dubourg	Liberal
43rd	2019–2021	Emmanuel Dubourg	Liberal
44th	2021–2025	Emmanuel Dubourg	Liberal
45th	2025–present	Abdelhaq Sari	Liberal

== Election results ==
=== Bourassa, 1979–present ===
2025 Canadian federal election
Party	Candidate	Votes	%	±%	Expenditures
Liberal	Abdelhaq Sari	21,198	58.55	-1.84	
Bloc Québécois	Jency Mercier	6,206	17.14	-1.56	
Conservative	Néhémie Dumay	5,905	16.31	+9.31	
New Democratic	Catherine Gauvin	2,137	5.90	-2.10	
People's	Jean-Marc Lamothe	433	1.20	-2.45	
No affiliation	Philippe Tessier	183	0.51		
Marxist–Leninist	Dominique Théberge	140	0.39	N/A	
Total valid votes/expense limit		36,202	97.50		
Total rejected ballots		929	2.50		
Turnout		37,131	56.64		
Eligible voters		65,557			
Liberal hold		Swing		-0.14	
Source: Elections Canada
Note: number of eligible voters does not include voting day registrations.

2021 Canadian federal election
Party	Candidate	Votes	%	±%	Expenditures
Liberal	Emmanuel Dubourg	22,303	60.4	+2.8	
Bloc Québécois	Ardo Dia	6,907	18.7	-3.7	
New Democratic	Nicholas Ponari	2,956	8.0	+0.1	
Conservative	Ilyasa Sykes	2,587	7.0	-0.2	
People's	Michel Lavoie	1,349	3.7	+2.8	
Green	Nathe Perrone	679	1.8	-1.5	
Independent	Michel Prairie	151	0.4	N/A	
Total valid votes		36,932	97.1		
Total rejected ballots		1,086	2.9		
Turnout		38,018	56.6		
Registered voters		67,209			
Liberal hold		Swing		+3.3	
Source: Elections Canada

2019 Canadian federal election
Party	Candidate	Votes	%	±%	Expenditures
Liberal	Emmanuel Dubourg	23,231	57.6	+3.54	$42,025.88
Bloc Québécois	Anne-Marie Lavoie	9,043	22.4	+5.27	$2,855.91
New Democratic	Konrad Lamour	3,204	7.9	-7.04	$0.10
Conservative	Catherine Lefebvre	2,899	7.2	-2.09	none listed
Green	Payton Ashe	1,343	3.3	+1.15	$0.00
People's	Louis Léger	347	0.9	–	$3,418.25
Independent	Joseph Di Iorio	212	0.5	–	$3,793.99
Marxist–Leninist	Françoise Roy	72	0.2	–	$0.00
Total valid votes/expense limit		40,351	100.0		
Total rejected ballots		1,009			
Turnout		41,360	59.1		
Eligible voters		69,996			
Liberal hold		Swing		-0.87	
Source: Elections Canada

2015 Canadian federal election
Party	Candidate	Votes	%	±%	Expenditures
Liberal	Emmanuel Dubourg	22,234	54.06	+5.94	$37,690.66
Bloc Québécois	Gilles Léveillé	7,049	17.13	+4.11	$16,012.89
New Democratic	Dolmine Laguerre	6,144	14.94	-16.5	$3,229.14
Conservative	Jason Potasso-Justino	3,819	9.29	+4.64	$3,258.29
Green	Maxime Charron	886	2.15	+0.14	–
Independent	Julie Demers	669	1.63	–	–
Marxist–Leninist	Claude Brunelle	229	0.56	–	–
Strength in Democracy	Jean-Marie Floriant Ndzana	99	0.24	–	$2,757.07
Total valid votes/Expense limit		41,129	100.0		$204,465.64
Total rejected ballots		859	–	–	
Turnout		41,988	59.2	–	
Eligible voters		70,815			
Liberal hold		Swing		+11.22	
Source: Elections Canada

2011 federal election redistributed results
Party	Vote	%
Liberal	14,585	38.47
New Democratic	12,269	32.36
Bloc Québécois	7,212	19.02
Conservative	3,114	8.21
Green	590	1.56
Others	144	0.38

Canadian federal by-election, November 25, 2013
Party	Candidate	Votes	%	±%	Expenditures
Liberal	Emmanuel Dubourg	8,825	48.12	+7.21	$ 86,108.33
New Democratic	Stéphane Moraille	5,766	31.44	−0.84	87,240.19
Bloc Québécois	Daniel Duranleau	2,387	13.02	−3.04	81,591.19
Conservative	Rida Mahmoud	852	4.65	−4.17	21,442.95
Green	Danny Polifroni	368	2.01	+0.40	34,300.92
Rhinoceros	Serge Lavoie	140	0.76		216.08
Total valid votes/expense limit		18,338	100.0	–	$ 89,016.17
Total rejected ballots		295	1.58	−0.19	
Turnout		18,633	26.22	−28.90	
Eligible voters		69,527			
Liberal hold		Swing		+4.05	
By-election due to the resignation of Denis Coderre.
Source(s) "November 25, 2013 By-elections". Elections Canada. 26 November 2013. "November 25, 2013 By-election – Financial Reports (as reviewed)".

On 16 May 2013, Liberal MP Denis Coderre announced he would resign his seat on 2 June in order to run for Mayor of Montreal. The Chief Electoral Officer received official notification of the vacancy on 3 June 2013 and the by-election had to be called by 30 November 2013.

2011 Canadian federal election
Party	Candidate	Votes	%	±%	Expenditures
Liberal	Denis Coderre	15,550	40.91	-8.89	$82,932.75
New Democratic	Julie Demers	12,270	32.28	+24.29	$2,576.07
Bloc Québécois	Daniel Mailhot	6,105	16.06	-9.36	$35,234.98
Conservative	David Azoulay	3,354	8.82	-4.72	$5,747.39
Green	Tiziana Centazzo	613	1.61	-1.31	$245.29
Marxist–Leninist	Geneviève Royer	121	0.32	-0.01	none listed
Total valid votes/Expense limit		38,013	100.0	–	$ 83,923.41
Total rejected ballots		685	1.77	+0.06	
Turnout		38,698	55.12	-3.20	
Eligible voters		70,207			
Liberal hold		Swing		-16.59	

2008 Canadian federal election
Party	Candidate	Votes	%	±%	Expenditures
Liberal	Denis Coderre	19,869	49.79	+6.38	$79,580.44
Bloc Québécois	Daniel Mailhot	10,145	25.42	−6.55	$20,296.58
Conservative	Michelle Allaire	5,405	13.55	−2.30	$54,889.35
New Democratic	Samira Laouni	3,188	7.99	+2.80	$8,509.18
Green	François Boucher	1,166	2.92	−0.26	$50.79
Marxist–Leninist	Geneviève Royer	130	0.33	−0.07	none listed
Total valid votes/expense limit		39,903	100.0	–	$ 81,509.50
Total rejected ballots		695	1.71	−0.15	
Turnout		40,598	58.32	−1.36	
Electors on the lists		69,612			
Liberal hold		Swing		+6.47 |	
Sources: Official Results, Elections Canada and Financial Returns, Elections Canada.

2006 Canadian federal election
Party	Candidate	Votes	%	±%	Expenditures
Liberal	Denis Coderre	18,705	43.41	-6.63	$74,877
Bloc Québécois	Apraham Niziblian	13,777	31.97	-5.79	$42,887
Conservative	Liberato Martelli	6,830	15.85	+10.53	$16,397
New Democratic	Stefano Saykaly	2,237	5.19	+1.22	$2,513
Green	François Boucher	1,370	3.18	+1.60	$469
Marxist–Leninist	Geneviève Royer	173	0.40	+0.03	
Total valid votes/Expense limit		43,092	100.0	–	$76,351
Total rejected ballots		815	1.86	-0.50	
Turnout		43,907	59.68	+2.68	
Liberal hold		Swing		-0.42	

2004 Canadian federal election
Party	Candidate	Votes	%	±%	Expenditures
Liberal	Denis Coderre	20,927	50.03	-11.35	$71,984
Bloc Québécois	Doris Provencher	15,794	37.76	+9.13	$25,867
Conservative	Frédéric Grenier	2,226	5.32	-1.56	$3,369
New Democratic	Stefano Saykaly	1,661	3.97	+2.15	$8,113
Green	Noémi Lopinto	660	1.57	–	
Marijuana	Philippe Gauvin	403	0.96	–	
Marxist–Leninist	Geneviève Royer	154	0.36	–	
Total valid votes/Expense limit		41,825	100.0	–	$76,415
Total rejected ballots		1,010	2.36		–
Turnout		42,835	57.00	-2.53	–
Liberal hold		Swing		-10.24	

Note: Change based on redistributed results. Conservative vote is compared to the total of the Canadian Alliance vote and Progressive Conservative vote in 2000 election.

2000 Canadian federal election
Party	Candidate	Votes	%	±%	Expenditures
Liberal	Denis Coderre (incumbent)	25,403	62.22		$57,411
Bloc Québécois	Umberto Di Genova	11,462	28.07		$40,416
Alliance	Marcel Lys François	1,435	3.51		$2,028
Progressive Conservative	Marcel Pitre	1,325	3.25		none listed
New Democratic	Richard Gendron	736	1.80		$631
Marxist–Leninist	Claude Brunelle	330	0.81		$10
Communist	Ulises Nitor	137	0.34		$187
Total valid votes		40,828	100.00		
Total rejected ballots		1,248			
Turnout		42,076	62.35		
Electors on the lists		67,488			
Sources: Official Results, Elections Canada and Financial Returns, Elections Canada.

1997 Canadian federal election
Party	Candidate	Votes	%	±%
Liberal	Denis Coderre	23,765	52.2	+10.5
Bloc Québécois	Osvaldo Nunez	14,813	32.5	-9.3
Progressive Conservative	Eric Wildhaber	5,937	13.0	+1.1
New Democratic	Dominique Baillard	999	2.2	-0.4
Total valid votes		45,514	100.0	–

1993 Canadian federal election
Party	Candidate	Votes	%	±%
Bloc Québécois	Osvaldo Nunez	18,234	41.9	–
Liberal	Denis Coderre	18,167	41.7	+0.3
Progressive Conservative	Marie Gibeau	5,199	11.9	-31.4
New Democratic	Raymond Laurent	1,146	2.6	-8.3
Natural Law	Miville Couture	479	1.1	–
Abolitionist	Lucien Lapointe	209	0.5	–
Commonwealth of Canada	Harold Anthony Quesnel	102	0.2	0.0
Total valid votes		43,536	100.0	–

1988 Canadian federal election
Party	Candidate	Votes	%	±%
Progressive Conservative	Marie Gibeau	18,979	43.3	+2.7
Liberal	Carlo Rossi	18,159	41.5	-2.5
New Democratic	Kéder Hyppolite	4,797	11.0	+2.8
Rhinoceros	Patrick Pi L'Autre Cossette	882	2.0	-1.5
Green	Michel Szabo	396	0.9	–
Social Credit	Gérard Ledoux	178	0.4	-0.1
Communist	Claire Dasylva	159	0.4	–
Independent	Stéphane Savard	125	0.3	–
Commonwealth of Canada	Daniel Coté	107	0.2	–
Total valid votes		43,782	100.0	–

1984 Canadian federal election
Party	Candidate	Votes	%	±%
Liberal	Carlo Rossi	20,221	43.9	-32.5
Progressive Conservative	Raymond-J. Rochon	18,703	40.6	+32.8
New Democratic	Roderick Charters	3,741	8.1	-4.6
Rhinoceros	Dominique Pique-Nique Malouin	1,618	3.5	–
Parti nationaliste	J. André Perey	1,169	2.5	–
Social Credit	Roland Boudreau	236	0.5	–
Commonwealth of Canada	Carl Paradis	125	0.3	–
Independent	Michel Dugré	103	0.2	–
Independent	Gérard Ledoux	101	0.2	–
Total valid votes		46,017	100.0	–

1980 Canadian federal election
Party	Candidate	Votes	%	±%
Liberal	Carlo Rossi	30,924	76.5	+14.0
New Democratic	Roderick Charters	5,144	12.7	+9.0
Progressive Conservative	Raymond J. Rochon	3,182	7.9	+0.1
Union populaire	Henriette Duval	875	2.2	+0.8
Marxist–Leninist	Pierre Daumery	305	0.8	+0.5
Total valid votes		40,430	100.0	–

1979 Canadian federal election
Party	Candidate	Votes	%	±%
Liberal	Carlo Rossi	29,929	62.5	+2.5
Social Credit	Gérard Rougeau	5,178	10.8	-1.0
Independent	Raymond Cloutier	4,918	10.3	–
Progressive Conservative	J. Raymond Rochon	3,705	7.7	-9.2
New Democratic	Daniel Piotrowski	1,804	3.8	-5.1
Rhinoceros	Victor-Levy Beaulieu	1,492	3.1	+1.6
Union populaire	Jacques Bergeron	635	1.3	–
Marxist–Leninist	Pierre Daumery	103	0.2	-0.2
Communist	Suzanne Dagenais	102	0.2	-0.3
Total valid votes		47,866	100.0	–

=== Montreal—Bourassa, 1972–1979 ===
1974 Canadian federal election
Party	Candidate	Votes	%	±%
Liberal	Jacques Trudel	26,550	60.0	+8.3
Progressive Conservative	Armand Lefebvre	7,500	16.9	-1.2
Social Credit	Gérard Ledoux	5,218	11.8	-9.1
New Democratic	Robert-F. Faucher	3,912	8.8	-0.4
Independent	Victor-Lévy Beaulieu	673	1.5	–
Communist	Ginette Poirier	213	0.5	–
Marxist–Leninist	Marc Blouin	194	0.4	–
Total valid votes		44,260	100.0	–

1972 Canadian federal election
Party	Candidate	Votes	%	±%
Liberal	Jacques Trudel	25,728	51.7	-3.4
Social Credit	Gérard Ledoux	10,418	20.9	+17.0
Progressive Conservative	Rodolphe Sauvé	9,054	18.2	-12.3
New Democratic	Sid-A. Zitouni	4,601	9.2	-0.4
Total valid votes		49,801	100.0	–

Note: Social Credit vote is compared to Ralliement créditiste vote in the 1968 election.

=== Bourassa, 1968–1972 ===
1968 Canadian federal election
Party	Candidate	Votes	%
Liberal	Jacques Trudel	19,778	55.1
Progressive Conservative	Yves Ryan	10,939	30.5
New Democratic	Gérard Marotte	3,443	9.6
Ralliement créditiste	Gérard Ledoux	1,401	3.9
Unknown	Rolland Denommée	339	0.9
Total valid votes		35,900	100.0

== See also ==
- List of Canadian electoral districts
- Historical federal electoral districts of Canada
