= Éraste d'Odet d'Orsonnens =

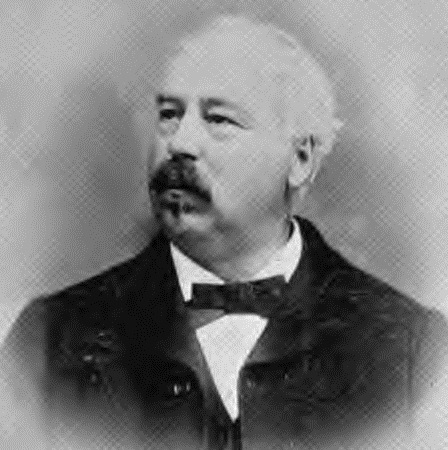

Mayor of Hull, Quebec
- In office 1889–1890

Personal details
- Born: April 11, 1836; Saint-Roch-de-l'Achigan, Lower Canada
- Died: December 24, 1906; Hull, Quebec

Éraste d'Odet d'Orsonnens (April 11, 1836 – December 24, 1906) was a notary, author and politician in Quebec. He served as mayor of Hull from 1889 to 1890. His name also appears as Jean-Éraste and Jean Protais Eraste.

The son of Colonel Protais d'Odet d'Orsonnens and Louise-Sophie Rocher, he was born in Saint-Roch-de-l'Achigan, Lower Canada, and was educated at L'Assomption and at the Jesuit college in Montreal. He went on to study law and was licensed as a notary at the age of 22. D'Orsonnens practised his profession in Montreal, Warwick and Hull. In 1875, he married Marie-Louise Fiset. D'Orsonnens was also a commissioner of the Superior Court of Quebec and chair of the Hull school board. Around the age of 50, he retired from practice as a notary to pursue his developing business. He served on Hull municipal council from 1877 to 1886 and from 1890 to 1891.

He published:

- Felluna, la vierge iroquoise ; Une épluchette de blé-d'inde ; Une résurrection (1856) which is described as the first collection of stories published in Lower Canada
- Une apparition : épisode de l'émigration irlandaise au Canada (1860)
- Le moteur centripète (1899)

Rue D'Orsonnens in Hull, now part of Gatineau, was named in his honour.
