= 1987 Gatineau municipal election =

An election was held on November 1, 1987, to elect a mayor and councillors in Gatineau, Quebec, Canada. Incumbent mayor Gaétan Cousineau was narrowly re-elected over a challenge from former mayor John Luck.

== Results ==
=== Mayor ===
1987 Gatineau municipal election: Mayor of Gatineau
Candidate	Votes	%
Gaétan Cousineau (incumbent)	13,569	50.33
John Luck	13,390	49.67
Total valid votes	26,959	100

=== Council ===
1987 Gatineau election, Councillor, District One
Candidate	Total votes	% of total votes
Michel Charbonneau	1,205	42.53
Simon Racine	704	24.85
Andre Gregoire	601	21.21
De Sale Gauthier	323	11.40
Total valid votes	2,833	100.00

1987 Gatineau election, Councillor, District Two
Candidate	Total votes	% of total votes
Therese Cyr	1,542	46.45
Daniel Moreau	1,525	45.93
Carole Malouin	253	7.62
Total valid votes	3,320	100.00

1987 Gatineau election, Councillor, District Three
Candidate	Total votes	% of total votes
(incumbent)Gilbert Garneau	1,169	60.92
Michel Gobeil	452	23.55
Alcide Beaulne	298	15.53
Total valid votes	1,919	100.00

1987 Gatineau election, Councillor, District Four
Candidate	Total votes	% of total votes
Richard Canuel	1,108	54.61
(incumbent)Hubert Leroux	921	45.39
Total valid votes	2,029	100.00

1987 Gatineau election, Councillor, District Five
Candidate	Total votes	% of total votes
Helene Theoret	573	22.39
(incumbent)Guy Lacroix	517	20.20
Gilles Trahan	390	15.24
Roger Fortin	312	12.19
Paul Lavoie	304	11.88
Raymond Gosselin	159	6.21
Florent Cadotte	153	5.98
Gaetan Dube	151	5.90
Total valid votes	2,559	100.00

1987 Gatineau election, Councillor, District Six
Candidate	Total votes	% of total votes
(incumbent) Claire Vaive	accl.	

1987 Gatineau municipal election: Councillor, Ward Seven
Candidate	Votes	%
(x) Berthe Miron	1,127	51.77
Michel Seguin	622	28.57
Pierre Lefebvre	428	19.66
Total valid votes	2,177	100

1987 Gatineau election, Councillor, District Eight
Candidate	Total votes	% of total votes
(incumbent)Richard Migneault	1,434	76.07
Annette Laurin	451	23.93
Total valid votes	1,885	100.00

1987 Gatineau election, Councillor, District Nine
Candidate	Total votes	% of total votes
(incumbent)Rene-Jean Monnette	accl.	

1987 Gatineau election, Councillor, District Ten
Candidate	Total votes	% of total votes
Richard Cote	1,375	56.61
(incumbent)Jacques Vezina	745	30.67
Gerald Joly	309	12.72
Total valid votes	2,429	100.00

1987 Gatineau election, Councillor, District Eleven
Candidate	Total votes	% of total votes
(incumbent)François Leclerc	1,064	52.13
Catherine Filion	977	47.87
Total valid votes	2,041	100.00

1987 Gatineau election, Councillor, District Twelve
Candidate	Total votes	% of total votes
Marlene Goyet	1,088	42.55
Irene Schingh-Seguin	557	21.78
(incumbent)Charles Vaillancourt	408	15.96
Michel Constantineau	371	14.51
Lary Seguin	133	5.20
Total valid votes	2,557	100.00

=== Post-election changes ===
Gaétan Cousineau resigned as mayor in early 1988, and a by-election was held to choose his replacement.

- Jean Deschênes was born on March 26, 1940, in Sainte-Flavie, Quebec. He has a Bachelor of Arts degree from the University of Ottawa, began working as a school principal in 1972, and later received a Master of Public Administration degree. Deschênes first ran for mayor of Gatineau in 1979, losing to incumbent John Luck, and ran a second time in a by-election called after the resignation of Gaetan Cousineau in 1988. He highlighted his skills as an administrator and sought a municipal tax freeze in the latter campaign. Despite an endorsement from Luck, he finished third against Robert Labine. He was later elected to the Gatineau city council in 1995, representing the city's fifth ward. In 1996, Deschênes was arrested by Gatineau police under very controversial circumstances while returning home from a charity function; despite passing three breathalyzer tests, he was taken to the station in handcuffs and given a fourth test before being released. The officers were later reprimanded for not following proper procedure. At the time of the incident, Deschênes chaired a city committee that was looking into cutbacks for city staff, including the police; he, and many others, later described the police actions as intimidation and harassment. He was narrowly defeated by Joseph de Sylva in 1999. He also sought election in 2001, but was defeated. Deschênes has been active in the Liberal Party of Canada.
- Hubert Leroux was born in Hawkesbury, Ontario. An insurance broker, he served on the Gatineau city council from 1979 to 1987. Known as a maverick politician, Leroux was one of only two councillors to vote against the city's 1986 budget, arguing that more spending cuts could have been made. He also opposed Mayor Gaétan Cousineau's plans for a new city hall building. He lost to Richard Canuel in the 1987 election. He was forty-eight years old during the 1988 election and described himself as a "small-c" conservative. The latter point notwithstanding, he called for a significant business tax increase to keep property taxes down.

1988 Gatineau mayoral by-election Resignation of Gaétan Cousineau
Party	Candidate	Popular vote			Expenditures
Party	Candidate	Votes	%	±%	Expenditures
Independent	Robert Labine	9,150	37.98	–	none listed
Independent	Sylvain Simard	8,976	37.26	–	none listed
Independent	Jean Deschênes	4,947	20.53	–	none listed
Independent	Hubert Leroux	1,018	4.23	–	none listed
Total valid votes		24,091	99.10		
Total rejected, unmarked and declined votes		219	0.90	–	
Turnout		24,310	44.63	–	
Eligible voters		54,470			
Note: Candidate campaign colours, unless a member of a party, are based on the prominent colour used in campaign items (signs, literature, etc.) or colours used in polling graphs and are used as a visual differentiation between candidates.
Sources: Ville de Gatineau Archives and Ottawa Citizen

Sources: "Final official results of weekend Outaouais civic elections," Ottawa Citizen, 6 November 1987, C3; "Cousineau wins, Luck continues to contest result" [mayoral recount], Ottawa Citizen, 16 November 1987, C1; David Gamble, "Labine wins tight race for mayor in Gatineau," Ottawa Citizen, 6 June 1988, A1.
