= 1970 Quebec municipal elections =

Several municipalities in the Canadian province of Quebec held municipal elections to elect mayors and councillors on October 25, 1970.

The most closely watched contest was in Montreal, where the election took place against the backdrop of the FLQ Crisis. Incumbent mayor Jean Drapeau was re-elected by a landslide and his party won every seat on the city council.

== Results ==
=== Montreal ===
1970 Montreal municipal election: Mayor of Montreal
| Candidate | Votes | % |
|---|---|---|
| (x)Jean Drapeau | 339,215 | 91.89 |
| André Desmarais | 11,072 | 3.00 |
| Manon Leger | 7,189 | 1.95 |
| Joseph Abraham | 3,831 | 1.04 |
| Jean-Guy Robillard | 3,492 | 0.95 |
| Claude Longtin | 3,442 | 0.93 |
| Lucien Monette | 1,269 | 0.34 |
| Total valid votes | 369,150 | 100 |
Source: Election results, 1833-2005 (in French), City of Montreal.

Source: Election results, 1833-2005 (in French), City of Montreal.
