= 2002 Quebec municipal elections =

- November 3, 2002

One hundred and seventy-two municipalities in the Canadian province of Quebec held mayoral and council elections in late 2002. Most held their elections on November 3, although a small number chose alternate dates.

== Results ==
2002 Cowansville election, Mayor of Cowansville
Candidate	Total votes	% of total votes
(incumbent)Arthur Fauteux	accl.	.

Source for results: "Election 2002 Eastern Townships," Sherbrooke Record, 4 November 2002, p. 4.
