= Jean-Marie Séguin =

Jean-Marie Séguin (January 27, 1929 – August 21, 2011) was an educator, insurance broker and politician in Quebec. He served as mayor of Hull from 1972 to 1974.

Séguin was born in Hull. He was a member of Hull city council from 1964 to 1975. Séguin served as head of the Communauté régionale de l'Outaouais from 1972 to 1974 and was head of the Société d'aménagement de l'Outaouais from 1987 to 1992. Séguin led the "No" campaign in the Outaouais during the first Quebec referendum on sovereignty held in 1980.

He died from cancer at the age of 82.
