= Edmond Stanislas Aubry =

Edmond Stanislas Aubry (July 29, 1860 – October 19, 1936) was a physician, surgeon and politician in Quebec. He served as mayor of Hull from 1893 to 1895 and from 1905 to 1906.

The son of Stanislas Aubry and Elmire Biroleau dit Lafleur, he was born in Sainte-Scholastique (later known as Mirabel), Canada East. In 1888, he married Marie-Antoinette Charron. With three other doctors, Aubry founded the Association Médicale du Comté d'Ottawa in 1908 and served as its president. He was a member of Hull municipal council from 1888 to 1892 and from 1899 to 1900. Aubry was the first mayor elected by popular vote; earlier mayors had been elected by a vote of the council.

In 1908, he built a large residence in Hull which is now considered a heritage building. From 1919 to 1929, part of the building was rented to a bank, the Banque de Hochelaga. Aubry also owned property in Templeton, Low and Bouchette townships.

Place Aubry and Rue Aubry in Gatineau were named in his honour.
