= 1994 Quebec municipal elections =

Several municipalities in the Canadian province of Quebec held mayoral and council elections on November 6, 1994. The most closely watched contest was in Montreal, where Pierre Bourque was elected to his first term as mayor.

== Results ==
=== Montreal ===
1994 Montreal municipal election: Mayor of Montreal
Party	Candidate	Votes	%
Vision Montreal	Pierre Bourque	135,678	47.61
Montreal Citizens' Movement	(x)Jean Doré	91,907	32.25
Montrealers' Party	Jérôme Choquette	37,214	13.06
Democratic Coalition–Ecology Montreal	Yolande Cohen	12,737	4.47
White Elephant Party	Michel Bédard	2,678	0.94
Independent	Carole Caron	1,433	0.50
Independent	Jean-Luc Bonspiel	973	0.34
Independent	Glenmore Browne	818	0.29
Independent	Patricia Métivier	709	0.25
Independent	Carl Zephir	438	0.15
Independent	Marc Rainville	379	0.13
Total valid votes		284,964	100
Source: Official results, City of Montreal.

=== Montréal-Nord ===
1994 Montreal North municipal election: Mayor of Montreal North
Candidate	Votes	%
(x) Yves Ryan	16,459	88.40
Jean-Pierre Menard	2,160	11.60
Total valid votes	18,619	100.00
Source: Mike King, "Ryan wins again; Ninth straight victory for patriarch of local mayors," Montreal Gazette, 7 November 1994, A5.

=== Cowansville ===
1994 Cowansville election, Mayor of Cowansville
Candidate	Total votes	% of total votes
(incumbent)Jacques Charbonneau	2,244	51.21
Arthur Fauteux	1,811	41.33
Pierre Rioux	327	7.46
Total valid votes	4,382	100.00

=== Magog ===
1994 Magog election, Mayor of Magog
Candidate	Total votes	% of total votes
Denis Lacasse	elected	
Noël Lacasse	defeated	

Results from outside of Montreal are taken from Claude Arpin, "MUNICIPAL ELECTIONS Eastern Townships," Montreal Gazette, 7 November 1994, A5.
