= John-R. Luck =

12th & 14th Mayor of Gatineau
- In office 1975–1983
- Preceded by: Donald Poirier
- Succeeded by: Gaétan Cousineau
- In office 1971–1975
- Preceded by: Ludovic Routhier
- Succeeded by: Donald Poirier

Personal details
- Born: June 12, 1928
- Died: July 25, 1988 (aged 60)
- Party: Action-Gatineau

John-R. Luck (June 12, 1928 – July 25, 1988) was a Canadian politician who served as Mayor of Gatineau from 1971 to 1975 and again from 1975 to 1983. He was elected as the city's first mayor after a major amalgamation and incorporation in 1975 of the communities of Pointe-Gatineau, Templeton, East Templeton, West Templeton, Cantley, and Touraine. In the same election, residents voted in a referendum for the name of the new city to be the Ville de Gatineau. He is a former employee of the Canadian International Paper Company, where he worked for 30 years. He also served on Gatineau City Council from 1962 to 1971. He was defeated by Gaétan Cousineau in 1983 for re-election.
