= Alphonse Moussette =

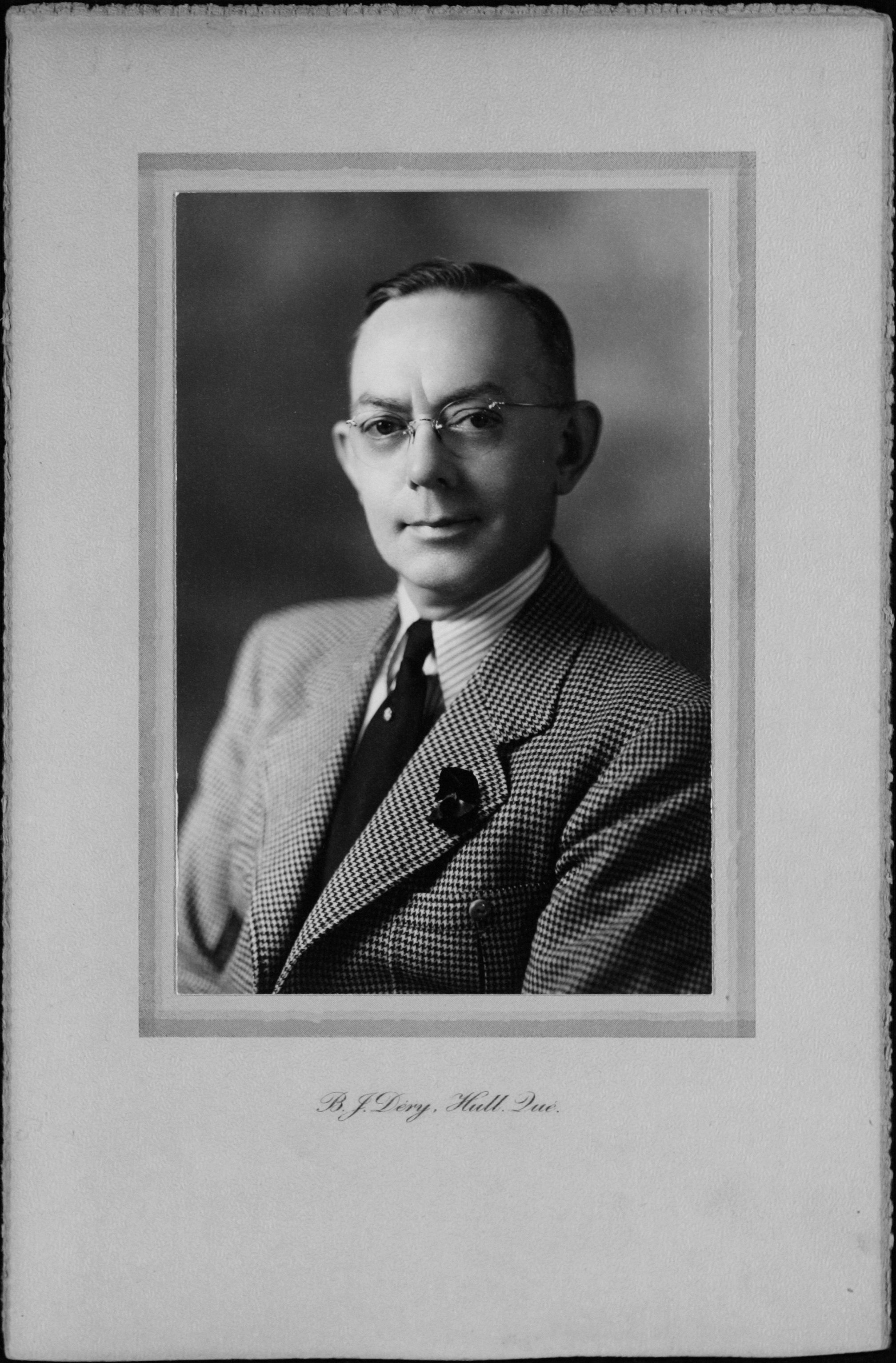

Alphonse Moussette (July 18, 1892 – September 13, 1951) was a business owner and mayor of Hull, Quebec, now part of the city of Gatineau, from 1936 to 1940 and from 1948 to 1951. He served on Hull city council from 1926 to 1931.

== Background and early life ==
He was born in Aylmer, the son of Antoine Moussette and Almédine Beaudette.

== Multiple roles ==
Before entering municipal politics, he served as chief inspector for the Quebec Liquor Commission for the counties of Hull, Pontiac and Papineau, as bailiff for the Quebec Superior Court for Hull district.

Mousette owned theatres in Hull, Aylmer and Masson. He also owned the Avalon club in Hull.

=== Controversy ===
An inquiry into the Hull police in 1943 found that Moussette and several city councillors had protected houses of prostitution and illegal gaming against prosecution by the police.

== Death and legacy ==
He died at the Sacré-Coeur Hospital in Hull at the age of 59 following a serious illness.

Moussette Beach in the Val-Tétreau neighbourhood of Gatineau was named in his honour.
