= Théodore Baribeau =

Canadian politician

Théodore Baribeau (March 1, 1870 – December 31, 1937) was a Quebec politician. He served as the first mayor of Gatineau, Quebec from 1933 to 1937.

The son of Louis Baribeau and Ezoire Dufresne, he was born in Sainte-Geneviève, Quebec and operated a general store at Lac-Sainte-Marie for many years. In 1906, he married Lucia Lacroix. On his retirement in 1929, he moved to what was then known as Gatineau Mills, a company town for Canadian International Paper. Baribeau retired from municipal politics due to poor health. He died at home in Gatineau at the age of 67.

His son Eloi later also served as Gatineau mayor.
