= Ludovic Routhier =

Canadian politician (1921–2018)

Ludovic Routhier (July 21, 1921 – January 31, 2018) was a Canadian politician in Quebec. He served as mayor of Gatineau in 1971.

== Life and career ==
Ludovic Routhier was born in Buckingham on July 21, 1921, and was educated in Gatineau. He played ice hockey at the junior and senior level. Routhier worked at the McIntyre Mines in Timmins, Ontario and then was a member of the Canadian Armed Forces until 1945. He married Yolande Barbarie in 1947. Routhier was a machinist at the Canadian International Paper plant in Gatineau from 1954 until his retirement in 1982.

He served on Gatineau municipal council from 1964 to 1970 and then was mayor from July to September of the following year.

Routhier died on January 31, 2018, at the age of 96.
