= Eloi Baribeau =

Mayor of Gatineau from 1956 to 1957

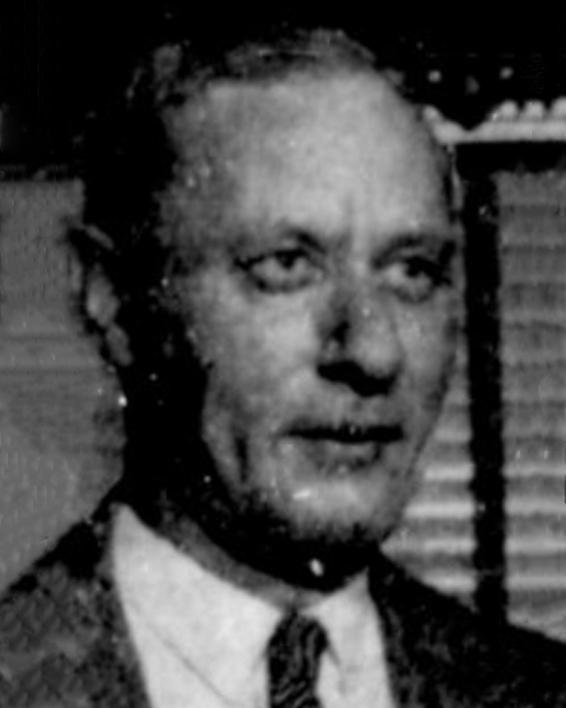
- Baribeau in the Ottawa Citizen in 1957

6th Mayor of Gatineau
- In office February 1, 1956 – July 28, 1957
- Preceded by: J. Léo Smith
- Succeeded by: Roland Théorêt

Gatineau City Councillor
- In office May 15, 1944 – March 11, 1953
- Preceded by: David Gaulin
- Succeeded by: Maurice Baribeau
- Constituency: District 2

Personal details
- Born: December 1, 1906 Lac-Sainte-Marie, Quebec, Canada
- Died: July 28, 1957 (aged 50) Cayamant, Quebec, U.S.
- Party: Independent
- Spouse: Lucienne Charron
- Parents: Théodore Baribeau; Lucia Lacroix
- Education: Collège Bourget

Eloi Baribeau (December 1, 1906 – July 28, 1957) was a Canadian business owner and politician in Quebec. He served as mayor of Gatineau, Quebec from 1956 to 1957.

The son of former Gatineau mayor Théodore Baribeau and Lucia Lacroix, he was born in Lac-Sainte-Marie, Quebec. He was educated at Bourget College in Rigaud. He moved to Gatineau Mills, later part of Gatineau, with his parents in 1928 and afterwards opened a service station there. In 1940, Baribeau married Lucienne Charron. He served nine years on Gatineau council before becoming mayor in 1956. Baribeau died in office when he drowned after falling out of a boat in Whitefish Lake near Gracefield.
