= 1999 Quebec municipal elections =

- November 7, 1999

The Canadian province of Quebec held municipal elections in several communities in November 1999. Some results from these elections are included on this page.

== Aylmer ==
Candidate	Votes	%
Marc Croteau (X)	Acclaimed	

== Bécancour ==
1999 Bécancour municipal election: Mayor
Candidate	Votes	%
(x)Maurice Richard	acclaimed	.
Source: Biography: Maurice Richard, National Assembly of Quebec, accessed 14 May 2011.

== Gatineau ==
1999 Gatineau municipal election
- Mayoral election
- November 7, 1999
- Registered: 72,020
- Turnout: 45.35 (▲0.28pp)
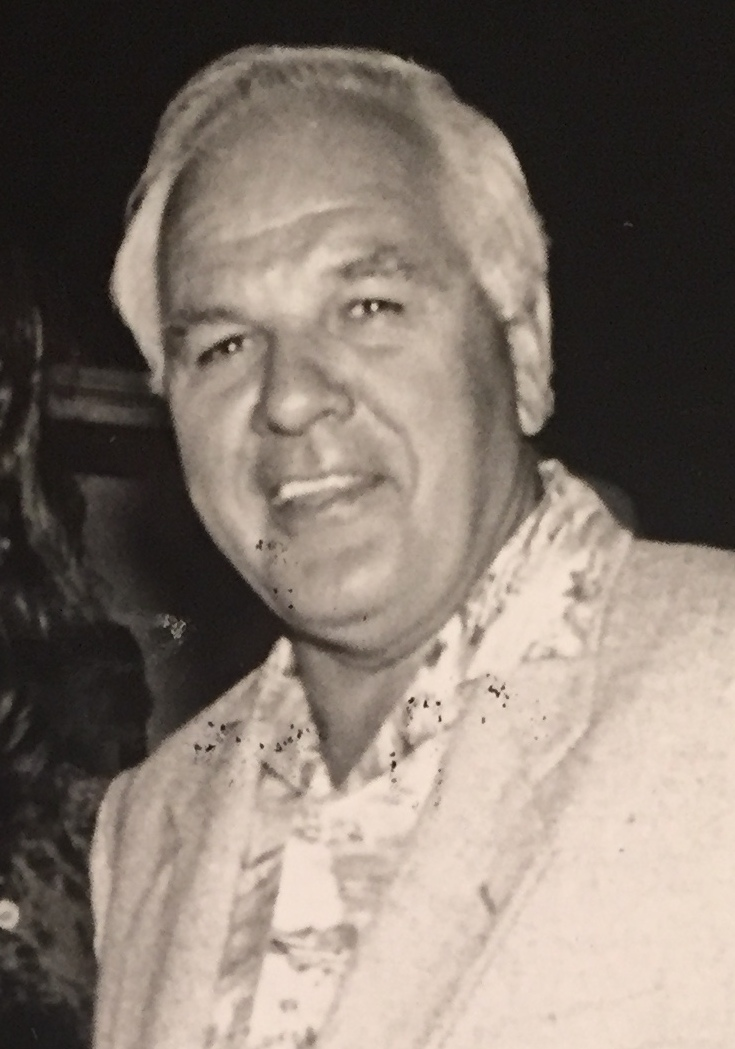
		BM
Nominee	Robert Labine	Berthe Miron
Party	Independent	Independent
Popular vote	15,557	13,824
Percentage	48.32%	42.94
Mayor before election
Guy Lacroix
Independent
Elected mayor
Robert Labine
Independent
- City Council election
- November 7, 1999
- 12 seats in Gatineau City Council (Note: The Mayor is a member of City Council, but for the purposes of documentation is treated as their own individual.); 7 seats needed for a majority
Party	Leader	Vote %	Seats	+/–
Independent	–	100.00	12	0
This lists parties that won seats. See the complete results below.

=== Mayoral race ===
1999 Gatineau municipal election: Mayor
Party	Candidate	Popular vote			Expenditures
Party	Candidate	Votes	%	±%	Expenditures
Independent	Robert Labine	15,557	48.32	–	none listed
Independent	Berthe Miron	13,824	42.94	–	none listed
Independent	Rosaire Cauchon	2,816	8.75	–	none listed
Total valid votes		32,197	98.58		
Total rejected, unmarked and declined votes		464	1.42	+0.18	
Turnout		32,611	45.35	+0.28	
Eligible voters		72,020			
Note: Candidate campaign colours, unless a member of a party, are based on the prominent colour used in campaign items (signs, literature, etc.) or colours used in polling graphs and are used as a visual differentiation between candidates.
Sources: Ville de Gatineau Archives and Ottawa Citizen

=== City Council ===
1999 Gatineau municipal election: Limbour
Party	Candidate	Popular vote			Expenditures
Party	Candidate	Votes	%	±%	Expenditures
Independent	Jean-Guy Binet	2,227	69.79	–	none listed
Independent	Gabriel St-Louis	964	30.21	–	none listed
Total valid votes		3,191	99.10		
Total rejected, unmarked and declined votes		29	0.90	-1.12	
Turnout		3,220	46.19	-6.37	
Eligible voters		6,972			
Note: Candidate campaign colours, unless a member of a party, are based on the prominent colour used in campaign items (signs, literature, etc.) or colours used in polling graphs and are used as a visual differentiation between candidates.
Sources: Ville de Gatineau Archives

1999 Gatineau municipal election: Touraine
Party	Candidate	Popular vote			Expenditures
Party	Candidate	Votes	%	±%	Expenditures
Independent	Thérèse Cyr	1,569	52.46	-16.94	none listed
Independent	Jacaques Morin	1,422	47.54	–	none listed
Total valid votes		2,991	98.91		
Total rejected, unmarked and declined votes		33	1.09	-0.57	
Turnout		3,024	50.56	-2.16	
Eligible voters		5,981			
Note: Candidate campaign colours, unless a member of a party, are based on the prominent colour used in campaign items (signs, literature, etc.) or colours used in polling graphs and are used as a visual differentiation between candidates.
Sources: Ville de Gatineau Archives

1999 Gatineau municipal election: Ruisseau
Party	Candidate	Popular vote			Expenditures
Party	Candidate	Votes	%	±%	Expenditures
Independent	Marcel Schryer	850	36.92	–	none listed
Independent	Marco Leblanc	788	34.23	–	none listed
Independent	Luc Angers	664	28.84	–	none listed
Total valid votes		2,302	98.63		
Total rejected, unmarked and declined votes		20	1.37	–	
Turnout		2,334	47.33	–	
Eligible voters		4,931			
Note: Candidate campaign colours, unless a member of a party, are based on the prominent colour used in campaign items (signs, literature, etc.) or colours used in polling graphs and are used as a visual differentiation between candidates.
Sources: Ville de Gatineau Archives

2001 Gatineau municipal election: Baron
Party	Candidate	Popular vote			Expenditures
Party	Candidate	Votes	%	±%	Expenditures
Independent	Richard Canuel	Acclaimed	–	–	none listed
Total valid votes		–	–		
Total rejected, unmarked and declined votes		–	–	–	
Turnout		–	–	–	
Eligible voters		–			
Note: Candidate campaign colours, unless a member of a party, may be based on the prominent colour used in campaign items (signs, literature, etc.) or colours used in polling graphs and are used as a visual differentiation between candidates.
Sources: Ville de Gatineau Archives

1999 Gatineau municipal election: Montée-Paiement
Party	Candidate	Popular vote			Expenditures
Party	Candidate	Votes	%	±%	Expenditures
Independent	Joseph De Sylva	1,855	50.81	–	none listed
Independent	Jean Deschênes	1,796	49.19	+13.17	none listed
Total valid votes		3,651	99.16		
Total rejected, unmarked and declined votes		31	0.84	-0.96	
Turnout		3,682	52.33	+8.62	
Eligible voters		6,918			
Note: Candidate campaign colours, unless a member of a party, are based on the prominent colour used in campaign items (signs, literature, etc.) or colours used in polling graphs and are used as a visual differentiation between candidates.
Sources: Ville de Gatineau Archives

1999 Gatineau municipal election: Centre-Ville
Party	Candidate	Popular vote			Expenditures
Party	Candidate	Votes	%	±%	Expenditures
Independent	Jacques-R. Forget	1,647	50.44	-17.23	none listed
Independent	Claire Vaive	1,618	49.56	–	none listed
Total valid votes		3,265	98.79		
Total rejected, unmarked and declined votes		40	1.21	-0.59	
Turnout		3,305	46.86	+3.15	
Eligible voters		7,052			
Note: Candidate campaign colours, unless a member of a party, are based on the prominent colour used in campaign items (signs, literature, etc.) or colours used in polling graphs and are used as a visual differentiation between candidates.
Sources: Ville de Gatineau Archives

1999 Gatineau municipal election: Baie
Party	Candidate	Popular vote			Expenditures
Party	Candidate	Votes	%	±%	Expenditures
Independent	Paul Morin	1,057	42.69	–	none listed
Independent	Luc Courtemanche	590	23.83	-3.43	none listed
Independent	Pierre Lefebvre	564	22.78	–	none listed
Independent	André Mantha	265	10.70	–	none listed
Total valid votes		2,476	98.33		
Total rejected, unmarked and declined votes		42	1.67	-0.23	
Turnout		2,518	45.08	+3.08	
Eligible voters		5,586			
Note: Candidate campaign colours, unless a member of a party, are based on the prominent colour used in campaign items (signs, literature, etc.) or colours used in polling graphs and are used as a visual differentiation between candidates.
Sources: Ville de Gatineau Archives

1999 Gatineau municipal election: Pionniers
Party	Candidate	Popular vote			Expenditures
Party	Candidate	Votes	%	±%	Expenditures
Independent	Pierre Durand	1,345	50.44	–	none listed
Independent	Richard Migneault	1,119	49.56	–	none listed
Total valid votes		2,464	98.28		
Total rejected, unmarked and declined votes		43	1.72	–	
Turnout		2,507	50.35	–	
Eligible voters		4,979			
Note: Candidate campaign colours, unless a member of a party, are based on the prominent colour used in campaign items (signs, literature, etc.) or colours used in polling graphs and are used as a visual differentiation between candidates.
Sources: Ville de Gatineau Archives

1999 Gatineau municipal election: Moulin
Party	Candidate	Popular vote			Expenditures
Party	Candidate	Votes	%	±%	Expenditures
Independent	Aurèle Desjardins	1,070	47.58	–	none listed
Independent	Claude Touchette	689	30.64	–	none listed
Independent	Jocelyne Antoine	490	21.79	–	none listed
Total valid votes		2,249	98.25		
Total rejected, unmarked and declined votes		40	1.75	–	
Turnout		2,289	44.52	–	
Eligible voters		5,141			
Note: Candidate campaign colours, unless a member of a party, are based on the prominent colour used in campaign items (signs, literature, etc.) or colours used in polling graphs and are used as a visual differentiation between candidates.
Sources: Ville de Gatineau Archives

1999 Gatineau municipal election: Bellevue
Party	Candidate	Popular vote			Expenditures
Party	Candidate	Votes	%	±%	Expenditures
Independent	Richard Côté	2,129	69.92	-6.10	none listed
Independent	Margot Lajeunesse	916	30.08	–	none listed
Total valid votes		3,045	99.02		
Total rejected, unmarked and declined votes		30	0.98	-0.09	
Turnout		3,075	46.10	+3.26	
Eligible voters		6,671			
Note: Candidate campaign colours, unless a member of a party, are based on the prominent colour used in campaign items (signs, literature, etc.) or colours used in polling graphs and are used as a visual differentiation between candidates.
Sources: Ville de Gatineau Archives

1999 Gatineau municipal election: Belles-Rives
Party	Candidate	Popular vote			Expenditures
Party	Candidate	Votes	%	±%	Expenditures
Independent	Jean-Pierre Charette	Acclaimed	–	–	none listed
Total valid votes		–	–		
Total rejected, unmarked and declined votes		–	–	–	
Turnout		–	–	–	
Eligible voters		–			
Note: Candidate campaign colours, unless a member of a party, may be based on the prominent colour used in campaign items (signs, literature, etc.) or colours used in polling graphs and are used as a visual differentiation between candidates.
Sources: Ville de Gatineau Archives

1999 Gatineau municipal election: Rivière-Blanche
Party	Candidate	Popular vote			Expenditures
Party	Candidate	Votes	%	±%	Expenditures
Independent	Yvon Boucher	Acclaimed	–	–	none listed
Total valid votes		–	–		
Total rejected, unmarked and declined votes		–	–	–	
Turnout		–	–	–	
Eligible voters		–			
Note: Candidate campaign colours, unless a member of a party, may be based on the prominent colour used in campaign items (signs, literature, etc.) or colours used in polling graphs and are used as a visual differentiation between candidates.
Sources: Ville de Gatineau Archives

== Hull ==
Candidate	Votes	%
Yves Ducharme (X)	13,272	82.12
Denis Gagnon	1,372	8.49
Nicolas Martineau	778	4.81
Gheorge Irmia	740	4.58
