= Gaétan Cousineau =

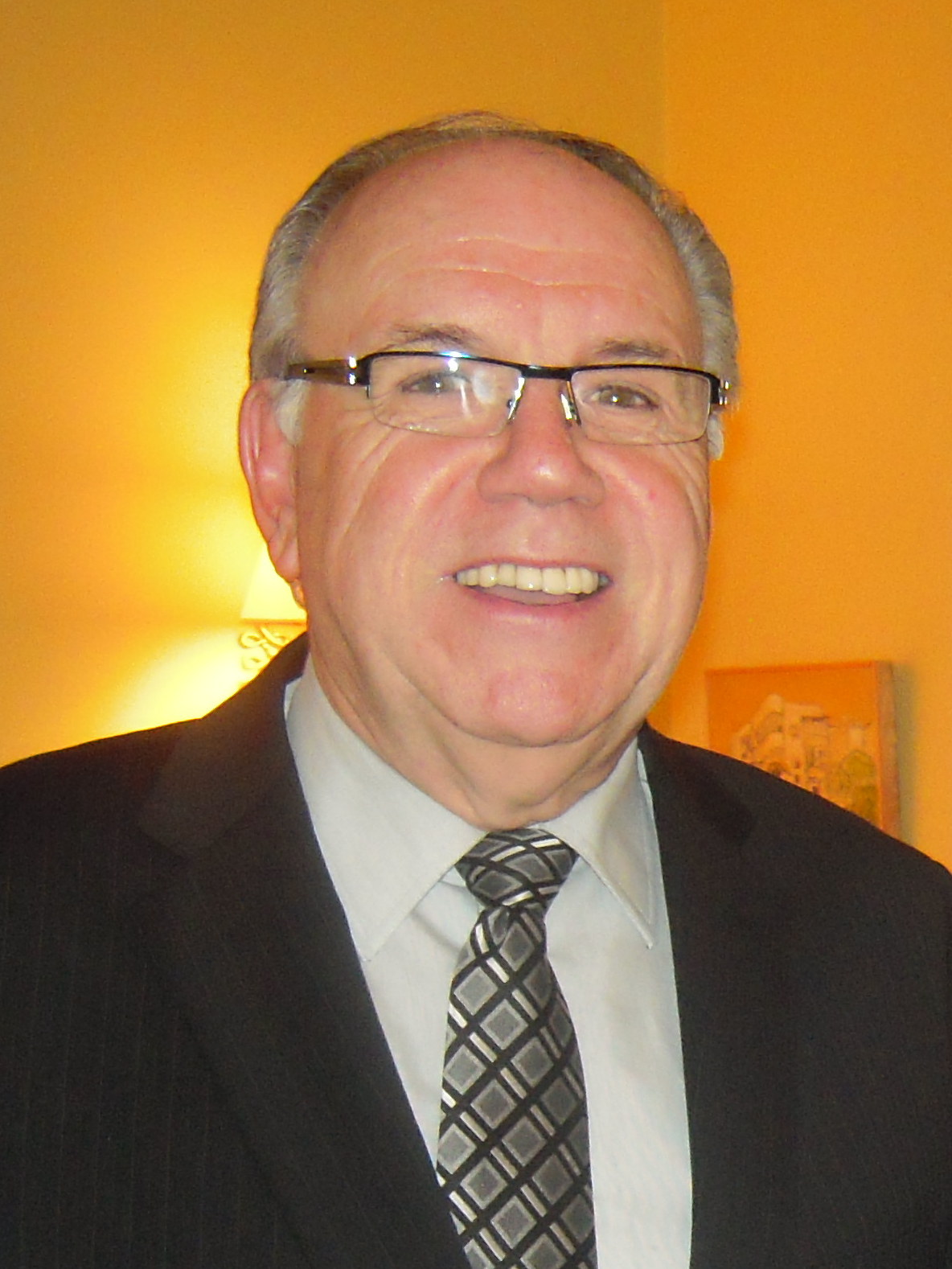
- Gaétan Cousineau (2012)

15th Mayor of Gatineau
- In office November 6, 1983 – June 5, 1988
- Preceded by: John-R. Luck
- Succeeded by: Robert Labine

Personal details
- Party: Équipe Mario Aubé

Gaétan Cousineau is an administrator and former politician in the Canadian province of Quebec. He was the mayor of Gatineau from 1983 to 1988 and is now president of the Commission des droits de la personne et des droits de la jeunesse (known in English as the Quebec Human Rights Commission).

== Early life and career ==
Cousineau has a diploma in Civil Law from the University of Ottawa and a Master of Public Administration degree from the École nationale d’administration publique. He ran a private law practice from 1968 to 1992. He was councillor for Gatineau's sixth ward from 1979 to 1983.

== Mayor of Gatineau ==
First term

Cousineau was elected as mayor in 1983, in a landslide victory over incumbent John Luck. He was also chosen as chair of the Outaouais Regional Council in 1987, defeating Aylmer mayor Constance Provost in a vote among council members.

Cousineau released a plan for a new municipal downtown core in 1985, highlights of which included a new city hall, cultural and sports centres, and a new CEGEP community centre. The city earmarked $6.6 million for a cultural centre two years later.

Also in 1985, Cousineau signed an accord with other Outaouais mayors to give each municipality control over its water system. The agreement followed years of jurisdictional conflict, during which time all municipalities had to have projects approved by the Outaouais Regional Council. Cousineau described the agreement as a compromise, without clear winners or losers. Gatineau ultimately received a water filtration plant during Cousineau's tenure as mayor.

He also expressed interest in a plan to have Canada's National Capital Region become the country's eleventh province. He did not support a proposal to merge Gatineau with Hull and Aylmer, and he criticized Hull mayor Michel Légère's plan for a fourth bridge from Ottawa over the Gatineau River.

Cousineau lobbied the government of Quebec for a community college campus during the mid-1980s. The project was approved in 1986.

There were rumours that Cousineau would seek the Liberal Party of Canada nomination for Gatineau in the 1988 election, although this came to nothing.

Second term

Cousineau was again challenged by John Luck in the 1987 municipal election. The two candidates disagreed on many substantive issues; in particular, Cousineau maintained his opposition to a merger with Hull and Aylmer, while Luck supported the plan. Cousineau ultimately won by 179 votes following a recount.

After the election, local activist Sylvain Simard charged that Cousineau should resign as mayor due to being in a conflict-of-interest over property he co-owned near the city's proposed downtown core. Cousineau responded that he was not in a conflict-of-interest and accused Simard of orchestrating a smear campaign. This notwithstanding, he resigned as mayor in February 1988, saying that he had run an honest administration but no longer wanted to be a target for partisan attacks. He stayed on until Robert Labine was elected in the by-election.

== Public administration ==
Cousineau worked for the Commission municipale du Québec from 1992 to 1998, when was appointed by the Canadian government to the Immigration and Refugee Board of Canada in Montreal. He was not re-appointed in November 2006, amid suggestions that new prime minister Stephen Harper was attempting to pack the board with its ideological allies.

After leaving the Immigration and Refugee board, Cousineau was appointed to a five-year term as president of the Commission des droits de la personne et des droits de la jeunesse, which began in September 2007. The following year, he argued that Quebec's proposed legislation on gender equity should formalize the province's commitment to economic and social rights. He also supported the principle of "reasonable accommodation" for minority ethnic and cultural groups in Quebec.

In March 2010, Cousineau issued a thirty-seven page document attacking the practice of racial profiling in Quebec. He subsequently presided over six days of public hearings on the subject in Montreal and Quebec City, and in August 2010 he accused the Montreal Police of "systematic" racial profiling against black men in the city. Cousineau has also accused Quebec medical schools of blocking advancement by qualified applicants trained in other countries.

== Electoral record ==
1987 Gatineau municipal election: Mayor of Gatineau
Candidate	Votes	%
Gaétan Cousineau (incumbent)	13,569	50.33
John Luck	13,390	49.67
Total valid votes	26,959	100

Source: "Cousineau wins, Luck continues to contest result" [mayoral recount], Ottawa Citizen, 16 November 1987, C1.

1983 Gatineau municipal election: Mayor of Gatineau
Candidate	Votes	%
Gaétan Cousineau	won by 6,811 votes	-
(x)John Luck	-	-

Source: Jack Aubry, "Ex-mayor's 'victory' short-lived," Ottawa Citizen, 2 November 1987, A1.
