= Guy Lacroix =

Canadian politician (1938–2014)

17th Mayor of Gatineau
- In office November 6, 1994 – November 7, 1999
- Preceded by: Robert Labine
- Succeeded by: Robert Labine

Gatineau City Councillor
- In office November 6, 1983 – November 1, 1987
- Preceded by: Honoré Séguin
- Succeeded by: Hélène Théorêt
- Constituency: Montée-Paiement District

Personal details
- Born: 1938 Gatineau, Quebec
- Died: August 27, 2014 (aged 75–76) Gatineau, Quebec
- Party: Independent
- Spouse(s): Thérèse Mailhot (m. 2001) Lise Bélec (m. 1957; died 1987)

Guy Lacroix (1938 – August 27, 2014) was a Canadian politician who served as the Mayor of Gatineau from 1994 to 1999 and as a city councillor for the Montée-Paiement District from 1983 to 1987. He died on August 27, 2014, from complications with cancer.

== Electoral record ==
1994 Gatineau mayoral by-election Resignation of Robert Labine
Party	Candidate	Popular vote			Expenditures
Party	Candidate	Votes	%	±%	Expenditures
Independent	Guy Lacroix	8,755	47.45	–	none listed
Independent	Serge Forget	6,160	33.39	–	none listed
Independent	Yvon Labrecque	2,429	13.17	–	none listed
Independent	Bruno Maranda	1,106	5.99	–	none listed
Total valid votes		18,450	98.36		
Total rejected, unmarked and declined votes		307	1.64	–	
Turnout		18,757	28.50	–	
Eligible voters		65,808			
Note: Candidate campaign colours, unless a member of a party, are based on the prominent colour used in campaign items (signs, literature, etc.) or colours used in polling graphs and are used as a visual differentiation between candidates.
Sources: Ville de Gatineau Archives
