= Roland Théorêt =

Canadian politician

Roland Théorêt (July 13, 1920 – September 28, 2013) was a notary and politician in Quebec. He served as mayor of Gatineau from 1957 to 1959 and from 1962 to 1965 and as a Union Nationale member of the National Assembly of Quebec representing Papineau from 1966 to 1970.

The son of Siméon Théorêt and Alma Théorêt, he was born in Île-Bizard and was educated there, at the Séminaire de Sainte-Thérèse, at the Collège Saint-Laurent and at the University of Montreal. He practised as a notary in Gatineau from 1946. Théorêt was a member of the Gatineau school board from 1951 to 1960. He served on the Gatineau council from 1952 to 1954, in 1956 and in 1957. Théorêt served as parliamentary assistant to the Revenue minister and as deputy speaker. He was defeated when he ran for reelection to the Quebec assembly in 1970.

In 1949, he married Lucille Landreville.

He died in Gatineau at the age of 93.

His daughter Hélène also served on the Gatineau council and his nephew Claude Charron served in the Quebec assembly.
