= Robert Labine =

Canadian politician (1940–2021)

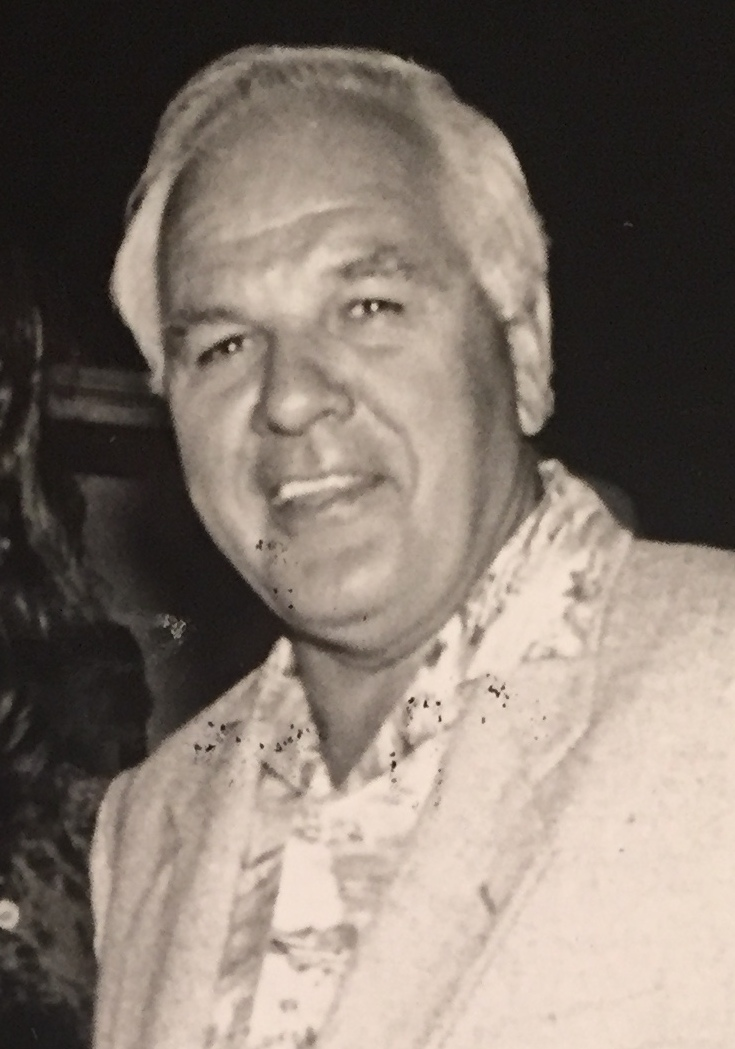
- Labine in 1992

16th and 18th Mayor of Gatineau
- In office November 7, 1999 – December 31, 2001
- Preceded by: Guy Lacroix
- Succeeded by: Yves Ducharme
- In office June 5, 1988 – August 14, 1994
- Preceded by: Gaétan Cousineau
- Succeeded by: Guy Lacroix

Personal details
- Born: December 23, 1940 Gatineau, Quebec
- Died: February 4, 2021 (aged 80) Gatineau, Quebec
- Spouse: Liette Tremblay

Robert "Bob" Labine (23 December 1940 – 4 February 2021) was a politician in Gatineau, Quebec. He was best known for being mayor of the former city of Gatineau between 1988 and 1994 and again between 1999 and 2001.

== Career ==
Labine was born in Gatineau, Quebec. He entered politics as a councillor of Gatineau in 1968 and remained at that position until 1978. He was elected mayor in 1988 and re-elected for a second mandate in 1991. Due to conflicts of interest, he resigned in 1994 before re-entering politics in 1999 after then-incumbent mayor Guy Lacroix stepped down after five years as mayor. Labine defeated future ADQ candidate Berthe Miron.

In 2001, Labine competed against then-Hull incumbent mayor Yves Ducharme and lost. After the election, he had little involvement in municipal politics.

During his first mandate, Labine (along with former Aylmer mayor Constance Provost) opposed a project of regrouping the cities of Hull, Aylmer and Gatineau in the early 1990s. The merger did occur in 2002 when a bill by the Parti Québécois forced the merger of those three municipalities along with Buckingham and Masson-Angers. In 2000, Labine mentioned that a merger would not save money.

During his tenure as mayor, Labine was in favour of building a new sports complex in the Gatineau sector. However, the building was built only a decade later, in 2010, due to negotiations with other levels of governments regarding funding. The mayor of the new city of Gatineau, Marc Bureau, had committed to having this project realized. Labine was also in favour of building an additional bridge to Ottawa in the east end of the metropolitan area, via Kettle Island towards the Aviation Parkway, a controversial project that was opposed by many Ottawa residents.

After his political career, Labine led a successful bid for the city of Gatineau to obtain the 2010 Quebec Summer Games in which it defeated four other bids coming from Vaudreuil-Dorion, Shawinigan, Rivière-du-Loup and Charlevoix.

== Personal life ==
Labine was married and had two children. He died in the Hull sector of Gatineau on 4 February 2021, aged 80.

== Electoral record ==
2001 Gatineau municipal election: Mayor
Party	Candidate	Popular vote			Expenditures
Party	Candidate	Votes	%	±%	Expenditures
Independent	Yves Ducharme	47,975	54.39	–	none listed
Independent	Robert Labine	40,227	45.61	-2.71 (Note: The difference is taken from the result of the 1999 Gatineau mayoral election, which was before amalgamation.)	none listed
Total valid votes		88,202	98.65		
Total rejected, unmarked and declined votes		1,203	1.35	-0.07	
Turnout		89,405	53.76	+7.11	
Eligible voters		166,292			
Note: Candidate campaign colours, unless a member of a party, are based on the prominent colour used in campaign items (signs, literature, etc.) or colours used in polling graphs and are used as a visual differentiation between candidates.
Sources: Office of the City Clerk of Gatineau

1999 Gatineau municipal election: Mayor
Party	Candidate	Popular vote			Expenditures
Party	Candidate	Votes	%	±%	Expenditures
Independent	Robert Labine	15,557	48.32	–	none listed
Independent	Berthe Miron	13,824	42.94	–	none listed
Independent	Rosaire Cauchon	2,816	8.75	–	none listed
Total valid votes		32,197	98.58		
Total rejected, unmarked and declined votes		464	1.42	+0.18	
Turnout		32,611	45.35	+0.28	
Eligible voters		72,020			
Note: Candidate campaign colours, unless a member of a party, are based on the prominent colour used in campaign items (signs, literature, etc.) or colours used in polling graphs and are used as a visual differentiation between candidates.
Sources: Ville de Gatineau Archives and Ottawa Citizen

1988 Gatineau mayoral by-election Resignation of Gaétan Cousineau
Party	Candidate	Popular vote			Expenditures
Party	Candidate	Votes	%	±%	Expenditures
Independent	Robert Labine	9,150	37.98	–	none listed
Independent	Sylvain Simard	8,976	37.26	–	none listed
Independent	Jean Deschênes	4,947	20.53	–	none listed
Independent	Hubert Leroux	1,018	4.23	–	none listed
Total valid votes		24,091	99.10		
Total rejected, unmarked and declined votes		219	0.90	–	
Turnout		24,310	44.63	–	
Eligible voters		54,470			
Note: Candidate campaign colours, unless a member of a party, are based on the prominent colour used in campaign items (signs, literature, etc.) or colours used in polling graphs and are used as a visual differentiation between candidates.
Sources: Ville de Gatineau Archives and Ottawa Citizen

See the 1987 Gatineau municipal election page for details on Deschênes and Leroux.
Source: David Gamble, "Labine wins tight race for mayor in Gatineau," Ottawa Citizen, 6 June 1988, A1.
