= 1998 Quebec municipal elections =

More than two hundred and forty municipalities in the Canadian province of Quebec held mayoral and council elections on November 1, 1998.

== Results ==
=== Montreal ===
1998 Montreal municipal election: Mayor of Montreal
Party	Candidate	Votes	%
Vision Montreal	(x)Pierre Bourque	141,814	45.52
New Montreal	Jacques Duchesneau	84,289	27.05
Montreal Citizens' Movement	Michel Prescott	46,298	14.86
Team Montreal	Jean Doré	32,167	10.32
Montreal 2000	Michel Bédard	3,004	0.96
Independent	Patricia Métivier	2,224	0.71
Independent	Michel Dugré	989	0.32
Independent	Laurent Alie	784	0.25
Total valid votes		311,569	100
Source: Official Results, City of Montreal

=== Montréal-Nord ===
1998 Montreal North municipal election: Mayor of Montreal North
Candidate	Votes	%
(x)Yves Ryan	acclaimed	.
Source: "Quebec election results stay true to polls," Montreal Gazette, 3 November 1998, A8.

=== Sherbrooke ===
1998 Sherbrooke election, Mayor of Sherbrooke
Candidate	Total votes	% of total votes
(incumbent)Jean Perreault		c. 70

=== Bromont ===
1998 Bromont election, Mayor of Bromont
Candidate	Total votes	% of total votes
Pauline Quinlan	not listed	c. 73
(incumbent)Robert Desourdy		

- Robert Desourdy is the son of Rolland Desourdy, who served as mayor of Cowansville for nineteen years and founded Bromont as a "model town" in the early 1960s. Rolland's brother, Germain Desourdy, also served a mayor Bromont in the 1970s. In the 1980s, the younger Desourdy oversaw family interests such as a ski resort and golf course. He served as mayor of Bromont from 1996 until 1998, when he was defeated by Pauline Quinlan. He sought to return to council in a May 2001 by-election, but was defeated. Desourdy later announced that he would seek the mayoralty again in 2005, but he ultimately chose not to file his nomination papers.

=== Cowansville ===
1998 Cowansville election, Mayor of Cowansville
Candidate	Total votes	% of total votes
Arthur Fauteux		c. 60%
(incumbent)Jacques Charbonneau		c. 40%

- Jacques Charbonneau served as mayor of Cowansville from 1986 until 1998, when he lost to Arthur Fauteux. He also sought the Progressive Conservative Party of Canada nomination for Brome—Missisquoi prior to the 1993 federal election, without success. After leaving the mayoralty, he became a board member of Memphremagog Conservation Incorporated. Charbonneau is the father of Bromont politician Patrick Charbonneau and football player Steve Charbonneau.

=== Magog ===
1998 Magog election, Mayor of Magog
Candidate	Total votes	% of total votes
Marc Poulin	elected	
Noël Lacasse	defeated	

Newspaper coverage indicates that the contest was close, with Poulin winning by about one hundred votes.

Source for election results: "Quebec election results stay true to polls," Montreal Gazette, 3 November 1998, A8.
