= 2009 Potton municipal election =

The 2009 Potton municipal election took place on November 1, 2009, to elect a mayor and councillors in Potton, Quebec.

== Results ==
2009 Potton election, Mayor of Potton
Candidate	Total votes	% of total votes
Jacques Marcoux	746	69.92
Louis Veillon	250	23.43
Damien Pouliot	71	6.65
Total valid votes	1,067	100.00

- Jacques Marcoux was born to Canadian parents in Greenville, Maine, in 1945 and moved to Canada with his family two years later. He worked for many years as a teacher, civil servant, and small business owner. He was a councillor in Potton from 1981 to 1985 and was elected as the community's mayor over his cousin, incumbent André Marcoux, in 1989. He served for one term before being defeated in a 1993 election rematch. In 1988, he helped defeat a municipal by-law that would have permitted three new developments in the town; Marcoux said that he wanted to preserve Potton's rural character. He later served as president of the board of directors for the Centre de Sante Memphremagog in the early 2000s. In 2008, he undertook an eleven thousand kilometre bicycle journey in the United States and Canada to raise thirty-six thousand dollars for community groups in Mansonville. When he launched his mayoral campaign in 2009, he was sixty-three years old and described himself as retired. One of his first initiatives after winning the election was to help pass an initiative to bring high-speed internet to the entire community. By virtue of being the mayor of Potton, Marcoux also serves on the Memphrémagog Regional County Municipality. In March 2010, he announced an increase in the region's rural transportation services. In January 2011, he became chair of the region's local development centre.
- Louis Veillon has operated La Vieille Buche Pub in Mansonville. He served on the Potton municipal council from 1993 to 1997 and again from 2001 to 2009; he first sought election as mayor in 1997 and lost to André Marcoux. Veillon was sixty years old in 2009 and listed himself as retired.

2009 Potton election, Councillor, Seat One
Candidate	Total votes	% of total votes
Michel Cyr	470	45.32
Paul St. Onge	290	27.97
Shawn Pouliot	277	26.71
Total valid votes	1,037	100.00

2009 Potton election, Councillor, Seat Two
Candidate	Total votes	% of total votes
Diane Rypinski Marcoux	653	62.07
Hans Walser	399	37.93
Total valid votes	1,052	100.00

2009 Potton election, Councillor, Seat Three
Candidate	Total votes	% of total votes
Michel Daigneault	692	67.32
Christine Larin	336	32.68
Total valid votes	1,028	100.00

2009 Potton election, Councillor, Seat Four
Candidate	Total votes	% of total votes
(incumbent)Michael Head	527	51.31
Jason Ball	500	48.69
Total valid votes	1,027	100.00

2009 Potton election, Councillor, Seat Five
Candidate	Total votes	% of total votes
Jacques Hébert	513	50.15
Alex Béchard	510	49.85
Total valid votes	1,023	100.00

2009 Potton election, Councillor, Seat Six
Candidate	Total votes	% of total votes
(incumbent)Christian Rodrigue	accl.	.

Source: Résultats 2009, Affairs municipales, Régions, et Occupations du territoire.
