= 2001 Potton municipal election =

The 2001 Potton municipal election took place on November 4, 2001, to elect a mayor and councillors in Potton, Quebec.

== Results ==
2001 Potton municipal election: Mayor of Potton
Candidate	Votes	%
Claude Laplume	625	69.60
(x)André Marcoux	273	30.40
Total valid votes	898	100.00

- André Marcoux was the mayor of Potton from 1977 to 1989 and again from 1993 to 2001. He lost to his cousin Jacques Marcoux in the 1989 municipal election, but regained the mayoralty four years later. In 2000, he promoted a plan for a new community centre that he said could be accomplished with assistance from the federal and provincial governments and without a tax increase. The federal and provincial governments declined to fund the centre in 2002, following Marcoux's defeat. He is not to be confused with another André Marcoux who has served as mayor of Donnacona.

2001 Potton election, Councillor, Seat One
Candidate	Total votes	% of total votes
Lorna Aiken-Lamothe	526	59.10
Ross Taylor	281	31.57
Damien Pouliot	83	9.33
Total valid votes	890	100.00

2001 Potton election, Councillor, Seat Two
Candidate	Total votes	% of total votes
Barbara Koch	457	51.46
(incumbent)Ernest Tomuschat	248	27.93
John Lutzman	183	20.61
Total valid votes	888	100.00

2001 Potton municipal election: Councillor, Seat Three
Candidate	Votes	%
Louis Veillon	526	59.57
Heather Keith-Ryan	357	40.43
Total Valid Votes	883	100

2001 Potton election, Councillor, Seat Four
Candidate	Total votes	% of total votes
Edward Mierzwinski	561	63.61
Debra Harding	321	36.39
Total valid votes	882	100.00

2001 Potton election, Councillor, Seat Five
Candidate	Total votes	% of total votes
Marcel Turner	634	71.40
(incumbent)Pierre Pouliot	254	28.60
Total valid votes	888	100.00

2001 Potton election, Councillor, Seat Six
Candidate	Total votes	% of total votes
Christian Rodrigue	accl.	.

Source: "Election 2001 Sherbrooke & Townships," Sherbrooke Record, 6 November 2001, p. 5.
