= 1985 Quebec municipal elections =

Elections in Quebec, Canada

Several municipalities in the Canadian province of Quebec held municipal elections to elect mayors and councillors on November 3, 1985.

Municipal elections were not held in Montreal, Quebec's largest city, in this electoral cycle. The previous municipal election in Montreal took place in 1982 and the next was scheduled for 1986.

== Results (incomplete) ==
=== Verdun ===
Former Liberal Party of Canada Member of Parliament (MP) Raymond Savard was elected to his first term as mayor in the on-island Montreal suburb of Verdun, narrowly defeating Georges Bossé in a crowded field. Bossé's Municipal Action Party won six seats on council, as opposed to only four for Savard's Verdun Citizens' Movement. Former Liberal cabinet minister Bryce Mackasey was defeated in his bid for a council seat.

One of the leading issues in this election was the proposed annexation of Verdun into the city of Montreal. The Verdun Unity Party supported this position and was rejected at the polls; all of the party's candidates, including three incumbent councillors, were defeated. Incumbent councillor Robert Filiatraut was re-elected as a candidate of the Verdun Anti-Annexation Party. Nuns' Island (Division 1) was an outlier in this election, with a pro-annexation independent candidate winning an overwhelming victory.

Party colours in the results listed below have been randomly chosen and do not indicate affiliation with or resemblance to any municipal, provincial, or federal party.

Electoral District	Position	Total valid votes	Candidates					
Electoral District	Position	Total valid votes	Parti d'action municipale (Municipal Action Party)	Parti de l'Unité de Verdun (Verdun Unity Party)	Regroupement des Citoyens de Verdun (Verdun Citizens' Movement)	Parti contre l'annexion de Verdun (Verdun Anti-Annexation Party)	Parti civique de Verdun (Verdun Civic Party)	Independents
	Mayor	24,522	Georges Bossé; 7,987 (32.57%)	Robert Liboiron; 4,886 (19.92%)	Raymond Savard; 8,232 (33.57%)	Maurice Trudeau; 2,372 (9.67%)	Robert Mailhot; 337 (1.37%)	Eddy Vigneau; 708 (2.89%)
District 1	City councillor	2,142			André Lecocq; 16 (0.75%)	Richard Lamontagne; 15 (0.70%)	Jean-Pierre Mailhot; 10 (0.47%)	Arthur Benarroch; 1,730 (80.77%); Danielle D. Hébert; 189 (8.82%); André Claude Gagnier; 182 (8.50%)
District 2	City councillor	1,992	Jacques Lauzon; 753 (37.80%)	Jean-Paul Leblanc; 414 (20.78%)	Claudette Gauthier; 210 (10.54%)	Réjean Lacoste (incumbent); 615 (30.87%)		
District 3	City councillor	1,956	Raymond Burnett; 490 (25.05%)	Pierre Paquette; 363 (18.56%)	Frank Renzo; 401 (20.50%)	Robert Filiatraut (incumbent); 627 (32.06%)		Daniel Bertrand; 75 (3.83%)
District 4	City councillor	2,054	Jocelyn Beauvais; 745 (36.27%)	Nicole Brault-Greco; 437 (21.28%)	Paul Beaupré; 430 (20.93%)	Alain Tassé; 411 (20.01%)	Gilbert Léger; 31 (1.51%)	
District 5	City councillor	1,879	Louis Leblanc; 695 (36.99%)	Jean-Paul Paquette (incumbent); 305 (16.23%)	Richard St-Amour; 331 (17.62%)	Marcel Bourassa; 409 (21.77%)	Mary MacNaughton; 33 (1.76%)	Marc Vaillancourt; 106 (5.64%)
District 6	City councillor	1,985	Laurent Dugas; 734 (36.98%)	Yvon Bernier (incumbent); 402 (20.25%)	Jules Provost; 433 (21.81%)	Réal Lapierre; 372 (18.74%)	Carmen Goedike; 44 (2.22%)	
District 7	City councillor	2,211	Claude Ravary; 850 (38.44%)	Jean-Paul Belisle (incumbent); 573 (25.92%)	Johanne Côté; 637 (28.81%)	Réjean Dugas; 125 (5.65%)	Lucien Richard; 26 (1.18%)	
District 8	City councillor	1,603	Jeannine Trainor; 494 (30.82%)	Jean-Paul Richard; 287 (17.91%)	Elliot Goldsborough; 564 (35.18%)	Charles Sylvestre; 146 (9.11%)	Jean Letourneau; 112 (6.99%)	
District 9	City councillor	2,028	Marcel H. Girard; 519 (25.59%)	Pauline Charpentier; 302 (14.89%)	Jocelyn Théroux-Méager; 943 (46.50%)	Geneviève Dugas; 177 (8.73%)	Eric Hill; 87 (4.29%)	
District 10	City councillor	2,210	Robert Noël DeTilly; 675 (30.54%)	Marcel Brisebois; 295 (13.35%)	Maurice Couturier; 724 (32.76%)	Bryce Mackasey; 462 (20.90%)		Bernard Deschamps; 54 (2.44%)
District 11	City councillor	2,511	Suzanne Dunne; 1.093 (43.53%)	Ralph Damato; 228 (9.08%)	Robert Blanchette; 1,010 (40.22%)	Odette Gloutnay; 162 (6.45%)	Manon Mosseau; 18 (0.72%)	
District 12	City councillor	1,876	Jacqueline Quinn; 518 (27.61%)	Gerald Patrick O'Reilly; 380 (20.26%)	John Gallagher; 786 (41.90%)	Richard Archambault; 129 (6.88%)		Arthur Wilsher; 63 (3.36%)

Source: "Final results for Verdun, Hudson, Montreal East," Montreal Gazette, 5 November 1985, A6.
