= Sir George Dashwood, 6th Baronet =

English landowner

Captain Sir George Dashwood Bt DL JP

High Sheriff of Oxfordshire
- In office 1903–1904
- Preceded by: Charles Cottrell-Dormer
- Succeeded by: James Walker Larnach

Personal details
- Born: George John Egerton Dashwood; 12 September 1851
- Died: 1 September 1933 (aged 81) Oxford
- Spouse: Lady Mary Margaret Seymour (m. 1875)
- Relations: Rosamund Dashwood (granddaughter)
- Children: 10

Sir George John Egerton Dashwood, 6th Baronet, DL, JP (12 September 1851 – 1 September 1933), of Kirtlington Park, was an English landowner.

== Early life ==
Dashwood was born on 12 September 1851. He was the eldest son of Sir Henry Dashwood, 5th Baronet (1816–1889), and the former Sophia Drinkwater (1818–1894). His sister, Ellen Louisa Dashwood, married Hon. Conrad Adderley Dillon (second son of Arthur Dillon, 16th Viscount Dillon).

His paternal grandparents were Sir George Dashwood, 4th Baronet (MP for Truro), and the former Marianne Sarah Rowley (eldest daughter of Sir William Rowley, 2nd Baronet). His maternal grandparents were Ellen (née Hyde) Drinkwater (daughter of Nathan Hyde, of Ardwick) and John Drinkwater, of Sherborne.

== Career ==
On 25 January 1889, he succeeded to the baronetcy upon the death of his father. In 1909, he sold the family estate, Kirtlington Park, to the Earl of Leven and Melville. The house had been built at the beginning of the 18th century and contained notable examples of Grinling Gibbons's carving. He was Deputy Lieutenant and a Justice of the Peace of Oxfordshire.

Dashwood was a Captain in the Scots Fusilier Guards and later served in the 4th (Oxford Militia) Battalion, Oxfordshire Light Infantry with the honorary rank of Major. Like his father before him, he served as High Sheriff of Oxfordshire from 1903 to 1904.

Dashwood was closely associated with the YMCA and the Red Triangle Federation, having been president of both organisations.

== Personal life ==
On 12 August 1875, he was married to Lady Mary Margaret Seymour (1855–1948), the sixth daughter of Lord Chamberlain of the Household Francis Seymour, 5th Marquess of Hertford and the former Lady Emily Murray (herself the sixth daughter of David Murray, 3rd Earl of Mansfield). Together, they were the parents of eleven children, three of whom were killed during World War I:

- Sir Robert Henry Seymour Dashwood, 7th Baronet (1876–1947), who married Margaret Helen Henry, only daughter of Lt Gen. George Henry, in 1903.
- Emily Sophia Dashwood (1878–1962), who married Alfred Rendell Street, a son of John Rendell Street, of Sydney, Australia, in 1913.
- Ernest George Dashwood (1880–1915), a Captain who was killed in action during World War I.
- Dorothy Constance Dashwood (1881–1950), who died unmarried.
- Arthur Paul Dashwood (1882–1964), a Major who married Edmée Elizabeth Monica de la Pasture, a novelist who published as E.M. Delafield, who was the eldest daughter of Count Henry Ducarel de la Pasture and Mrs Henry de la Pasture (also a well known novelist), in 1919.
- Wilfred James Dashwood (1883–1917), a Lieutenant in the Grenadier Guards who died of wounds received in action during World War I.
- Margaret Frances Dashwood (1885–1959), who married Capt. Ronald Robert Henderson MP, of Studley Priory, in 1909.
- Lionel Albert Dashwood (1887–1915), a 2nd Lieutenant who was killed in action during World War I.
- Henry Godfrey Dashwood (1889–1970), who married Helen Gladys Cartmell, only child of Rev. James William Cartmell, Fellow of Christ's College, Cambridge, in 1918. After her death in 1946, he married Dora Holmes, youngest daughter of Lt. Col. Henry Holmes, in 1947.
- Muriel Helen Dashwood (1892–1983), who died unmarried.
- Edward John Dashwood (1902–1925), a Flying officer in the Royal Air Force who was killed in action on the North-West Frontier Province.

Sir George died at his home in Oxford on 1 September 1933. He was succeeded in the baronetcy by his eldest son, Robert. His funeral was held at Ristlington parish church, near Oxford, and led by the Vicar and the Rev. Lord Victor Seymour, his brother-in-law. His widow, Lady Dashwood, died on 29 December 1948.

Baronetage of England
Preceded by Henry William Dashwood	Baronet (of Kirtlington); 1889–1933	Succeeded by Robert Henry Seymour Dashwood
