= E. M. Delafield =

English author (1890–1943)

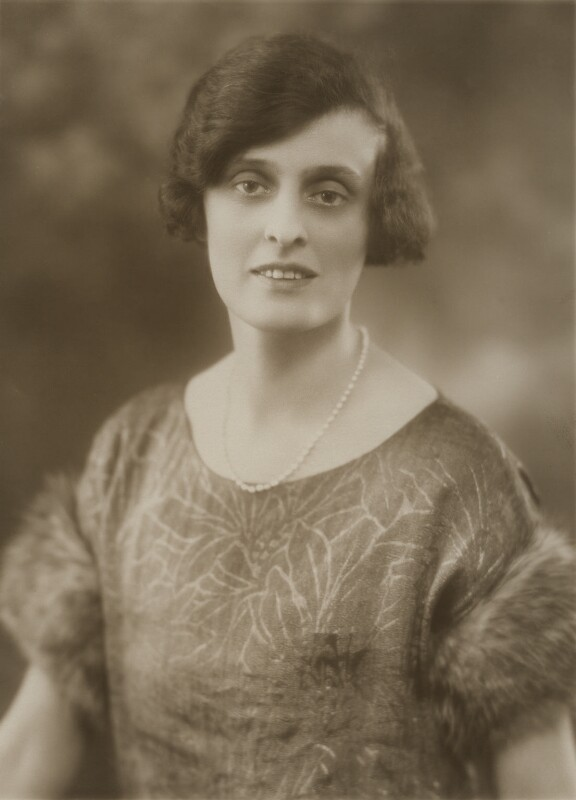
- Delafield in 1925
- Born: Edmée Elizabeth Monica de la Pasture; 9 June 1890; Hove, Sussex, England
- Died: 2 December 1943 (aged 53)
- Resting place: Kentisbeare, Devon, England
- Occupation: Novelist
- Spouse: Arthur Paul Dashwood (m. 1919)
- Children: Lionel Dashwood; Rosamund Dashwood
- Parents: Count Henry Philip Ducarel de La Pasture (father); Mrs Henry de la Pasture (mother); Sir Hugh Charles Clifford (step-father)
- Writing career
- Notable work: Diary of a Provincial Lady

Edmée Elizabeth Monica Dashwood, née de la Pasture (9 June 1890 – 2 December 1943), commonly known as E. M. Delafield, was a prolific English author. She wrote novels, short stories, essays, and plays, but is now best known for her largely autobiographical Diary of a Provincial Lady, the fictional journal of an upper-middle-class Englishwoman in a Devon village in the 1930s. Delafield is considered a master of the comedy of manners.

== Life ==
Delafield was born in Hove, Sussex. She was the elder daughter of Count Henry Philip Ducarel de la Pasture, of Llandogo Priory, Monmouthshire, and Elizabeth Lydia Rosabelle Bonham, daughter of Edward William Bonham, who as Mrs Henry de la Pasture was also a well-known novelist. The pen-name Delafield adopted later was a thin disguise of "de la Pasture," suggested by her sister, Yoé. The de la Pasture family was bilingual, and young Elizabeth was educated until age ten by a series of French governesses. She then attended several convent schools until 1907, when she was seventeen. Count Henry died suddenly of a heart attack the next year, when Delafield was entering the marriage market. She was lively and charming but shy, so she "failed" as a debutante. Her mother, meanwhile, found another husband for herself: Sir Hugh Clifford GCMG, who governed the colonies of the Gold Coast (1912–19), Nigeria (1919–25), Ceylon (1925–27), and the Malay States. Sir Hugh is said to have been the inspiration for a character in Noel Coward's Mad Dogs and Englishmen.

In 1911, Delafield chose to pursue a religious life. She was accepted as a postulant by a French religious order established in Belgium. Her account of the experience, The Brides of Heaven, was written in 1931 and eventually published in her biography. "The motives which led me, as soon as I was 21, to enter a French Religious Order are worthy of little discussion, and less respect," she begins. These motives appear to have included receiving only one marriage offer as a debutante. She recounts being told by the Superior that if a doctor advised a surgical operation, "your Superiors will decide whether your life is of sufficient value to the community to justify the expense. If it is not, you will either get better without the operation or die. In either case you will be doing the will of God, and nothing else matters." Delafield finally left the convent when she learned that Yoé was planning to join another enclosed order: "The thought of the utter and complete earthly separation that must necessarily take place between us was more than I could bear."

After the outbreak of World War I, she worked as a nurse in a Voluntary Aid Detachment in Exeter, under the command of Georgiana Buller. Delafield's first novel, Zella Sees Herself, was published in 1917, the same year in which she decided to use the first name Edmée. In the last two years of the war, she worked for the Ministry of National Service in Bristol and published two more novels. Delafield continued to publish one or two novels every year until nearly the end of her life.

On July 17, 1919, Delafield married Colonel Arthur Paul Dashwood, OBE, a younger son of Sir George Dashwood, 6th Baronet and Lady Mary Seymour, the youngest daughter of Francis Seymour, 5th Marquess of Hertford). Dashwood was an engineer who had built the massive docks at Hong Kong Harbour. After two years of living with him in the Malay States, Delafield insisted on coming back to England, and they subsequently lived in Croyle, an old house in Kentisbeare, Devon, on the Bradfield estate, where Dashwood became the land agent. They had two children, Lionel and Rosamund. At the initial meeting of the Kentisbeare Women's Institute in 1924, Delafield was unanimously elected president and remained in that office until she died. She also served as a Justice of the Peace from 1925, when she was appointed the first woman magistrate on the local Cullompton Bench.

Delafield's son, Lionel, died in late 1940 while serving in the army, some suggest by his own hand, a tragedy from which she never recovered. Her own health suffered a progressive decline, which necessitated a colostomy and many visits to a neurologist. Three years later, on December 2, 1943, Delafield died after collapsing while lecturing in Oxford. She was buried under her favourite yew tree in the Kentisbeare churchyard, near her son. Her mother survived her and died five years later. Her daughter, Rosamund Dashwood, emigrated to Canada.

== Diary of a Provincial Lady ==
When the editor of Time and Tide "wanted some light 'middles', preferably in serial form, Delafield promised to submit some pieces." She later said: "The idea had come into my mind of writing, in the first-person singular, a perfectly straightforward account of the many disconcerting facets presented by everyday life to the average woman." It was thus, in 1930, that her most popular and enduring work, Diary of a Provincial Lady, was written. This largely autobiographical novel substituted the names of "Robin" and "Vicky" for her own children. The book has never been out of print and inspired several sequels chronicling later portions of Delafield's life: The Provincial Lady Goes Further, The Provincial Lady in America, and The Provincial Lady in War-Time.

In 1961, Delafield's daughter, Rosamund Dashwood, published Provincial Daughter, a semi-autobiographical account of her own experiences of domesticated life in the 1950s.

== Reception ==
Delafield was an author of middlebrow fiction in her day, along with such writers as Angela Thirkell and Agatha Christie. Of her novels, only the Provincial Lady series achieved wide commercial success (The Diary of a Provincial Lady was a Book Society Book of the Month in December 1930). However, Delafield's contributions to magazines such as Time and Tide and Punch, which published over four hundred of her pieces, gained her great fame in the United Kingdom. She also was popular in the United States and went on two successful speaking tours there in the 1930s.

Delafield's status in Britain was such that in the early days of World War II the BBC asked her to broadcast a reassuring series called Home Is Like That, and the future Prime Minister Harold Macmillan persuaded her to bring her beloved diarist out of retirement for a series later published as The Provincial Lady in War-Time. Delafield's status in England was also reflected in the BBC's decision to announce her death on its Six O'Clock News. Punch commented: "Many Punch readers have realized since her death that it was the article by E. M. Delafield that instinctively they read first each week…and they didn't realize till now, when those articles have ceased, what a blank their absence would leave."

The critic Rachel Ferguson suggested that Delafield wrote too much and that her work was uneven, though Ferguson considered The Way Things Are a "completely perfect novel," suggesting in 1939 that Delafield's "humour and super-sensitive observation should make of her one of the best and most significant writers we possess, a comforting and timeless writer whose comments will delight a hundred years hence." The Times opined that Delafield was a "genuine if modest genius" of her craft. Cynthia Zarin credits Delafield with creating the modern humorous diary. J. B. Priestley called her the equal of the best English female humorists, including Jane Austen, and allocated five pages to her in English Humor (1976). The critic Henry Canby attributed her lack of "resounding" critical success to her unpretentiousness, saying she was "one, who, like Jane Austen, seems to write easily on her lap, while others talk and clamor about her." English literature professor Faye Hammill said of the Provincial Lady that "enormous skill, subtlety, and power of selection have gone to create this seemingly mild and commonplace character." Maurice McCullen says that Delafield's "strength as a humorist argues most strongly for a place in English literature."

== Books ==
Delafield's writings are in the public domain. Project Gutenberg has transcribed most of her early novels and several titles are available at the Internet Archive.

=== The Provincial Lady series ===
- Diary of a Provincial Lady (1930)
- The Provincial Lady Goes Further (1932) — published in America as The Provincial Lady in London
- The Provincial Lady in America (1934)
- The Provincial Lady in War-Time (1940)

=== Other novels ===
- Zella Sees Herself (1917)
- The War-Workers (1918)
- The Pelicans (1918)
- Consequences (1919)
- Tension (1920)
- The Heel of Achilles (1920)
- Humbug (1921)
- The Optimist (1922)
- A Reversion to Type (1923)
- Messalina of the Suburbs (1924) — based on the Edith Thompson and Frederick Bywaters murder case of 1922
- Mrs Harter (1924)
- The Chip and the Block (1925)
- Jill (1926)
- The Way Things Are (1927)
- The Suburban Young Man (1928)
- What Is Love? (1928) — published in America as First Love
- Turn Back the Leaves (1930)
- Challenge to Clarissa (1931) — published in America as House Party
- Thank Heaven Fasting (1932)
- Gay Life (1933)
- The Bazalgettes (1936) — a spoof Victorian novel, originally published anonymously
- "Faster! Faster!" (1936)
- Nothing Is Safe (1937)
- Three Marriages (1938) — novellas, published in America as When Women Love
- No One Now Will Know (1941)
- Late and Soon (1943)

=== Short stories and sketches ===
- The Entertainment (1927) — short story collection
- Women Are Like That (1929) — short story collection
- General Impressions (1933) — sketches originally published in Time and Tide
- As Others Hear Us: A Miscellany (1937) — sketches originally published in Punch and Time and Tide
- Love Has No Resurrection (1939) — short story collection

=== Drama ===
- To See Ourselves (1930)
- The Glass Wall (1932)
- Crime on the Hill (1933) — a screenplay written with Vera Allinson
- The Little Boy (1934) — a radio play
- Moonlight Sonata (1938) — a screenplay written with Edward Knoblock

=== Non-fiction ===
- The Brontës: Their Lives Recorded by Their Contemporaries (1935)
- Ladies and Gentlemen in Victorian Fiction (1937)
- Straw Without Bricks: I Visit Soviet Russia (1937) — published in America as I Visit the Soviets; later republished as The Provincial Lady in Russia, although it does not feature the Provincial Lady
