= Free Money (film) =

- Directed by: Yves Simoneau
- Written by: Anthony Peck; Joseph Brutsman
- Produced by: Nicolas Clermont
- Starring: Marlon Brando; Charlie Sheen; Donald Sutherland; Martin Sheen; Thomas Haden Church; Mira Sorvino
- Cinematography: David Franco
- Edited by: Yves Langlois
- Music by: Mark Isham
- Distributed by: MDP Worldwide
- Release date: December 3, 1998 (Singapore)
- Running time: 91 minutes
- Country: Canada
- Language: English
- Budget: $22 million

Free Money (also known as Double Nickels) is a 1998 Canadian black comedy film directed by Yves Simoneau, produced by Nicolas Clermont and written by Anthony Peck and Joseph Brutsman. The film stars Marlon Brando, Charlie Sheen, Donald Sutherland, Martin Sheen, Thomas Haden Church and Mira Sorvino.

The film focuses on a prison warden who illegally executes prisoners. When one of his sons-in-law is arrested and imprisoned for a failed train robbery, the warden plans to kill him. But an FBI Agent interferes with his plans.

== Plot ==
Sven "The Swede" Sorenson is a malicious warden of the county, illegally executing some of his worst prisoners. Everybody in town hates and is scared of him, except his twin daughters. Swede's twins tell their father they are pregnant, lying in order to manipulate him into forcing their dim boyfriends, Bud Dyerson and Larry, into shotgun marriages.

Sven also turns his sons-in-law into slave laborers, so Bud hatches an escape plan to rob a train carrying old bills to the mint for burning. Larry is his reluctant accomplice. When Bud is captured, he is railroaded into Swede's small-town jail by the Judge and Swede. His death looks certain, until he hatches yet another plan that requires Larry's help. Meanwhile, the Judge's daughter and FBI Agent Karen Polarski, come to his aid.

== Cast ==
- Marlon Brando as Warden Sven 'The Swede' Sorenson
- Charlie Sheen as Bud Dyerson
- Donald Sutherland as Judge Rolf Rausenberger
- Martin Sheen as New Warden
- Thomas Haden Church as Larry
- Mira Sorvino as Karen Polarski
- David Arquette as Ned Jebee
- Holly L. Watson as Liv
- Christin Watson as Inga

== Production ==
In spite of the high-profile cast, the movie was produced independently from Hollywood studios, by the Canadian studio Filmline. Charlie Sheen's independent production company Sheen/Michaels Entertainment (founded with Poison singer Brett Michaels) served as a co-producer, although the film's ownership rights were still with Filmline. It was filmed in Canada from August 1997 to October 1997, in the Eastern Townships of Quebec. Locales used in the movie include Sutton Junction, Vale Perkins, Highwater, Mansonville, and Mont Owl's Head.

=== Casting ===
John Cusack, Alec Baldwin, Nicolas Cage, Alicia Silverstone and Japanese singer Seiko Matsuda were all originally attached to the project.

In a 2008 interview, Thomas Haden Church revealed that in order to do Free Money, he had to turn down a role in Steven Spielberg's Saving Private Ryan, which was shot in western Europe between June 1997 and August 1997. He said, "at the exact same time I was offered the lead in Free Money with Charlie Sheen and Marlon Brando, I was offered a role in Saving Private Ryan. And I chose to march off to Canada to work with Marlon Brando. I had a manager at the time—we were soon parted—but he was like, "You're gonna go do a movie with Marlon Brando that more than likely no one will see, vs. a really nice role in a movie that's probably going to win Best Picture next year?" And he was right! But the experience working with Marlon in his penultimate performance was irreplaceable. And I spent 10, 12 weeks with him in Quebec, and it was a remarkable experience, and I wouldn't trade it for any credit on my résumé."

The film was certified as a Quebec production since one of the leading cast members, Donald Sutherland, was a resident of the province. In addition to this, several supporting roles went to local actors. Producer Nicolas Clermont noted that the accents of the local actors could be integrated into the story, since it was set in a small, unidentified border town.

== Release and home media ==
In the United States, the film aired on Starz in March 1999, and received a North American VHS release six months later. Lionsgate then released the film on DVD on February 19, 2004. A high resolution print of the film was later released to digital platforms in the 2010s.

== Reception ==
In October 1999, Troy Patterson of Entertainment Weekly gave Free Money a mixed review. He wrote, "this is a screwball heist farce of the Coen Brothers school, but it's too diffuse and thus too screwy." He had a positive view of Brando's presence in the film, writing "on the other hand, Brando, who flails about like a deranged walrus, hasn't seemed so unabashedly playful since Guys and Dolls." John Leonard of New York Magazine also considered it to be emulating the Coen Brothers, writing in March 1999 that "director Yves Simoneau and scriptwriters Joseph Brutsman and Tony Peck are obviously aiming for a Fargo sort of farce. What they achieve is more like Wayne's World meets Winesburg, Ohio at the corner of Twin Peaks and Peyton Place". When ranking Marlon Brando's 40 film performances in 2024, IndieWire placed Free Money 29th. They state, "this clunky, Coens-esque caper comedy sports an incomprehensible plot and thuddingly broad humor; but the worst thing about it is that it wastes one of Brando's last lead performances."
