= Sophistication =

Word derived from sophistry

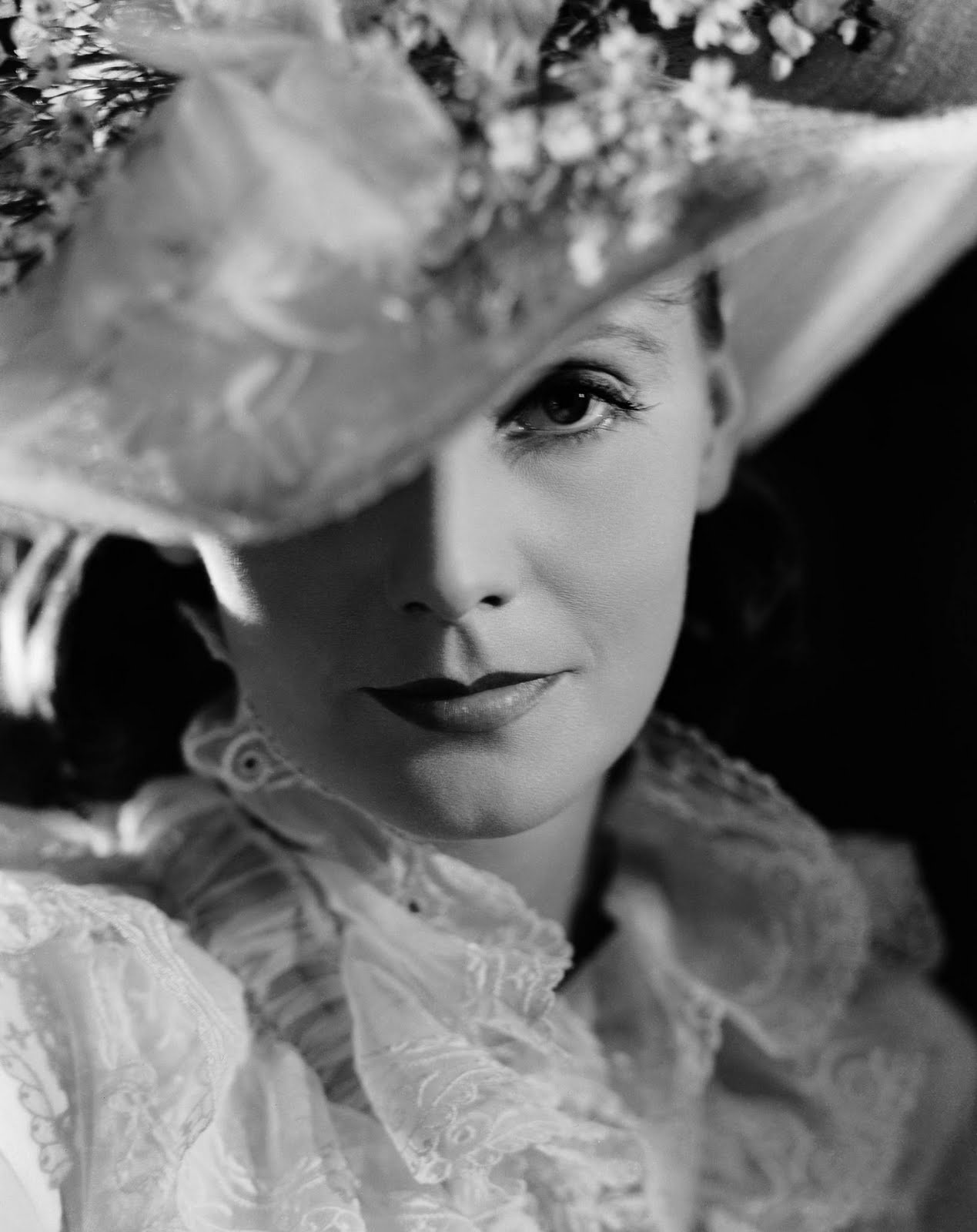
Greta Garbo in a publicity still for Anna Karenina, 1935

Sophistication refers to the qualities of refinement, good taste, and wisdom. By contrast, its original use was as a pejorative, derived from sophist, and included the idea of admixture or adulteration. Today, as researched by Faye Hammill, it is common as a measure of refinement—displaying good taste, wisdom and subtlety rather than crudeness, stupidity and vulgarity.

== Scope of sophistication ==
In social terms, the connotations of sophistication depend on whether one is an insider or an outsider of the sophisticated class. Sophistication can be seen as "a form of snobbery," or as "among the most desirable of human qualities."

A study of style conveys an idea of the range of possible elements through which one can demonstrate sophistication in elegance and fashion, covering the art of "[...] the shoemaker, the hairdresser, the cosmetologist, the cookbook writers, the chef, the diamond merchant, the couturieres, and the fashion queens, the inventors of the folding umbrella ... and of champagne."

== History ==
In Ancient Greece, sophia was the special insight of poets and prophets. This then became the wisdom of philosophers such as sophists. But their use of rhetoric to win arguments gave sophistication a derogatory quality. Sophistry was then the art of misleading.

The system of modern Western sophistication has its roots in France, arguably helped along its way by the policies of King Louis XIV (reigned 1643–1715).

The English regarded sophistication as decadent and deceptive until the aristocratic sensibilities and refined elegance of Regency dandies such as Beau Brummell (1778–1840) became fashionable and admired.

== Types of sophistication ==
Recognised varieties of sophistication include:

- cultural sophistication (or culturedness)
- intellectual sophistication

In the analysis of humor, Victor Raskin distinguishes "two types of sophistication: limited access or allusive knowledge, and complex processing".

== Acquiring sophistication ==
Methods of acquiring the appearance of personal sophistication include:

- educational travel – note the function of the traditional Grand Tour for European aesthetes
- Finishing school

On a societal level commentators can associate various forms of sophistication with civilization.
