= Rosamund Dashwood =

Rosamund Margaret Dashwood (13 January 1924, Devonshire, England – 3 April 2007, Squamish, BC) was one of the top female masters (i.e. over 35) runners in Canadian history.

== Life ==
Rosamund was born in 1924 to Major Arthur Paul Dashwood (younger son of Sir George Dashwood, 6th Baronet), an engineer who built the massive docks in Hong Kong Harbour, and his wife Edmée Elizabeth Monica Dashwood, née de la Pasture, who was a celebrated author. Many of her mother's novels, under the pen name E. M. Delafield, are semi-autobiographical, and so the young daughter who appears can be taken to be based on Rosamund. Rosamund's only sibling, Lionel, died in 1940. Her mother died in 1943.

During World War II, she joined the Women's Auxiliary Air Force and worked with the newly invented and still top secret radar. After the war, she attended Somerville College and met Leslie Truelove, whom she married. He became team manager for Amateur Athletic Association of England and supported Roger Bannister, the first man to break the four-minute mile. The couple had four sons: Paul, Simon, Patrick, and Michael.

In 1960, the family emigrated to Canada and she lived the rest of her life there. Leslie became Associate Director of The Canadian Arthritis Society. Rosamund died on April 3, 2007, at the age of 83, in Squamish, British Columbia.

== Provincial Daughter ==
In 1961, Dashwood published Provincial Daughter, a light-hearted continuation of her mother's most famous work. Stylistically similar to Diary of a Provincial Lady, it is a semi-autobiographical account of domestic life in the 1950s. In the foreword, Dashwood wrote:

It seemed natural to write it in the same idiom, but if the result seems to any reader too imitative, or even plagiaristic, I can only ask their forgiveness, as the original Provincial Lady would, I am sure, most warmly have given hers.

The novel was a success and was re-issued in 2002 by Virago Press.

== Running ==
Dashwood took up long-distance running at middle age, partly as a way to deal with the death of her husband, who had died of a heart attack while running the 1976 Vancouver Marathon.

Despite her late start, she went on to have a remarkable career in which she set numerous age-class world records and Canadian records. Highlights of her career include setting the world record for the fastest 10K by a woman aged 65 or older at 46:18, and winning four gold medals at the World Seniors' Games (see World Masters Games). A talented cyclist and swimmer as well, she completed several triathlons. She also competed in relay triathlons, often with teammates who were many years younger.

She continued to run into her seventies.
