= Consequential =

Consequential may refer to:

- Consequential mood, a verb form in Eskaleut languages

As an adjective, the term may also describe:

- something arising as a result
- something of importance
- in law, results arising indirectly, for example consequential damages

== See also ==
- Consequence (disambiguation)
- Consequential strangers
