= 1989 Quebec municipal elections =

Series of Canadian municipal elections

Several municipalities in the Canadian province of Quebec held municipal elections to elect mayors and councillors on November 5, 1989. One of the most closely watched contests was in Quebec City, where Jean-Paul L'Allier of the Rassemblement populaire party ended the twenty-five year rule of the Civic Progress Party. L'Allier defeated Civic Progress candidate Jean-Francois Bertrand by a fairly significant margin.

== Results (incomplete) ==
=== Verdun ===
Former Liberal Party of Canada Member of Parliament (MP) Raymond Savard was elected to his second term as mayor in the on-island Montreal suburb of Verdun, easily defeating opponents Jean-Marie Demers and Robert Mailhot. Most elected councillors were from Savard's Regroupement des citoyens de Verdun party.

Party colours in the results listed below have been randomly chosen and do not indicate affiliation with or resemblance to any municipal, provincial, or federal party.

| Electoral District | Position | Total valid votes | Candidates | |
| Electoral District | Position | Total valid votes | Regroupement des citoyens de Verdun | Independents |
|---|---|---|---|---|
| | Mayor | 12,831 | Raymond Savard (incumbent); 7,482 (58.31%) | Jean-Marie Demers; 4,290 (33.43%) Robert Mailhot; 1,059 (8.25%) |
| District 1 | City councillor | | | Arthur Benarroch (incumbent); Elected Danielle D. Hébert |
| District 2 | City councillor | | | Marvin Reisler; Elected Jacques Dagenais |
| District 3 | City councillor | | Jacques Lauzon (incumbent); Elected | Normand Vinette |
| District 4 | City councillor | | Bruno Fortin Joyeu | Robert Filiatraut (incumbent); Elected Roland Casés |
| District 5 | City councillor | | Jocelyn Beauvais (incumbent); Elected | Richard Patry |
| District 6 | City councillor | | France Lecocq; Elected | Marcel Henley Aimé Pinette Charles Sylvestre |
| District 7 | City councillor | | Laurent Dugas (incumbent); Elected | Spiros Lazaratos |
| District 8 | City councillor | | Claude Ravary (incumbent); Elected | Michel Éthier |
| District 9 | City councillor | | Elliott Goldsborough (incumbent) | Nicole Petit; Elected |
| District 10 | City councillor | | Olivette Thérèse Dionne; Elected | André Martin |
| District 11 | City councillor | | Maurice Couturier (incumbent); Elected | Gabriel Dorion |
| District 12 | City councillor | | Suzanne Dunne (incumbent); Elected | Jacques Desnoyers |
| District 13 | City councillor | | John Gallagher (incumbent); Elected | Claude Lecompte |

Sources: "La liste des candidats," La Presse, 5 November 1989, A7; Florian Bernard, "Verdun: Savard reporté au pouvoir; Pierrefonds: Morin élu," La Presse, 6 November 1989, B5; Élus de Verdun de 1875 à 2005, City of Montreal. (The first two sources erroneously list Savard's mayoral opponent Demers as the leader of the Regroupement des citoyens de Verdun. This is contradicted by other sources, and, indeed, the second La Presse article indicates that Savard's party won a majority on council.)
