= Martha Ostenso =

American screenwriter

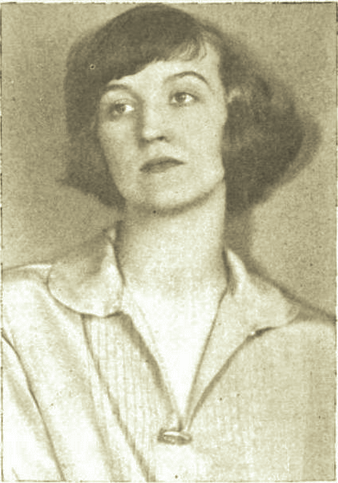
Martha Ostenso

Martha Ostenso (17 September 1900 – 24 November 1963) was a Norwegian American novelist and screenwriter who is also an important figure in Canadian literary history.

== Early life and education ==
Martha Ostenso was born in Haukeland (now part of Bergen), in Hordaland County, Norway. Her parents were Sigurd and Olina (née Tungeland) Ostenso. She emigrated with her family to the province of Manitoba, Canada, where she first settled in Brandon before moving to Winnipeg. Ostenso taught in a rural school and attended the University of Manitoba for approximately one year; she never graduated. While studying at the University of Manitoba, she was a student of Douglas Durkin, a professor in the English Department. Shortly thereafter Durkin left his wife and children and moved to New York City; Ostenso joined him there. They lived together in New York, where she studied at Columbia University.

== Career ==
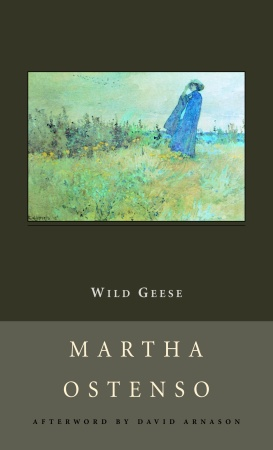
Wild Geese by Martha Ostenso

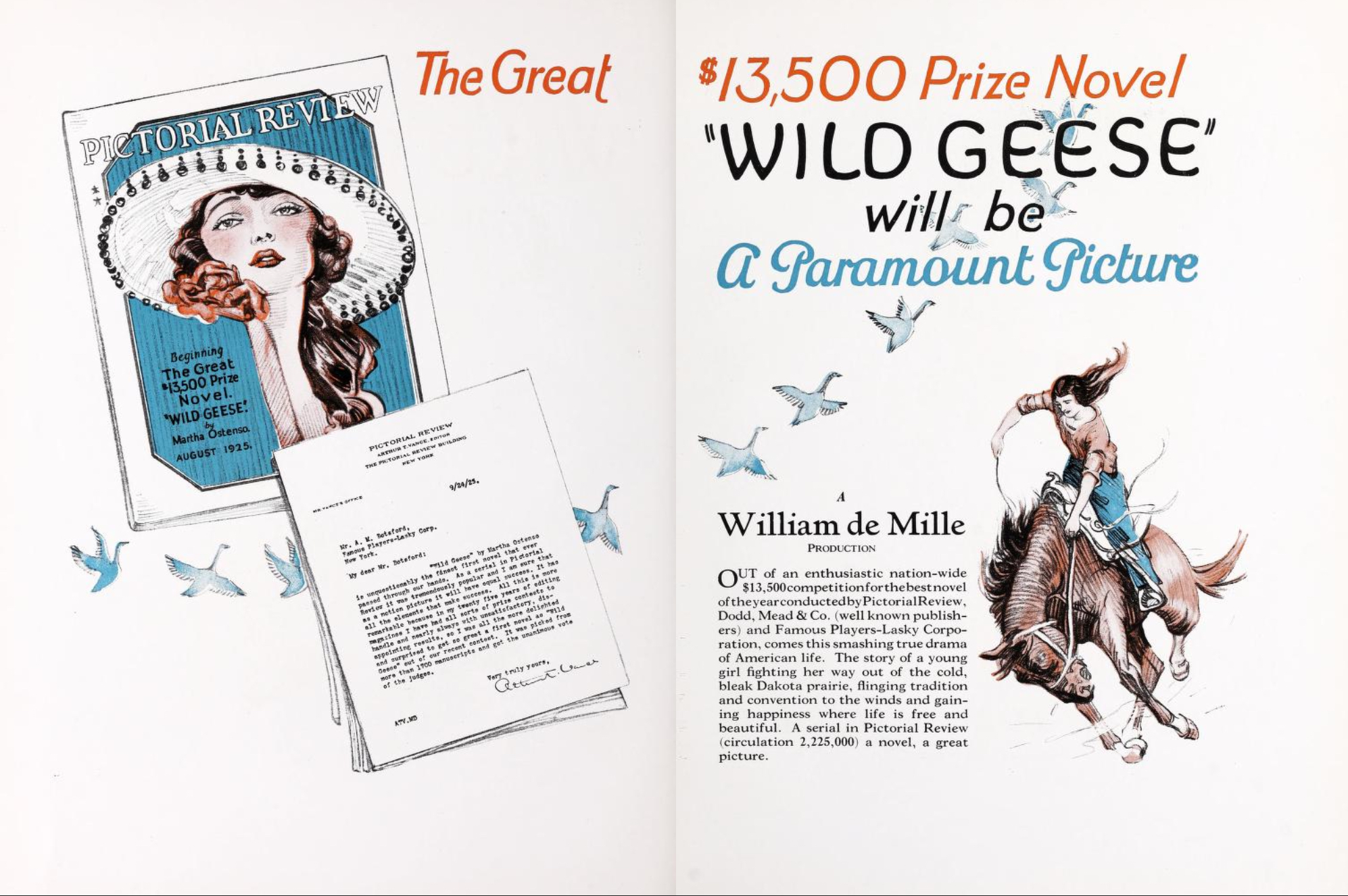
1925 Paramount advertisement refers to Ostenso's book for a film it never produced

Martha Ostenso worked as a social worker in New York; she and Durkin were active in the literary circles of the time. Ostenso's best-known novel, Wild Geese, was published in 1925. The book, about a young schoolteacher sent to teach in rural Manitoba, was hailed by critics, including in analysis by Faye Hammill, as a landmark in Canadian realism; it won the 1925 Dodd, Mead and Company Best Novel of the Year Award. It made her a well-known and best-selling author. A film version of Wild Geese was made in 1927.

Ostenso and Durkin later moved to South Dakota and then to Minnesota. Many of her novels were based on Minnesota farm life; most incorporate elements of romance and melodrama. Ostenso portrays the lives of rural immigrants with dignity. Although none of her later novels ever reached the acclaim Wild Geese attracted, most continued to explore a similar theme: the relationship between men and women and the land they work. A number of her other works were translated and have been reprinted several times.

In 1931, Ostenso acquired American citizenship. She continued to publish short stories, magazine serials and novels, and wrote a number of screenplays. Although it is now known that Ostenso collaborated with Durkin, all their writing appeared under her name alone. She produced fifteen more novels, the most successful of which was O River, Remember, a novel about a family in the Red River Valley of Minnesota which won a Literary Guild selection in 1943. Another significant novel is The Young May Moon (1929), which critic Stan Atherton identified as possibly the best in the canon. A new edition of this novel was published by Borealis Press in 2022.

Asked how to pronounce her name, she told The Literary Digest, "Of the three syllables in Ostenso, the first receives the major accent, the second is without accent, the third receives a minor accent. The final result is as if you spoke the name Austin and added so as an afterthought."

After Durkin's wife died, he and Ostenso married in 1945.

Martha Ostenso and Durkin lived for a time in Hollywood, California, where they had friends among the movie stars of the 1930s and 40s. Ostenso's novel Wild Geese was filmed as The Cry of the Wild Geese in 1961 as a West-German and Austrian co-production and later as After the Harvest in 2001 as a made-for-television movie for Canadian TV starring Sam Shepard.

== Death ==
The film industry lifestyle impacted Ostenso's and Durkin's health, as well as their productivity and the quality of their work. In 1963, the couple moved to Seattle, Washington, to be near Durkin's sons. Shortly after the move, Ostenso died from cirrhosis of the liver, the result of years of heavy drinking.

== Selected bibliography ==
- A Far Land, Ostenso's only book of poetry. (1924)
- Wild Geese (1925)
- The Dark Dawn (1926)
- The Mad Carews (1927)
- The Young May Moon (1929)
- The Waters Under the Earth (1930)
- Prologue to Love (1932)
- There's Always Another Year (1933)
- The White Reef (1934)
- The Stone Field (1937)
- The Mandrake Root (1938)
- Love Passed This Way (1942)
- And They Shall Walk (1943, with Sister Elizabeth Kenny)
- O River, Remember! (1943)
- Milk Route (1948)
- The Sunset Tree (1949)
- A Man Had Tall Sons (1958)
