= 1993 Quebec municipal elections =

Eight hundred and thirty-one municipalities in the Canadian province of Quebec held municipal elections to elect mayors and councillors on November 7, 1993. Incumbent mayor Jean-Paul L'Allier was re-elected in Quebec City and his Rassemblement Populaire party won sixteen out of twenty council seats.

Municipal elections were not held in Montreal, Quebec's largest city, in this electoral cycle. The previous municipal election in Montreal took place in 1990 and the next was scheduled for 1994.

== Results ==
=== Laval ===
1993 Laval municipal election: Mayor of Laval
Party	Candidate	Votes	%
PRO Laval	(x)Gilles Vaillancourt	68,939	60.81
Option Laval	Jean Rizzuto	26,456	23.34
Parti Lavallois	Serge Tremblay	16,878	14.89
Independent	Rick Blatter	1,087	0.96
Total valid votes		113,360	100

Source: "Incumbents all re-elected in Montreal East voting," Montreal Gazette, 9 November 1993, A6.

== Verdun ==
Party colours have been randomly chosen and do not indicate affiliation with or resemblance to any municipal, provincial, or federal party.

Electoral District	Position	Total valid votes	Candidates			
Electoral District	Position	Total valid votes	Parti d'action municipale	S.O.S. Taxes Verdun	Regroupement des Citoyens de Verdun	Independents
	Mayor	21,182	Georges Bossé; 13,831 (65.30%)	Edmond Vigneau; 1,801 (8.50%)	Raymond Savard (incumbent); 5,550 (26.20%)	
District 1	City councillor	1,784	Arthur Bennaroch (incumbent); 1,333 (74.72%)		Gilbert Devantery; 112 (6.28%)	Michel Lesage; 339 (19.00%)
District 2	City councillor	1,546	Marvin Reisler (incumbent); 856 (55.37%)		Micheline Coderre; 102 (6.60%)	Robert Isabelle; 588 (38.03%)
District 3	City councillor	1,763	Jacques Lauzon (incumbent); 1,333 (75.61%)	Jacques Desnoyers; 231 (13.10%)	Michel-Charles Charlebois; 199 (11.29%)	
District 4	City councillor	1,747	Ginette Patry; 872 (49.91%)		Robert Filiatrault (incumbent); 637 (36.46%)	Michel Larin; 238 (13.62%)
District 5	City councillor	1,706	Alain Tassé; 863 (50.59%)		Jocelyn Beauvais (incumbent); 608 (35.64%)	Jean-Louis Ladouceur; 235 (13.77%)
District 6	City councillor	1,604	Danielle Mimeault; 1,141 (71.13%)	Charles Sylvestre; 180 (11.22%)	Lorraine Wade-Labreche; 283 (17.64%)	
District 7	City councillor	1,365	Laurent Dugas (incumbent); 831 (60.88%)	Andre Tremblay; 184 (13.48%)	Denis Gouin; 350 (25.64%)	
District 8	City councillor	1,427	Claude Ravary (incumbent); 997 (69.87%)		Michel Ethier; 430 (30.13%)	
District 9	City councillor	1,492	Nicole Santerre; 818 (54.83%)		Nicole Petit (incumbent); 495 (33.18%)	Maurice Roch; 179 (12.00%)
District 10	City councillor	1,546	France Lecocq (incumbent for Division 6); 767 (49.61%)	Suzanne Vigneau; 202 (13.07%)	Olivette Therese Dionne (incumbent); 577 (37.32%)	
District 11	City councillor	1,770	Louis Leblanc; 1,031 (58.25%)	Gabriel Dorion; 220 (12.43%)	Yolande Masse; 519 (29.32%)	
District 12	City councillor	1,719	Suzanne Dunne (incumbent); 1,193 (69.40%)	Jean-Marie Demers; 130 (7.56%)	Real Moses; 396 (23.04%)	
District 13	City councillor	1,728	John Gallagher (incumbent); 1,041 (60.24%)	Pierre Deschamps; 122 (7.06%)	Maurice Guay; 354 (20.49%)	Francine Couture; 211 (12.21%)

Source: "Incumbents all re-elected in Montreal East voting," Montreal Gazette, 9 November 1993, A6.
