= Diary of a Provincial Lady =

1930 novel by E. M. Delafield

- Author: E. M. Delafield
- Language: English
- Genre: Comedy novel, fictional diary
- Publisher: Macmillan & Co
- Publication date: 1930 novel
- Publication place: United Kingdom
- Media type: Print (hardback & paperback)
- ISBN: 9780099584438
- Followed by: The Provincial Lady Goes Further

Diary of a Provincial Lady, by E. M. Delafield, is the comic fictional diary of an upper middle-class Englishwoman living in a Devon village, published in 1930. The novel is autobiographical and has never been out of print. Its success led to three sequels, and provided inspiration for similar fictional diaries, such as the Bridget Jones series.

== Authorship and origin ==
Novelist E. M. Delafield was born Edmée Elizabeth Monica de la Pasture in 1890. Her mother, Mrs Henry de la Pasture, was a successful novelist, and her father was a French count whose family escaped to England during the French Revolution.

Her husband, Arthur Dashwood, was a land agent (i.e. he was responsible for conducting the business affairs of a large landed estate), and Delafield boosted their income by writing articles for the "feminist, socialist and progressive" magazine Time and Tide. Diary of a Provincial Lady began as a weekly serial in Time and Tide from December 1929 onwards, at the request of the editor Margaret Haig Thomas, Lady Rhondda. It was largely autobiographical – Delafield, her husband and children were the basis of the main characters.

It was published as a book in 1930 and became a bestseller, making Delafield internationally famous and giving rise to three sequels. Writing in The Guardian, novelist Jilly Cooper explained how the diary began:

"The editor of Time and Tide, then a large-circulation weekly of which Delafield was a director, wanted something light and readable, preferably in serial form, to fill the centre pages. And so, in her beautiful house in Devonshire, she began to note down the routine follies and storms in teacups of life in the provinces. From the moment they appeared, the diaries enchanted everyone. They were incredibly funny, and yet, in a way, as homely and reassuringly familiar as the rattle of pips in a Cox's apple. The demand grew. The diaries were gathered into a first, then a second volume, and two more followed, taking her to America and then into wartime."

Apart from the Provincial Lady series, which has never been out of print, Delafield has remained a minor novelist. Her other books are difficult to source.

== Synopsis ==
The fictional diary is written by an unnamed provincial woman who lives in Devon. She is an upper middle-class, married woman in her thirties. Husband Robert is a land agent who spends his evenings falling asleep in his chair reading the newspaper. Son Robin is away at boarding school, and daughter Vicky has a French governess, known as Mademoiselle.

She has to deal with the snobbish Lady Boxe, the trying but well-meaning Vicar's wife and other local characters, along with a household of servants always on the verge of quitting. Day to day activities are detailed, along with stretched finances, and trying to look stylish and keep up with the latest trends. She visits literary friends in London, and tries her hand at writing.

Cooper noted: "Throughout the diaries... great comic capital is made out of the heroine's constant juggling with her housekeeping accounts, pawning jewellery, selling clothes and writing endless placating letters to bank managers and creditors."

As the series of novels unfolded, the Provincial Lady moved away from her domestic setting, became part of London literary society, then travelled to the United States on a book tour.

== Reception at the time ==
Reviews were enthusiastic. The diaries "made Delafield a bestselling author and a literary celebrity in England and the United States." A London correspondent writing in the Auckland Star said: "The diary is one of the books of the season, and not to have read it is to be quite incompetent to maintain a proper dinner-table conversation".

It was described as one of the brightest examples of the diary form that had recently appeared and "gives a most entertaining insight into the workings of the feminine mind." Reviews said woman readers would delight in a book full of familiar situations. Delafield had created "a type which is the composite picture of many women."

The book became a "commercial and cultural barnstormer". After the author's death, however, her works "sunk into the trough of neglect and reaction that often lasts 50 years or more until a new generation discovers them afresh."

== Re-evaluation ==
Best-selling novelist Jilly Cooper first read the Diary in the early 1970s, as the British women's liberation movement was gathering strength. She had just published How to Stay Married, a book of humorous guidance, and decades later, she attributed part of the success of Delafield's novels to their "marvellous portrait of a marriage". With the international success of Helen Fielding's episodic novel about a hapless young woman-about-town, which also started as a serial before being collected into a book, attention returned to Delafield. In 2005 in The New Yorker, Cynthia Zarin said Delafield created a genre of which the best-known contemporary example is Bridget Jones's Diary, which "relies on many of the conventions that Delafield introduced".

English literature professor Faye Hammill wrote that the diaries were usually described as "chronicles of ordinariness and domesticity, and their heroine as a representative 'type'," however, the Provincial Lady "protests against the demands and restrictions of these roles, and, crucially, escapes them to a certain extent." Catherine Keyser from the University of South Carolina wrote: "E. M. Delafield adopted this cozy feminine role for herself in the public eye to render palatable the ambitious professionalism of her journalism and novel-writing."

In 2020, Kathryn Hughes wrote in the Guardian: "The self-effacing diarist anxiously trying to keep up appearances in the Great Depression provides consoling comedy in trying times."

== Subsequent novels ==
=== The Provincial Lady Goes Further (1932) ===
In this follow-up diary, the Provincial Lady has acquired a flat in London and has had some success as a writer. The Times noted: "Miss E. M. Delafield's light touch is as gay and satiric in her new story of the Provincial Lady as it was in the earlier volume."

=== The Provincial Lady in America (1934) ===
The Provincial Lady is invited to visit the United States following her literary success. According to The Times "she is always characteristically herself, full of vitality, and well able to meet all her social obligations in spite of her attacks of nerves... With all its slightness there is wisdom as well as fun in this absurd diary... For her readers the pleasure prevails."

=== The Provincial Lady in War-Time (1940) ===
The Provincial Lady goes to London to help with the war effort. She is a volunteer worker at an ARP canteen, and finally becomes a writer for the Ministry of Information. A review noted: "Miss Delafield's book shows, far better than any other picture of the period has shown, how completely the disruption of the normal life of England is taken for granted, and how thoroughly self-sacrificing everybody is — even if they laugh at their own efforts."

After the success of the first two volumes of the Provincial Lady, her American publisher Cass Canfield suggested that Delafield visit a Russian collective farm. This led to the book, Straw Without Bricks, which was not originally intended as part of the Provincial Lady series. However, it was later reprinted as The Provincial Lady in Russia. Three parts of the book were originally published in Harper's Magazine (The Provincial Lady in Moscow; They Also Serve: The Provincial Lady in Leningrad; and To Speak My Mind About Russia: The Provincial Lady in Odessa).

== See also ==
List of fictional diaries
