= Kirtlington Park =

18th-century Palladian house

Coordinates: 51.8748°N 1.2632°W

Kirtlington Park is an 18th-century, 36,700 sq ft (3,410 m^{2}) Palladian country house about half a mile east of Kirtlington village in Oxfordshire, England. Constructed in 1742–46, the house is a Grade I listed building. It is set in 3,000 acres (1,200 ha) of parkland, landscaped by Lancelot "Capability" Brown, with views over the gardens to the Chiltern Hills.

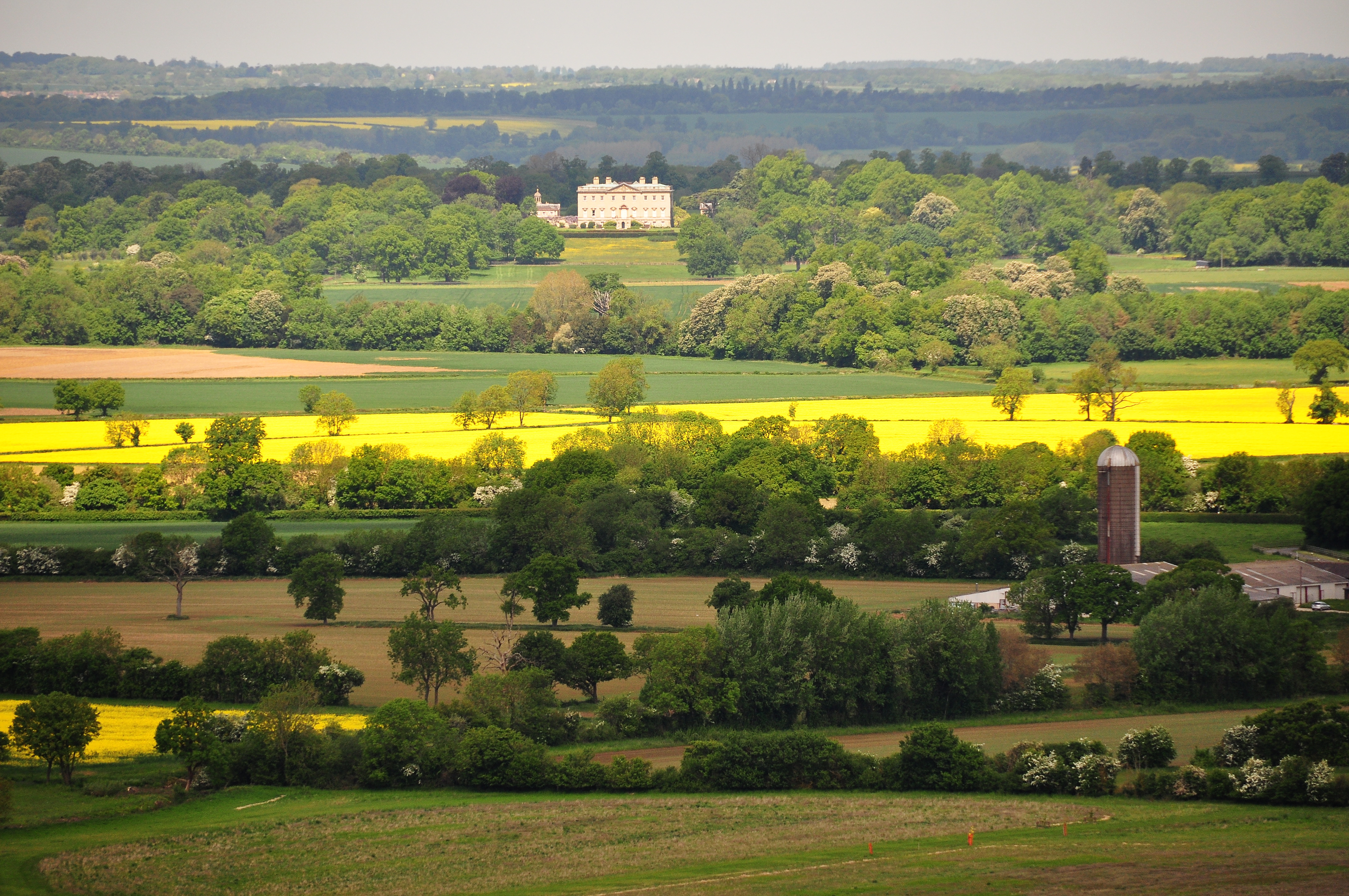
Kirtlington Park, Oxfordshire.

== History ==
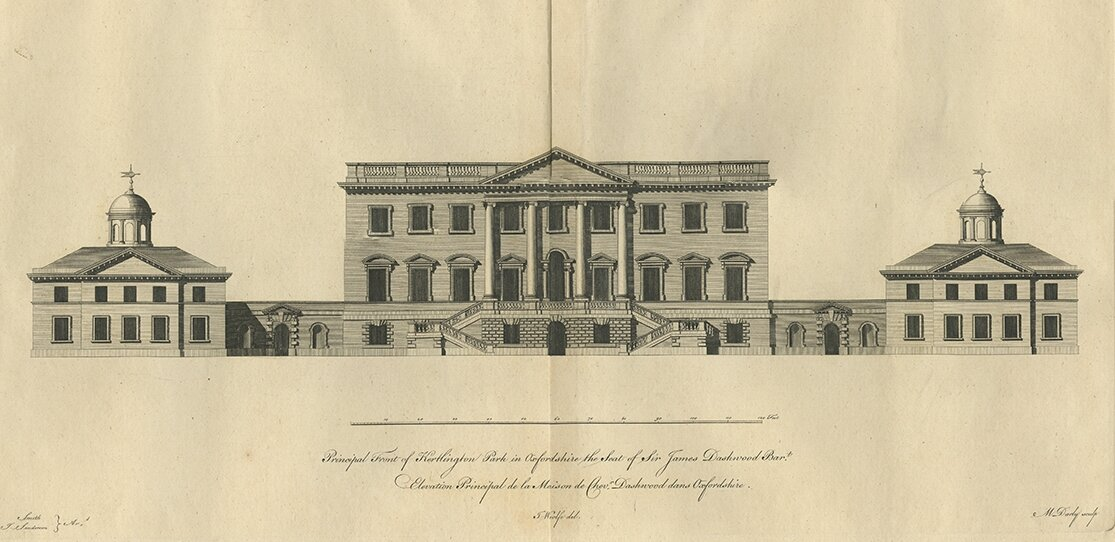
Kirtlington Park principal front plan

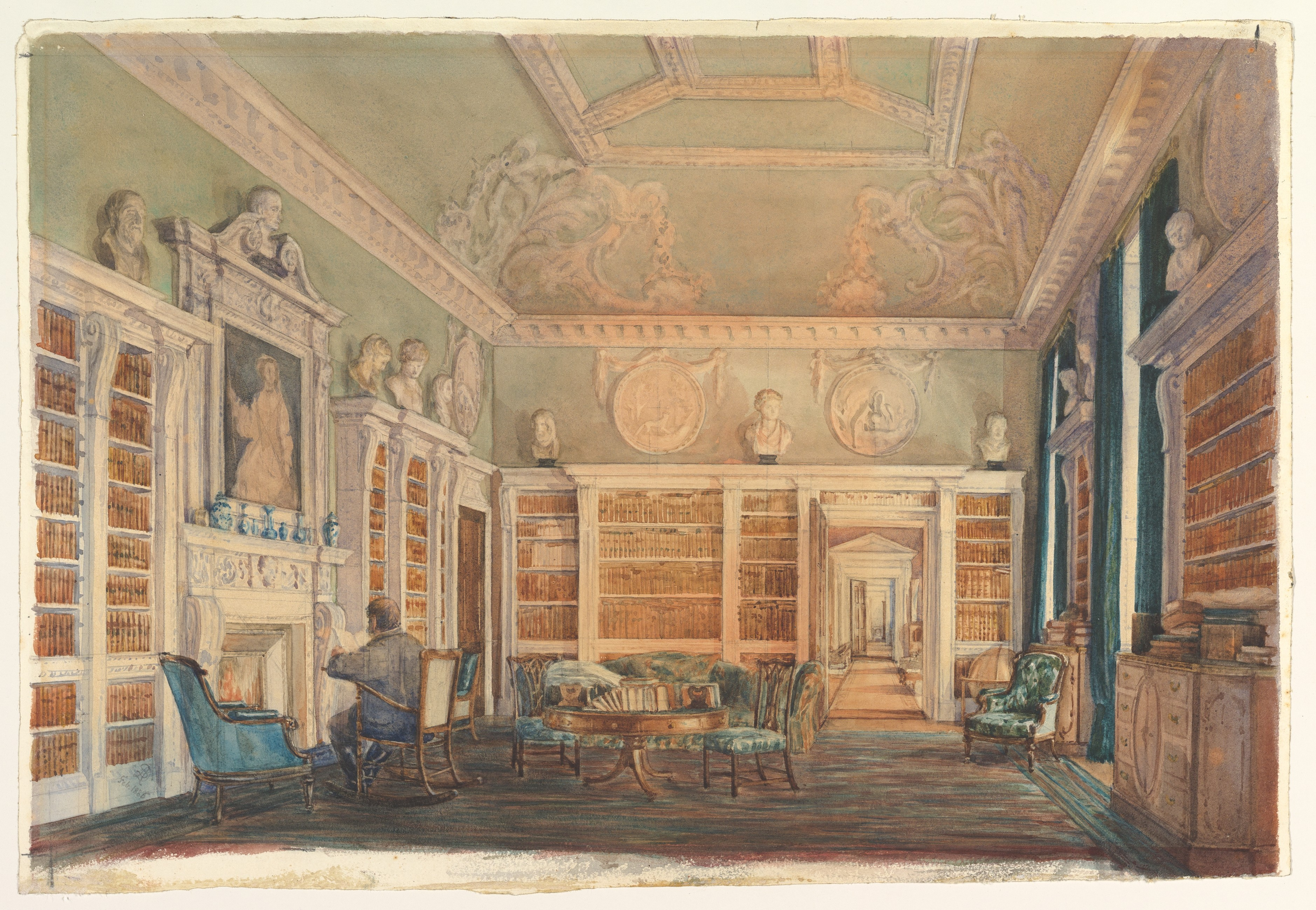
Kirtlington Park Library with rococo plasterwork by renowned Thomas Roberts of Oxford.

The house was built for Sir James Dashwood, 2nd Baronet (1715–1779) in 1742 to 1746, after he had married Elizabeth Spencer, daughter and co-heiress of Edward Spencer of Rendlesham. Elizabeth's only sister was Anne, Duchess of Hamilton and she was reported to be worth £70,000.

Kirtlington Park was constructed in the years 1742 to 1746, by William Smith of Warwick and John Sanderson, starting from plans by James Gibbs; the grounds were laid out by Lancelot Brown. Dashwood also built up a significant library, and in 1747 was paying James Lovell, the sculptor and interior decorator. By the end of 1746, Dashwood had spent a total amount of £26,000 for the house although the work still hasn't finished yet, this increase to £32,388 in 1759 as some work was also carried in the garden and grounds.

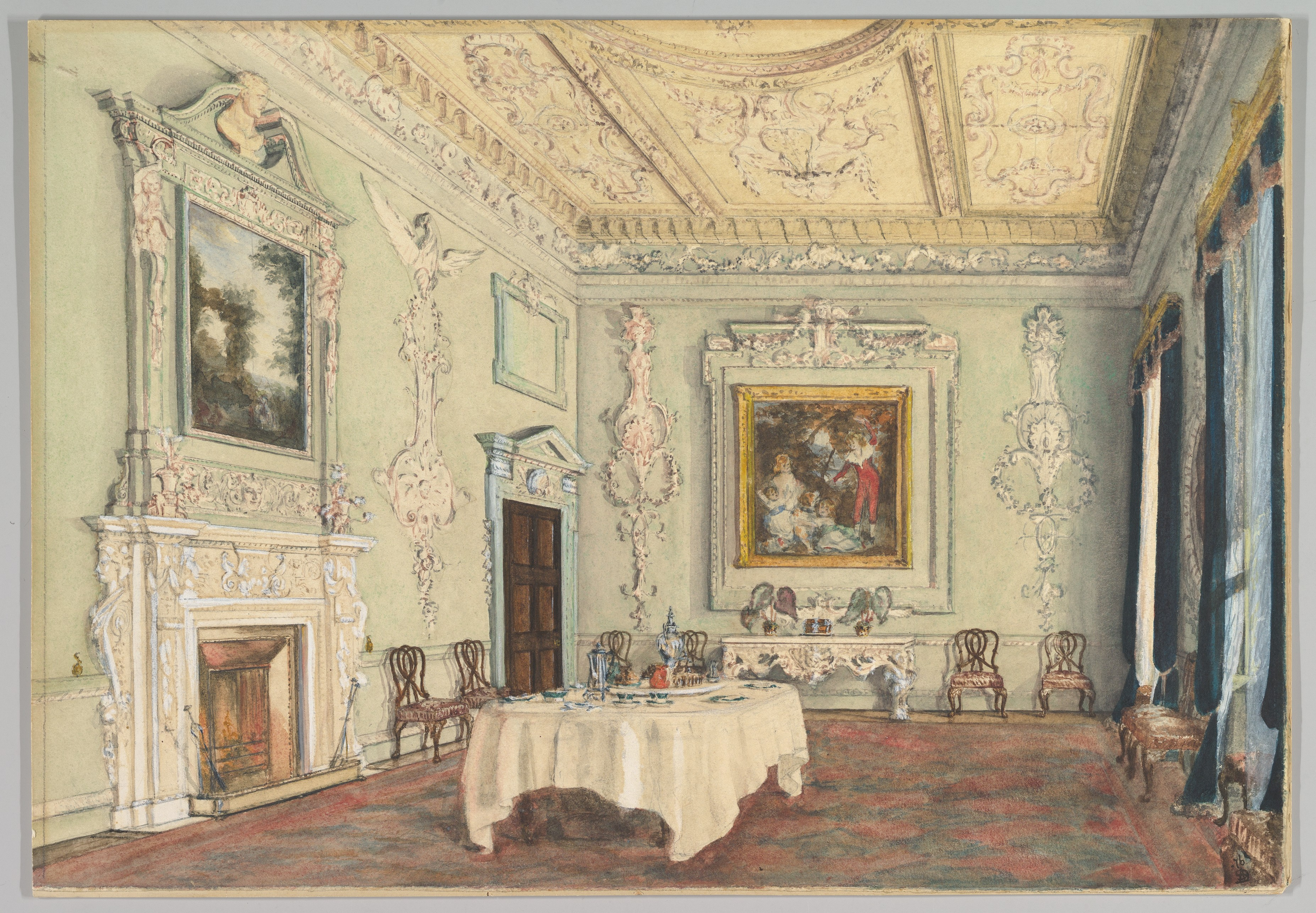
Kirtlington Dining Room donated to MET Museum

The Dashwoods had already moved in 1745, but Kirtlington Park was still not completed when Sir James Dashwood died in 1779. Some parts of the house were left unfinished until the 1820s as his son Sir Henry Dashwood, 3rd Baronet gambled excessively with his cousin the 6th Duke of Marlborough. The saloon and the main staircase were eventually completed by his son Sir George Dashwood, 4th Baronet.

Kirtlington remained in the family until 1909, when Sir George John Egerton Dashwood, 6th baronet, sold the house to the 12th Earl of Leven and Melville. By 1922 it was owned by Hubert Maitland Budgett.

In the Second World War the park was used as a Victory garden.

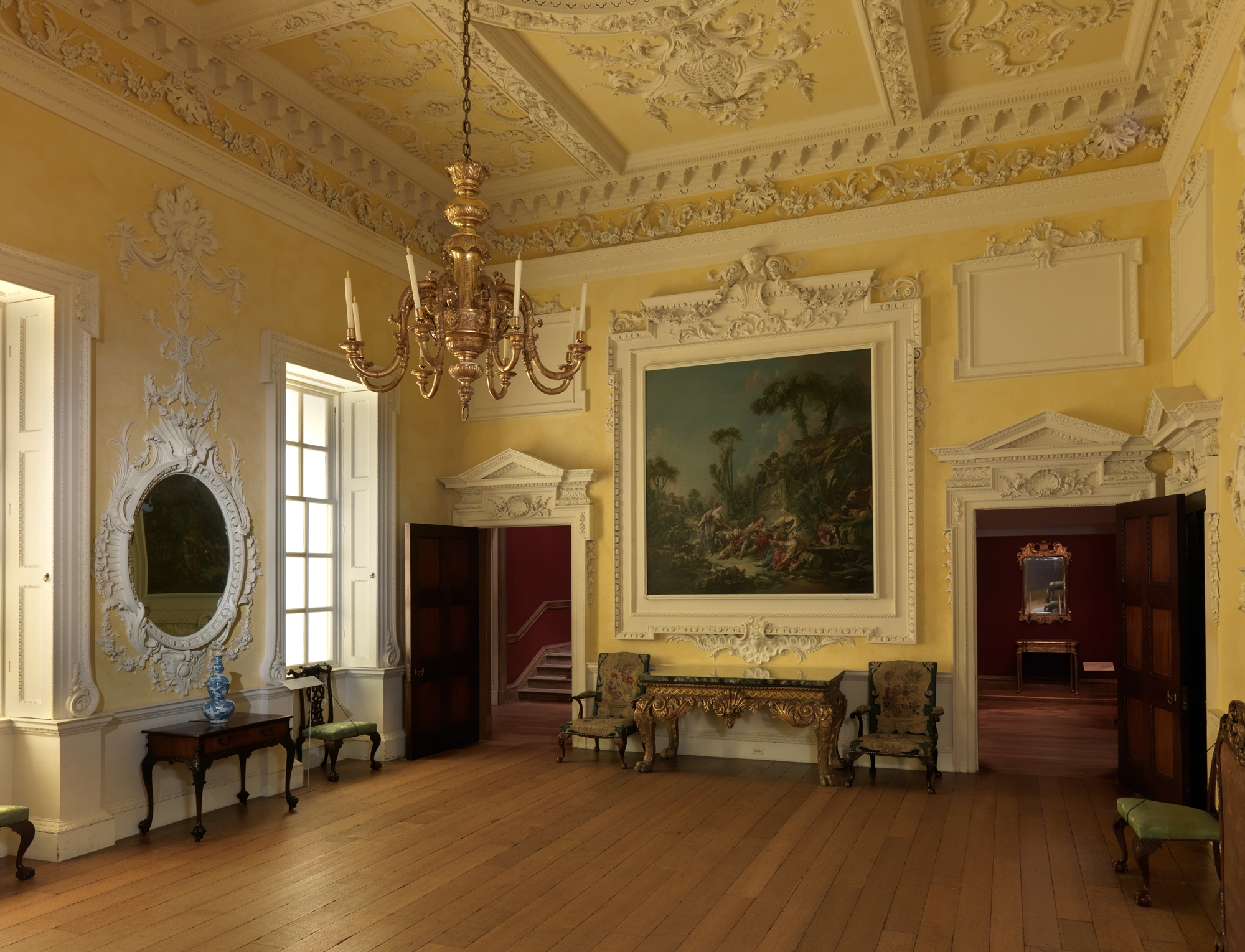
Kirtlington Dining Room at the MET Museum

In 1931 the rococo dining room was exported, and it is now in the Metropolitan Museum of Art. Involved in it were Thomas Roberts (plasterwork), and either Henry Cheere or John Cheere (chimneypiece). Today, Kirtlington Park is licensed to hold civil weddings.

=== Polo ===
Hubert Budgett started the polo club in 1926 after Major Deed convinced him to take up the sport. Alan Budgett, the son of Hubert Budgett, reopened the club and erected a second ground in 1954, following the Second World War. A sixth polo ground was added by 2005. Notable athletes who began their careers at Kirtlington Park include Robert Thame, Henry Brett, and Malcolm Borwick.

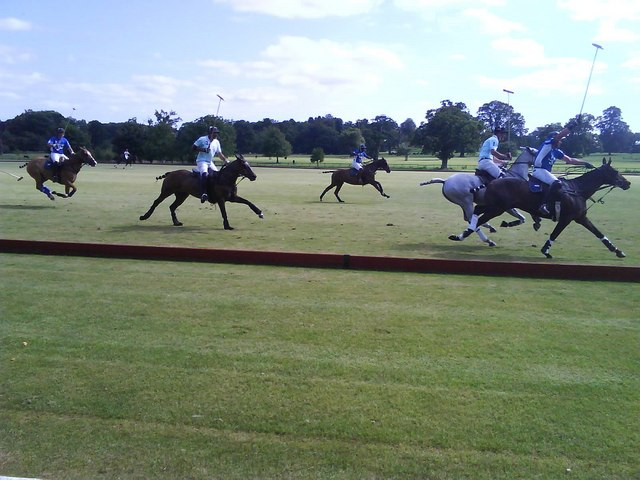
Kirtlington Polo Ground.
