= Wild Geese (film) =

1927 film

- Directed by: Phil Goldstone
- Written by: A. P. Younger
- Based on: Wild Geese; 1925 novel by Martha Ostenso
- Produced by: L. L. Ostrow; John M. Stahl
- Starring: Belle Bennett; Russell Simpson; Eve Southern
- Cinematography: Max Dupont; E. Fox Walker; Joseph Dubray
- Edited by: Martin G. Cohn
- Distributed by: Tiffany-Stahl
- Release date: November 15, 1927
- Running time: 70 minutes
- Country: United States
- Language: Silent (English intertitles)

Wild Geese is a 1927 American silent drama film directed by Phil Goldstone and starring Belle Bennett and Russell Simpson. Based upon the 1925 novel of the same name by Martha Ostenso, it was distributed by Tiffany-Stahl Pictures.

== Cast ==
- Belle Bennett as Amelia Gare
- Russell Simpson as Caleb Gare
- Eve Southern as Judith Gare
- Donald Keith as Sven Sandbo
- Jason Robards as Mark Jordan
- Anita Stewart as Lind Archer
- Wesley Barry as Martin Gare
- Rada Rae as Ellen Gare
- Austin Jewel as Charlie Gare
- Evelyn Selbie as Mrs. Klovatz
- D'Arcy Corrigan as Mr. Klovatz
- Jack Gardner as Skuli
- James Mack as Parson
- Bert Sprotte as Marshall
- Bodil Rosing as Mrs.Sandbo
- Bert Starkey

== Production ==
Paramount Pictures originally purchased the film rights to Wild Geese novel shortly after the novel released with William C. deMille producing it. However, the deal fell though and the rights ended up with Tiffany Pictures.

== Preservation ==
With no prints of Wild Geese located in any film archives, it is a lost film.

== See also ==
- The Cry of the Wild Geese (1961)
