= Georges Bossé =

Canadian politician

Georges Bossé (born November 5, 1943) is a retired politician in the Canadian province of Quebec. He was the mayor of Verdun from 1993 until its amalgamation into the city of Montreal in 2001 and subsequently served as a Montreal city councillor and member of the Montreal executive committee (i.e., the municipal cabinet).

== Private life and early political career ==
Bossé owned a jewelry store in Verdun before entering political life and was at one time chair of the Verdun General Hospital.

He first ran for mayor of Verdun in the 1985 municipal election, in which he was narrowly defeated by former Liberal member of parliament Raymond Savard. During this campaign, Bossé promised to revitalize the city's shopping streets and increase its cultural activities without a significant tax hike; a report in the Montreal Gazette indicated that he spent the maximum amount of money permitted for the campaign, hired a public relations consultant, and had his supporters pack Verdun council meetings during the buildup to the vote. One of the key issues in this election was the proposed amalgamation of Verdun into Montreal, which both Bossé and Savard opposed. Bossé's Parti d'action municipale (Municipal Action Party) won six out of the twelve seats on council, but it did not remain united as a party after election; at least five of the party's councillors later joined Savard's rival Regroupement des citoyens de Verdun (Verdun Citizens' Movement).

A longtime member of the Quebec Liberal Party, Bossé planned to contest the 1989 provincial election under its banner for the Verdun electoral division. He was blocked by the party establishment, which selected Henri-François Gautrin as a parachute candidate in the seat.

== Mayor of Verdun ==
=== First term ===
Bossé ran for mayor of Verdun a second time in the 1993 municipal election and, on this occasion, defeated Savard by a significant margin. Eight sitting councillors joined his revitalized Parti d'action municipale in the buildup to the campaign, and the party won all thirteen council seats on election day. During this campaign, Bossé promised to reduce the tax rate, improve police protection, provide credits for housing renovation, and give Verdun a greater voice in the Montreal Urban Community (MUC).

As mayor, Bossé attempted to overturn Verdun's long-standing prohibition laws, in which customers were not permitted to order alcohol at public establishments without also ordering food. He was ultimately not successful; Verdun remained "dry" until 2010. He did, however, succeed in opening sidewalk spaces to restaurants, cafés, and some other vendors in 1994. On the level of administration, he established five new committees to oversee administration, urban development, the environment, public works, and recreation.

By virtue of serving as mayor of Verdun, Bossé automatically had a seat on the Montreal Urban Community. He was chosen as vice-chair of the Conference of Suburban Mayors not long after the election and was also named as head of the Intermunicipal Waste Management Board in December 1995.

=== Second term ===
Bossé was re-elected in the 1997 municipal election, defeating two independent candidates. On this occasion, the Parti d'action municipale fell to six seats in a reduced ten-member council; the other four seats were won by independents.

Bossé's second term in office was marked by conflict with the city's blue-collar workers, represented by the Canadian Union of Public Employees (CUPE) Local 302. An acrimonious strike began on October 1, 1998, after the city attempted to reduce the number of municipal workers and introduce greater flexibility in job assignments. The labour dispute lasted for more than a year, during which time the city used its own management officials as strikebreakers. An agreement was finally reached to resolve the strike in February 2000.

In January 1998, Bossé succeeded Westmount mayor Peter Trent as head of the Conference of Suburban Mayors (later renamed as the Union of Suburban Mayors). In this capacity, Bossé introduced a plan to reform the MUC by giving more responsibility to the office of general manager while reducing the power of the chair. An editorial in the Gazette noted that this plan would have had the effect of weakening the MUC's powers, an outcome that the suburban mayors desired. The reforms were never approved, and the question became moot in light of subsequent events. In March 1998, Bossé was one of eleven MUC members to vote against Vera Danyluk's re-election as chair.

Following its re-election with a majority government in the 1998 Quebec provincial election, the Parti Québécois government of Lucien Bouchard announced plans to amalgamate the twenty-nine municipalities on Montreal Island. The province's initial plan was to create three new cities (representing the eastern, central, and western zones of the island), but this was later superseded by a plan to amalgamate the entire island into a single municipality. Bossé and other suburban mayors vocally opposed these plans, with Bossé on one occasion saying that mergers "were not, are not, and never will be the solution to the problems of the metropolitan region." Bossé later briefly offered support in principle for a plan, proposed by provincial advisor Louis Bernard, to create one city divided into twenty-seven boroughs. This notwithstanding, he ultimately opposed the government's final strategy for amalgamation (which included the creation of boroughs) and led a public protest against the merger in December 2000.

Despite the opposition of Bossé and others, the island of Montreal was amalgamated into a single municipality in 2001. There was some speculation that Bossé would run for mayor of the new city as a representative of suburban interests, though he ultimately declined to do so and was instead among the first elected officials to support the campaign of Gérald Tremblay.

Bossé was one of three Montreal-area elected officials who served on Montréal International during this period, along with Montreal mayor Pierre Bourque and Dorval mayor Peter Yeomans. He continued to hold this position after amalgamation. In January 2001, he was appointed to the executive of the Montreal Metropolitan Community, a successor to the MUC.

== Montreal city councillor ==
Bossé was elected to Montreal city council in the 2001 municipal election as a candidate of Tremblay's Montreal Island Citizens Union (MICU), leading the polls in the multi-member division of Verdun; the other two successful candidates were also MICU candidates. Across the city, Tremblay was elected mayor and MICU won a majority of seats on council. By virtue of his election to city council, Bossé also served on the newly created Verdun borough council and, following the election, he was selected as its inaugural chair (a position that was later restyled as borough mayor).

In November 2001, Tremblay appointed Bossé as a member of the Montreal executive committee with responsibility for economic development. During Montreal's first post-merger tax reassessment in 2003, he argued that the city should have more power to set variable tax rates. In late 2003, he co-hosted a gathering of Hollywood producers and studio executives in Montreal in a bid to promote the city's film industry.

Bossé was appointed in April 2003 to head a task force charged with decentralizing municipal services to Montreal's boroughs. Notwithstanding his previous opposition to amalgamation, he was by this time an opponent of de-merger efforts, saying that the context had fundamentally changed. It was reported later in the year that Bossé was among the executive members most strongly urging Tremblay to grant taxation rights and greater legal status to the boroughs.

Following a reshuffle of Tremblay's executive committee in January 2004, Bossé was named chair of a new committee on territorial development, cultural and heritage, with further responsibilities for special projects, para-municipal societies and downtown Montreal. He was given further responsibility for public security in August 2004, ceding responsibility for cultural and heritage at around the same time.

Bossé suggested in February 2005 that Montreal could swear in its metro agents as constables in order to give them the power to carry out arrests. The following month, he served on a committee that selected the largely unknown Yvon Delorme as Montreal's new chief of police. In October 2005, he completed negotiations that allowed volunteer firefighters who had lost their jobs as a result of amalgamation to join the Montreal fire department.

There were rumours in 2002 that the Action démocratique du Québec party had approached Bossé about running under its banner in the next provincial election. Bossé declined to comment. Ultimately, this candidacy did not occur. He did not seek re-election to city council in the 2005 election, in part because of lingering opposition to amalgamation among his electorate.

== Since 2005 ==
Soon after leaving city hall, Bossé became vice-president of DAA Strategies and, in this capacity, worked as an urban planning consultant for the company Devimco on a major development project in Griffintown. The timing of this arrangement was controversial, in light of Bossé's recent membership on the executive committee and Devimco's extensive business dealings with the city. He also served as president of a restoration committee for the Notre-Dame-des-Sept-Douleurs church.

Following the revelations of municipal corruption by the Charbonneau Commission that led to Tremblay's resignation as mayor in late 2012, Bossé questioned the need for Montreal to have municipal political parties.

== Electoral record ==
2001 Montreal municipal election: Councillor, Verdun (three members elected)
Party	Candidate	Votes	%	±%
Citizens Union	Georges Bossé	11,415	19.42	
Citizens Union	Laurent Dugas	9,001	15.31	
Citizens Union	Claude Trudel	8,540	14.53	
Vision Montreal	Danielle Paiement	7,593	12.92	
Vision Montreal	Robert Isabelle	7,577	12.89	
Vision Montreal	Micheline Senécal	7,377	12.55	
Independent	Catherine Chauvin	4,843	8.24	
Independent	Pierre Labrosse	1,641	2.79	
White Elephant	Daniel Racicot	786	1.34	
Total valid votes		58,773	100	–
Source: Election results, 1833-2005 (in French), City of Montreal.

1997 Verdun municipal election: Mayor of Verdun
Party	Candidate	Votes	%	±%
Parti d'action municipale	Georges Bossé (incumbent)	9,735	67.89	
Independent	Marcel Henley	3,906	27.24	
Independent	Aimé Pinette	698	4.87	
Total valid votes		14,339	100	–
Source: "Results from races for mayor, council" Montreal Gazette, 3 November 1997, A6.

1993 Verdun municipal election: Mayor of Verdun
Party	Candidate	Votes	%	±%
Parti d'action municipale	Georges Bossé	13,831	65.30	
Regroupement des Citoyens de Verdun	Raymond Savard (incumbent)	5,550	26.20	
S.O.S. Taxes Verdun	Edmond Vigneau	1,801	8.50	
Total valid votes		21,182	100	–
Source: "Incumbents all re-elected in Montreal East voting," Montreal Gazette, 9 November 1993, A6.

1985 Verdun municipal election: Mayor of Verdun
Party	Candidate	Votes	%	±%
Regroupement des Citoyens de Verdun	Raymond Savard	8,232	33.57	
Parti d'action municipale	Georges Bossé	7,987	32.57	
Parti de l'Unité de Verdun	Robert Liboiron	4,886	19.92	
Parti contre l'annexion de Verdun	Maurice Trudeau	2,372	9.67	
Independent	Eddy Vigneau	708	2.89	
Parti civique de Verdun	Robert Mailhot	337	1.37	
Total valid votes		24,522	100	–
Source: "Final results for Verdun, Hudson, Montreal East," Montreal Gazette, 5 November 1985, A6.
