= Wild Geese (novel) =

1925 Canadian novel by Martha Ostenso

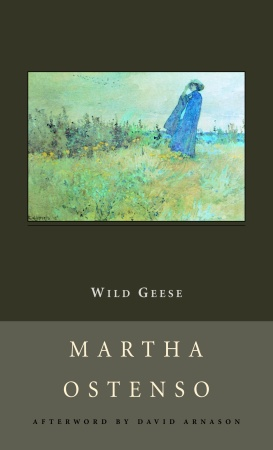
- 1989 Edition cover
- Author: Martha Ostenso
- Cover artist: C.W. Jefferys
- Language: English
- Genre: Historical novel, Naturalism
- Publisher: Dodd, Mead and Company (1925), McClelland and Stewart (1961-2008)
- Publication date: 1925
- Publication place: Canada
- Media type: Print (Paperback)
- Pages: 356 pp (1925 Edition)
- ISBN: 978-0-7710-9394-4

Wild Geese is a Canadian novel of the historical fiction genre written by the author Martha Ostenso, first published in 1925 by Dodd, Mead and Company. The story is set on the prairies of Manitoba, Canada in the 1920s. The novel details characters struggling against victimization to achieve a better life and follow their respective passions. Although the novel is primarily a realist novel, it does contain naturalist themes, especially in the subject of comparing Canadian wild geese to the progression of time and the inevitability of fate, as well as pathetic fallacy elements.

== Summary ==
Lind Archer, a teacher from the city, has come to the Gare farm to stay while she teaches in the nearby school. As she continues to learn about life in the country, she begins to realize the plight of the family she is staying with. The strict Caleb Gare uses blackmail and punishment to get what he wants, but how secure is his position? When the young Mark Jordan, the son of his wife with another man, arrives, he tries even harder to retain control over the family. With all of his machinations failing around him, Caleb is quickly losing control over his family and consequently, over his farm.

== Characters ==
=== The Gare family ===
Caleb is one of the wealthiest farmers in the area, although he is quite cheap. His greatest possession is his flax field, which he adores in an almost sexual manner. Caleb is very strict and blackmails several characters throughout the novel.

Amelia is Caleb's wife. She is quite detached from her children because they are also the children of her nemesis, Caleb Gare. She previously had a child out of wedlock with Del Jordan before she married Caleb.

Judith is one of the main characters of the book. She is a young adult who is constantly described as having 'vigorous beauty'. She is in a relationship with Sven Sandbo.

Martin is one of Caleb's sons.

Ellen is Martin's twin sister.

Charlie is Caleb's favourite son.

=== Other main characters ===
Lind Archer is the main character of the novel. She is a teacher who is staying with the Gare Family. Lind is from a city and is in a relationship with Mark Jordan.

Mark Jordan is the child of Amelia Gare and Del Jordan. He does not know who his real parents are. He is under the illusion that his parents are English immigrants. He believes his father was a scholar who died before he was born and his mother died just after his birth.

Sven Sandbo is the love interest of Judith Gare.

=== Minor characters ===
Thorvald Thorvaldson

Fusi Aronson lived to the south of the Gare family, his land contained the muskeg which he sold to Caleb.

Bjarnasson Family A clan who lived to the westward, they are Icelandic. They have the best fishing sites.

Skuli Erickson Best mate of Caleb and the other trustee of the school alongside Caleb.

Malcolm, also called Goat-Eyes. Has Scottish and Cree ancestry. Love interest of Ellen Gare. He previously worked on the Gare family farm.

Anton Klovacz owns a farm that he leaves in the care of Mark Jordan while he goes to Nykerk to see a doctor about his emaciation.

Del Jordan was Amelia Gares' love interest in the past. He was gored to death by a bull.

== Themes and symbols ==
There are several themes and symbols displayed throughout the novel, some of which are shown here.

=== Loneliness ===
Lonesome feelings are depicted several times by different characters. Some characters, such as Mark Jordan and Lind Archer, are drawn together by each other's loneliness and are the characters which feel most out of place as they are not from the rural area.

=== Isolation ===
The Gare children are very isolated from the rest of the world. Their father keeps them on his farm and does not allow them to travel farther than the neighbouring town.

=== Wild geese ===
As the namesake of the novel, the symbols associates with several meanings. A few times, a lone wild goose depicts the loneliness that several characters are feeling. As a flock, they are the representation of the passage of time.

== Film adaptations ==
- Wild Geese (1927)
- The Cry of the Wild Geese (Austria, 1961)
- After the Harvest (2001, TV film)
