= Consequence =

Consequence may refer to:

== Philosophy, science and social sciences ==
- Logical consequence, also known as a consequence relation, or entailment
- Consequent, in logic, the second half of a hypothetical proposition or consequences
- Consequentialism, a theory in philosophy in which the morality of an act is determined by its effects
- Unintended consequences
- Consequence, in operant conditioning, a result of some behavior

== Film and television ==
=== Films ===
- Anjaam (English: Consequence), a 1994 Hindi film
- Consequence, a 2003 film directed by Anthony Hickox
- The Consequence (Die Konsequenz), a 1977 West German film
- Consequences (1918 film), a British silent comedy film
- Consequences (2018 film), a Slovenian drama film

=== Television episodes ===
- "Consequences" (8 Simple Rules), 2004
- "Consequences" (Buffy the Vampire Slayer), 1999
- "Consequences" (CSI: NY), 2006
- "Consequences" (Most Beautiful Thing), 2019 (the series is also known as Girls from Ipanema)
- "Consequences" (Static Shock), 2003

== Games ==
- Consequences (game), a parlour game

== Literature ==
- Consequences (novel), a 1919 novel by E. M. Delafield
- "Consequences" (Cather story), a 1915 short story by Willa Cather
- "Consequences" (Kipling story), an 1888 short story by Rudyard Kipling

== Music ==
- Consequence (website), a music website
- Consequence (rapper) (born 1977), American rapper
- Consequent phrase, in music theory, the second half of a period

=== Albums ===
- Consequence (album), by Jackie McLean, or the title track, 2005
- Consequences (Dave Burrell album), 2006
- Consequences (Endwell album) or the title song, 2009
- Consequences (Godley & Creme album), 1977
- Consequences (Joan Armatrading album) or the title song, 2021
- Consequences (The Missionary Position album), 2012
- Consequences (New York Contemporary Five album) or the title track, 1963
- Consequences (Peter Hammill album), 2012
- ConSequences (Raphe Malik album), 1999

=== Songs ===
- "Consequence", by the Notwist from Neon Golden, 2002
- "The Consequence", by You Me At Six from Hold Me Down, 2010
- "Consequences" (song), by Camila Cabello, 2018
- "Consequences", by Lovejoy from Wake Up & It's Over, 2023
- "Consequences", by Years & Years from Night Call, 2022
