= Douglas Durkin =

Canadian writer (1884–1967)

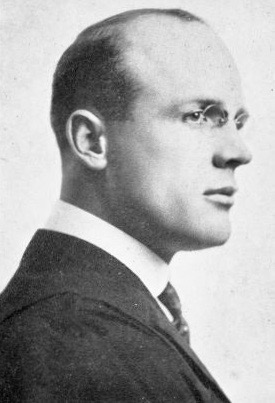
- Born: 9 July 1884; Parry Sound, Ontario, Canada
- Died: 4 June 1967 (aged 82); Seattle, Washington, United States
- Occupations: Writer, Poet
- Writing career
- Pen name: Conrad North
- Notable work: The Magpie

Douglas Durkin (9 July 1884 – 4 June 1967) was a Canadian novelist, short story writer and screenwriter.

== Biography ==
Douglas Leader Durkin was born in Parry Sound, Ontario, Canada, but moved with his family to Swan River, Manitoba, during his youth. He worked as a professor of English literature at Brandon College and the University of Manitoba between 1911 and 1921, when he moved to New York City, leaving behind his wife and children. He taught creative writing briefly at Columbia University before turning to a full-time writing career with fellow-novelist Martha Ostenso. Durkin and Ostenso married in 1945, after the death of his first wife, and lived together, first in New York and later in Minnesota, until Ostenso's death in 1963. Durkin died in Seattle, Washington, in 1967.

Durkin is best known for his 1923 novel The Magpie, set during the Winnipeg General Strike and dealing with issues of worker's rights. It is considered a valuable contribution to the emergence of realism in Canada, particularly prairie realism.

Durkin is also known for his relationship with Ostenso. Durkin and Osteno met at the University of Manitoba where she was his student; shortly after Durkin moved to New York, where Ostenso followed him. It has been suggested that Durkin contributed significantly to Ostenso's first novel, Wild Geese (1925), a fact that was kept secret because Wild Geese won the 1925 Dodd, Mead and Company Best Novel of the Year Award, which could only be awarded to first-time novelists.

In 1958, at the end of their writing careers, Ostenso and Durkin signed a legal agreement stating retroactively that every novel published under the name "Martha Ostenso" had in fact been collaboratively written by Ostenso and Durkin. This may account for why Durkin published only one novel after The Magpie, the darkly humorous Mr. Gumble Sits Up (1930). Durkin did continue to publish short stories under his own name as well as under the pseudonym "Conrad North," a nickname apparently given to him by Ostenso.

== Selected bibliography ==
- The Fighting Men of Canada (1918)
- The Heart of Cherry McBain (1919)
- The Lobstick Trail (1921)
- The Magpie (1923)
- Mr. Gumble Sits Up (1930)
