= The Cry of the Wild Geese =

1961 film

- Directed by: Hans Heinrich
- Written by: Martha Ostenso (novel Wild Geese); Per Schwenzen; Alf Teichs
- Produced by: Rudolf Stering; Alf Teichs
- Starring: Ewald Balser; Heidemarie Hatheyer; Brigitte Horney
- Cinematography: Walter Tuch
- Edited by: Renate Jelinek
- Music by: Rolf A. Wilhelm
- Production companies: Deutsche London-Film; Wiener Mundus-Film
- Distributed by: Transocean-Film; UFA Film Hansa (W. Germany)
- Release date: 22 September 1961
- Running time: 91 minutes
- Country: Austria
- Language: German

The Cry of the Wild Geese (German: Ruf der Wildgänse) is a 1961 Austrian historical drama film directed by Hans Heinrich and starring Ewald Balser, Heidemarie Hatheyer and Brigitte Horney.

The film's sets were designed by the art director Leo Metzenbauer. It was shot at the Rosenhügel Studios in Vienna and on location in Manitoba in Canada.

== Cast ==
- Ewald Balser as Caleb Gare
- Heidemarie Hatheyer as Amelia Gare
- Brigitte Horney as Mrs. Sandbo
- Marisa Mell as Judith Gare
- Horst Janson as Sven Sandbo
- Gertraud Jesserer as Ellen Gare
- Hans H. Neubert as Mark Jordan

== See also ==
- Wild Geese (1927)

== Bibliography ==
- Bock, Hans-Michael & Bergfelder, Tim. The Concise CineGraph. Encyclopedia of German Cinema. Berghahn Books, 2009.
