= Mrs Henry de la Pasture =

English writer (1866–1945)

Lady Clifford CBE
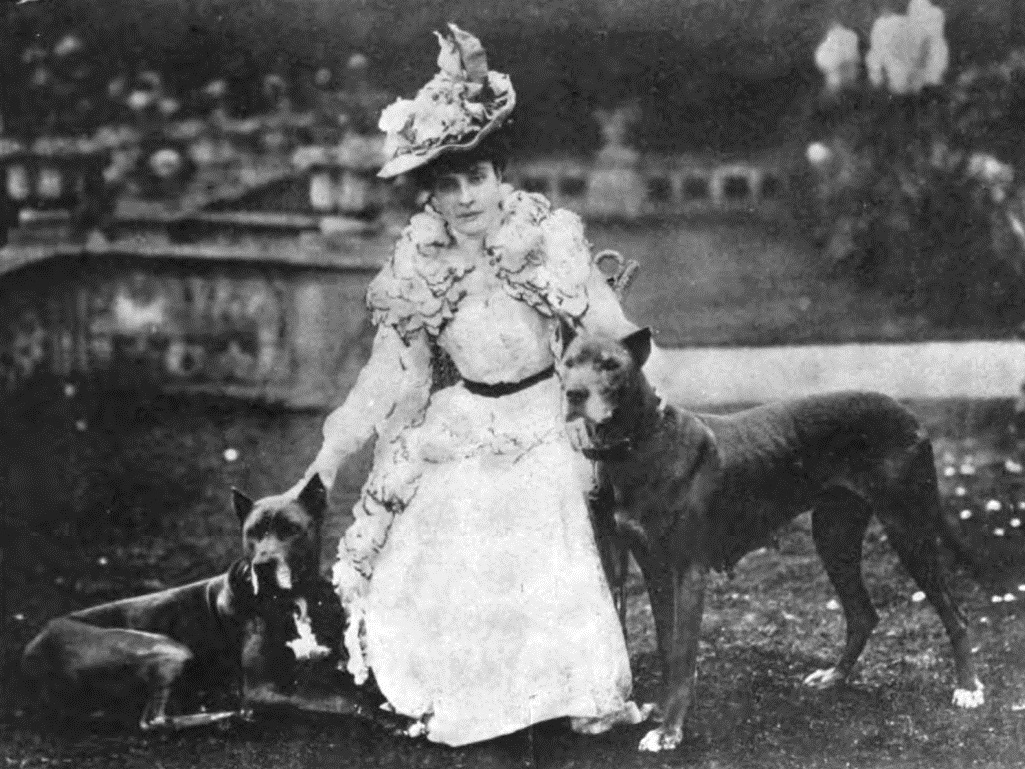
- Mrs Henry de la Pasture
- Born: Elizabeth Lydia Rosabelle Bonham; 1866; Naples, Italy
- Died: 30 October 1945 (aged 78–79); England
- Occupations: Novelist, dramatist, children's writer
- Spouses: Henry Philip Ducarel de la Pasture (m. 1887; died 1908) Sir Hugh Clifford (m. 1910; died 1941)
- Children: E. M. Delafield; Yoé

Elizabeth Lydia Rosabelle, Lady Clifford CBE (née Bonham, formerly de la Pasture; 1866 – 30 October 1945), known as Mrs Henry de la Pasture, was an English novelist, dramatist and children's writer. Her children's novel The Unlucky Family has been called a classic of its genre.

== Biography ==
She was born Elizabeth Lydia Rosabelle Bonham in Naples, daughter of Edward Bonham of Bramling, Kent, a British consul.

A Roman Catholic, she married, in 1887, Henry Philip Ducarel de la Pasture of Llandogo Priory, Monmouthshire. The couple moved to Aldrington, near Hove, when Edmée, the elder of their two daughters was born in 1890. Edmée was known by the pseudonym E. M. Delafield (married name Edmée Dashwood) and authored the Provincial Lady series, but predeceased her mother in 1943, whom she failed to mention in her Who's Who entry. The younger daughter, Yolande (Yoé) Friedl, was a medical doctor, who died in London in 1976.

Her first marriage ended in 1908 with the death of her husband. Two years later she married Sir Hugh Clifford, a colonial administrator and a friend of the novelist Joseph Conrad, with whom she lived between 1912 and 1929 successively in the Gold Coast (where she edited an album in 1908), Nigeria, Ceylon and Singapore. He ended his career as Governor of the Straits Settlements. In 1918, she was appointed a CBE.

== Works ==
=== Fiction ===
Extra titles and information:

- The Little Squire (1893). Children's novel, later dramatised
- A Toy Tragedy (1894). Children's novel, translated as Jeanne, la petit mère by Bl. de Méry, 1914
- Deborah of Tod's (1897). Later dramatised, reprinted 1898 and 1908
- Adam Grigson (1899). Reprinted 1908
- Catherine of Calais (1901). Reprinted 1907
- Cornelius (1903). Reprinted 1909
- Peter's Mother (1905). Dramatised and acted at Sandringham by royal command in 1906, reprinted 1906, 1907 and 1912
- The Lonely Lady of Grosvenor Square (1906). Reprinted 1907 and 1909
- The Unlucky Family (1907). Children's novel, reprinted 1908, 1946, 1980 and 1988. In his 1980 preface Auberon Waugh called it "one of the great classics of its genre".
- The Grey Knight: An Autumn Love Story (1908)
- Catherine's Child (1908)
- The Tyrant (1909). Reprinted 1910
- Master Christopher (1911)
- Erica (1912). Entitled The Honorable Mrs. Garry for the 1912 Canadian and 1913 American editions
- Michael Ferrys (1913). Entitled Michael for the American edition

=== Plays ===
- The Man from America (1905). Sentimental comedy
- The Lonely Millionaires (1905)
- Her Grace the Reformer (1907)
