= 1997 Quebec municipal elections =

Several municipalities in the Canadian province of Quebec held municipal elections to elect mayors and councillors on November 2, 1997. The most closely watched contest was in Quebec City, where incumbent mayor Jean-Paul L'Allier was re-elected, although his supporters lost control of city council to the Civic Progress Party.

== Results ==
=== Verdun ===
Party colours have been randomly chosen and do not indicate affiliation with or resemblance to any municipal, provincial, or federal party.

Electoral District	Position	Total valid votes	Candidates	
Electoral District	Position	Total valid votes	Parti d'action municipale	Independents
	Mayor	14,339	Georges Bossé (incumbent); 9,735 (67.89%)	Marcel Henley; 3,906 (27.24%); Aimé Pinette; 698 (4.87%)
District 1	City councillor	1,468	Lucie Chevrier; 637 (43.39%)	Catherine Chauvin; 831 (56.61%)
District 2	City councillor	1,333	Marvin Reisler (incumbent); 508 (38.11%)	Robert Isabelle; 825 (61.89%)
District 3	City councillor	1,386	Alain Tassé (incumbent); 656 (47.33%)	Ernie Chiasson; 730 (52.67%)
District 4	City councillor	1,544	Ginette Patry (incumbent); 682 (44.17%)	Robert Fillatrault; 862 (55.83%)
District 5	City councillor	1,636	Danielle Mimeault (incumbent); 900 (55.01%)	Jean-Paul Belisle; 736 (44.99%)
District 6	City councillor	-	Laurent Dugas (incumbent) acclaimed	
District 7	City councillor	1,360	Nicole Santiere (incumbent); 991 (72.87%)	Sylvain Lefort; 369 (27.13%)
District 8	City councillor	1,447	France Lecocq (incumbent); 934 (64.55%)	Jean-Pierre Chalifoux; 513 (35.45%)
District 9	City councillor	1,571	Claude Ravary (incumbent); 885 (56.33%)	Abbe D'Amico; 477 (30.36%); Réal Moses; 209 (13.30%)
District 10	City councillor	1,681	John Gallagher (incumbent); 1,016 (60.44%)	Daniel Jutras; 665 (39.56%)

Source: "Results from races for mayor, council," Montreal Gazette 3 November 1997, A6.
