= Potton, Quebec =

Potton
- Township municipality
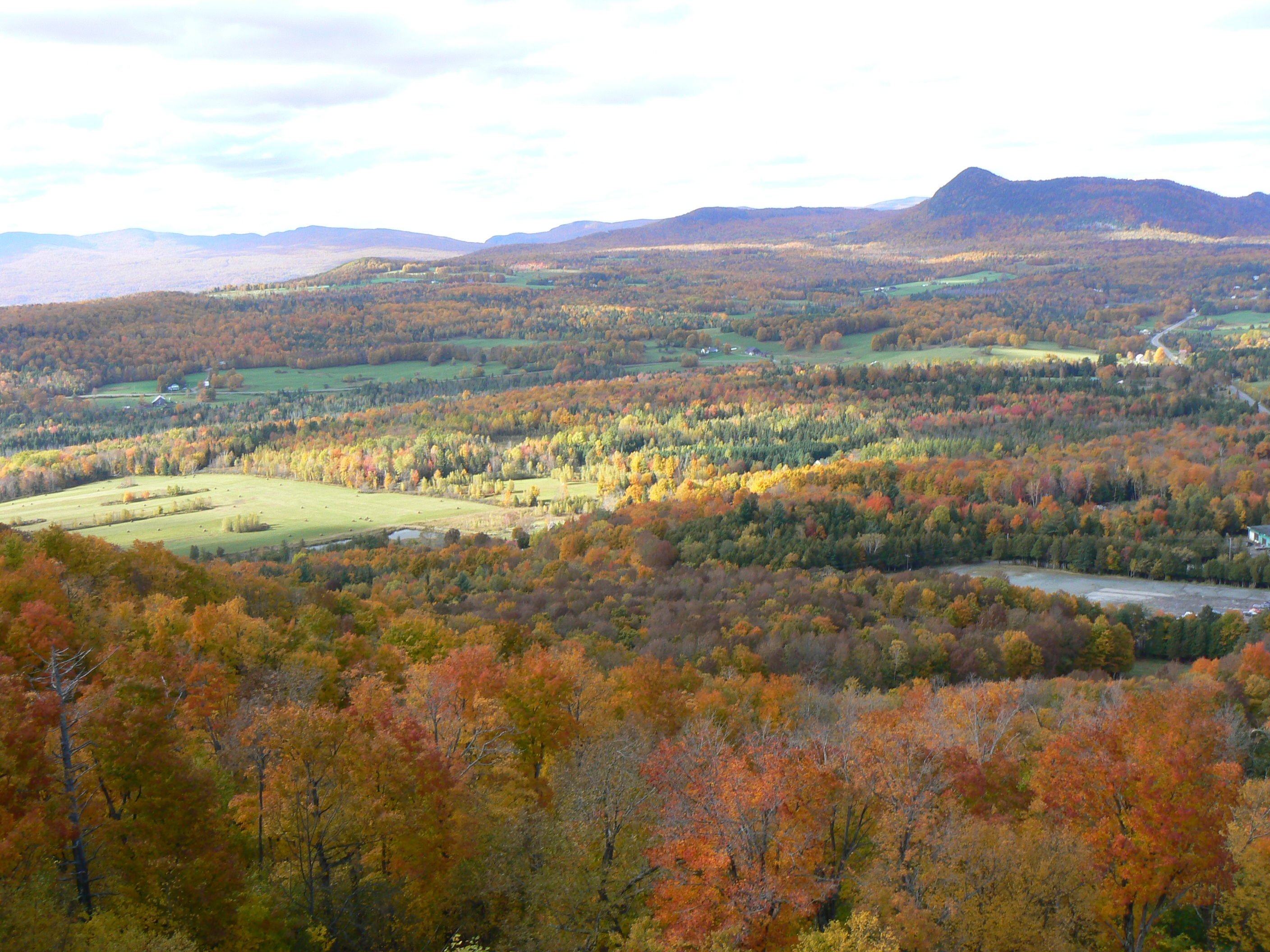
- Motto: "Ille Terrarum Mihi Omnis Angulus Ridet" (Latin for, "This little corner of the world smiles at me above all")
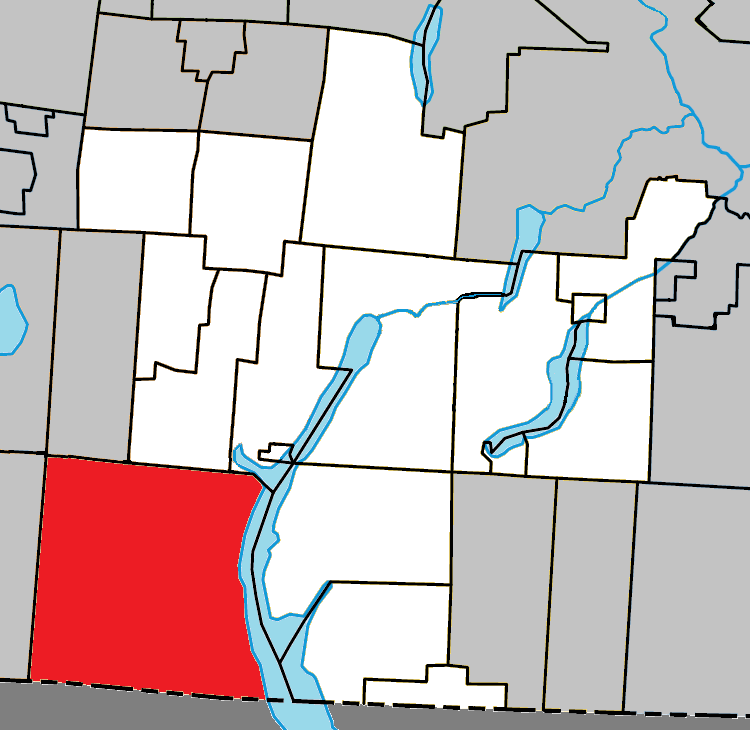
- Location within Memphrémagog RCM

- Location in southern Quebec
- Coordinates: 45°05′N 72°22′W
- Country: Canada
- Province: Quebec
- Region: Estrie
- RCM: Memphrémagog
- Constituted: July 1, 1855
- Named for: Potton

Government
  - Mayor: Bruno Côté
  - Federal riding: Brome—Missisquoi
  - Prov. riding: Orford

Area
  - Total: 278.60 km^{2} (107.57 sq mi)
  - Land: 260.77 km^{2} (100.68 sq mi)

Population (2021)
  - Total: 2,012
  - Density: 7.7/km^{2} (20/sq mi)
  - Pop 2016-2021: ▲8.6%
  - Dwellings: 1,965
- Time zone: UTC−5 (EST)
  - Summer (DST): UTC−4 (EDT)
- Postal code(s): J0E 1X0
- Area codes: 450 and 579
- Highways: R-243
- Website: www.potton.ca

Potton is a township municipality of about 2,500 people in the Memphrémagog Regional County Municipality. It is located on the western shore of Lake Memphremagog in the Estrie (Eastern Townships) region of Quebec, and is one of the municipalities in Brome County. Potton is located about 125 kilometres (78 mi) southeast of Montreal, 30 kilometres (19 mi) to the southwest of the city of Magog, and next to the United States border, north of North Troy, Vermont.

Potton Township (Canton de Potton) consists of several villages and hamlets that include Potton Springs, Mansonville, Highwater, Dunkin, Province Hill, Leadville, Vale Perkins, Perkins Landing, and Knowlton's Landing.

Of these, Mansonville is the business center and the seat of government (Municipalite du canton de Potton) for the township. Formerly a sleepy community, Mansonville has experienced some growth and prosperity because of its proximity to the Owl's Head ski resort. Like many Eastern Townships and New England villages, Mansonville grew up around a water-powered mill which exploited a head of water above a fall on the North Branch of the Missisquoi River. The mill ceased operating with electrification in the early 20th century, which allowed economies of scale and centralized manufacturing in larger centres. It operated as a feed and grain mill until 2004, when it was destroyed by fire. Overlooking the mill site is the mansion of the Manson family that founded the town. The mansion has since become a bed and breakfast.

The Newport Subdivision of the Central Maine and Quebec Railway railroad (a subsidiary of the Canadian Pacific Railway) route from Newport, Vermont to Richford, Vermont traverses the township at Highwater and follows the Mississquoi River.

The single runway Mansonville Airport (CSK4) is located near Highwater, on chemin de l'Aeroport.

Mansonville, like many Eastern Townships communities, has long had a mixture of French and English-speaking residents and is home to over twenty nationalities and ethnic groups. Religious diversity is present, and in Mansonville, Roman Catholic, United (closed 2011) and Anglican churches are located a few yards apart. Mansonville was also the home of Russian Orthodox prelate Metropolitan Vitaly Ustinov for some five decades until his death in 2006.

== History ==
The area encompassed by the township is part of the larger territory originally inhabited by the Abenaki tribe. There are no known permanent Abenaki habitation sites in the township. The area was used by them for hunting and fishing. Lake Memphremagog and the Missisquoi River were important trade and travel routes. Perkins Landing (approx. 45.092447, -72.295008) is considered to be one end of the portage from Lake Memphremagog to the Missisquoi River. A number of place names originate from them:

- Owl's Head is the English name for the mountain called "Walowadjo". From the Abenaki language, "walo" translates as "saw-whet owl" (Aegolius acadicus); "wadjo" translates as "mountain".
- Owl's Head was also called "Waloimudupsek": "walo" translates as "saw-whet owl" (Aegolius acadicus); "imudups" translates as "head"; "ek" translates as "location".
- Memphremagog comes from the word "Memrahabegek", which means "where there is a big expanse of water".
- Memphremagog was also pronounced as "Mamphremagog". This came from the Abenakis "Mamlawbagak" which signifies "a long and large sheet of water". The prefix "mamlaw" denotes largeness or abundance; the particule "baga" denotes water; and "k" marks the name as given in local term.
- Missisquoi comes from the word "Masipskoik", which means "a place where there are boulders", more specifically "boulders point".
- Missisquoi also comes from the Abenakis "Masipskoik" which means "where there is flint".

The Eastern Townships of Quebec were opened for settlement by the Constitutional Act of 1791. The first European settler in Potton township was Nicholas Austin. He was a Loyalist from Somersworth, New Hampshire who in 1791 settled at the site of present-day Perkins Landing. Due to a navigation error, he moved, in 1793, north to Bolton Township to the land that was allocated to him. The town of Austin bears his name. Austin's log house at Perkins Landing was assumed by Samuel Perkins in 1793. Other early settlers of Potton Township were David Blanchard, Col. Henry Ruiter, Moses Elkins, and the Perkins, Manson, Gilman, and Coit families. The names of the early settlers remain in the toponymy of the township: Ruiter's Brook in Dunkin, Vale Perkins, Perkins Landing, Mansonville, and Knowlton's Landing.

Potton Township was proclaimed on October 31, 1797. It, and the homonymous municipality township erected in 1845, derive their name from the town of Potton in England, located in Bedfordshire, near the village of Sutton.

Perkins Landing and Knowlton's Landing were regular stops for the steamships that plied Lake Memphremagog from the latter half of the 19th century up to the mid-20th century. The first of these steamships was the Mountain Maid, the Lady of the Lake was the largest, and the last was the Anthemis. The wharves at these locations now provide public access to the lake.

Two lighthouses were located on the shore of Lake Memphremagog. They were built in 1878 and no longer exist.

- Chateau de Silva Lighthouse, located roughly midway between Knowlton's Landing and Perkins Landing,
- Lead Mines Lighthouse, located near Leadville, at the foot of Mount Owl's Head.

The covered bridge crossing Mud Creek was listed as a cultural heritage site in 2008. The bridge was built in 1896 and is of the "Town Simple" type.

A round barn, built in 1911 for Robert Jersey, is situated in Mansonville. The structure and site were listed as a cultural heritage site in 2009.

Highwater was the site of the Space Research Corporation where Gerald Bull performed ballistics research.

Portions of the 1998 movie "Free Money" were filmed in Vale Perkins, Highwater, Mansonville, and near Mount Owl's Head.

Some exterior scenes for the third season of the Quebec police thriller La Faille (2022) were filmed in Mansonville on September 21 and 22, 2021. The town hall served as the site of the series town "Applegrove" police station. The closed Restaurant Soleil Rouge served as the series establishment "Chez Karen". Other scenes were filmed on Rue des Pins, Rue Principale, and in Parc Mansonville. The episodes were aired in November 2022 on Club Illico.

== Geography ==
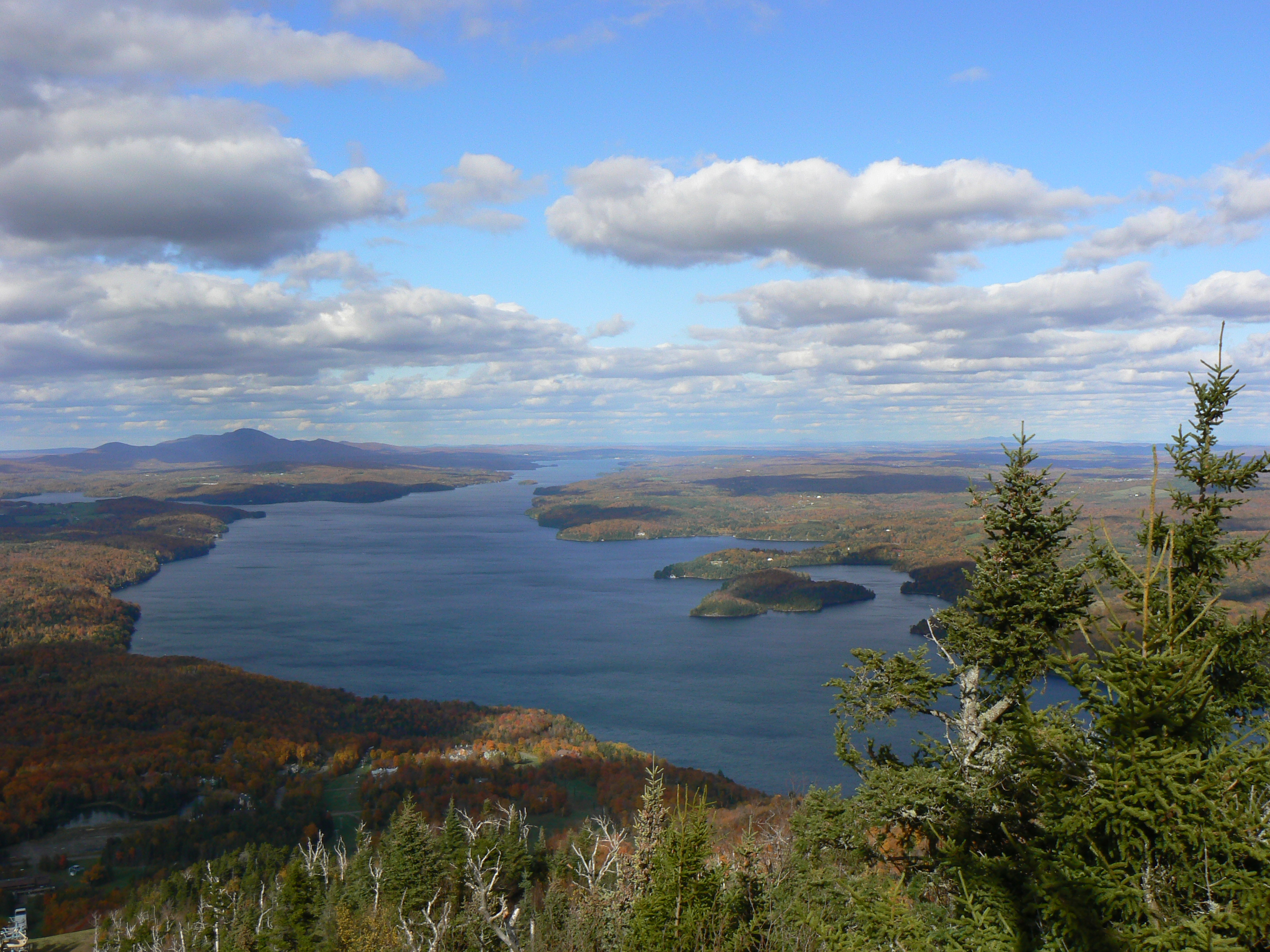
View of Lac Memphrémagog from Owl's Head ski hill near Mansonville, Eastern Townships, Quebec, October 2009

The eastern boundary of the township is the western half of Lake Memphremagog. The southern boundary is the international border with the United States of America. The western boundary is formed by the Sutton Mountains.

The elevation of Lake Memphremagog is 682 feet (208 m). The maximum recorded depth is 351 feet (107 m), which is located north of Mount Owl's Head and between Perkins Landing and Knowltons Landing, opposite Jewett Point (at approximately 45.111621°N 72.278491°W).

The territory of the township is traversed by the north to south flow of the North Branch of the Missisquoi River. It confluences in Highwater with the South Branch of the Missisquoi River, forming the Missisquoi River which disembogues into Lake Champlain at Missisquoi Bay.

The township is dotted with many mountains. Among the more prominent peaks are:

- Peewee, with a height of 647 metres (2,123 ft) and located at 45.1485°N 72.3379°W
- Elephantis (also called Elephantus), with a height of 658 metres (2,159 ft) and located at 45.1204°N 72.3279°W
- Hog's Back, with a height of 533 metres (1,749 ft) and located at 45.1383°N 72.3140°W
- Owl's Head, with a height of 747 metres (2,451 ft) and located at 45.0636°N 72.2994°W
- Hawk, with a height of 536 metres (1,759 ft) and located at 45.0135°N 72.3325°W
- Bear, with a height of 668 metres (2,192 ft) and located at 45.0188°N 72.2969°W

Potton is well known for the many sugar bushes that produce maple syrup, considered among the most remarkable in the Quebec.

== Geology and soils ==
Most of the bedrock underlying the township is Cambrian-era slate, schist, phyllite, greywacke and quartzite. There are bands of ultramafic rock near the Missisquoi River valley, and basalt also occurs. Quaternary glaciation left deposits of stony loam till plus outwash deposits of sand and gravel. Benchlands overlooking the Missisquoi River commonly have deposits of clay loam. Brown podzolic and podzol profile developments are most common.

The area is also rich in talc. For many years the Baker Talc company operated underground mining and open-pit operations in South Bolton, with a plant in Highwater. The mine and plant are inactive.

Other inactive mines include a copper mine on the northwestern slope of Hog's Back and a lead mine in Leadville.

== Demographics ==
In the 2021 Census of Population conducted by Statistics Canada, Potton had a population of 2,012 living in 1,027 of its 1,965 total private dwellings, a change of 8.6% from its 2016 population of 1,852. With a land area of 260.77 km^{2} (100.68 sq mi), it had a population density of 7.7/km^{2} (20.0/sq mi) in 2021.

Population trend:

Census	Population	Change (%)
2021	2,012	▲8.6%
2016	1,852	▲0.2%
2011	1,849	▲3.3%
2006	1,790	▲2.8%
2001	1,741	▲3.0%
1996	1,690	▲5.4%
1991	1,603	N/A

Mother tongue (2011)

Language	Population	Pct (%)
French only	930	50.5%
English only	785	42.7%
Both English and French	25	1.4%
Other languages	100	5.4%

== Coat of arms ==
The township received a Grant of Arms on March 25, 1992. Among the symbols on the arms are:

- five peaks, representing the five main mountains in Potton
- blue wavy lines, representing the many waterways, ponds, and the lake
- the sun, representing the bright future of Potton
- a crown, symbolizing Quebec and Canada
- the latticework of the covered bridge across Mud Creek
- a deer, representing the deer and other wildlife that are abundant in the area
- the motto "Ille Terrarum Mihi Omnis Angulus Ridet" ("This small corner of the world smiles at me above all").

== See also ==
- List of anglophone communities in Quebec
- List of township municipalities in Quebec
