= Consequences (novel) =

1919 novel by E. M. Delafield

Consequences by E. M. Delafield is a 1919 novel about a young woman entering a convent. Its heroine, Alex Clare, refuses to marry the only young man to make her an offer of marriage, and, finding herself regarded as a failure by society, must resort to convent life. E. M. Delafield herself entered a convent for a year, though was able to find freedom through working in a VAD. Alex is not afforded such emancipation and her tale ends tragically as a result. After the departure of the much-adored Mother Gertrude, Alex drowns herself in the bathing pond at Hampstead Heath.

Consequences was republished in 2000 by Persephone Books.
