= Mont Owl's Head =

Mountain and ski resort in Quebec, Canada

Owl's Head
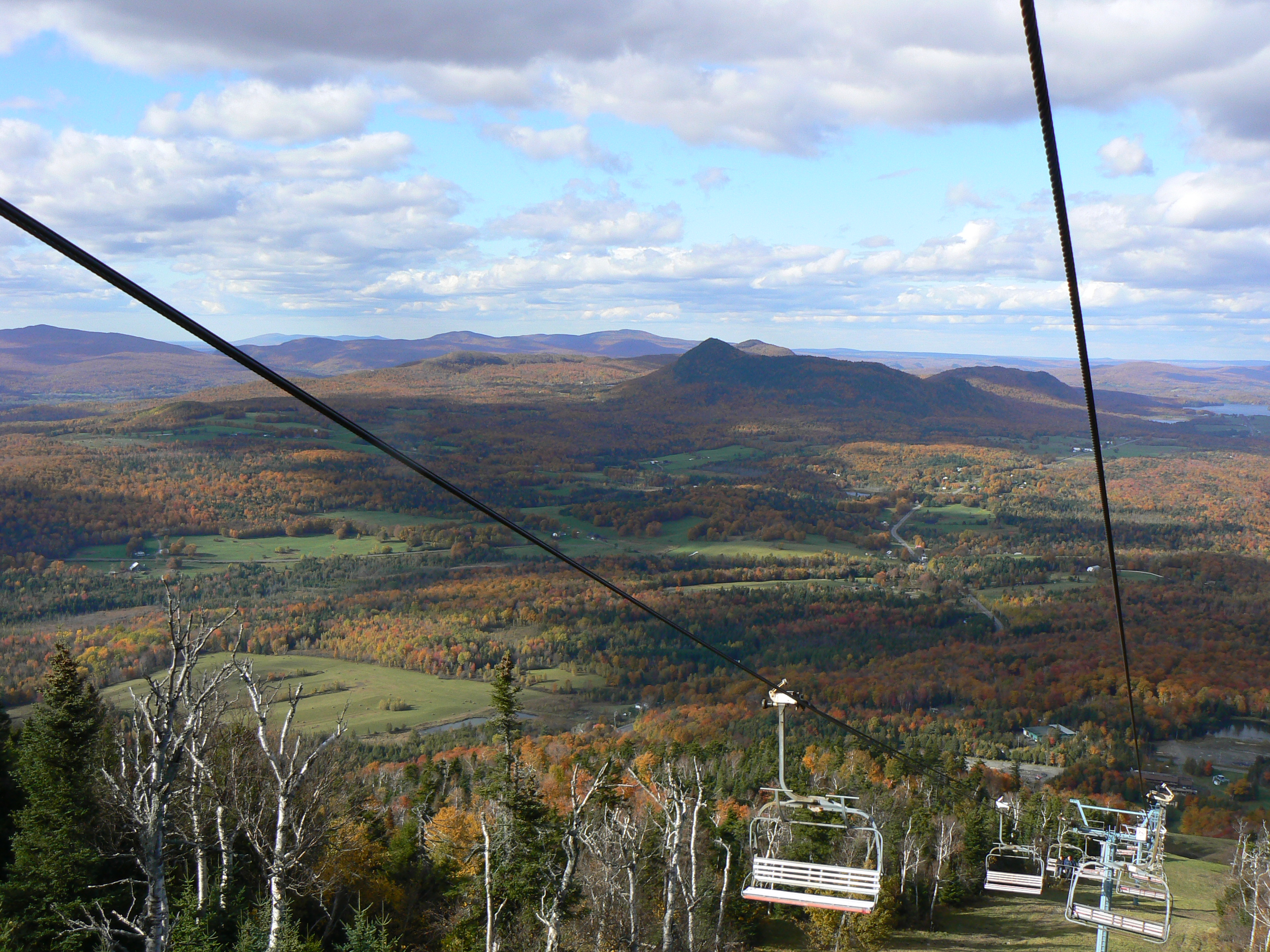
- Interactive map of Owl's Head
- Location: Potton, Quebec, Canada
- Nearest city: Sherbrooke
- Coordinates: 45°04′27″N 72°17′53″W
- Vertical: 540 m (1,770 ft)
- Top elevation: 756 m (2,480 ft)
- Base elevation: 216 m (709 ft)
- Skiable area: 163 acres (66 ha)
- Trails: 50 total 30% Easy; 40% Intermediate; 30% Difficult
- Lift system: 6 total 2 detachable quads 2 fixed quads 1 double 1 carpet
- Lift capacity: 14,500 skiers/hr
- Terrain parks: yes
- Snowmaking: 90%
- Night skiing: no
- Website: owlshead.com/en/

Mont Owl's Head is a mountain in Potton, Quebec, in the Eastern Townships of Quebec, Canada. The mountain has a height of 747 metres (2,451 ft).

A ski area, with the same name, was developed on it by Fred Korman and opened in 1965 with 3 lifts (2 chairlifts and 1 t-bar) and 6 runs.

== See also ==
- List of ski areas and resorts in Canada
