= Faye Hammill =

Fellow of the Royal Society of Edinburgh, professor of modern literature

Faye Hammill FRSE
- Occupation: Professor of English literature
- Employer: University of Glasgow
- Known for: modern North American and British middlebrow literature research
- Awards: 2003 - Pierre Savard Award; 2010 - European Society for the Study of English biannual book prize in English Literature; 2011 - Young Academy of Scotland; 2021 - Fellow of the Royal Society of Edinburgh

Faye Hammill FRSE is a professor in the University of Glasgow, specialising in North American and British modern writing in the first half of the twentieth century, what is often called "middlebrow". Her recent focus is ocean liners in literature. She is a Fellow of the Royal Society of Edinburgh (2021).

== Education and career ==
Hammill graduated with a First Class degree in English Language & Literature with French from the University of Birmingham (1995) and completed her doctorate four years later in Canadian Literature. She lectured in English for three years at Liverpool University, and then spent five years at Cardiff University, becoming senior lecturer in 2006. Moving to Glasgow, Hammill taught English at Strathclyde University for ten years, becoming professor in 2011, and part-time Deputy Associate Principal (Research) in 2016.

Since 2017, she has been professor in English Literature in the School of Critical Studies at the University of Glasgow, and has served on research assessment and peer review groups, as keynote speakers at conferences and published books and other academic research.

== Research and publications ==
Her comparative literature research covered well known publications, such as Cold Comfort Farm, and Anne of Green Gables, the 1934 film version of the latter she said glossed over the character's "loss, rejection, cruel authority figures, and loneliness", and that the character of Anne Shirley had "overshadowed that of her creator." Hammill has also written about the "Great American Novel" contender, Gentlemen Prefer Blondes. One of her areas of interest in 2002, whilst at Cardiff, was also Canadian literary reviews considering the idea of nature and the "Gothic". In 2007, when Hammill was at Strathclyde, she wrote about her research examining literary women and writing between the wars, and the notion of celebrity.

She began the AHRC Middlebrow Network in 2008, which has grown to 400 members. Her international collaboration on Canadian magazines and writing on travel, also grew with a joint project with the Canadian Writing Research Collaboratory in 2011, and a book titled Magazines, Travel and Middlebrow Culture published with Michelle Smith, in 2015. Her work studying middlebrow culture looked further at the impact of publications like Vanity Fair (1914–36); American Mercury (1924–81); New Yorker (1925– ); Esquire (1933– ) in a chapter written with Karen Leick in Oxford University Press publication Modernism and the Quality Magazines. The Canadian Social Sciences and Humanities Research Council, in 2015, funded a "Modern Magazines project" with Hammill, Hannah McGregor, and Paul Hjartarson, publishing their key findings in the Canadian academic journal English Studies in Canada and in the Journal of Modern Periodical Studies. The previous year she had given a keynote lecture for ACCUTE at the Congress of the Humanities and Social Sciences (Brock University, Canada).

Hammill won a mid-career Fellowship from the British Academy (2015) on Noël Coward and attitudes to print culture or popularity. In 2018, she gave a keynote lecture at the "Big Magazines" conference (Aix-Marseille Université, France) In 2019, the University of Glasgow awarded her a Research Culture Award, for her work in mentoring and supporting early career researchers.

=== Ocean liners and literature ===
Hammill's most recent focus has been on the role of ocean liners in modern literature. She has been asked to speak at conferences and events across the country, and internationally. For example, in 2018 at the V&A Museum Ocean Liners Conference; at Nottingham Trent University Periodicals and Print Culture Research Group (2020); at a King's College London 2020 event titled The Frantic Atlantic: Ocean Liners in the Interwar Literary Imagination; invited as keynote speaker on "A business man's dream": Promoting/Narrating the RMS Queen Mary at the International Postgraduate Port and Maritime Studies Network Belfast conference (2020); and in considering Transatlantic Style: The Ocean Liner and the "International Set" in the second USA Transatlantic Literary Women's series (online 2020).

Hammill has also contributed to telephones in literature (online exhibition) and an English PEN International Women's Day event The Right to Roam: Women and Free Expression.

=== Other selected publications ===
- Literary Culture and Female Authorship in Canada 1760-2000 (2003), - see Awards
- co-editor: Encyclopedia of British Women's Writing, 1900-1950 (2006)
- Sophistication: A Literary and Cultural History (2010) described as 'smart and capacious' - see Awards
- Modernism's Print Cultures (2016) - with Mark Hussey
- co-editor of the Palgrave series: Material Modernisms
- Introduction, new edition Margaret Kennedy's 1941 Where Stands a Wingèd Sentry (2021)
- editor, new edition Martha Ostenso's 1928 The Young May Moon (2022, Borealis Press) Carnegie Trust Research Incentive Grant

=== Current research publications ===
These are published by the University of Glasgow.

== Awards ==
- 2003 - for Literary Culture and Female Authorship in Canada, the International Council for Canadian Studies' Pierre Savard Award.
- 2010 - for Sophistication: A Literary and Cultural History European Society for the Study of English (ESSE)'s biannual book prize in English Literature
- 2011 - Young Academy of Scotland
- 2021 - Fellow of the Royal Society of Edinburgh
- 2021 - Fellow of the English Association

== See also ==
- Stella Gibbons: Cold Comfort Farm
- Lucy Maud Montgomery: Anne of Green Gables; Anne Shirley
- Great American Novel
- Martha Ostenso
