= Laurent Dugas =

Canadian Politician

Laurent Dugas is a former politician in the Canadian province of Quebec. He was a Verdun city councillor from 1985 to 2001 and a Montreal city councillor from 2002 to 2004, following Verdun's amalgamation into Montreal. His career in public life ended following a personal scandal.

== Private career ==
Dugas was an educator at the École secondaire Monseigneur-Richard for thirty years, eventually becoming principal before retiring in 2003. He was also vice-president of a world kite-flying festival for four years.

== Political career ==
Dugas was first elected to the Verdun city council in the 1985 municipal election as a member of the Parti d'action municipale (Municipal Action Party). This party did not remain active after the election, and several councillors including Dugas subsequently crossed over to the governing Regroupement des citoyens de Verdun (Verdun Citizens' Movement). Dugas served on the city's planning committee during his first term and was re-elected in 1989.

The Parti d'action municipale was revitalized in the buildup to the 1993 municipal election; Dugas returned to the party and was re-elected under its banner in both 1993 and 1997. He held several responsibilities in the city, including serving as president of Verdun's sports, recreation, and culture committee for ten years.

Verdun was amalgamated into the city of Montreal in 2001, and Dugas was elected as one of the community's three representatives on the Montreal city council in the 2001 municipal election as a candidate of the Montreal Island Citizens Union (MICU). He was appointed as a delegate to the Montreal Metropolitan Community after the election, and, by virtue of his position on city council, also served on the Verdun borough council. In 2004, he advocated for a new electoral system wherein all of Montreal's city and borough councillors would be elected "at large" in their boroughs rather than in separate electoral divisions (Verdun's three city councillors were elected "at large" in 2001, but most boroughs had separate, single-member divisions). He also advocated in favour of pay increases for borough councillors who did not serve on city council. Before his career ended in scandal, he was the majority leader on council and MICU caucus chair and was considered a rising political star.

== Scandal and downfall ==
In October 2004, Dugas was charged with sexual assault and sexually touching an adolescent under his authority. Both charges stemmed from a single incident the previous year involving a seventeen-year-old boy. Dugas immediately resigned from MICU to sit as an independent. He continued to serve on council until in the 2005 municipal election, in which he was not a candidate. On June 1, 2006, he was acquitted of the sexual assault charge but found guilty of sexual touching; he did not contest the charge and wrote a letter of apology to his victim that was read in court. He received an unconditional discharge from the presiding judge in June 2007, following a joint recommendation from the Crown and defence.

== Electoral record ==
2001 Montreal municipal election: Councillor, Verdun (three members elected)
Party	Candidate	Votes	%	±%
Citizens Union	Georges Bossé	11,415	19.42	
Citizens Union	Laurent Dugas	9,001	15.31	
Citizens Union	Claude Trudel	8,540	14.53	
Vision Montreal	Danielle Paiement	7,593	12.92	
Vision Montreal	Robert Isabelle	7,577	12.89	
Vision Montreal	Micheline Senécal	7,377	12.55	
Independent	Catherine Chauvin	4,843	8.24	
Independent	Pierre Labrosse	1,641	2.79	
White Elephant	Daniel Racicot	786	1.34	
Total valid votes		58,773	100	–
Source: Election results, 1833-2005 (in French), City of Montreal.

1997 Verdun municipal election: Councillor, Division 6
Party	Candidate	Votes	%	±%
Parti d'action municipale	Laurent Dugas (incumbent)	acclaimed	-	
Source: "Results from races for mayor, council" Montreal Gazette, 3 November 1997, A6.

1993 Verdun municipal election: Councillor, Division 7
Party	Candidate	Votes	%	±%
Parti d'action municipale	Laurent Dugas (incumbent)	831	60.88	
Regroupement des Citoyens de Verdun	Denis Gouin	350	35.64	
S.O.S. Taxes Verdun	Andre Tremblay	184	13.48	
Total valid votes		1,365	100	–
Source: "Incumbents all re-elected in Montreal East voting," Montreal Gazette, 9 November 1993, A6.

1989 Verdun municipal election: Councillor, Division 7
Party	Candidate	Votes	%	±%
Regroupement des citoyens de Verdun	Laurent Dugas (incumbent)	elected		
Independent	Spiros Lazaratos	defeated		
Sources: "La liste des candidats," La Presse, 5 November 1989, A7; Élus de Verdun de 1875 à 2005, City of Montreal.

1985 Verdun municipal election: Councillor, Division 6
Party	Candidate	Votes	%	±%
Parti d'action municipale	Laurent Dugas	734	36.98	
Regroupement des Citoyens de Verdun	Jules Provost	433	21.81	
Parti de l'Unité de Verdun	Yvon Bernier (incumbent)	402	20.25	
Parti contre l'annexion de Verdun	Réal Lapierre	372	18.74	
Parti civique de Verdun	Carmen Goedike	44	2.22	
Total valid votes		1,985	100	–
Source: "Final results for Verdun, Hudson, Montreal East," Montreal Gazette, 5 November 1985, A6.
