= Raymond Savard =

Canadian politician (1927–2021)

Member of Parliament for Verdun
- In office May 1977 – November 1984
- Preceded by: Bryce Mackasey
- Succeeded by: Gilbert Chartrand

Mayor of Verdun, Quebec
- In office 1985–1993
- Preceded by: Lucien Caron
- Succeeded by: Georges Bossé

Personal details
- Born: Pierre Raymond Savard; 29 June 1927 Montreal, Quebec, Canada
- Died: 20 July 2021 (aged 94) Verdun, Quebec, Canada
- Party: Liberal Party of Canada
- Profession: businessperson

Pierre Raymond Savard (29 June 1927 – 20 July 2021) was a Liberal party member of the House of Commons of Canada. His career included various business interests including merchandising, administration and store ownership. Savard entered national politics at Quebec's Verdun electoral district following a by-election victory on 24 May 1977. He was re-elected in the 1979 and 1980 federal elections, but defeated in 1984 by Gilbert Chartrand of the Progressive Conservative party. He served in the latter stages of the 30th Canadian Parliament, and for full terms in the 31st and 32nd Canadian Parliaments. He later served as the mayor of Verdun, Quebec from 1985 to 1993. Savard died on 20 July 2021 at the age of 94.
