= Brome County, Quebec =

Former municipal county of Quebec

Brome County, is a historical county of Quebec. It takes its name from the name of a manor in the parish of Barham in Kent, England that was named after the broom plant. It was named by English surveyors. The earliest settlers to this region were brought from New Hampshire by the Quaker leader, Nicholas Austin in the 1790s. The county was formed in 1855 from parts of Stanstead, Shefford and Missisquoi counties. The county is located in the Eastern Townships, one of the 12 regions of Quebec. The county lies in the foothills of the Appalachian Mountains. Its eastern half is rolling countryside while its western half is part of the Richelieu River plains.

The county is roughly an upside-down "L" shape, bound on the south by the Canada–US border (along 45° for 17.5 km from 72° 15′ W in Lake Memphremagog to 72° 41.5′ W), in the east by in part Lake Memphremagog and Stanstead County, in the north by Shefford County (45° 20′ N for 48 km from 72° 15′ W to 72° 52′ W) and in the west by Rouville and Missisquoi counties. The county is divided into five townships, three in the north and two in the south. The townships in the north are, from east to west, the Township of Bolton, the Township of Brome and the Township of Farnham. The southern townships are the Township of Potton in the east and the Township of Sutton in the west. The county seat is Knowlton in the Township of Brome. Notable physical features of the county include Mount Brome in the northwestern corner of the Township of Brome and the much larger Mount Sutton in the Township of Sutton, and Brome Lake in the eastern part of the Township of Brome, which flows into the Yamaska River, site of a famous duck farm. Along Lake Memphremagog in the Township of Potton are three mountains, from north to south, Mount Sugar Loaf, the larger Mount Owl's Head, and Mount Bear. Owl's Head and Sutton are well-known ski hills.

In the early 1980s the county was abolished and the western half was transferred to the new Regional County Municipality of Brome-Missisquoi and the eastern half was transferred to the Regional County Municipality of Memphrémagog. A small part in the northwest were transferred to the Regional County Municipality of La Haute-Yamaska.

== Municipalities ==
- East Bolton
- West Bolton
- Brigham
- Brome
- East Farhnam
- Eastman
- Brome Lake (Knowlton prior to 1971)
- Potton
- Saint-Étienne-de-Bolton
- Sutton
