= Missisquoi =

Missisquoi can mean:

== Places ==
- Missisquoi Bay in Quebec and Vermont
- Missisquoi River, river in Quebec and northern Vermont
  - Missisquoi River North, tributary of the Missisquoi River in Memphrémagog Regional County Municipality, Estrie, Quebec, Canada
    - Petite rivière Missisquoi Nord, tributary of the Missisquoi River North, Estrie, Quebec, Canada
- Missisquoi County, Quebec, former county in Quebec now part of Brome-Missisquoi Regional County Municipality
- Missisquoi (federal electoral district), former Canadian electoral district now known as Brome—Missisquoi
- Missisquoi (provincial electoral district), former Quebec electoral district now merged into Brome-Missisquoi (provincial electoral district)
- Missisquoi Railroad, now part of the Central Vermont Railway
- Missisquoi National Wildlife Refuge in Vermont

== People ==
- Missiquoi, also spelled Missisquoi, a Native American and First Nations tribe from northern Vermont now in southern Quebec and their 17th-century settlement in what is now Swanton, Vermont
- Missisquoi Abenaki Tribe, a state-recognized tribe in Vermont
