= North Yamaska River =

River in Montérégie, Quebec, Canada

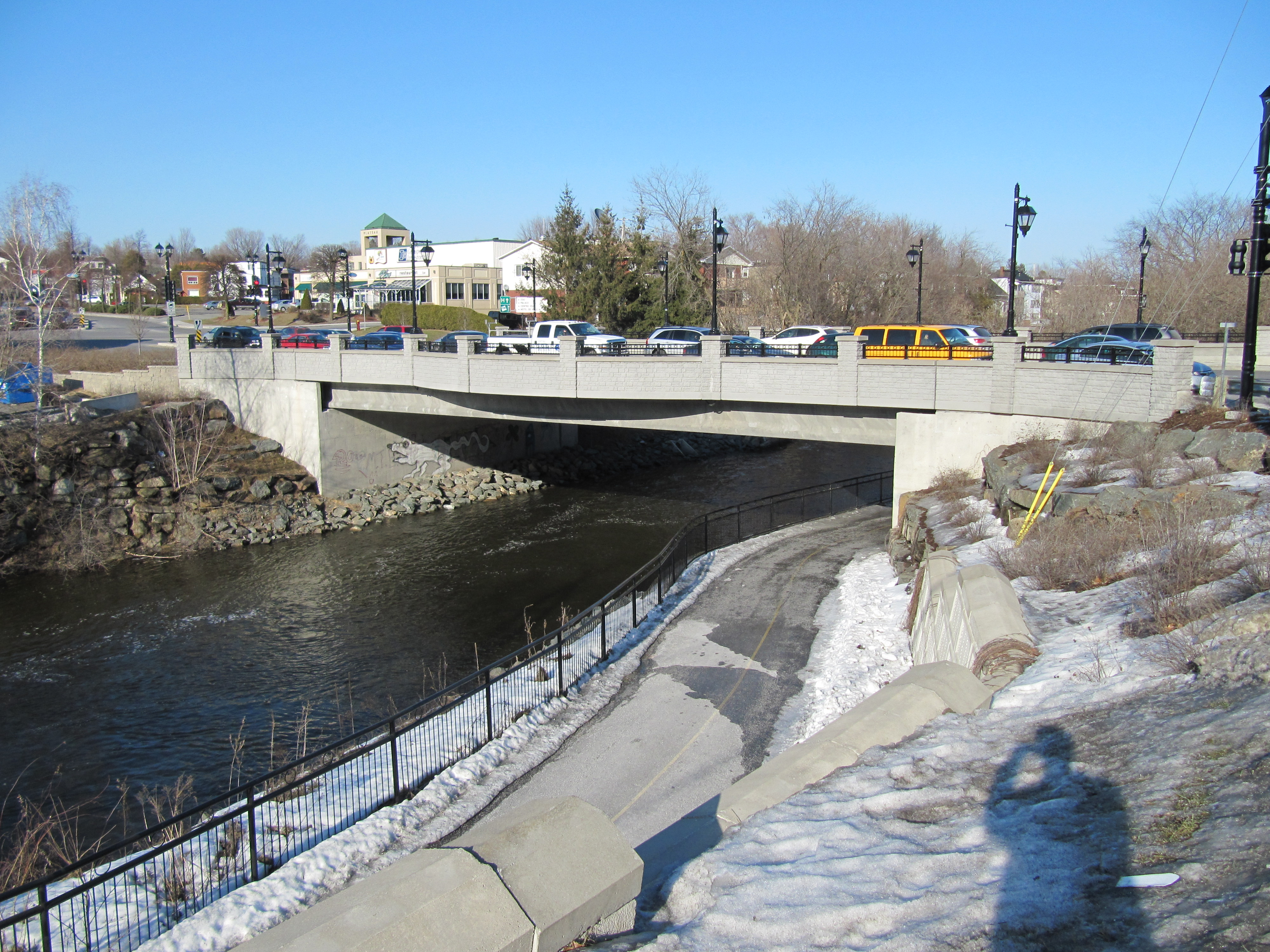
- North Yamaska River downstream from Patrick-Hackett bridge.

- Location within Quebec
- Native name: Rivière Yamaska Nord (French)

Location
- Country: Canada
- Province: Quebec
- Administrative region: Montérégie
- MRC: La Haute-Yamaska Regional County Municipality, Brome-Missisquoi Regional County Municipality

Physical characteristics
- Source: Lac Waterloo
  - location: Waterloo
  - coordinates: 45.342826°N 72.520628°W
  - elevation: 204
- Mouth: Yamaska River
  - location: Brigham
  - coordinates: 45.28889°N 72.85389°W
  - elevation: 73 m
- Length: 47.8 km (29.7 mi)
- Basin size: 303 km^{2} (117 sq mi)

Basin features
- River system: Saint Lawrence River

The North Yamaska river (in French: Rivière Yamaska Nord) is a tributary of the Yamaska river. It flows over 47.8 kilometres (29.7 mi) on the south shore of the Saint Lawrence river in Quebec, Canada and passes through five municipalities, some of them sourcing their fresh water from it.

Like the rest of the Yamaska, it is an important source of life, though urban development, agriculture and industrial uses have had a negative impact on the ecosystem depending on its waters since the colonization of the Eastern Townships.

An awakening in regards to pollution in the North Yamaska has led to an increasing amount of movements such as collective art and eco-friendly action around the river; efforts are noted in local municipalities and their regional county municipalities to alter the impacts of towns and villages on water quality.

== Toponymy ==
The name "North Yamaska River" (officially Rivière Yamaska Nord) dates from December 5, 1968 (after its inscription at the Commission de toponymie du Québec (toponymy commission of Quebec)); it used to be known as rivière de Granby (Granby river) and rivière de Waterloo (Waterloo river).

"Yamaska" can come from Abenaki language and means "there are rushes in the water" or "there is much hay"; these names are a reference to the humid lands of Lavallière bay, where the river's mouth is and the vegetation is abundant. Another possible origin would be Algonquin language "hia muskeg" means "savanna river" or "muddy water river".

This tributary arrives from a northern direction when it merges into the Yamaska river.

== Geography ==
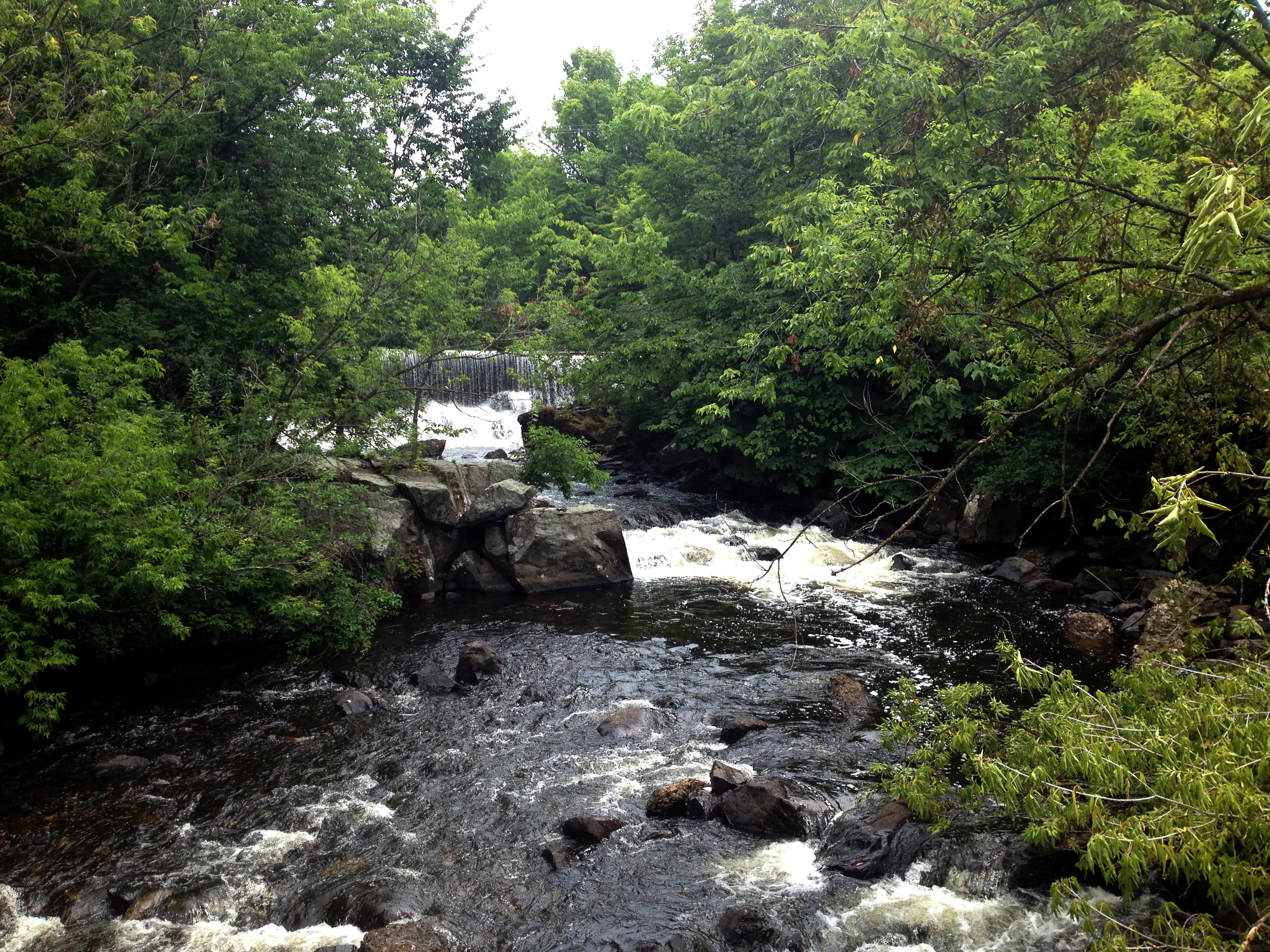
Waterfalls downtown Granby.

=== Hydrography ===
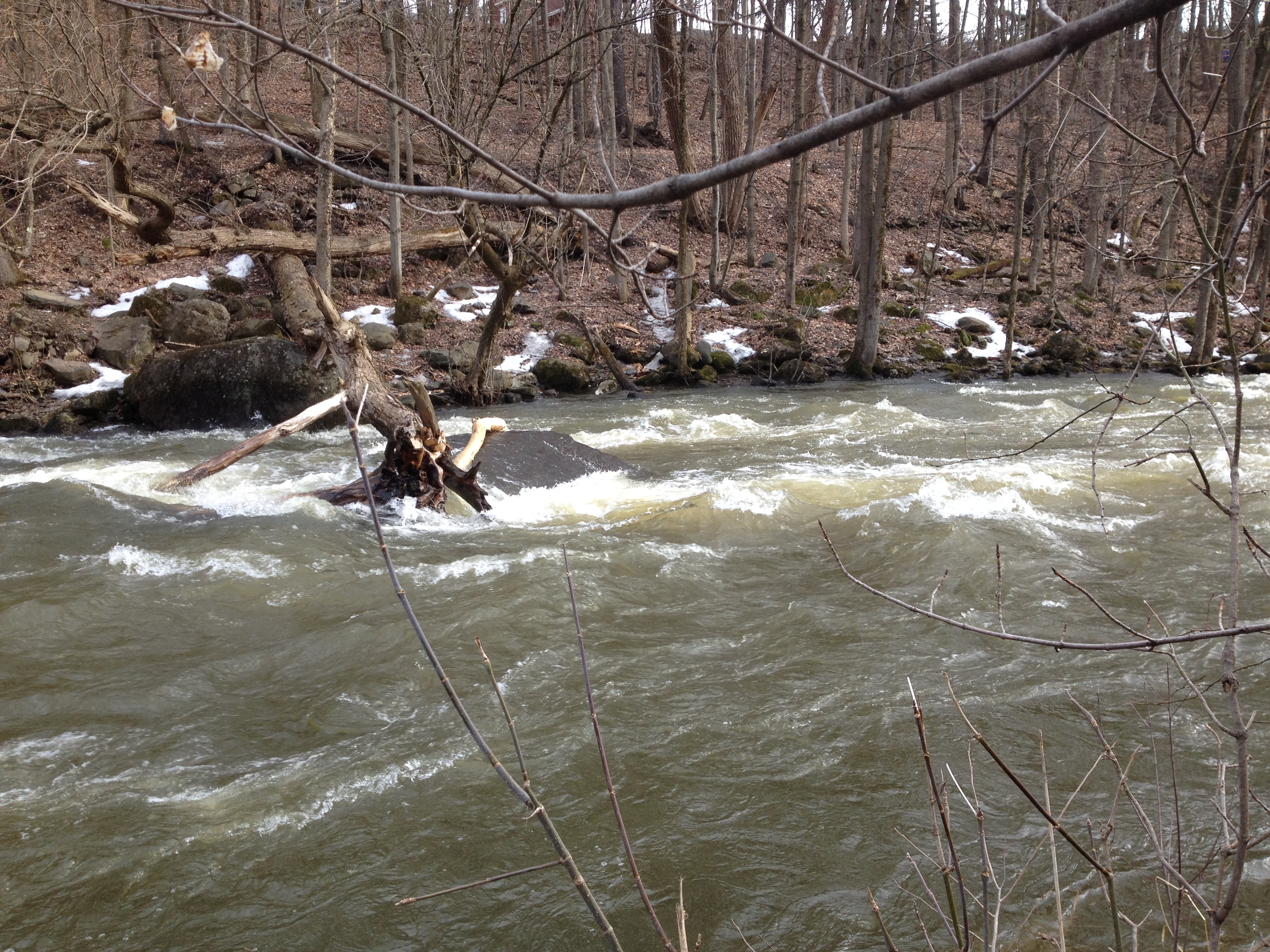
North Yamaska river in the spring.

The drainage basin of this river covers 303 km2 and its average mass flow rate is of 0.59 m³/s, its mass flux increases and diminishes according to seasons. The North Yamaska river's source comes from Waterloo lake (lac Waterloo) (altitude: 204 m), located south of the village of Waterloo; its course forms an arc that goes around mont Shefford on the north side.

=== River's Course ===
==== Superior course of the river (segment of 17 km) ====
From lake Waterloo, the North Yamaska river flows:

- 5,4 km north, gathering the western waters from lac Enchanté and lac des Sources until the village of Warden;
- 1,9 km north until a creek (coming from the east);
- 5,9 km north-west until the end of a bay from Choinière reservoir;
- 3,8 km west crossing the Choinière reservoir (length of 4,9 km; altitude: 143 m).

==== Course from Réservoir Choinière (segment of 30,8 km) ====
From the dam located west of the Choinière reservoir, the North Yamaska flows:

- 7,4 km south-west until a retention basin on the east shore of Lac Boivin (altitude: 110 m);
- 3,5 km south west crossing Lac Boivin, located in the town of Granby;
- 10,0 km south-west crossing Granby until it reaches Autoroute 10 (highway 10);
- 9,9 km south-west in cultivated lands to where its mouth is.
- The North Yamaska river merges into the Yamaska river's north shore near Adamsville and Farnham.

=== Regional County Municipalities and Local Municipalities Crossed ===
La Haute-Yamaska: Waterloo, Saint-Joachim-de-Shefford, Granby, and Saint-Alphonse-de-Granby;

Brome-Missisquoi: Brigham.

== Biodiversity ==
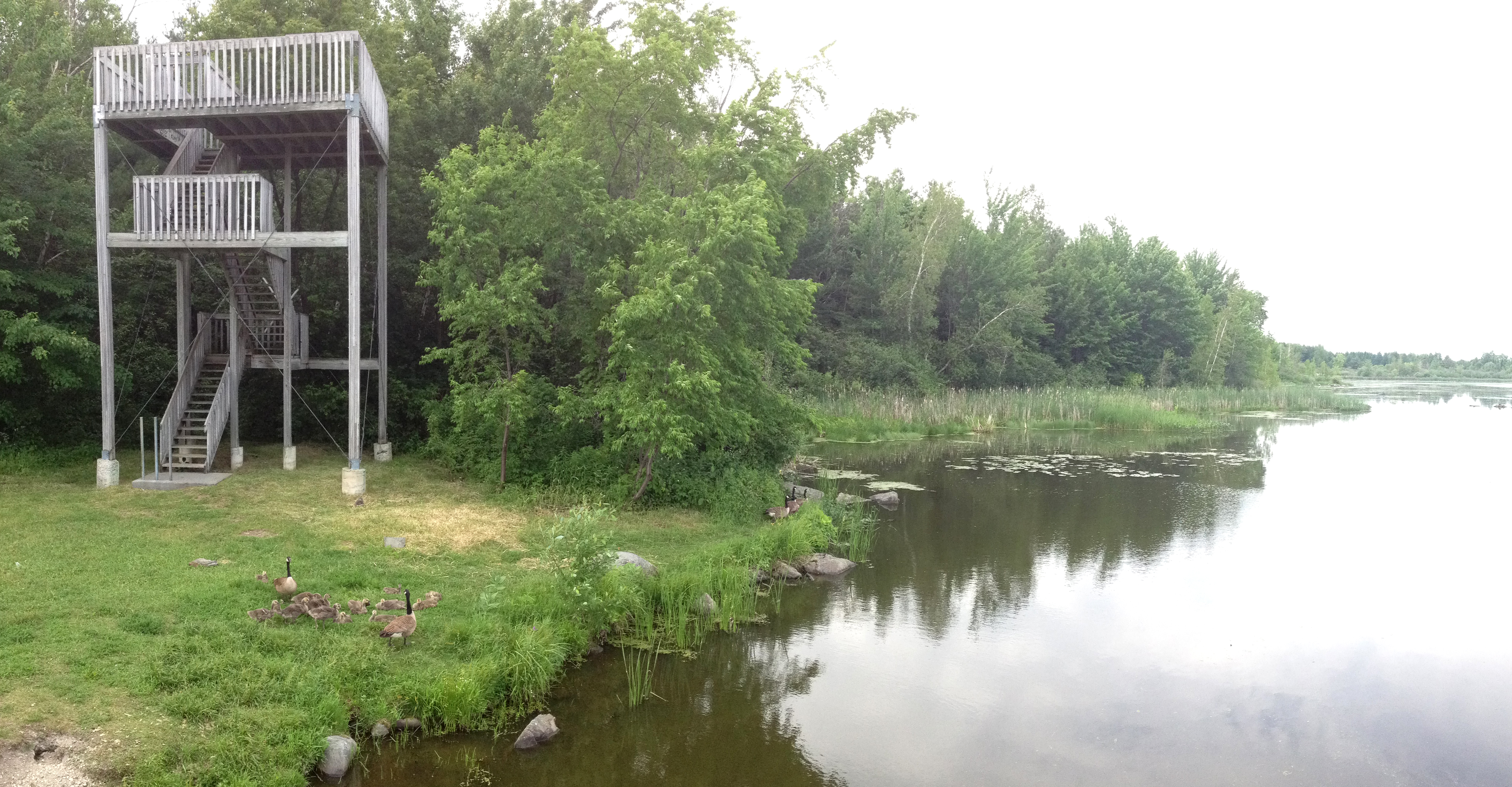
The Yamaska offers splendid sights on nature.

A multitude of creatures and plants of diverse shapes and sizes live within or depend on the North Yamaska river, these vary greatly from one season to the other. Because of its natural richness, the exploitation of this watercourse is common under commercial and recreational forms, in fact, its slow debit, the presence of many species of fish, and the strategic locations of artificial lakes and a national park make it one of the most popular rivers for fishing and tourism in the Eastern Townships; the presence of pollution in the water, mainly because of the use of pesticides and other agricultural runoffs ending in the drainage basin of the Yamaska is problematic for the native species and for citizens who wish to enjoy the nature of the river. To counter the disappearance of species that do not tolerate pollution, the government of Quebec sometimes adds selected fish to the river (and the rest of the Yamaska).

Vegetation surrounding the North Yamaska is mixed, in parts there are trees, marsh plants in others; during winter, a majority of vegetation lays dormant, with the exception of coniferous species. Winter has the number of species reduced, although easier to observe since trees are bared. In the spring, hibernating species reappear and migratory birds return; they remain until fall and are very active around the river.

=== Ichthyological studies ===
A few samples of species where conducted in the North Yamaska river in 1995 and 2003 by the Ministry of Sustainable Development, Environment and Parks, others were made in 1998 or 1999 by the Minister of Natural Resources and Fauna, this allowed the creation of a list of 33 fish that live in its waters.

- Largemouth bass (Micropterus salmoides)
- Smallmouth bass (Micropterus dolomieu)
- Brown bullhead (Ameiurus nebulosus)
- Chain pickerel (Esox niger)
- Common carp (Cyprinus carpio)
- Silver redhorse (Moxostoma anisurum)
- Shorthead redhorse (Moxostoma macrolepidotum)
- Rock bass (Ambloplites rupestris)
- Pumpkinseed (Lepomis gibbosus)
- Common logperch (Percina caprodes)
- Northern pike (Esox lucius)
- Fathead minnow (Pimephales promelas)
- Bluntnose minnow (Pimephales notatus)
- Spottail shiner (Notropis hudsonius)
- Rosyface shiner (Notropis rubellus)
- Spotfin shiner (Cyprinella spiloptera)
- Eastern silvery minnow (Hybognathus regius)
- Emerald shiner (Notropis atherinoides)
- Golden shiner (Notemigonus crysoleucas)
- Sand shiner (Notropis stramineus)
- Mimic shiner (Notropis volucellus)
- White sucker (Catostomus commersonii)
- Creek chub (Semotilus atromaculatus)
- Longnose dace (Rhinichthys cataractae)
- Eastern blacknose dace (Rhinichthys atratulus)
- Brook trout (Salvelinus fontinalis)
- Fallfish (Semotilus corporalis)
- Yellow perch (Perca flavescens)
- Tessellated darter (Etheostoma olmstedi)
- Rainbow trout (Oncorhynchus mykiss)
- Brown trout (Salmo trutt)
- Central mudminnow (Umbra limi)

=== Birdwatching census ===
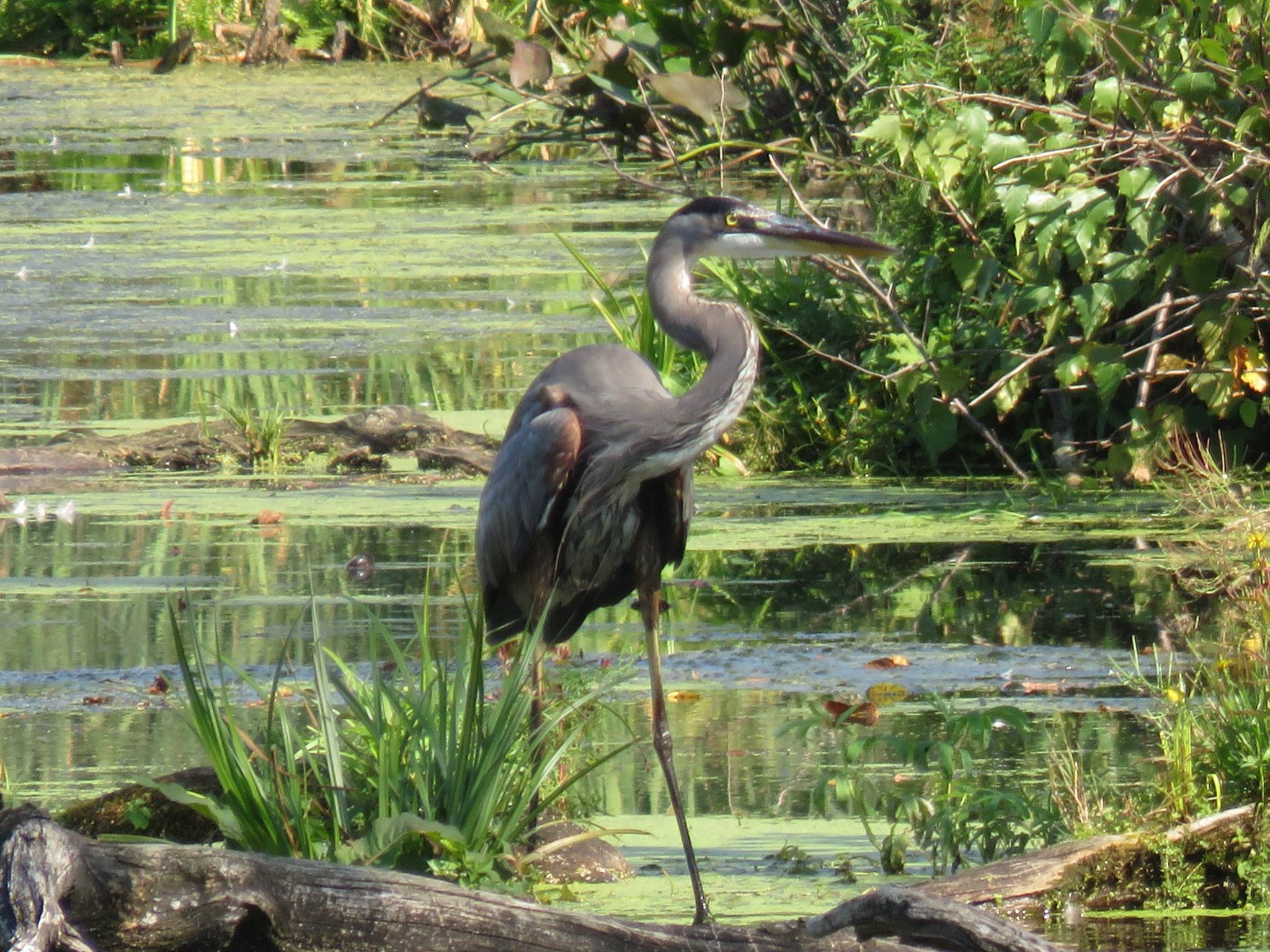
Great Blue Heron in the wetlands surrounding lac Boivin.

Inventories of birds living in Quebec are conducted by ÉPOQ (Étude des populations d'oiseaux du Québec (translates to: study of bird populations of Quebec)); the North Yamaska river being very important for birds because of the vast swamps surrounding Boivin lake and the Yamaska National Park, an interest is given to it and allows for a good source of data based on the observations of the COOHY (Club d'Observateurs d'Oiseaux de la Haute-Yamaska (English: Haute-Yamaska birdwatching club)).

A myriad of species reside there year-round, though a large part migrates southwards in the autumn, only to return in the spring. The presence of the watercourse means that many aquatic species thrive there; among these, some of the most impressive and common are the great blue heron, the double-crested cormorant, and the Canada goose. Water often means insects will gather in large amounts, many birds live by the waterside for its abundance of food.

=== Mammals ===
Mink, beaver, and muskrat are the three main mammals to inhabit the waters of the North Yamaska river, but most land species find themselves drinking from it or hunting amphibians or reptile eggs on the banks; among the most common are the striped skunk, raccoon, and white-tailed deer.

== Conservation ==
For many years, citizens of the municipalities that compose the drainage basin of the Yamaska river aim to reduce the negative impact that humans have on nature that depends on it. One can notice a multiplication of community art projects, events and distribution of information on the subject as well as an invitation for people to adopt an eco-friendly lifestyle, a sense of responsibility, and a general appreciation of nature.

=== Efforts in Granby ===
Granby is one of the municipalities that leads direct actions towards the river's health; through public consultations and expert studies regarding the future of lac Boivin, the city also promotes murals with environmental messages on public walls and municipal buildings, forming partnerships with non-profit organizations and cause-sensitive citizens.

=== Art-Yamaska ===
==== Urgence Yamaska ====
Through a visionary project, Atelier 19 art et créativité (translated as Workshop 19 arts and creativity) (a non-profit organization from Granby) conducted a series of workshops on the subject of mural arts and mosaic during which volunteer citizens created two mural artworks on panels, which were hung on the pumping station A-B-C; the placing is appropriate for the station pumps water from the North Yamaska river for drinking water in the town, its proximity to the river, and lake Boivin increase its impact. Urgence Yamaska (Yamaska Emergency) represents a call to help by the river and its inhabitants; La Yamaska, c'est nous (The Yamaska, it is us), is a series of nine panels filled with informative messages on the subject of the river's water and the life that inhabits it. Both artworks were officially presented May 11, 2013 during the annual celebration of the river. The message brought by these murals come from a collective reflection on the subject of the river's health. It is easy to spot the murals from the cycling paths that go around lac Boivin.

==== Qu'es-tu devenu Yamaska? ====
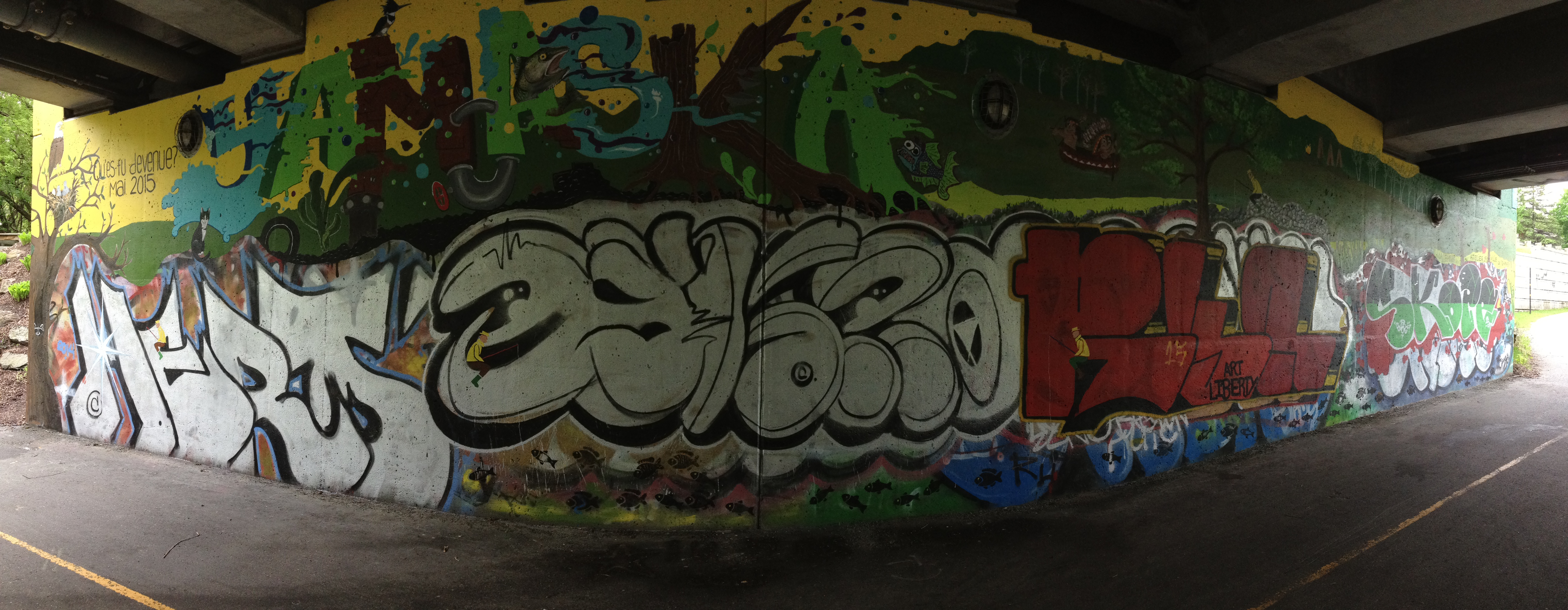
Qu'es-tu devenu Yamaska?

Two years later, the sequel to the Art-Yamaska project happened under Patrick-Hackett bridge, located a bit lower on the North Yamaska, in downtown Granby; this time youth citizens partake in a series of eight workshops given at Centre culturel France-Arbour (France-Arbour cultural center) at Atelier 19, these were on the subject of graffiti art and aimed at the development of a mural with a themed message: environment and habits that are respectful of nature. The bridge's underside is often vandalized, a portion of the illegal art has been kept, while the top and sides were transformed into a unique representation of the Yamaska river. The official title of the mural "Qu'es-tu devenu, Yamaska?" (Yamaska, what have you become?) is hand-painted with a style reminiscing graffiti; it was created by over thirty volunteers of all age groups; the concept of the message comes from a group of youth from the region that have environment at heart.

== See also ==
- List of rivers of Quebec
- Yamaska River
