= Ross McCallum =

Profile
- Positions: Halfback, Tackle

Personal information
- Born: Summer 1930; Missisquoi County, Quebec
- Died: November 27, 2006 (aged 76); Carleton Place, Ontario
- Listed height: 5 ft 11 in (1.80 m)
- Listed weight: 225 lb (102 kg)

Career history
- 1952: Calgary Stampeders
- 1952–1953: Winnipeg Blue Bombers
- 1954: Edmonton Eskimos

Duncan Ross McCallum (1930 – November 27, 2006) was a Canadian professional football player who played for the Calgary Stampeders, Winnipeg Blue Bombers and Edmonton Eskimos.
