= Nicholas Austin =

Nicholas Austin (1736–1821) was one of the first Quakers in the province of Quebec and the founder of a Quaker settlement named Austin in Bolton Township, Brome County, Quebec, "on the west side of Lake Memphremagog in the 1790s".

Nicholas Austin was a fifth generation Quaker from a family of New Hampshire merchants and farmers. He was “chosen as a delegate to the New Hampshire Convention, which ratified the Federal Constitution of the United States. For three years (1789, 1792 and 1793), he was elected town auditor for Middleton, where he had led a fairly comfortable life.”

For some reason that is unclear, perhaps partly in search of religious freedom and partly the promise of thousands of acres of land grants if he could bring settlers with him, Austin sold his holdings in New Hampshire and brought his family to the Eastern Townships of Quebec. He and 53 followers, the majority of whom were American Quakers, "subscribed the Declaration for the Township of Bolton Missisqui Bay 11th day of April 1796".

Though Austin worked hard to clear land, lay roads, and build mills for the new community, things did not work out as planned. The government of the day was hierarchical and corrupt. They expected that Austin could profit by skimming fealty dues from his followers, but the American settlers did not cooperate. Austin could not get promised support from the legislators and courts and never realized the benefits of the settlement scheme. He died in 1821, poor and broken, and was buried in an unmarked grave somewhere in keeping with Quaker custom.

A descendant, Martin Duckworth, has created a movie about his life and its impact: Peaceable Kingdom: A View of Nicholas Austin.

Nothing remains of the Quaker settlements in the Eastern Townships of Quebec today except "a few small Quaker cemeteries; that, and the legacy of a free-thinking, independent faith, embodied by a cupboard full of books" displayed in the Lac-Brome Museum owned by the Brome County Historical Society in Knowlton, Quebec.
