= Lac Boivin =

Artificial lake in Granby, Quebec, Canada

- Aerial view of Lac Boivin

- Location in southern Quebec
- Location: Granby, Quebec, Estrie, Quebec, Canada
- Coordinates: 45°24′05″N 72°41′47″W
- Type: Artificial lake / reservoir
- Primary inflows: North Yamaska River
- Primary outflows: North Yamaska River
- Catchment area: 212 km^{2} (82 sq mi)
- Basin countries: Canada
- Max. length: 2.5 km (1.6 mi)
- Max. width: 0.6 km (0.37 mi)
- Surface area: 1.35 km^{2} (0.52 sq mi)
- Average depth: 1.5 m (4.9 ft)
- Max. depth: 5.5 m (18.0 ft)
- Settlements: Granby

Lac Boivin is an artificial lake on the North Yamaska River in Granby, Quebec, Canada. Its surface area is about 1.35 km^{2} (0.52 sq mi) and its average depth is 1.5 m (4.9 ft). The watershed upstream covers approximately 212 km^{2} (82 sq mi) and includes Lake Waterloo and the Choinière Reservoir.

Damming of the North Yamaska at Granby began in 1815, when water was needed for local mills. Later dams enlarged the pond, and Granby used Lac Boivin as a source of drinking water beginning in 1932. In the 1970s, a proposal to dredge the lake and fill parts of its marsh brought opposition from local naturalists. The marsh was subsequently retained for conservation and interpretation, while recreational development was concentrated elsewhere on the shore. The lake and surrounding wetlands were recognized in 2000 under Canada's Important Bird Area program.

Quebec's lake-monitoring network classified Lac Boivin as eutrophic in 2024.

== Toponymy ==
Lac Henderson and Lac Granby are earlier names for the lake. Lac Boivin was already being used locally in 1967. The Commission de toponymie du Québec made the name official on 22 January 1974. It commemorates Ernest Boivin and his son Horace, both former mayors of Granby. Horace Boivin was also one of the founders of La Voix de l'Est in 1935.

== Geography and hydrology ==
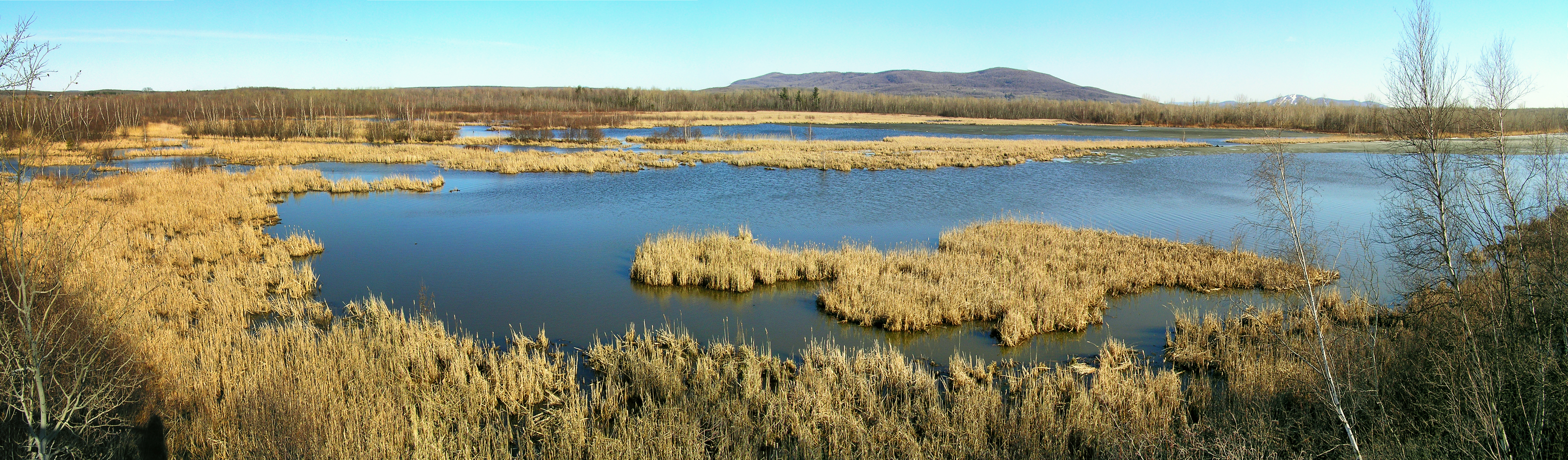
Panorama of Lac Boivin, with Mont Shefford in the background

Lac Boivin is within the urban area of Granby, in the La Haute-Yamaska Regional County Municipality. From southwest to northeast it extends about 2.5 km (1.6 mi); its maximum width is about 600 m (2,000 ft).

Most of the lake is shallow. The average depth is 1.5 m (4.9 ft), but the old channel of the North Yamaska is still visible in the bathymetry and is generally 2 to 3 m (6.6 to 9.8 ft) deep. The maximum recorded depth is about 5.5 m (18.0 ft).

The North Yamaska River enters from the northeast and leaves the lake in Granby. Upstream, its flow is regulated at the Choinière Reservoir in Yamaska National Park. From the Choinière dam, the river runs about 7.4 km (4.6 mi) before reaching the Lac Boivin sector.

Beside the northeastern end of the lake is a smaller pond, roughly 1.2 km (0.75 mi) long and 350 m (1,150 ft) wide. La Granbyenne cycling path crosses between the two on an embankment. Water passes through two openings in the embankment, and marsh occupies much of the shore around the smaller pond

== History ==
=== Dams and early use ===
J. McCarthy's 1801 survey notes describe meadow and forest over much of the area now flooded by Lac Boivin. He recorded a small marsh about 1.5 km (0.93 mi) upstream from the early settlement.

Granby's first dam across the North Yamaska dates from 1815. Sawmills, flour mills, fulling and carding mills and several small tanneries drew power from the more regular flow. In 1835 another dam was built, backing water farther upstream. A notarial record from that period described the pond as extending for several miles.

By the end of the century, many industries had turned to steam, although the river continued to be used for power. Granby began producing municipal hydroelectricity in 1889. The Granby Rubber Company also raised its dam around this time, enlarging the lake. A 1909 count found five dams and four small artificial ponds within the village limits.

Boating and fishing were established on the lake by the early 1900s. Ice was cut there in winter. The Granby Leader-Mail reported four motorboats in 1907, as well as rowboats and sailboats.

Dominion Rubber raised its dam in 1922, and the higher water flooded farms along the shore. The farmers went to court. In 1924 the company was required to lower the dam, after which the lake receded and the area available for boating and fishing was much reduced.

=== Water supply ===
Until 1932, Granby obtained its municipal water from a lake on Mont Shefford. As the city and its industries grew, that supply was no longer enough, and Lac Boivin became the new source.

Horace Boivin, elected mayor in 1939, supported raising the dam to increase the city's water reserve. The Second World War delayed the work. It was completed in 1945, returning the lake to approximately its level before the 1924 lowering.

A group called the Société du lac Granby was formed in April 1946. Members wanted weeds and submerged stumps cleared from the water and proposed a channel for boats, fish stocking and the introduction of birds. They also discussed a small nature reserve. Most of the proposals were not carried out.

Demand continued to rise. A severe drought in 1967 was followed by the decision to build a separate basin for untreated water, the Lemieux Reservoir. Construction began in 1968 and was completed in the early 1970s.

Granby now draws raw water directly from the North Yamaska. Some can be diverted to the Lemieux Reservoir for storage before treatment; the remainder continues down the river into Lac Boivin. Lac Boivin is no longer the city's direct raw-water reservoir.

=== Protection of the marsh ===
Granby considered dredging Lac Boivin in the early 1970s. Part of the excavated material would have been used to fill sections of marsh, and plans for the shore included a campground, a beach and a marina.

Club Natural had been founded in Granby in 1967 by young naturalists. Its members began recording the plants and animals found in the marsh and objected to filling it before its ecological value had been studied. In 1974 they organized the Association pour la conservation et l'aménagement des marécages (ACAM).

a symposium on the lake followed in the mid-1970s. Participants included biologists, naturalists, school representatives, government officials and local recreation organizations. Recreational facilities were subsequently concentrated on the western side of Lac Boivin; the marsh and eastern sector were retained for nature conservation and interpretation.

Gérald Scott headed the Comité d'aménagement du lac Boivin, which oversaw the work. By 1980, Parc Daniel-Johnson had opened in the recreational sector, and the non-profit Centre d'interprétation de la nature du lac Boivin (CINLB) was established on the conservation side.

== Ecology ==
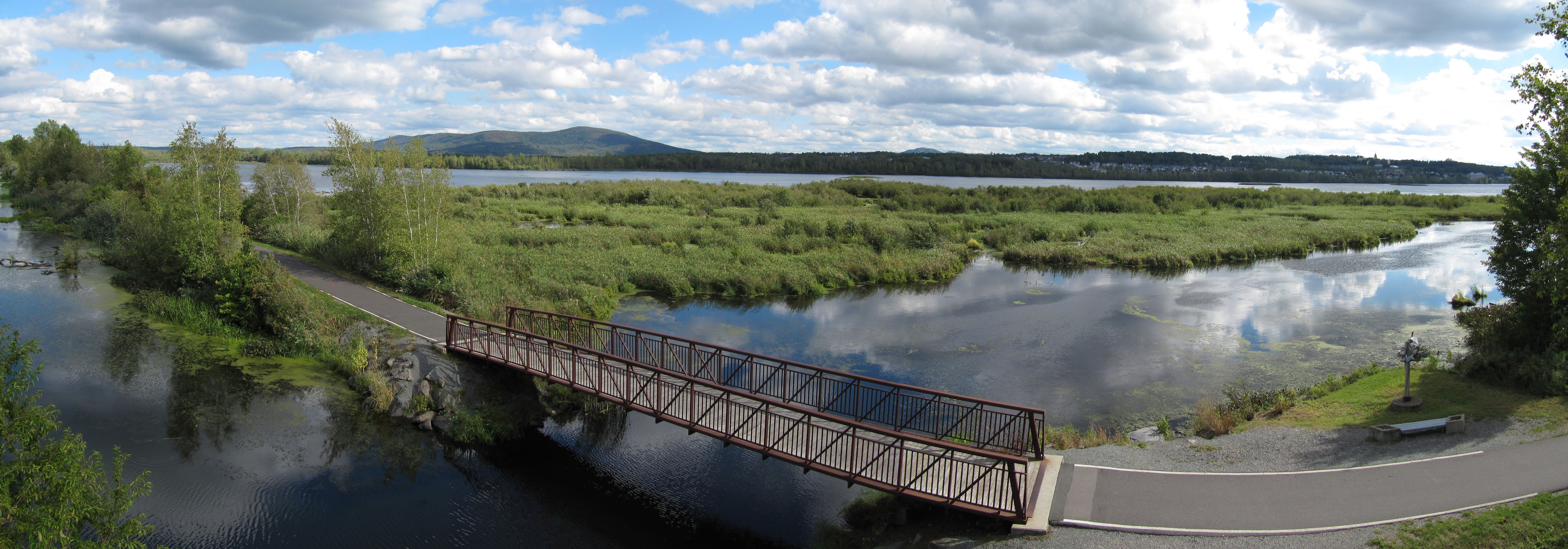
View of the lake from an observation tower at the Centre d'interprétation de la nature du lac Boivin

Cattails and Phragmites grow in shallow parts of the marsh at the northeastern end of Lac Boivin. Pondweeds, wild celery and watermilfoil have also been recorded.

The lake and surrounding wetlands became Important Bird Area QC123 in 2000. At 6.38 km^{2} (2.46 sq mi), the designated area was much larger than Lac Boivin itself and also took in marsh, woodland and urban parkland.

Autumn counts once reached about 2,000 American black ducks, around one per cent of the species' Atlantic population. The IBA records also list mallards, ring-necked ducks, Canada geese, snow geese, common mergansers and blue-winged teal among the migrants using the site.

More than 120 bird species were recorded breeding within the designated area. One or two pairs of least bittern were included in those records. In November 2024, the Committee on the Status of Endangered Wildlife in Canada changed its assessment of the Least Bittern from Threatened to Special Concern. The species remains legally listed as Threatened under Schedule 1 of the federal Species at Risk Act.

Around the northeastern marsh, the CINLB maintains approximately 9.7 km (6.0 mi) of walking trails, including boardwalks and observation points. Ducks Unlimited Canada has also been involved in managing waterfowl habitat at the site.

== Dam and water quality ==
The dam at the outlet controls Lac Boivin's level and the flow of the North Yamaska below it. Quebec classifies it as a high-capacity dam.

A concrete dam built in 1923 remained at the site until the current structure was constructed. Replacement work began in autumn 2017, and the new dam was inaugurated in June 2019. The project cost more than C$6 million. In December 2021, the Commission de toponymie du Québec gave the structure the official name Barrage des Abénaquis.

Granby and the Organisme de bassin versant de la Yamaska have sampled the water since 2010. Measurements include phosphorus, chlorophyll a, dissolved organic carbon, bacteria, dissolved oxygen, pH and transparency. At the deepest station, results from 2010 through 2021 ranged from meso-eutrophic to eutrophic. The 2022 report found no significant long-term change in trophic condition during that period.

For 2024, Quebec's Réseau de surveillance volontaire des lacs classified Lac Boivin as eutrophic. Summer averages were 46 µg/L for total phosphorus, 12 µg/L for chlorophyll a, and 6.9 mg/L for dissolved organic carbon.

Selected summer 2024 water-quality measurements
Parameter	Summer average	Interpretation
Total phosphorus	46 µg/L	Very nutrient-rich; eutrophic
Chlorophyll a	12 µg/L	High suspended algal biomass; eutrophic
Dissolved organic carbon	6.9 mg/L	Strongly coloured water

Aquatic plants are common in the shallower water. The lake bottom receives light over a large area, and the sediments contain high nutrient concentrations. Surveys have recorded Eurasian watermilfoil (Myriophyllum spicatum), pondweeds (Potamogeton spp.), wild celery (Vallisneria americana) and Canadian waterweed (Elodea canadensis).

Granby began mechanically removing aquatic plants from selected areas in 2016. The work was part of the measures adopted after the city's 2015 consultation on the lake.

== Recreation ==
Parc Daniel-Johnson is on the western side of Lac Boivin. Walking and cycling routes run around and away from the lake, while fishing, canoeing, kayaking and wildlife observation are allowed in designated areas. On the northeastern side, the CINLB trails pass through the wooded and marshy parts of the site.

== See also ==
- Yamaska River
- List of lakes of Quebec
