= Petite rivière Missisquoi Nord =

Location
- Country: Canada
- Province: Quebec
- Region: Estrie
- Regional County Municipality: Memphrémagog Regional County Municipality
- Municipality: Bolton-Ouest and Saint-Étienne-de-Bolton

Physical characteristics
- Source: Little lake in mountain
  - location: Bolton-Ouest
  - coordinates: 45°14′46″N 72°24′06″W
  - elevation: 498 m (1,634 ft)
- Mouth: Missisquoi River North
  - location: Saint-Étienne-de-Bolton
  - coordinates: 45°13′15″N 72°21′09″W
  - elevation: 240 m (790 ft)
- Length: 13.2 km (8.2 mi)

Basin features
- Progression: Missisquoi River North, Missisquoi River, lake Champlain, Richelieu River, Saint Lawrence River
- Tributaries
  - left: (Upstream) Discharge from a small lake, 3 streams, discharge from two small lakes.
  - right: (Upstream) Stream, outlet of three small lakes, 7 streams.

The Petite rivière Missisquoi Nord is a tributary of the Missisquoi River North, in the administrative region of Estrie, in the province of Quebec, in Canada. This watercourse crosses the territory of the municipalities of:

- Bolton-Ouest, in the MRC of Brome-Missisquoi;
- Saint-Étienne-de-Bolton, in the MRC of Memphrémagog.

== Geography ==
The Petite rivière Missisquoi Nord rises at the mouth of an unidentified small lake (length: 0.2 kilometres (0.12 mi); altitude: 498 metres (1,634 ft)) located on the west side of the road Summit in the eastern part of the municipality of Bolton-Ouest, almost at the limit of Saint-Étienne-de-Bolton. This lake is located 0.5 kilometres (0.31 mi) south of the summit of Mont Saint-Étienne (altitude: 556 metres (1,824 ft)).

From this head lake, the course of the Petite rivière Missisquoi Nord flows over 13.2 kilometres (8.2 mi), with a drop of 258 metres (846 ft):

- 2.5 kilometres (1.6 mi) towards the north especially in Bolton-Ouest by first forming a loop towards the east (which is in Saint-Étienne-de-Bolton) where the river cuts Summit road and Vincent-Ferrier-Clair road, then crosses a small lake before cutting Summit road again, to Mountain road;
- 2.6 kilometres (1.6 mi) towards the east by first forming a hook towards the north to collect a stream (coming from the northwest) and another stream (coming from the southwest), until mountain range road;
- 0.7 kilometres (0.43 mi) towards the north-east, crossing the road to Bolton Center and passing on the south-east side of the village of Saint-Étienne-de-Bolton, to a bend in the river located south side of rue Cloutier, which corresponds to the outlet of a stream (coming from the north);
- 4.4 kilometres (2.7 mi) towards the south-east by following more or less the path of Bolton Center and by cutting the path of the 1st range, by collecting three streams (each coming from the southwest) and a stream ( coming from the north-east) and crossing the Étang Gras (length: 0.24 kilometres (0.15 mi); altitude: 242 metres (794 ft)) to its mouth;
- 3.0 kilometres (1.9 mi) south along the east side of the Bolton Center road and bending south-east, then south, to its mouth.

The "Petite rivière Missisquoi Nord" flows on the west bank of the Missisquoi River North, just north of the village of Bolton-Center. From this confluence, the current descends on following the course of the Missisquoi River North; on , by the Missisquoi River; on , crossing lake Champlain; and on 124 kilometres (77 mi) by the Richelieu River.

== Toponymy ==
The toponym "Petite Rivière Missisquoi Nord" was formalized on December 5, 2013, at the Commission de toponymie du Québec.

== See also ==
- Memphrémagog Regional County Municipality
- Brome-Missisquoi Regional County Municipality
- Missisquoi River North
- Missisquoi River
- Lake Champlain
- Richelieu River
- List of rivers of Quebec
