= Traditional counties =

Traditional counties are counties which may be no longer used for administrative purposes and refers to:

- Ancient counties of England
- Counties of Scotland
- Historic counties of Wales
- Counties in New Zealand
- List of Quebec counties
