= Shefford =

Shefford can mean the following:

- Shefford, Bedfordshire, a town in Bedfordshire, England
  - Shefford Town F.C., the football (soccer) club based in that town
- Great Shefford, a village in Berkshire, England
- Shefford, Quebec, a township in Eastern Quebec, Canada
- Shefford County, Quebec, a historic county in Quebec
- Shefford (federal electoral district), a federal electoral district in Southern Quebec
- Shefford (provincial electoral district), a provincial electoral district also in Southern Quebec
