= Abitibi County, Quebec =

Historical county in Canada

Coordinates: 48°00′N 76°00′W

Abitibi County (French: Comté d'Abitibi, pronounced [kɔ̃te dabitibi]) was a historical county in southwestern Quebec. The county seat was in Amos, and the area known for its mines and boreal forests. It extended from the Ontario border in the west to the Gouin Reservoir in the east, and included the communities of La Sarre and Val-d'Or in addition to Amos. The county was bounded on the north by Abitibi Territory, on the east by Champlain County, on the west by the Ontario districts of Cochrane and Timiskaming, and on the south by Témiscamingue County, Pontiac County, Montcalm County, Joliette County, Berthier County, Maskinongé County and St. Maurice County. Abitibi County is now part of the Abitibi-Témiscamingue region. The area has a rich culture that dates back thousands of years.

In the early 1980s, Abitibi County was divided into Regional County Municipalities. The western panhandle section became Abitibi-Ouest MRC, the north-central section went to Abitibi MRC, the east-central and southern sections went to Vallée-de-l'Or MRC, the farthest eastern section went to Le Haut-Saint-Maurice MRC (now La Tuque), and a small part in the southwest went to Rouyn-Noranda MRC (now Ville de Rouyn-Noranda).
