= Saint-Étienne-de-Bolton =

- Municipality
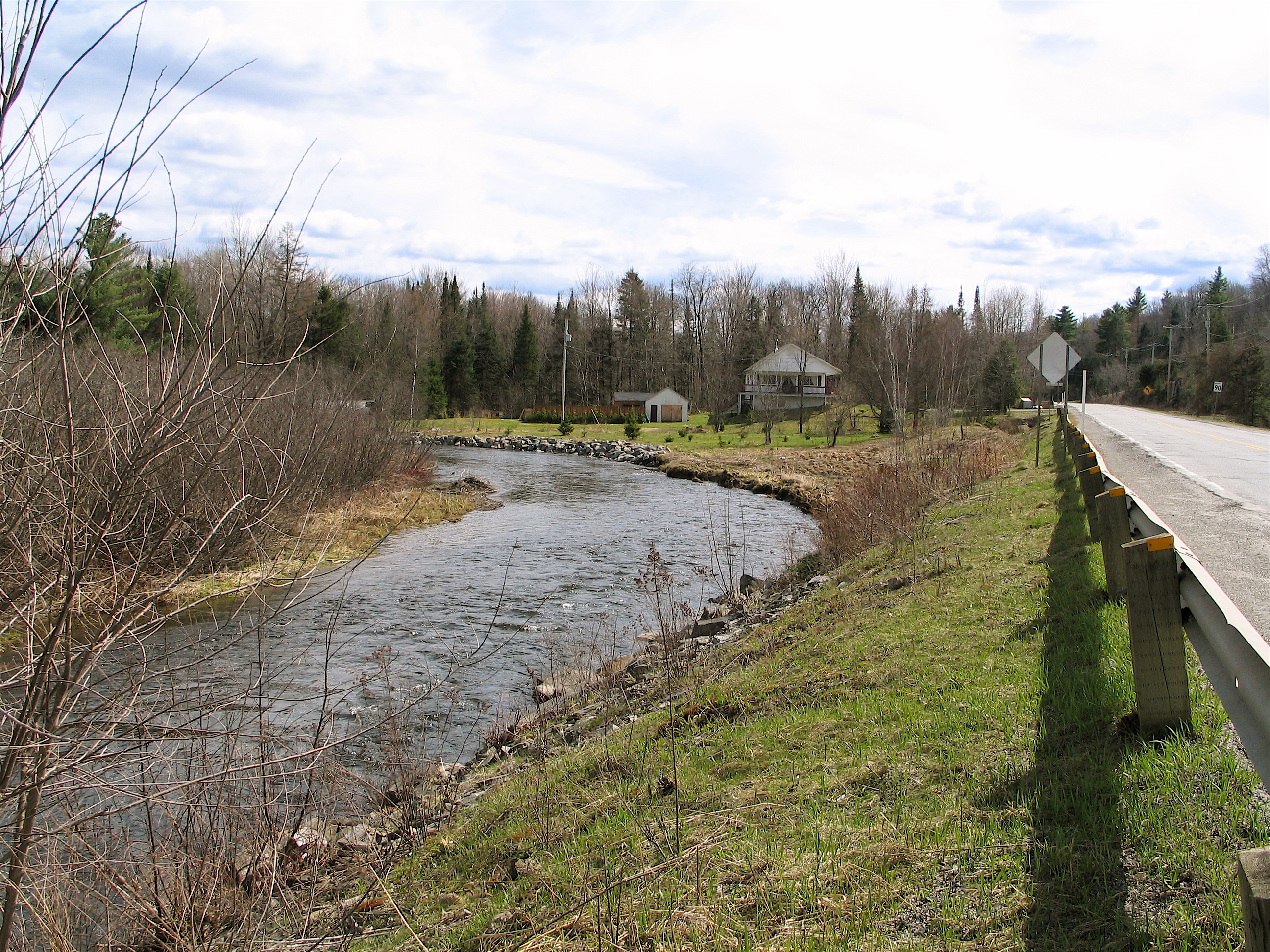

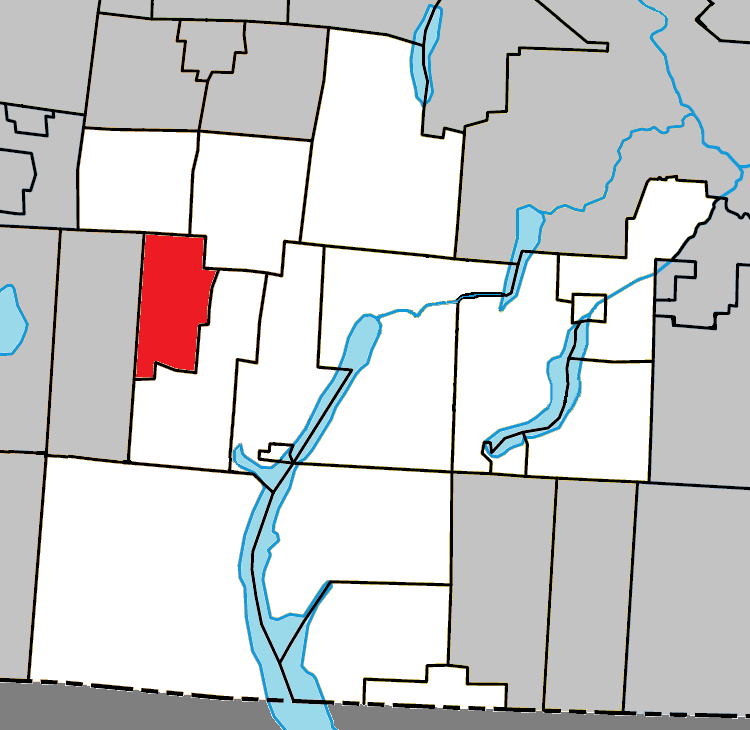
- Location within Memphrémagog RCM

- Location in southern Quebec
- Coordinates: 45°16′N 72°22′W
- Country: Canada
- Province: Quebec
- Region: Estrie
- RCM: Memphrémagog
- Constituted: May 27, 1939

Government
  - Mayor: Michèle Turcotte
  - Federal riding: Brome—Missisquoi
  - Prov. riding: Orford

Area
  - Total: 49.00 km^{2} (18.92 sq mi)
  - Land: 47.27 km^{2} (18.25 sq mi)

Population (2021)
  - Total: 816
  - Density: 17.3/km^{2} (45/sq mi)
  - Pop 2016-2021: ▲21.1%
  - Dwellings: 572
- Time zone: UTC−5 (EST)
  - Summer (DST): UTC−4 (EDT)
- Postal code(s): J0E 2E0
- Area codes: 450 and 579
- Highways A-10: R-112; R-245
- Website: www.sedb.qc.ca

Saint-Étienne-de-Bolton (French pronunciation: [sɛ̃t‿etjɛn də bɔltən]) is a municipality of 800 people, part of the Memphrémagog Regional County Municipality in the Eastern Townships region of Quebec, Canada. It was named after the Roman Catholic parish serving the municipality.

== Geography ==
Located a few kilometers east of Magog east, it is bounded to the east by the Missisquoi River North, 50 km southwest of Sherbrooke. The municipality of Saint-Étienne-de-Bolton is close to Mont Foster and is the second-smallest municipality in the Memphrémagog Regional County Municipality.

== Demographics ==
=== Population ===
Population trend:

| Census | Population | Change |
|---|---|---|
| 2021 | 816 | ▲21.1% |
| 2016 | 674 | ▲26.2% |
| 2011 | 534 | ▲7.7% |
| 2006 | 496 | ▲7.1% |
| 2001 | 463 | ▲15.8% |
| 1996 | 400 | ▲6.1% |
| 1991 | 377 | N/A |

=== Language ===
Mother tongue (2021)

| Language | Population | Pct (%) |
|---|---|---|
| French only | 730 | 89.0% |
| English only | 55 | 6.7% |
| English and French | 10 | 1.2% |
| Non-official languages | 20 | 2.4% |

== Transportation ==
=== Railways ===
Canadian Pacific Railway operates a railway line that passes through Saint-Étienne-de-Bolton.

=== Highways ===
Quebec Autoroute 10, Quebec Route 112 and Quebec Route 245 serve Saint-Étienne-de-Bolton.

== See also ==
- List of municipalities in Quebec
