= Terrebonne County, Quebec =

Coordinates: 45.77°N 73.99°W

Terrebonne County (French: Comté de Terrebonne, pronounced [kɔ̃te də tɛʁbɔn]) is a historical county in the Laurentides region of Quebec, Canada. Its county seat and main city was Saint-Jérôme.

In the early 1980s Quebec's counties were abolished and replaced by regional county municipalities.
