= List of former counties of Quebec =

Overview of historical counties and territories in Quebec

Historical counties and territories in Quebec, Canada, and their county seats are listed below. The list is alphabetized by county, but can also be alphabetized by seat.

In terms of internal division, there are four types of counties:

1. Those that contain only townships, as do counties surveyed by the British after 1763.
2. Those that contain only parishes, as do counties chiefly in the Saint Lawrence Valley settled by French colonists before 1761.
3. Those that each contain both townships and parishes.
4. Those that each contain townships and undivided lands, as do the northern counties outside the main populated areas of the province.

Parishes as a land unit division arise from the elevation of municipalities based on religious parish limits (parish municipalities). Quebec's counties were dissolved in the early 1980s and Quebec was then divided into regional county municipalities.

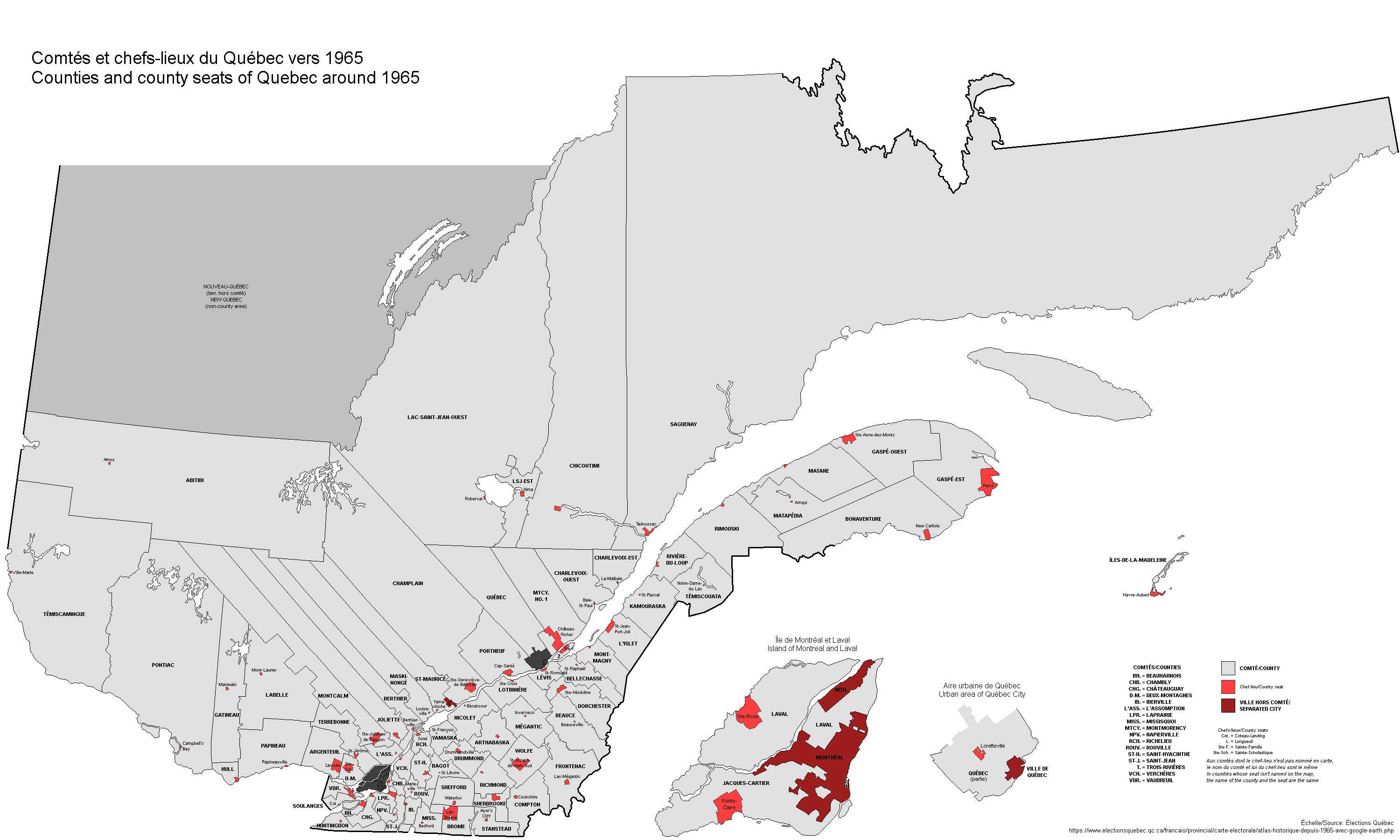
Counties and county seats of Quebec around 1965

County	Seat
Abitibi County	Amos
Argenteuil County	Lachute
Arthabaska County	Arthabaska
Bagot County	Saint-Liboire
Beauce County	Beauceville
Beauharnois County	Beauharnois
Bellechasse County	Saint-Raphaël
Berthier County	Berthierville
Bonaventure County	New Carlisle
Brome County	Knowlton
Chambly County	Longueuil
Champlain County	Sainte-Geneviève-de-Batiscan
Charlevoix-Est County	La Malbaie
Charlevoix-Ouest County	Baie-Saint-Paul
Châteauguay County	Sainte-Martine
Chicoutimi County	Chicoutimi
Compton County	Cookshire
Deux-Montagnes County	Sainte-Scholastique
Dorchester County	Sainte-Hénédine
Drummond County	Drummondville
Frontenac County	Lac-Mégantic
Gaspé-Est County	Percé
Gaspé-Ouest County	Sainte-Anne-des-Monts
Gatineau County	Maniwaki
Hull County	Hull
Huntingdon County	Huntingdon
Iberville County	Iberville
Ile-de-Montréal County	Montreal
Ile-Jésus County	Laval
Iles-de-la-Madeleine County	Ile-du-Havre-Aubert
Joliette County	Joliette
Kamouraska County	Saint-Pascal
Labelle County	Mont-Laurier
Laprairie County	La Prairie
Laviolette County	La Tuque
L'Assomption County	L'Assomption
Lévis County	Saint-Romuald
L'Islet County	Saint-Jean-Port-Joli
Lotbinière County	Sainte-Croix
Lac-Saint-Jean-Est County	Alma
Lac-Saint-Jean-Ouest County	Roberval
Maskinongé County	Louiseville
Matane County	Matane
Matapédia County	Amqui
Mégantic County	Inverness
Missisquoi County	Bedford
Montcalm County	Sainte-Julienne
Montmorency No. 1 County	Chateau-Richer
Montmorency No. 2 County	Sainte-Famille
Montmagny County	Montmagny
Napierville County	Napierville
Nicolet County	Bécancour
Papineau County	Papineauville
Pontiac County	Campbell's Bay
Portneuf County	Cap-Santé
Québec County	Quebec City
Richelieu County	Sorel-Tracy
Richmond County	Richmond
Rimouski County	Rimouski
Rivière-du-Loup County	Rivière-du-Loup
Rouville County	Marieville
Saint-Hyacinthe County	Saint-Hyacinthe
Saint-Jean County	Saint-Jean-sur-Richelieu
Saint-Maurice County	Yamachiche
Saguenay County	Tadoussac
Shefford County	Waterloo
Sherbrooke County	Sherbrooke
Soulanges County	Coteau-Landing
Stanstead County	Ayer's Cliff
Témiscouata County	Notre-Dame-du-Lac
Témiscamingue County	Ville-Marie
Terrebonne County	Saint-Jérôme
Vaudreuil County	Vaudreuil-Dorion
Verchères County	Verchères
Wolfe County	Saint-Joseph-de-Ham-Sud
Yamaska County	Saint-François-du-Lac

- Abitibi Territory
- Mistassini Territory
- Nouveau-Quebec Territory

== Renamed counties ==
- Laval County – Former name of Ile-Jésus County.
- Jacques Cartier County – Renamed in 1970. Former name of Ile-de-Montréal County. It absorbed Hochelaga County in 1921.
- Ottawa County – Former name of Hull County.
- Wright County – Former name of Ottawa County.
