= Quebec Route 245 =

Highway in Quebec, Canada

Route 245

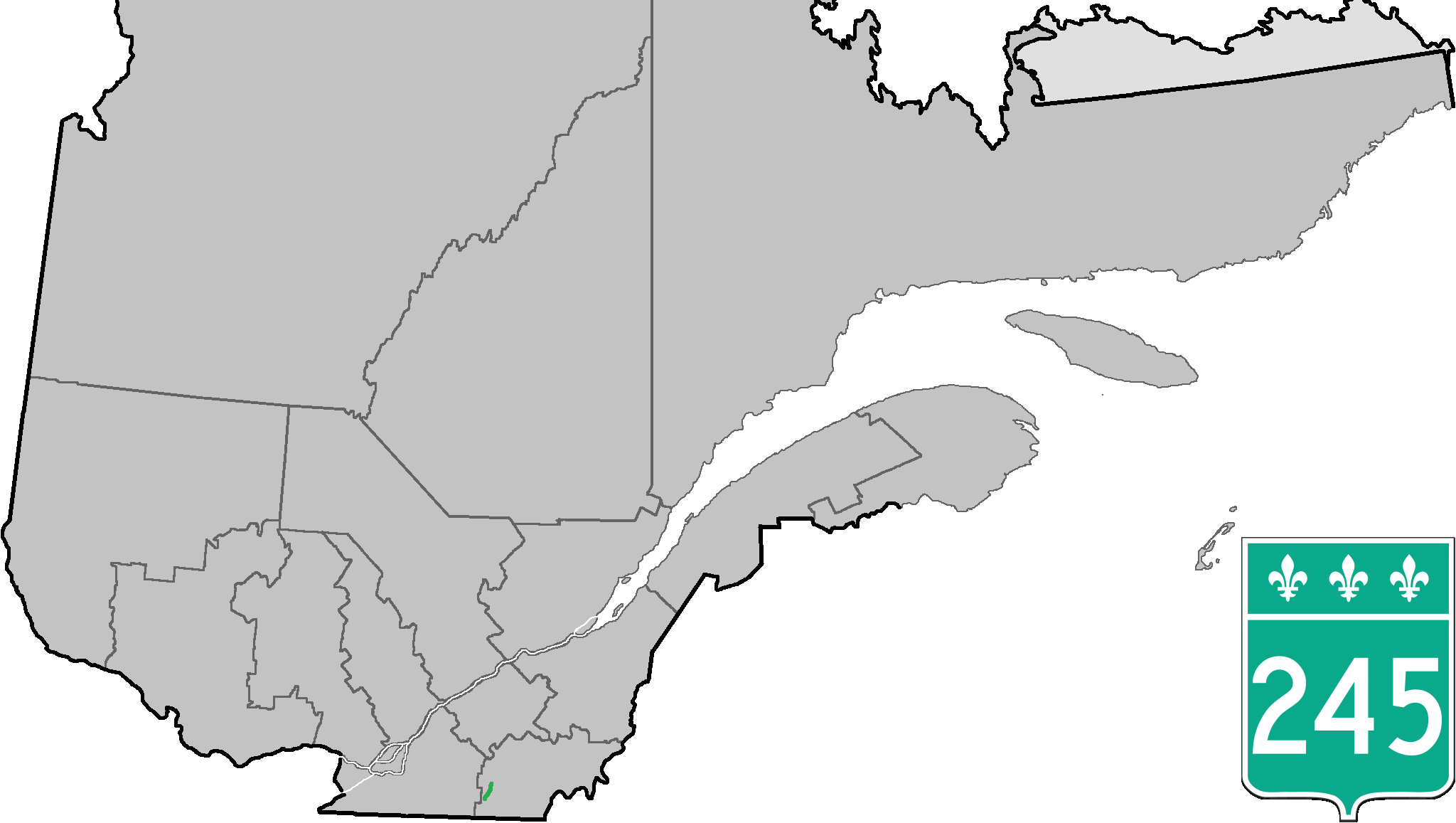

Route information
- Maintained by Transports Québec
- Length: 16.7 km (10.4 mi)

Major junctions
- South end: R-243 in Bolton-Est (South Bolton)
- A-10 in Eastman
- North end: R-112 in Eastman

Location
- Country: Canada
- Province: Quebec

Highway system
- Quebec provincial highways; Autoroutes; List; Former
← R-243	→ R-247

Route 245 is a short north–south highway on the south shore of the Saint Lawrence River in the Estrie region of Quebec. It links Eastman at the junction of Route 112 and the hamlet of South Bolton, in Bolton-Est, at the junction of Route 243. It is known as Rue Lapointe ("Lapointe Street") in Eastman, becoming Route Missisquoi ("Missisquoi Road") as it crosses over in Bolton-Est.

== Municipalities along Route 245 ==
- Bolton-Est
- Eastman

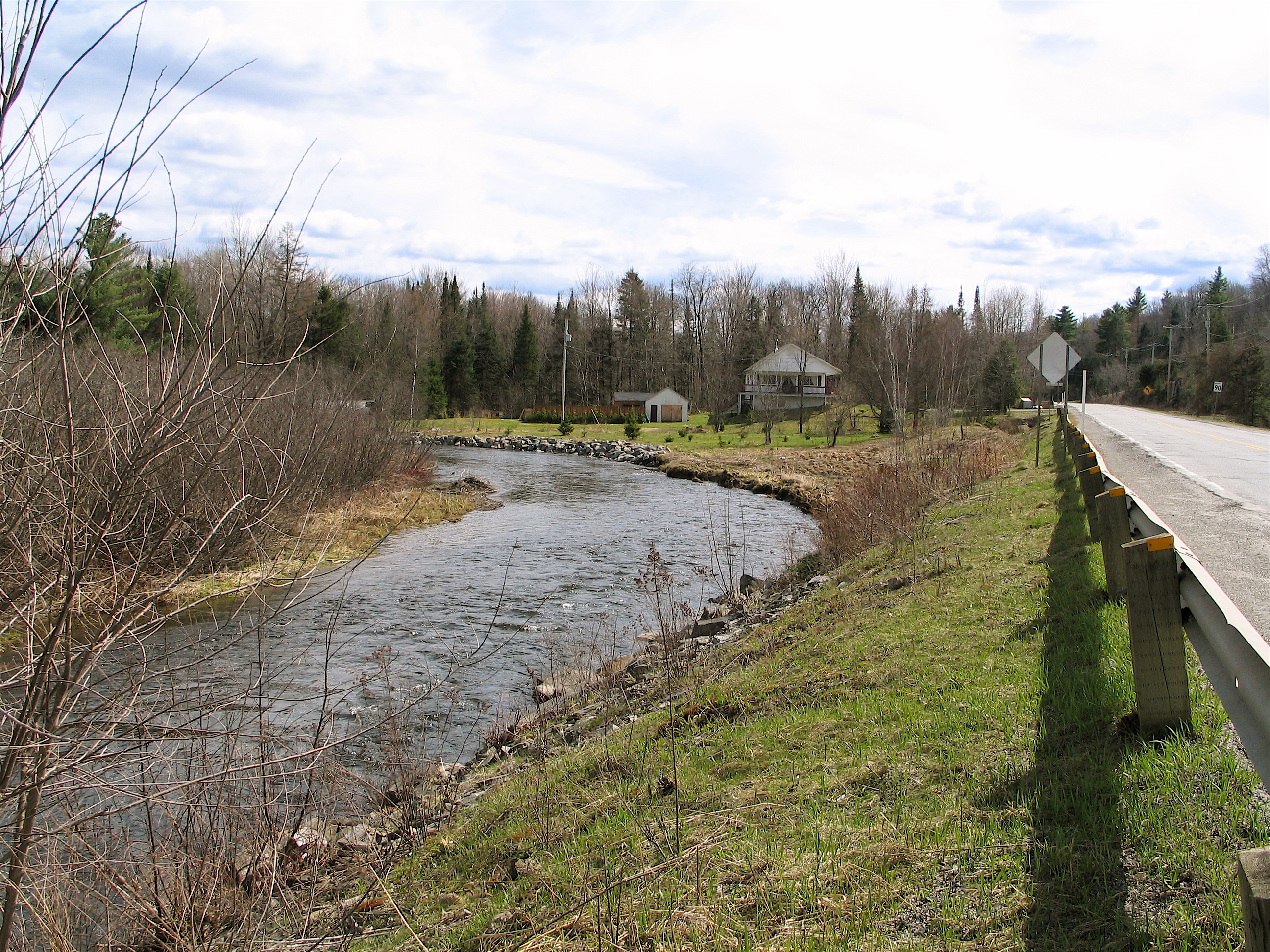
Route 245 follows the course of North Missisquoi River.

== See also ==
- List of Quebec provincial highways
