= Saguenay County, Quebec =

Historical county of Quebec

Coordinates: 51°00′N 64°00′W

Saguenay County, Quebec is an historical county in Quebec. It generally consisted of all of Quebec east of Tadoussac and north of the Saint Lawrence River. The county seat was also Tadoussac. Today, the county is found in the Regional County Municipalities of La Haute-Côte-Nord, Manicouagan, Sept-Rivières, Minganie and Basse-Côte-Nord.

Reports from provincial surveyors regarding the forest wealth of Canada for Quebec between 1887 and 1893, published by the Canadian Department of Agriculture in 1895, included 20 entries on rivers within Saguenay County. Most of these rivers had spruce trees near them.
