= Sherbrooke History Museum =

- Musée d’histoire de Sherbrooke
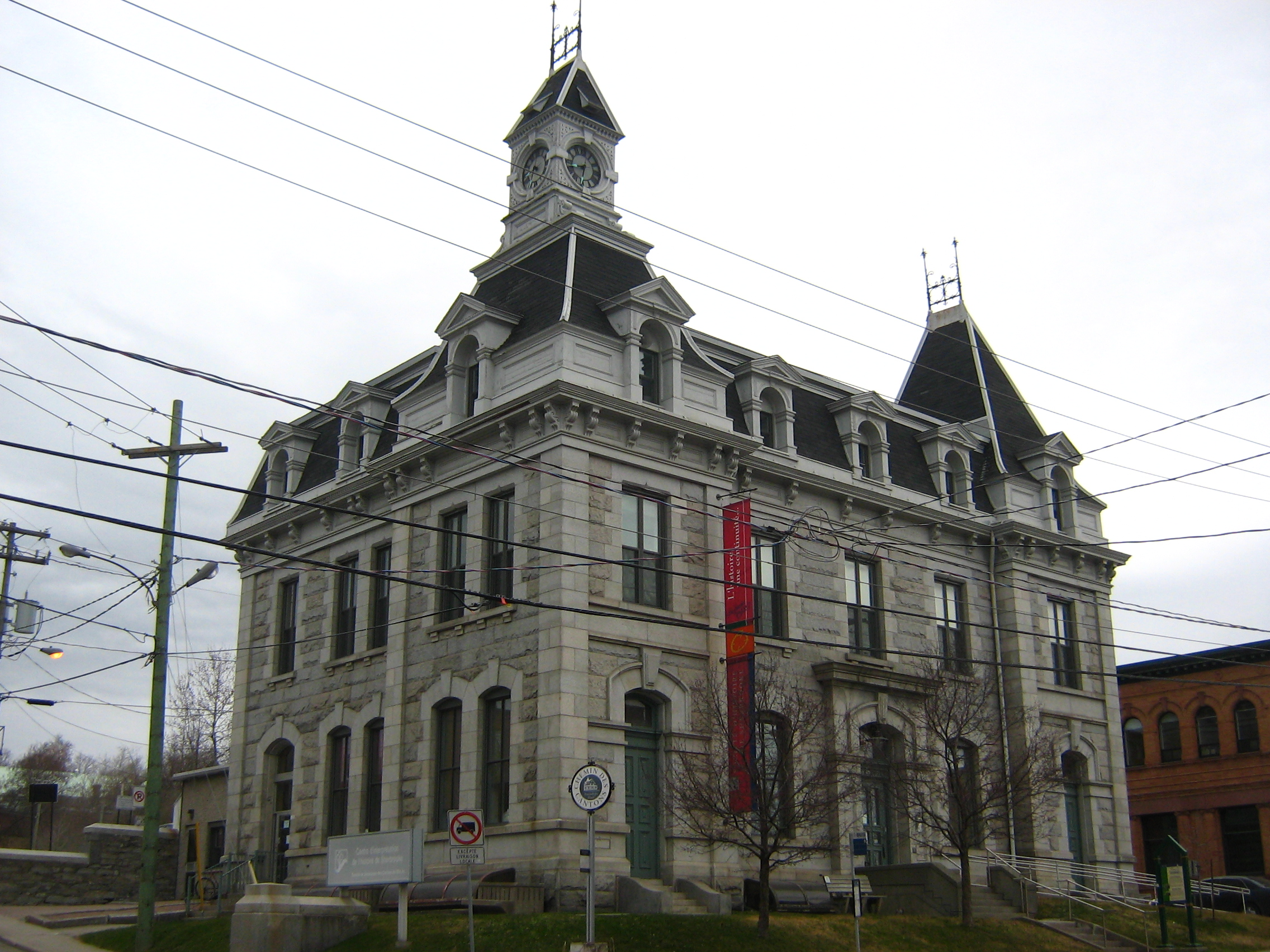
- Former name: Société Historique des Cantons-de-l’Est (1927); Société d’histoire de Sherbrooke (1989)
- Established: March 2, 1927
- Location: 275 Dufferin Street; Sherbrooke, Quebec; J1H 4M5
- Coordinates: 45.4056°N 71.8949°W
- Type: History museum
- Accreditation: Canadian Museums Association
- Parking: On site (no charge)
- Website: mhist.org/en/

The Sherbrooke History Museum, Musée d’histoire de Sherbrooke (MHIST), is a museum and archives centre in Sherbrooke, Quebec, Canada. It preserves, studies, and exhibits the history of Sherbrooke and the Eastern Townships.

== History ==
Founded in 1927 as the Société Historique des Cantons-de l’Est, the institution was renamed the Société d’histoire de Sherbrooke in 1989 and gained recognition as a certified archives service the following year.

A 1933 Le Devoir article described the founding of the Société historique des Cantons de l’Est in 1927, with Dr. John Hayes of Richmond as its first president. The society aimed to collect documents and artifacts from the Eastern Townships, promote local history, and mark historically significant sites in and around Sherbrooke, including the confluence of the Saint-François and Magog rivers.

In 1992, it moved into its current home, a heritage Second Empire building at 275 Dufferin Street built in 1885 as a post office and customs house. The organization adopted its present name, MHIST – Musée d’histoire de Sherbrooke, in 2019. The building underwent major restoration between 2016 and 2020.

In August 2024, Radio-Canada reported that the Sherbrooke History Museum raised concerns about the difficulty of accessing the City of Sherbrooke's historical archives. Museum representatives noted that researchers often faced inadequate search tools, outdated inventories, and delays in locating materials. They expressed hope that access would improve before the city's 225th anniversary in 2027.

== Collections and Exhibitions ==
MHIST houses over 600 archival fonds, about 120,000 photographs, and a large newspaper collection. Its permanent exhibition, Sherbrooke’s Memories, covers two centuries of local history, while temporary and virtual exhibits address themes such as industry, religion, and everyday life.

The museum offers school and community programs, guided tours, and historical walking circuits. It also makes parts of its collection available online.

MHIST is a non-profit organization supported by the City of Sherbrooke, the Québec Ministry of Culture and Communications, Bibliothèque et Archives nationales du Québec, and membership contributions.

== Awards and recognition ==
In 2017, the Sherbrooke History Museum received the Governor General's History Award for Excellence in Community Programming for its annual event L’Histoire fait son marché (History Goes to the Market), which recreates the atmosphere of a 1900s public market through historical displays, performances, and community participation.

== See also ==
- History of Sherbrooke
- List of museums in Quebec
- Sherbrooke Museum of Fine Arts
- Serge Malenfant
