= Serge Malenfant =

Canadian painter (died 2026)

- Died: 11 July 2026; Sherbrooke, Quebec, Canada
- Occupation: Painter

Serge Malenfant (died July 11 2026) was a Canadian painter.

Malenfant was best-known for creating trompe-l'œil murals for the city of Sherbrooke. He created his first in 2002 at the intersection of Rue Frontenac and Rue Dufferin. He was also a board member of the Sherbrooke History Museum. In 2025, he was a mural expert assistant to Adèle Blais during the creation of a mural on Ruelle Whiting in Sherbrooke. In 2026, he drew the illustrations for the collection of stories titled La lutinerie.

Malenfant died on July 11 2026 when his motorcycle collided with a pickup truck.
