= Hull County, Quebec =

Historic county of Quebec, Canada

Coordinates: 45°40′N 75°35′W

Hull County, formerly known as Wright County, is an historic county of Quebec, Canada. It was named after the town of the same name (Hull or Kingston-upon-Hull) in East Yorkshire, England. It is located on the north shore of the Ottawa River and is part of the Outaouais, one of roughly 12 historical regions of Québec.

The county is roughly rectangular, bound in the north by the Township of Portland in Papineau County (45 degrees N 41', 12 km), entirely in the east by the Township of Buckingham in Papineau County (75 degrees W 33', 22 km), on its northwestern corner by the Township of Wakefield in Gatineau, and on its west by the Township of Hull in Gatineau County. Across the entire length of its Ottawa River border is the Township of Gloucester in Carleton County, both part of Ottawa, in Ontario. The entire county is the same as the former Township of Templeton. The township-county comprised several communities, namely Templeton, Gatineau, and Pointe-Gatineau which have now been merged. In terms of topography, about two-thirds of the county in the north contain landscapes typical of the Canadian Shield, while the lower third is gentler valley terrain.

Map of Hull County in 1928

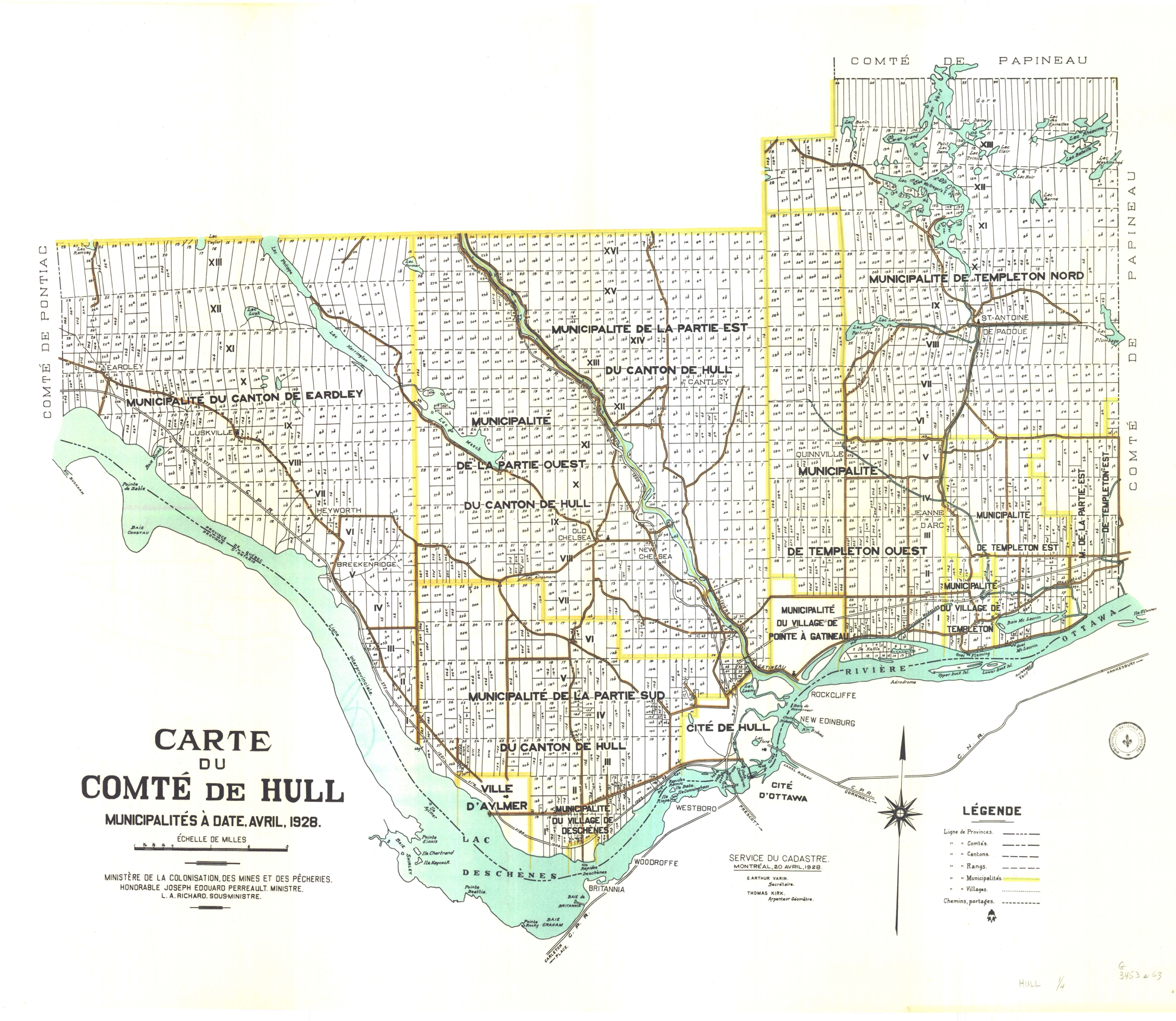

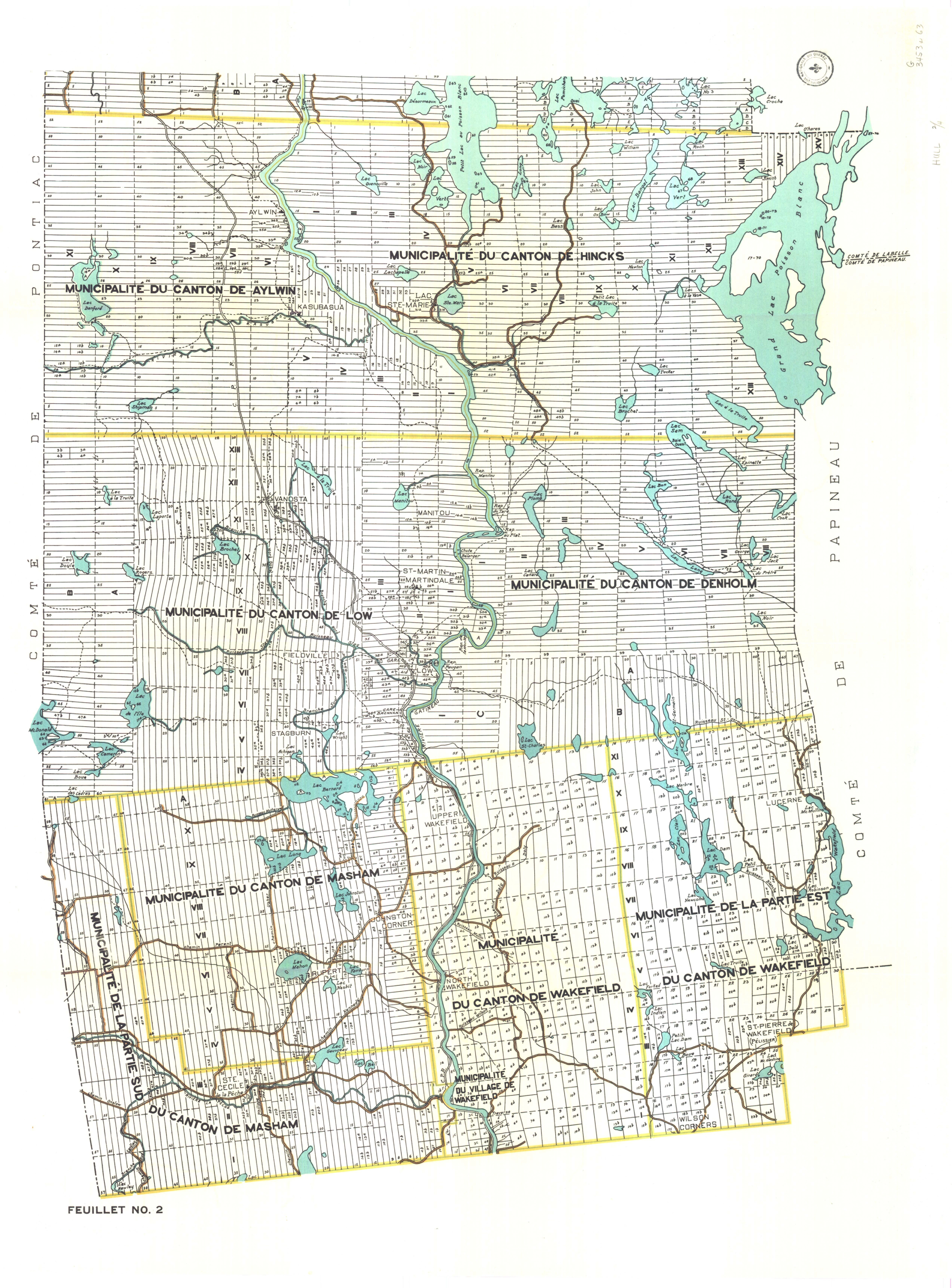

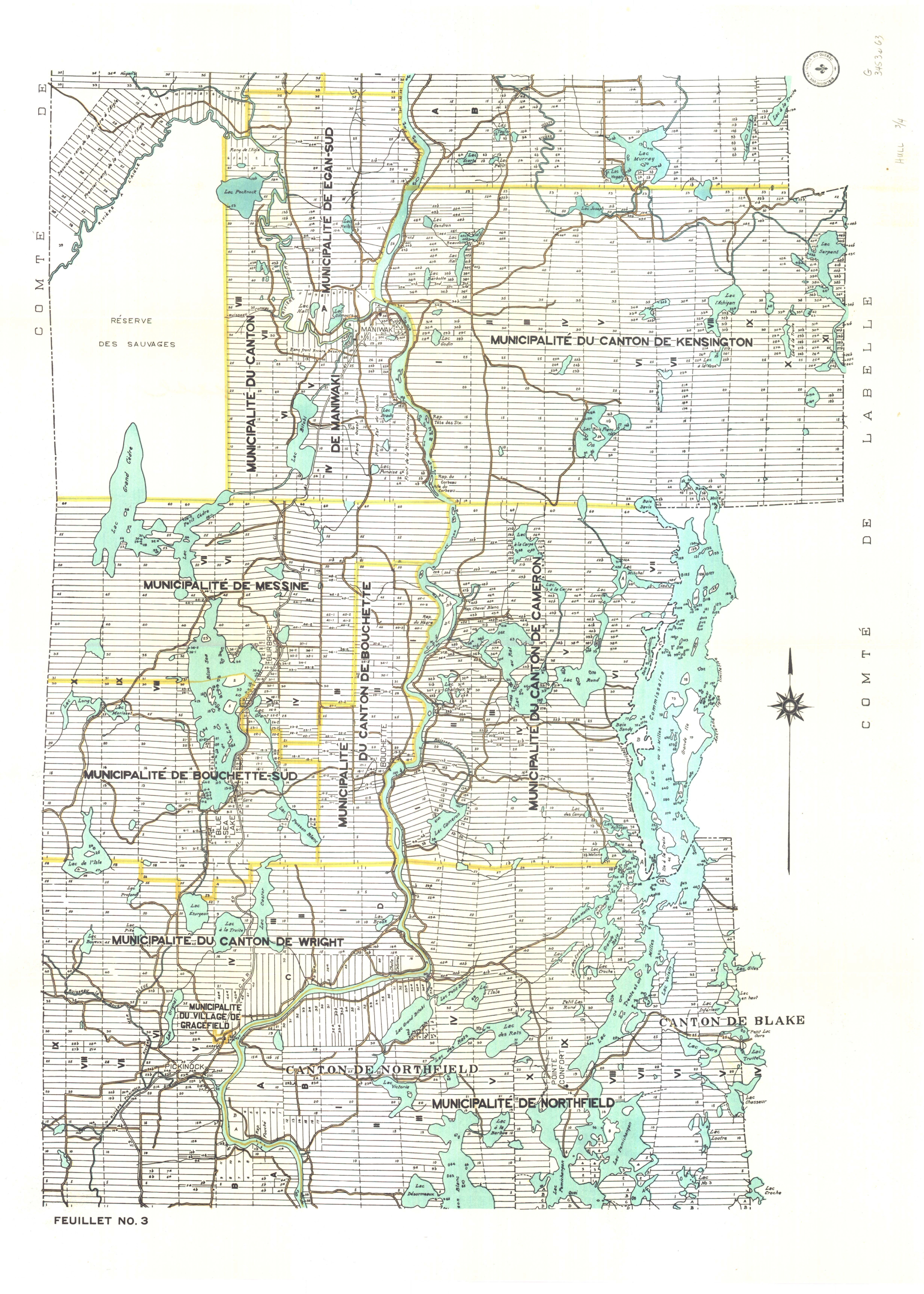

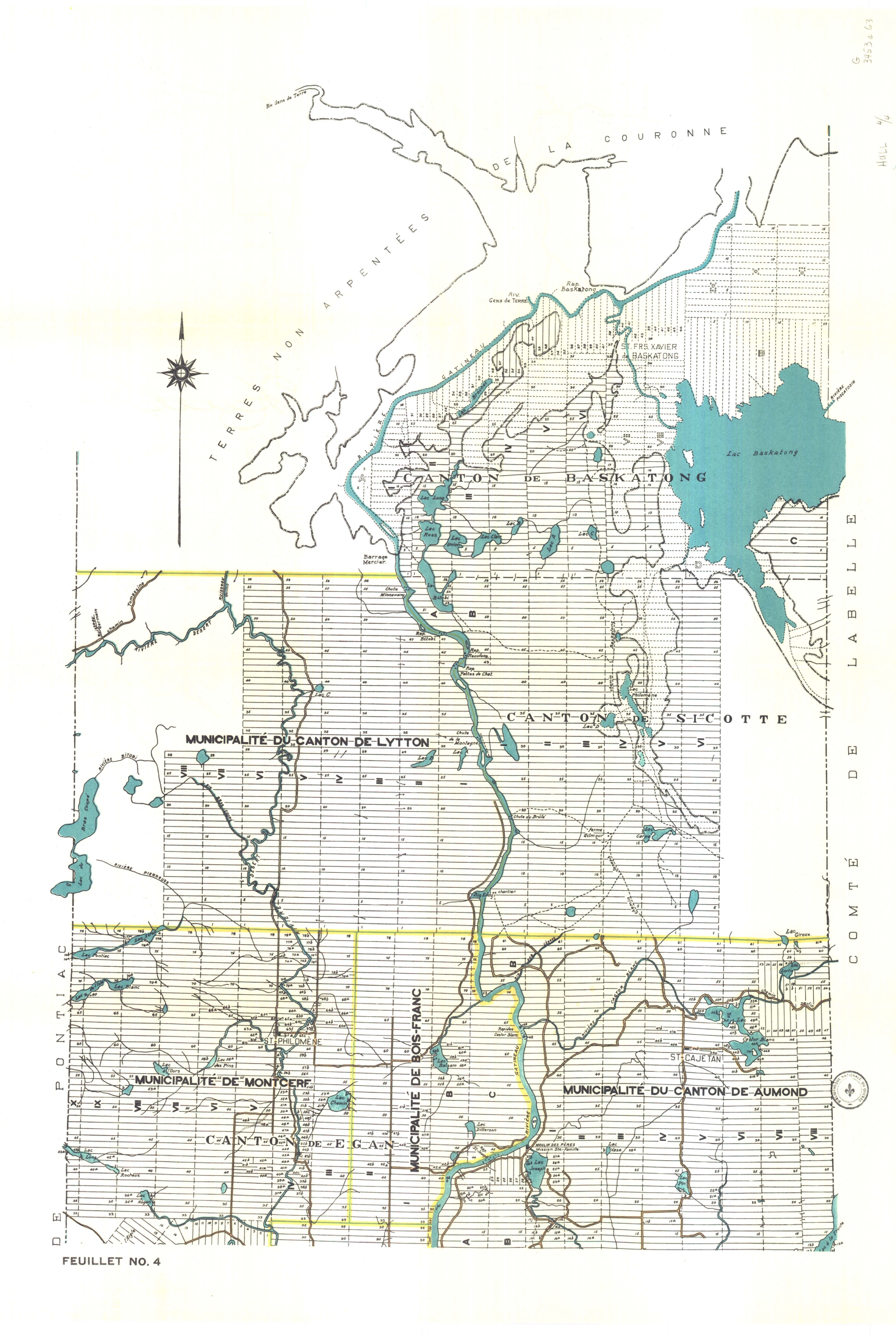

The historic Towns of Gatineau and Pointe-Gatineau were often thought of as being in neighbouring Gatineau County however they were in Hull County. Likewise the former township of Hull (although the city itself was in Hull County) was to the west in Gatineau County. The County seat of Hull County was located in Hull. In the early 1990s, following the abolishment of Quebec's counties ten years earlier, a Regional County Municipality system was installed and northern Hull County became Les Collines-de-l'Outaouais Regional County Municipality and the southern half was transferred into the Outaouais Urban Community (now the City of Gatineau).

Canadian prime minister William Lyon Mackenzie King died here on July 22, 1950.

== Name ==
Wright County took the name of Ottawa County on 3 April 1912. On 17 March 1919, it was renamed Hull County.

== Note ==
The Townships are primarily a surveying unit introduced after the British conquest, and were designated to cover most of the unattributed territory in Quebec. They were given out (concessions) to "Leaders" who had the responsibility of finding "Associates" and to develop their Township. The usual size was about 10 miles (16 km) X 10 miles (16 km) - it varied slightly during surveying periods.

The surveyors divided Townships into lines, and that in turn they divided into lots. A lot was generally 200 acres (0.81 km^{2}).

== Historic Townships ==
- Township of Buckingham
- Township of Hull
- Township of Templeton
- Templeton-Est
- Templeton-Est Est
- Templeton-Ouest
- Templeton-Sud
