= Shefford County, Quebec =

Historical county in Quebec, Canada

Coordinates: 45°27′N 72°32′W

Shefford County is an historical county in southern Quebec, Canada. It is named after Shefford, a small town in Bedfordshire, England, of the same name and is in the Eastern Townships region of Quebec.

Topographically, part of the county is situated on the western foothills of the Appalachian Mountains. The county contains four small lakes: Lake Waterloo, near Waterloo; Lake Boivin, in Granby Township; Lake Roxton, in Roxton Township; and Lake Stukely, in Stukely Township. All of the lakes flow into the Yamaska River except for Lake Stukely, which feeds into the St-François River, both of which flow northwards and are tributaries to the Saint Lawrence River. A prominent feature of the county is Mont Shefford in the Township of Shefford, one of a series of the Monteregian Hills, which lie in a line between the Appalachian Mountains and the Saint Lawrence River.

The county is shaped almost like a trapezoid. It is bounded in the south by Brome County (48 km; 45°17' N); in the north and the northwest by Bagot County (35 km; 45°41' N), Richmond, and Sherbrooke Counties; and in the east (35 km; 72°15' W) and the west by Rouville County (34 km; 72°46' W).

The county is divided into seven townships of which six are square-shaped, three in the north (from east to west, the Township of Ely, the Township of Roxton and the Township of Milton); and three in the south (from east to west, the Township of Stukely, the Township of Shefford and the Township of Granby). The Township of Upton is a strip of land located in the northwestern corner of the county and measures 1,25 km by 6,25 km. The county seat is Waterloo, located in the Township of Shefford. The best known town in the county is Granby, located in the township of the same name, known for its annual song and musical festival. Another well known town is Bromont, located in the southwestern corner of Shefford Township. The town has Canada's only IBM plant and was the site of the 1976 Summer Olympics equestrian events.

In the early 1980s, Quebec abolished its counties, and Shefford County was divided and transferred to Acton Regional County Municipality (north), Les Maskoutains Regional County Municipality (northwest), La Haute-Yamaska Regional County Municipality (west), Brome-Missisquoi Regional County Municipality (southwest), Memphremagog Regional County Municipality (southeast), and Le Val-Saint-Francois Regional County Municipality (northeast).

== See also ==
- Shefford, Quebec
