= Missisquoi River North =

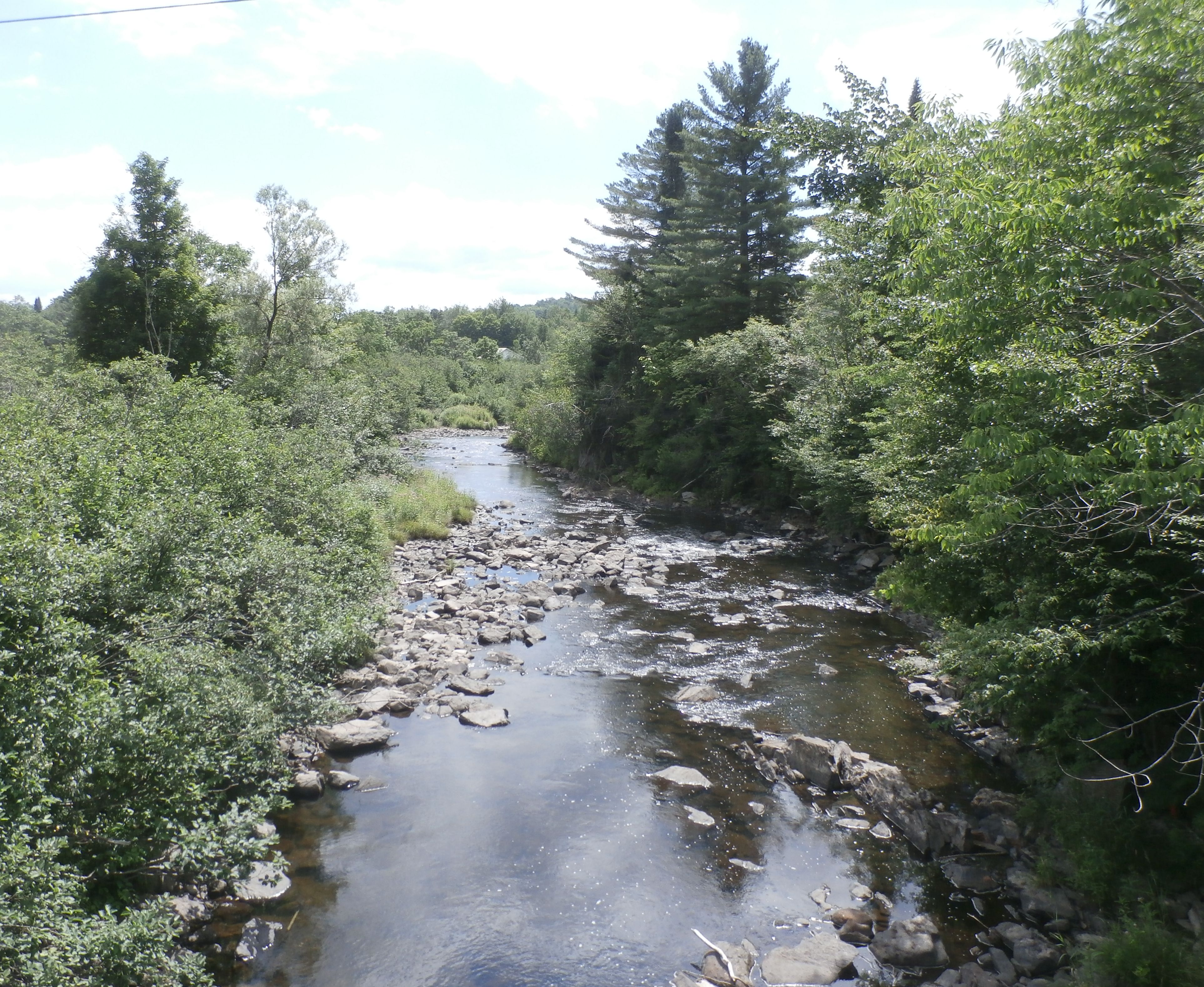
- Missisquoi River North downstream from East River Road near Bolton.

Location
- Country: Canada
- Province: Quebec
- Region: Estrie
- Regional County Municipality: Memphrémagog Regional County Municipality
- Municipality: Eastman, Stukely-Sud, Saint-Étienne-de-Bolton, Bolton-Est, Mansonville and Potton

Physical characteristics
- Source: Lac d'Argent
  - location: Eastman
  - coordinates: 45.31028°N 72.31416°W
  - elevation: 249 m (817 ft)
- Mouth: Missisquoi River
  - location: Potton
  - coordinates: 45.02666°N 72.43°W
  - elevation: 153 m (502 ft)

Basin features
- Progression: Missisquoi River, Lake Champlain, Richelieu River, Saint Lawrence River
- Tributaries
  - left: (Upstream) Décharge de l'Étang Johnson, décharge de l'Étang Olive, décharge du Lac Long Pond.
  - right: (Upstream) Petite rivière Missisquoi Nord

The Missisquoi North River is a tributary of the Missisquoi River. The Missisquoi North River flows through the municipalities of Eastman, Stukely-Sud, Saint-Étienne-de-Bolton, Bolton-Est, Mansonville and Potton, in the Memphrémagog Regional County Municipality, in the administrative region of Estrie, in Quebec, in Canada.

== Geography ==
The main hydrographic slopes near the Missisquoi North river are:

- North side: Yamaska River, Noire River (Yamaska River);
- East side: Étang stream, Brulé stream, Province Hill stream, Lake Memphremagog;
- South side: Missisquoi River;
- West side: Missisquoi River.

Upper river course

The Missisquoi North River originates west of Lake Stukely and south of North Stukely. Two streams (coming from the north and the northwest) flow into Parker Lake (altitude: 246 metres (807 ft)). Then the current descends on 1.2 kilometres (0.75 mi) to the north shore of Lac d'Argent (length: 1.7 kilometres (1.1 mi); altitude: 246 metres (807 ft)) that the current crosses south over its full length; this lake flows into the North Missisquoi river by a small bay south of the lake.

From this bay, the North Missisquoi River flows for 7.1 kilometres (4.4 mi) south to the northeast shore of Trousers Lake (altitude: 239 metres (784 ft)) that the current crosses towards the southwest on 1.5 kilometres (0.93 mi). This lake is fed by "Long Pond Lake" (length: 2.8 kilometres (1.7 mi); altitude: 245 metres (804 ft)) which flows onto the east shore of Trousers Lake.

River course downstream of Trousers Lake (segment of 40.9 kilometres (25.4 mi))

From Trousers Lake, the river flows on:

- 2.7 kilometres (1.7 mi) south to the outlet (coming from the north) of Étang Grass;
- 0.5 kilometres (0.31 mi) south by collecting the discharge from the Petite rivière Missisquoi Nord (coming from the North) to the outlet (from the east) of the Étang Olive;
- 2.3 kilometres (1.4 mi) south to the Nicolas-Austin road bridge at Bolton-Est;
- 1.3 kilometres (0.81 mi) south to Ives stream (coming from the west);
- 2.5 kilometres (1.6 mi) south to the outlet (from the east) of Johnson Pond;
- 2.7 kilometres (1.7 mi) south to West Field Creek (coming from the west);
- 12.1 kilometres (7.5 mi) (or 6.4 kilometres (4.0 mi) in a direct line) towards the south by snaking to the Étang stream (coming from the east);
- 10.7 kilometres (6.6 mi) (or 5.5 kilometres (3.4 mi) in a direct line) towards the south by winding up to the bridge of Mansonville;
- 6.1 kilometres (3.8 mi) (or 3.7 kilometres (2.3 mi) in a direct line) towards the southwest by winding up to its mouth.

The Missisquoi River North flows on the north bank of the Missisquoi River in the municipality of Potton, opposite the hamlet of Highwater.

== Toponymy ==
The term "missisquoi" in Abenaki means "multitudes of water birds", which takes on this river all its meaning.

The toponym "Rivière Missisquoi Nord" was formalized on December 5, 1968, at the Commission de toponymie du Québec.

== See also ==
- Potton, a municipality
- Mansonville, a municipality
- Bolton-Est, a municipality
- Saint-Étienne-de-Bolton, a municipality
- Stukely-Sud, a municipality
- Eastman, a municipality
- Memphrémagog Regional County Municipality
- Missisquoi River, a stream
- Petite rivière Missisquoi Nord, a stream
- List of rivers of Quebec
