= Yamaska National Park =

National park of Quebec, Canada

Coordinates: 45°25′47″N 72°36′59″W

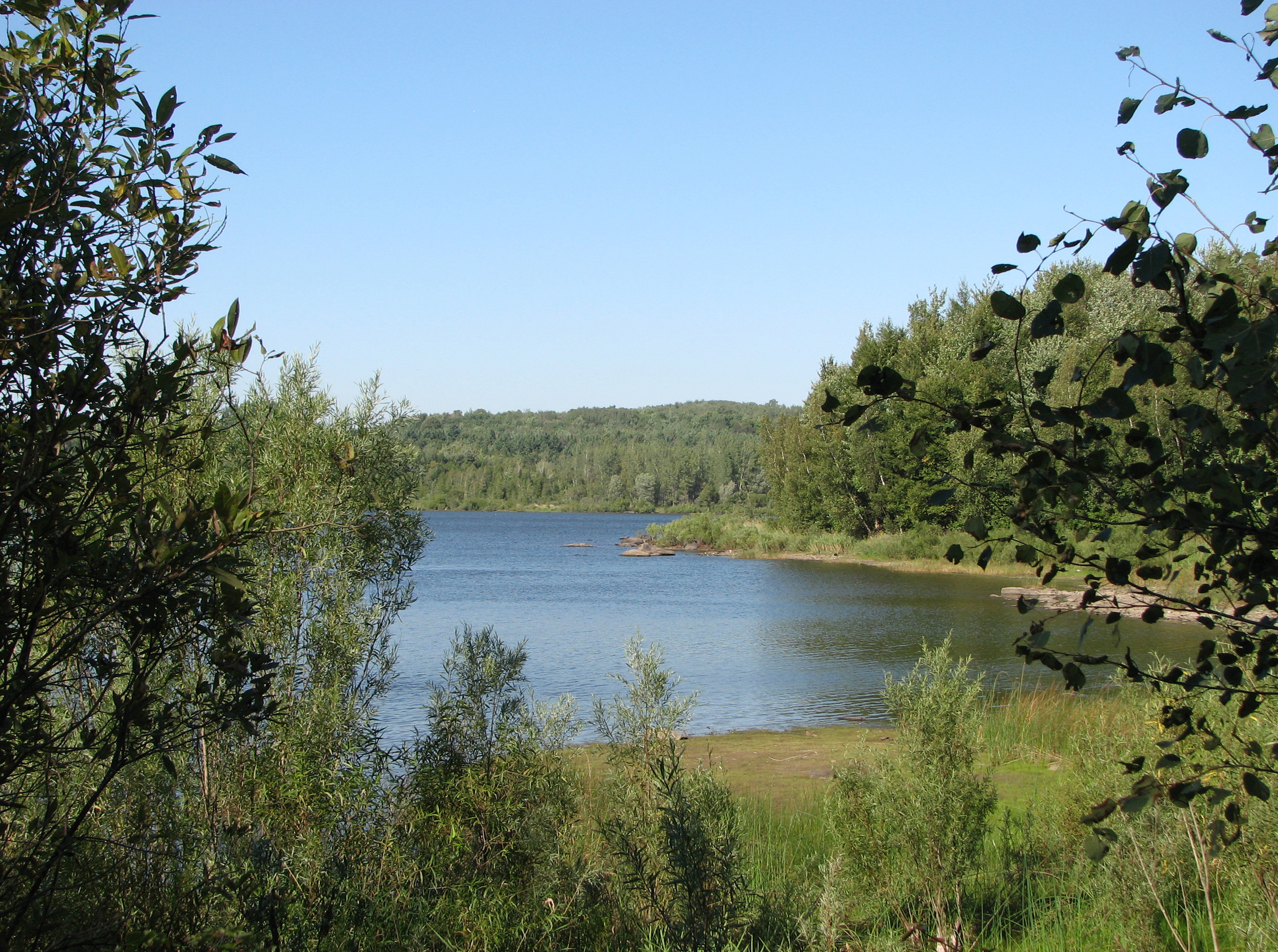
Choinière Reservoir in Yamaska National Park

Yamaska National Park (French: Parc national de la Yamaska, pronounced [paʁk nɑsjɔnal də la jamaska]) is a provincial park centered on the man-made Choinière Reservoir. It is located in the municipalities of Roxton Pond and Saint-Joachim-de-Shefford in La Haute-Yamaska Regional County Municipality, just northeast of Granby, Quebec.

== Activities ==
The park's proximity to Montreal (only 94 km) makes it a popular destination for outdoor activities in all seasons. The 4.5 square kilometre Choinière Reservoir, which offers swimming, boating, and fishing was created on the North Yamaska River in 1977. There is a 19 km walking and cycling trail around the reservoir, and several other hiking trails. There are 147 campsites in the park.

== Geography ==
The park covers an area of 12.9 square kilometres of Appalachian Lowlands habitat. Its undulating hilly landscape is supported by slate and sandstone bedrock. The main soil is a stony sandy loam podzol which has been mapped as the Racine series—one of the most acidic soils in the area. The soil's acidity and stoniness let few farmers enjoy long-term success. Most of the land either remained in forest or was allowed to be reclaimed by trees.

== Flora and Fauna ==
Sugar maple, red maple, balsam fir, eastern hemlock, gray birch, white pine, American elm and basswood are among the 40 tree species found in the park. Among the vulnerable plant species found there are wild leek, wild yellow lily, bloodroot and large-flowered bellwort. There are also 16 amphibian species, 5 reptile species, 40 mammal species and more than 240 bird species. The reservoir has 19 species of fish. The park has chosen the Northern Dusky Salamander as its emblem due to its relative rarity in Quebec.

== See also ==
- Mont Yamaska
- National Parks of Quebec
