= Eastern Townships =

Region in south-eastern Quebec, Canada

Coordinates: 45.4814°N 71.6678°W

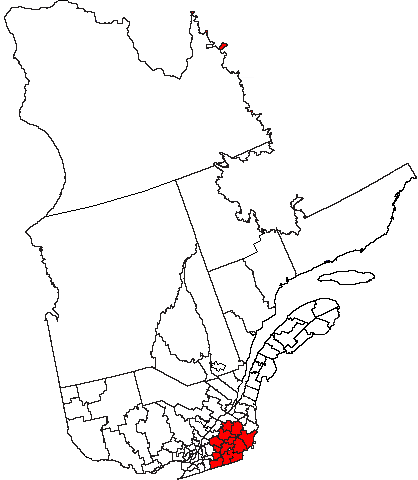
- Country: Canada
- Province: Quebec

Area
  - Total: 12,500 km^{2} (4,800 sq mi)

Population 2021 Canadian census
  - Total: 337,701
- Postal code: J
- Area code: 819
- Website: www.easterntownships.org

The Eastern Townships (French: Cantons de l'Est, pronounced [kɑ̃tɔ̃ də lɛst]) is a historical administrative region in southeastern Quebec, Canada. It lies between the St. Lawrence Lowlands and the American border, and extends from Granby in the southwest to Drummondville in the northeast. Its largest city is Sherbrooke. Since 1987, most of the area is within the administrative region of Estrie, which covers nearly 12,500 km² and is composed of eight regional county municipalities (MRCs) along with the city of Sherbrooke. With the exception of its eastern portion around Lake Mégantic and the upper Chaudière River, the region largely corresponds to the middle and upper basin of the Saint-François River, fed by major lakes such as Lake Memphrémagog, Lake Magog, Lake Massawippi, Lake Aylmer, and Grand Lake Saint-François.

== History ==
1839 Map of the eastern townships of Lower Canada, drawn from actual survey

The Abenaki, of the Wabanakiak First Nations, were the first inhabitants and lived in this geographic territory for centuries before European colonization. Their ancestral land, called Ndakina, comprises the area south of the St. Lawrence River from the eastern seaboard of the Atlantic Ocean to the Richelieu River and northward to the Gaspé Peninsula. This is also attested by many toponyms such as Lake Memphremagog and the Massawippi River.

Until 1791 the region was organized under the seigneurial system of New France. In 1791 the region was resurveyed under English law. It was divided into counties, which were in turn subdivided into townships.

Settlement by Europeans happened in three waves: first from New England, including some loyalists, then from the British Isles, and finally French-Canadians from surrounding areas. The proximity of the United States explains the arrival of Loyalists at the end of the eighteenth century, especially in the townships bordering Maine, New Hampshire, and Vermont.

In 1792 the area was designated as the electoral county of Buckinghamshire. The first of 95 townships to be granted was Dunham, established in 1796, followed by Potton, Bolton, and Brome, all in 1797. Over the following years, the territory became known as the “Eastern Townships of Lower Canada”, in contrast to the “Western Townships” of Upper Canada, and by 1806 the name “Eastern Townships” was commonly used. The French terminology shifted over time, first appearing as Townships de l’Est around 1833 and later as Cantons de l’Est in 1858.

During the first half of the 19th century, the Eastern Townships developed into a distinctive anglophone society shaped by migration from New England as well as from the British Isles. Many of the earliest settlers were Loyalists or their descendants, joined later by other New England farmers seeking affordable land. They were followed in significant numbers by immigrants from Scotland, Ireland, and England, which created an unusually diverse population for a rural Quebec region. This mix of backgrounds fostered communities where English predominated for much of the century, setting the Townships apart from surrounding francophone districts. The settlement pattern also produced a diverse combination of small villages, family farms, and local markets, reflecting both American and British traditions.

Religion reinforced this diversity. Protestant denominations, especially Methodist, Baptist, and Anglican congregations, played a major role in village life, building schools, churches, and community institutions. At the same time, French Canadian Catholics gradually migrated into the region from neighboring parishes, altering the balance by the late nineteenth century. The coexistence of these groups often created a “borderland” identity, where loyalties and traditions overlapped. By the turn of the twentieth century, the Townships were no longer overwhelmingly anglophone.

From 1967 to 1981 the Eastern Townships were an administrative region of Quebec (région 05). In 1981 the Commission de toponymie du Québec renamed it Estrie. The toponym Estrie had first been proposed in 1946 by Monsignor Maurice O’Bready, then secretary-general of the Société historique des Cantons de l’Est (today the Sherbrooke History Museum). He derived it from the root est combined with the suffix -trie, found in old Romance toponyms such as Neustrie, and explained it as evoking both 'east' and a 'fertile land'. The term Estrie officially replaced Cantons de l’Est in 1981, though its usage continues to generate debate.

In 1987, during the reorganization of the regional county municipalities, the region lost some territory:

- Arthabaska, Drummond, and parts of the counties of Wolfe and of Mégantic, moved to Centre-du-Québec.
- the remainder of Mégantic moved to Chaudière-Appalaches.
- Shefford and Missisquoi moved to Montérégie.

Although counties were abolished, some survive as regional county municipalities, including Arthabaska, Brome, Compton, Frontenac, Missisquoi, and Shefford. Townships which survive as municipalities include Cleveland, Hampden, Hatley, Lingwick, Marston, Melbourne, Orford, Memphrémagog, Potton, Saint-Camille, Sainte-Edwidge-de-Clifton, Stanstead, Stratford, Thetford, Valcourt, and Westbury.

Today, the tourist region marketed as the Cantons-de-l’Est generally corresponds to the modern Estrie administrative region, while the historical definition of the Eastern Townships is broader, extending from the Richelieu River to the Beauce and including areas now part of Centre-du-Québec and Montérégie.

== Notable people with a connection to the Eastern Townships ==
- Archibald McKillop
- Andrew Paton
- Benjamin Cate Howard
- Louise Penny
- William Henry Jeffrey
- Bernard Lemaire

== See also ==
- Bishop's University
- Demographics of Quebec
- Eastern Townships School Board
- Elmwood Cemetery (Sherbrooke)
- Harry Kendall Thaw
- History of Quebec
- Irish Quebecers
- Scots-Quebecers
