= West Bolton =

West Bolton Bolton-Ouest
- Municipality
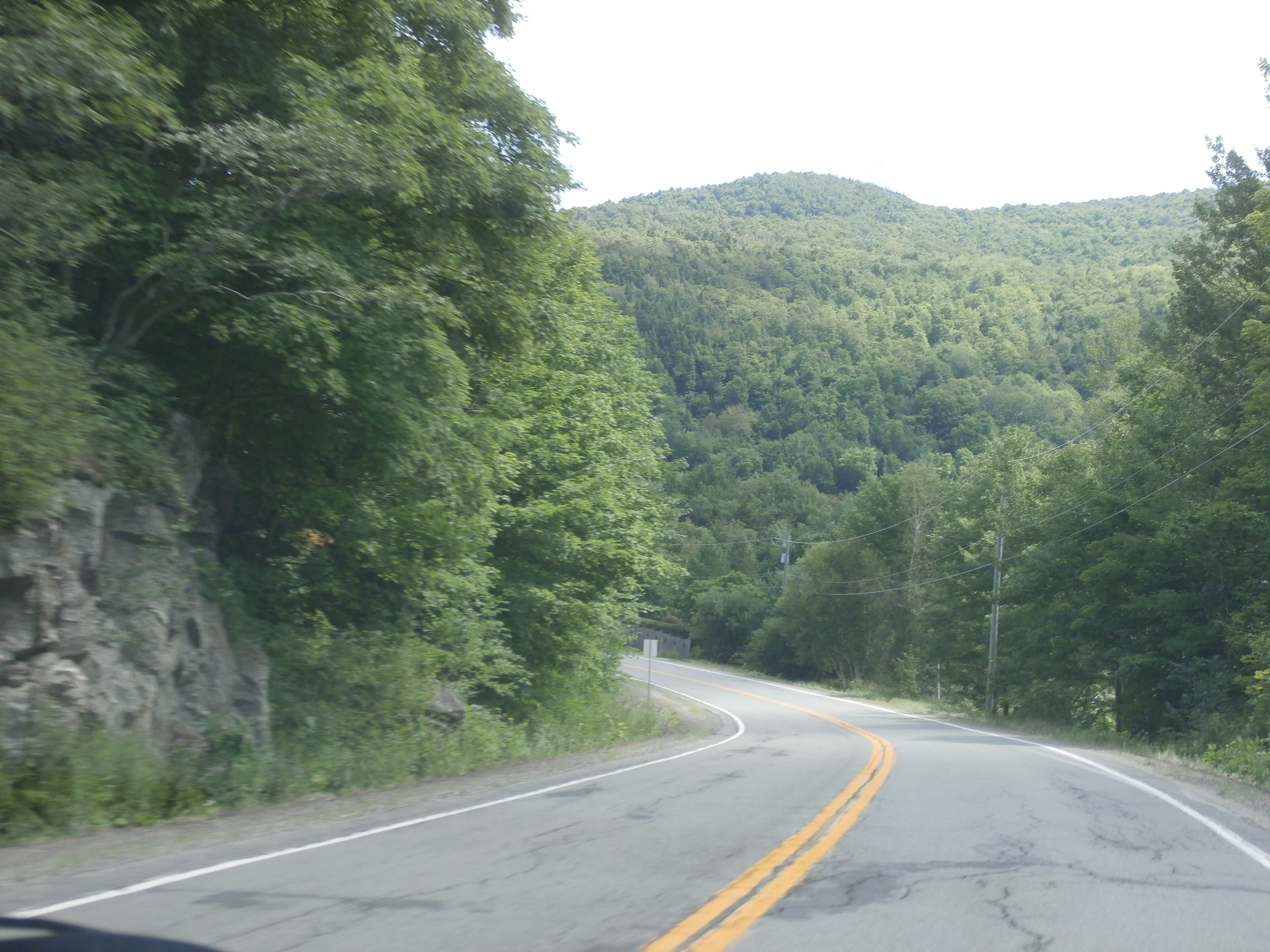

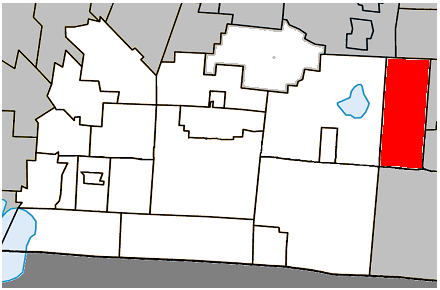
- Location within Brome-Missisquoi RCM

- Location in southern Quebec
- Coordinates: 45°14′N 72°27′W
- Country: Canada
- Province: Quebec
- Region: Estrie
- RCM: Brome-Missisquoi
- Constituted: December 28, 1876

Government
  - Mayor: Denis Vaillancourt
  - Federal riding: Brome—Missisquoi
  - Prov. riding: Brome-Missisquoi

Area
  - Total: 102.20 km^{2} (39.46 sq mi)
  - Land: 100.94 km^{2} (38.97 sq mi)

Population (2021)
  - Total: 732
  - Density: 7.3/km^{2} (19/sq mi)
  - Pop 2016–2021: ▲16.2%
  - Dwellings: 522
- Time zone: UTC−5 (EST)
  - Summer (DST): UTC−4 (EDT)
- Postal code(s): J0E 2T0
- Area codes: 450 and 579
- Highways A-10: R-243
- Website: bolton-ouest.ca

West Bolton (officially Bolton-Ouest) is a municipality located in the Brome-Missisquoi Regional County Municipality of the Estrie administrative region of Quebec, Canada. The population as of the Canada 2021 Census was 732.

== Demographics ==
=== Population ===
Population trend:

Census	Population	Change (%)
2021	732	▲16.2%
2016	630	▼7.1%
2011	678	▼6.2%
2006	723	▲6.2%
2001	681	▲18.4%
1996	575	▼7.9%
1991	624	N/A

=== Language ===
Mother tongue language (2021)

Language	Population	Pct (%)
French only	345	47.3%
English only	340	46.6%
Both English and French	20	2.7%
Other languages	30	4.1%

== See also ==
- List of anglophone communities in Quebec
- List of municipalities in Quebec
- Bolton-Est, Quebec
