= East Bolton =

East Bolton Bolton-Est
- Municipality
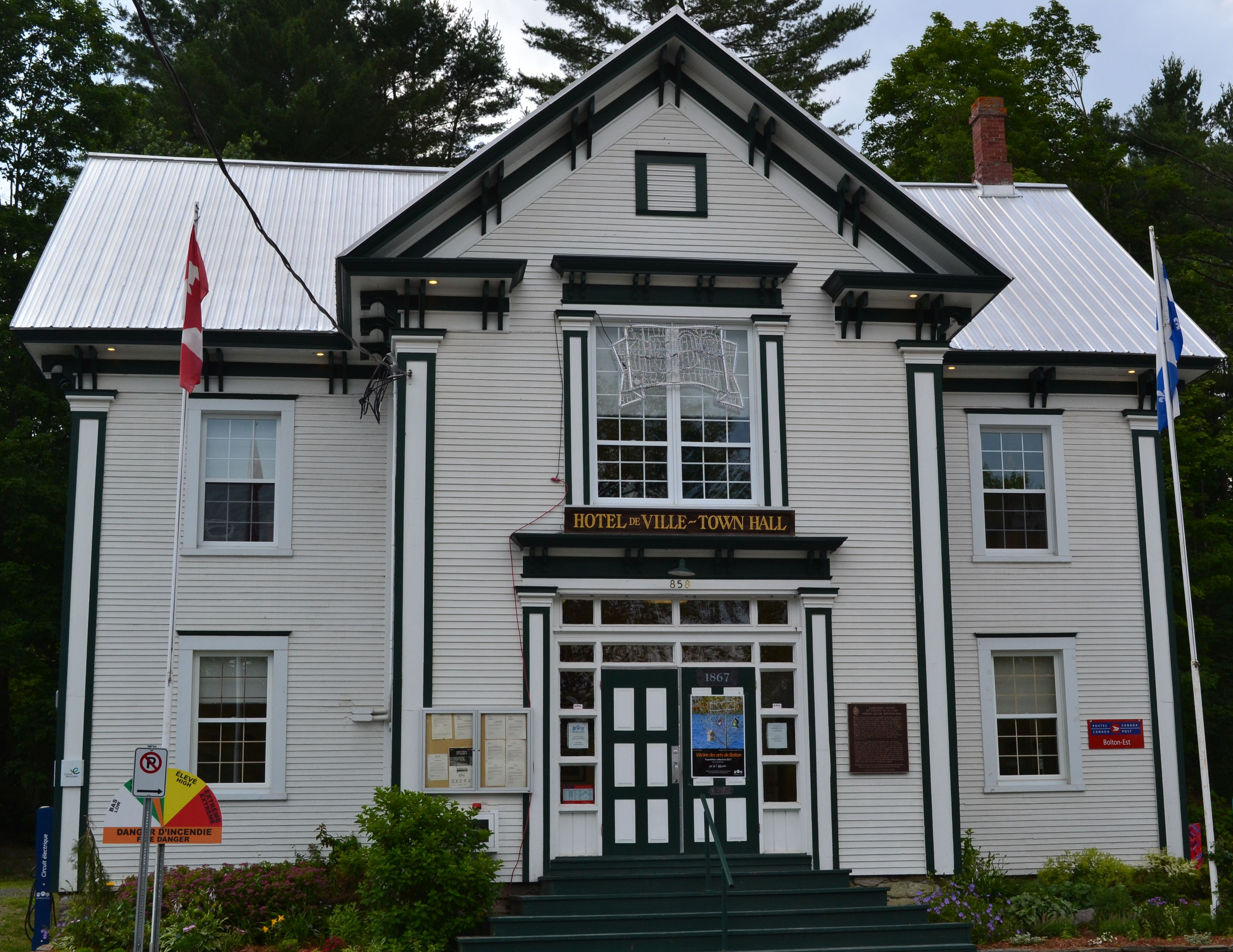
- Town hall

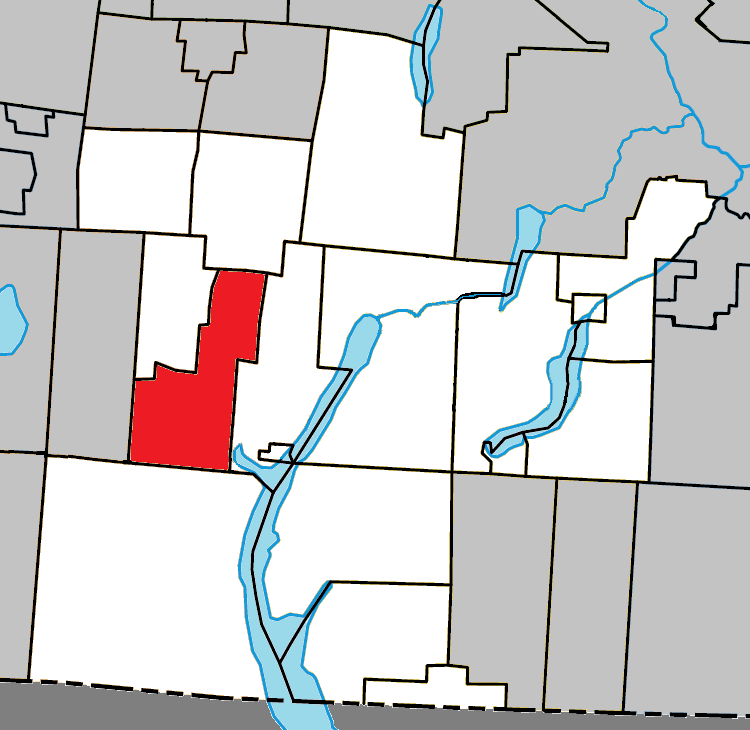
- Location within Memphrémagog RCM

- Location in southern Quebec
- Coordinates: 45°12′N 72°21′W
- Country: Canada
- Province: Quebec
- Region: Estrie
- RCM: Memphrémagog
- Constituted: December 28, 1876

Government
  - Mayor: Royal Dupuis
  - Federal riding: Brome—Missisquoi
  - Prov. riding: Orford

Area
  - Total: 81.60 km^{2} (31.51 sq mi)
  - Land: 79.39 km^{2} (30.65 sq mi)

Population (2021)
  - Total: 1,108
  - Density: 14/km^{2} (36/sq mi)
  - Pop 2016-2021: ▲17.9%
  - Dwellings: 856
- Time zone: UTC−5 (EST)
  - Summer (DST): UTC−4 (EDT)
- Postal code(s): J0E 1G0
- Area codes: 450 and 579
- Highways: R-243; R-245
- Website: www.boltonest.ca

East Bolton (French: Bolton-Est) is a municipality of about 1,000 people, part of the Memphrémagog Regional County Municipality in the Estrie region of Quebec, Canada.

It is the birthplace of Reginald Fessenden, a radio pioneer who developed the foundations of amplitude modulation (AM) technology.

== Demographics ==
=== Population ===
Population trend:

Census	Population	Change (%)
2021	1,108	▲17,9%
2016	940	▲3.3%
2011	910	▲29.3%
2006	704	▲1.0%
2001	697	▲7.1%
1996	651	▲9.4%
1991	595	N/A

=== Language ===
Mother tongue (2021)

Language	Population	Pct (%)
French only	790	71.3%
English only	265	23.8%
Non-official language	30	2.6%
English & French	20	1.7%
English and non-official language	5	0.4%

== See also ==
- List of anglophone communities in Quebec
- List of municipalities in Quebec
- West Bolton, Quebec
