= Mont Shefford =

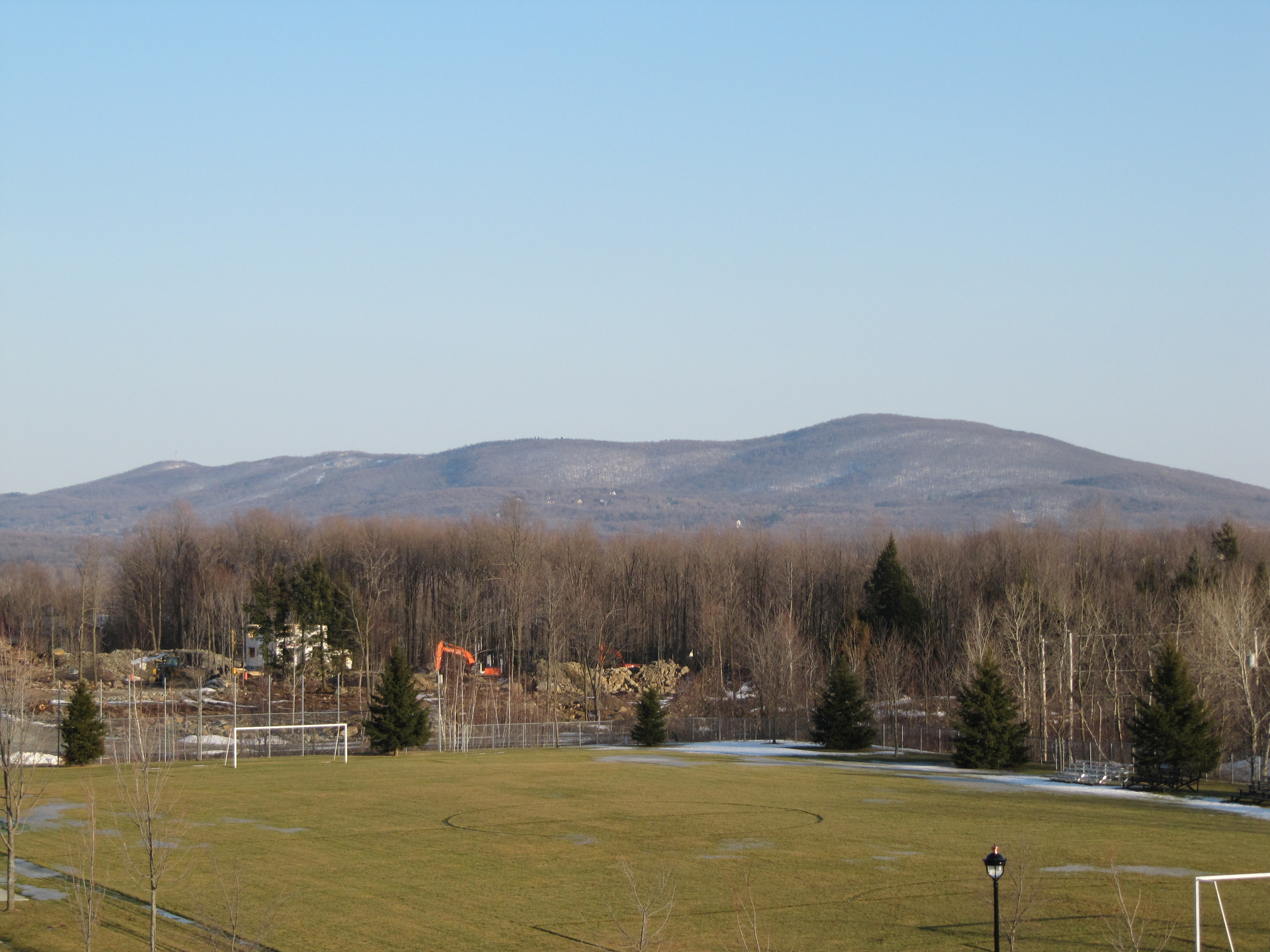
- Mont Shefford seen from Terry Fox Park in Granby

Highest point
- Elevation: 526 m (1,726 ft)
- Coordinates: 45°21′49″N 72°37′33″W

Geography
- Location within Southern Quebec
- Location: Shefford, 12 kilometers southeast of Granby, Quebec, Canada
- Parent range: Monteregian Hills
- Topo map: NTS 31H7 Granby

Geology
- Rock age: Early Cretaceous
- Mountain type: Intrusive stock

Mont Shefford is a Monteregian Hill located in Shefford in the Estrie region of Quebec, Canada.

Mont Shefford is 526 metres (1,726 ft) tall, and was home to the Ski Shefford ski resort which closed in 2006.

== Geology ==
Mount Shefford was formed some 125 million years ago during an underground intrusion of magma. This magma did not reach the Earth's surface and remained in a deep freeze. The mountain appeared following the erosion of nearby sedimentary rocks by glaciers. The sedimentary rock was more fragile than the metamorphic rock formed by the contact of the magma and the surrounding sedimentary rock.

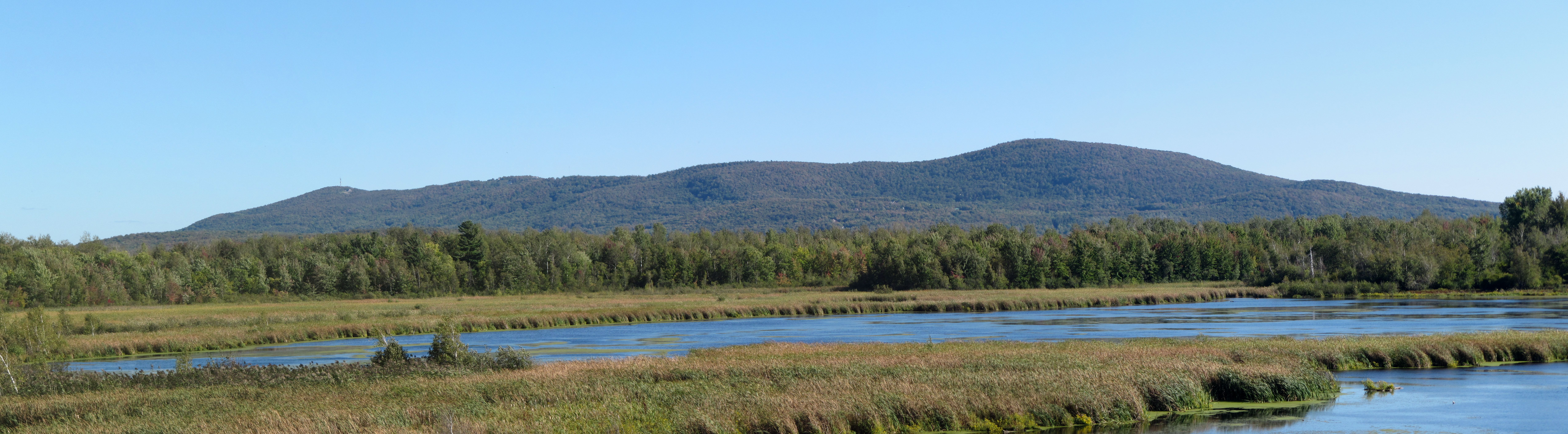
Mont Shefford seen from Lac Boivin in Granby.
