= Missisquoi County, Quebec =

Missisquoi County (/mɪˈsɪskwə/) is a historical county in Quebec. It was formed between 1825 and 1831 and included historical Bedford County, Lower Canada. In the early 1980s Quebec abolished its counties. Much of Missisquoi County became the Brome-Missisquoi Regional County Municipality except the southwestern part was transferred to Le Haut-Richelieu Regional County Municipality.

The name of the county is derived from an Algonquin Abenaki language word meaning "lots of waterfowl".

Missisquoi County, part of the Eastern Townships (one of roughly 12 regions in Québec), is located on the western fringes of the Appalachian foothills, giving it a rolling landscape on its eastern part. The western part of the county is situated on the Richelieu River plains.

Missisquoi County is bound entirely on the south for 51 km by the Canada–US border (45° N) from 72°40.5′ W to the middle of the Richelieu River (73°20.8′ W), to the east by Brome County for 23 km along the meridian defined by 72°40.5′ W, to the northeast by Brome County and the northwest by Rouville County, and to the west by Iberville County and the Richelieu River (Saint-Jean County is on the other side of the river). The northernmost point of the county is at 45°21′ N and 73° W and is also the junction of the borders of Missisquoi County, Rouville County and Iberville County. The westernmost point of the county is on the Richelieu River at the Canada–US border at 45° N and 73°20′ W.

The county is divided into four townships, and there are two discontinuous zones along its western fringes without any township designation divided under the pre-1760 French parochial framework. The townships are the Township of Farnham in the north, Township of Dunham in the east and Township of Stanbridge to the west, and Township of Saint Armand along the Canada–US border. The county seat is the Town of Bedford located at 45°7′ N and 72°59′ W in the southwestern part of the Township of Stanbridge. Other major towns in the county are Farnham in the township of the same name and Cowansville in the northeastern corner of Dunham Township.
