= Denny baronets of Castle Moyle (1782) =

Baronetcy in the Baronetage of Ireland

Denny baronets
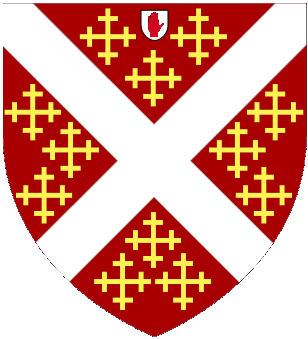
- Escutcheon of the Denny baronets of Castle Moyle
- Creation date: 1782
- Status: extant
- Motto: Et mea Messis Erit, And my harvest shall be
- Arms: Gules a saltire Argent between twelve cross crosslets Or.
- Crest: A cubit arm vested Azure turned up Argent holding in the hand Proper five ears of wheat Or.

The Denny baronetcy, of Castle Moyle (sic) in the County of Kerry, was created in the Baronetage of Ireland on 12 January 1782 for Barry Denny, Member of the Irish Parliament for the county before and after that year, and its Sheriff in 1774.

The 2nd Baronet was killed in a duel in 1794. The 3rd and 4th Baronets represented Tralee in the House of Commons. The 6th Baronet was a founder of the North-West Mounted Police in Canada, Indian agent and author.

== Denny baronets, of Castle Moyle (1782) ==
- Sir Barry Denny, 1st Baronet (c. 1744–1794)
- Sir Barry Denny, 2nd Baronet (died 1794)
- Sir Edward Denny, 3rd Baronet (c. 1773–1831)
- Sir Edward Denny, 4th Baronet (1796–1889)
- Sir Robert Arthur Denny, 5th Baronet (1838–1921)
- Sir Cecil Edward Denny, 6th Baronet (1850–1928)
- Sir Henry Lyttelton Lyster Denny, 7th Baronet (1878–1953)
- Sir Anthony Coningham de Waltham Denny, 8th Baronet (1925–2013)
- Sir Piers Anthony de Waltham Denny, 9th Baronet (born 1954)

The heir presumptive is the present holder's younger brother, Thomas Francis Coningham Denny (born 1956).

== Extended family ==
- The 1st Baronet was a descendant of Sir Anthony Denny, confidant of King Henry VIII.
- The third son of the 7th Baronet was the artist Robyn Denny.

== Misnomer ==
The letters patent creating the baronetcy were in error giving the title as of "Castle Moyle", instead of "Castle More" (Mor or "great" in Irish) signifying Tralee Castle, the family seat in County Kerry.
