= Elmwood Cemetery (Sherbrooke) =

Historic cemetery located in the Old North district of Sherbrooke, Quebec

- Interactive map of Elmwood Cemetery

Details
- Established: 1890
- Location: 1101 Hyatt St. Sherbrooke, Quebec; J1J 4N5
- Country: Canada
- Coordinates: 45.4141°N 71.9063°W
- Type: Public
- Owned by: Elmwood Sherbrooke Inc.
- No. of graves: 7200
- Website: elmwoodcemeterysherbrooke.com

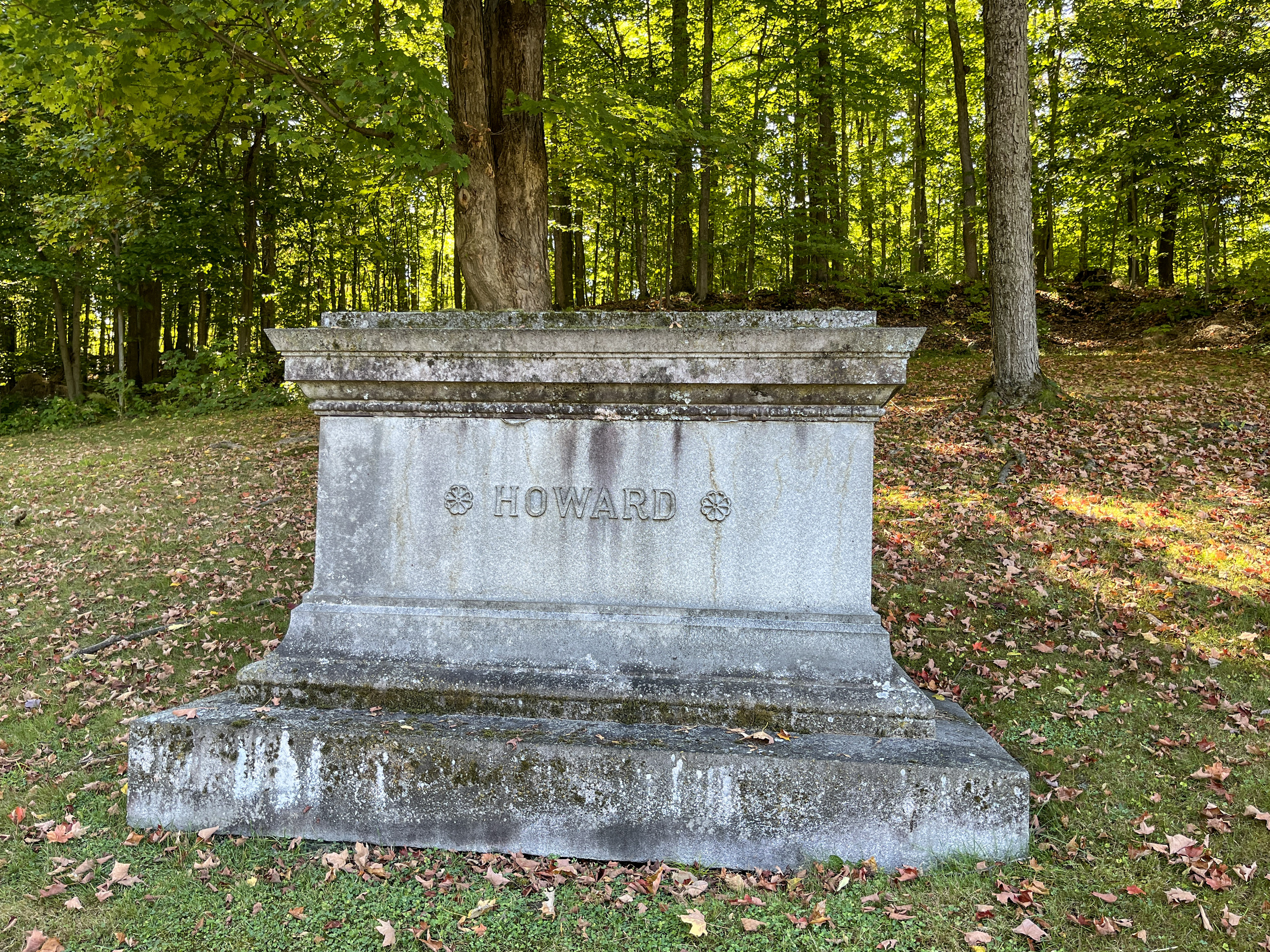
Howard Family tombstone in Elmwood Cemetery.

Elmwood Cemetery is a historic cemetery located in the Old North district of Sherbrooke, Quebec, Canada. Established in 1890, it is recognized for its English garden–style design and as the burial site of numerous figures significant to the political, industrial, and cultural history of the Eastern Townships. The cemetery contains approximately 7,200 gravestones distributed across its hillside grounds.

== History ==
The cemetery was inaugurated in 1890 on Hyatt Street, named for Gilbert Hyatt, the founder of Sherbrooke. Elmwood quickly became the principal burial ground for members of Sherbrooke’s anglophone community.

Between 1908 and 1919, Elmwood was the site of one of the largest reinterment operations in Quebec’s history, following the closure of the Union Cemetery on Belvédère Street. A total of 895 bodies were exhumed, of which 550 were claimed by relatives and reburied in family plots, while 345 (188 adults and 157 children) were placed in a designated section at Elmwood. Around 116 monuments and gravestones were also transferred.

== Notable interments ==
Several prominent individuals are buried at Elmwood Cemetery, including:

- Andrew Paton (d. 1892), industrialist.
- Andrew Stuart Johnson, asbestos industry pioneer.
- Benjamin Cate Howard, lumber merchant.
- George Foote Foss (d. 1968), inventor of the first gasoline-powered automobile in Canada.
- James Simpson Mitchell (d. 1920) and his wife Isabella McKekhnie (d. 1941).
- Lady Mary Louisa King, wife of Sir Joseph-Adolphe Chapleau, the fifth premier of Quebec.
- Samuel Brooks and Charles Benjamin Howard, Members of Parliament and Senators.
- William Bullock Ives (d. 1899), judge.
- William Farwell Jr., president of the Eastern Townships Bank.

The cemetery also contains a communal grave dedicated to soldiers who died during the First World War, established in 1939 by the Imperial Order Daughters of the Empire. Other communal graves include sections associated with local Freemason lodges, reflecting their prominence in the region during the 19th century.

== Features ==
Elmwood Cemetery is designed in the style of an English garden, with winding paths and landscaped hills. It remains in active use, with an average of thirty burials or interments annually, most of them cremation urns.

== See also ==
- List of cemeteries in Canada
- Sherbrooke History Museum
