= Cecil Denny =

Cecil Denny may refer to:

- Cecil Denny (golfer) (1908–1991), English golfer
- Sir Cecil Denny, 6th Baronet (1850–1928), police officer, Indian agent and author in Edmonton, Canada
