= Archibald Denny =

Scottish naval architect (1860–1935)

Sir Archibald Denny Bt FRSE
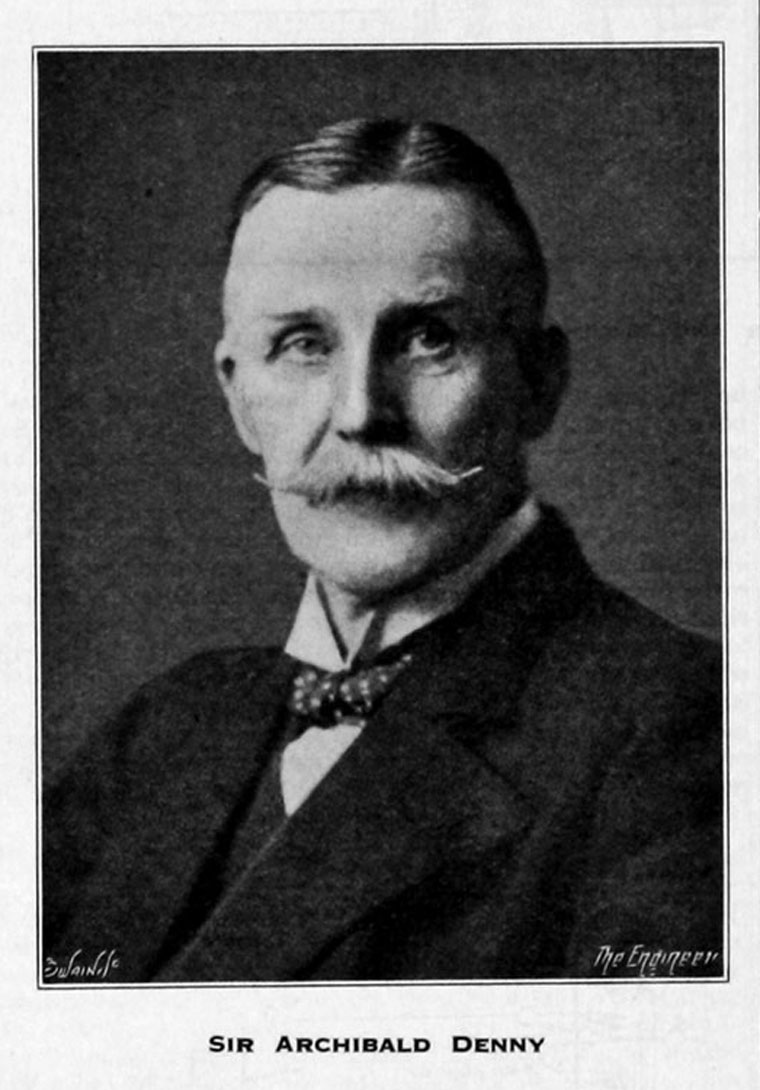
- Archibald Denny, c.1910
- Born: Archibald Denny; February 7, 1860; Dumbarton, Scotland
- Died: May 29, 1935 (aged 75); London, UK
- Occupation: Naval Architect
- Years active: 1883-1935
- Known for: owner of William Denny and Brothers
- Spouse: Margaret Tulloch (m. 1885)
- Children: 6
- Parents: Peter Denny (father); Helen Leslie (mother)

Sir Archibald Denny, 1st Baronet FRSE LLD (1860–1935), was a Scottish naval architect who was owner of the major Clyde shipbuilding company William Denny and Brothers, and interested himself directly in the design of ships. He was granted a baronetcy in 1913, the first of the Denny baronets of Dumbarton.

Denny was president of the Institute of Marine Engineers. The company, usually simply referred to as Dennys, had the highest output and tonnage of any of the Clyde shipbuilders, ranking them as one of the world’s largest companies at that time.

Glasgow University award an Archibald Denny Prize annually to the best Naval Architecture student. This was granted in 1912 during Denny's lifetime, and the prize includes money intended for foreign travel.

== Life ==
Denny was born on 7 February 1860, the fourth son of Peter Denny FRSE of Denny Brothers, shipbuilders in Dumbarton, and his wife Helen Leslie. The family was enormously rich being involved in the then (19th century) very safe industry of shipbuilding. His early education was at Dumbarton Burgh School. In 1874 he was sent to Lausanne in Switzerland to complete his education at a private school.

Unlike his brothers, Archibald felt a need to stimulate his mind, whilst still involving himself in the family business. He therefore went to London to engage in specific training as a naval architect at the Royal Naval College, Greenwich. This brought a "hands-on" relationship between shipyard owner and design. He brought a practicality to designs, often absent in competitors, setting them up well for the more commercial elements of ship design. The Oxford Dictionary of National Biography summarised this as "technical excellence".

In 1883 the ownership of the family shipbuilders passed to Archibald (aged only 23). In the same year Archibald took over the shipyard in Leven, Fife, and introduced the world’s first hydromechanical experimentation laboratory: including a large tank for testing the properties of model ships. In 1885 he brought in John Ward to assist in the management, and in 1895 a cousin, Col Leslie Denny. Under Archibald’s control the company began to specialise in ferries and refrigerated ships (Reefer ships). In 1905 the company further broadening seeking and gaining lucrative Admiralty contracts for torpedo-boats, submarines, destroyers and hospital ships. One branch of the company also began building military fighter aircraft.

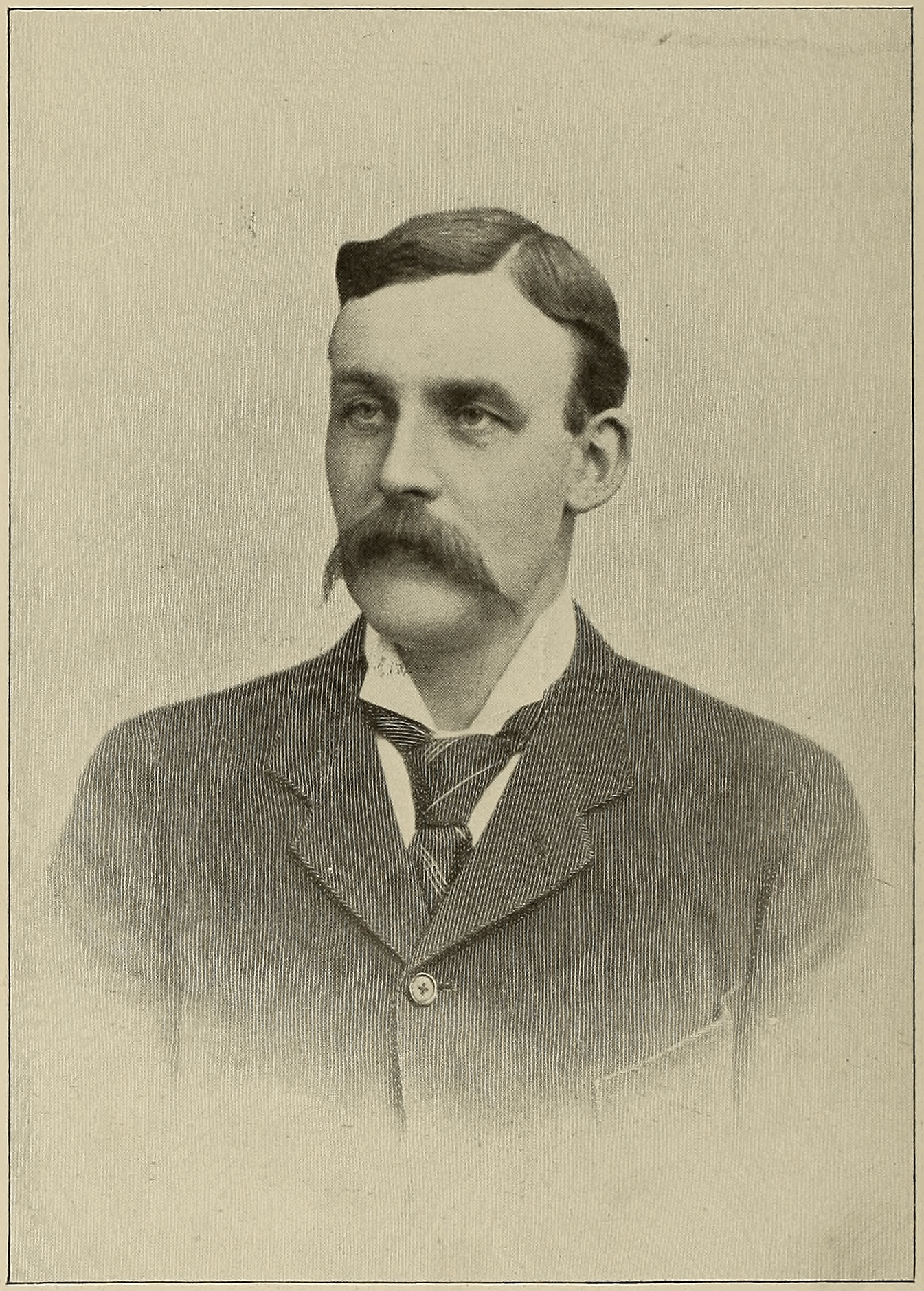
Denny in 1897

In 1894 he was elected a fellow of the Royal Society of Edinburgh. His proposers were John Henderson, Sir John Murray, Alexander Buchan, and Alexander Crum Brown. He was awarded honorary doctorates (LLD) from both Glasgow University (in 1911) and Cambridge University (in 1927). He was created First Baron of Dumbarton in 1913. He was a keen military volunteer and rose to the rank of lieutenant colonel in first the Dunbartonshire Volunteers then the Argyll and Sutherland Highlanders.

From 1903 to 1905 Denny was president of the Institution of Engineers and Shipbuilders in Scotland. In 1912 he was appointed onto the investigatory committee set up by the Board of Trade on the Titanic disaster which had sent shock waves through the shipbuilding world. The committee did not reach any final conclusions until 1915. He thereafter represented Britain at the International Conference on the Safety of Life at Sea.

In 1918 the company became a limited company, William Denny and Brothers Ltd. After a slight dip in orders from 1920 to 1923, things revived with further work from the Admiralty and from Canadian Pacific. Commercial production drifted from ferries to cargo-liners.

In 1921 he moved to London to look after the company’s shipping interests in that city. He died in London on 29 May 1935.

== Family ==
He was married to Margaret Tulloch, daughter of John Tulloch, in 1885. They lived at Braehead House in Dumbarton. They had five sons and one daughter.

Their eldest son, Maurice Edward Denny (1886–1965) took partnership in William Denny and Brothers in 1911. On the death of his father Archibald he became the 2nd Baronet.

== Ships built under Archibald Denny ==
See

- SS Princess Henrietta (1888) (for Belgium)
- PS Princess Josephine (1888)
- PS Leopold II (1888)
- PS Duchess of Hamilton (1890)
- PS Princess Victoria (1890) built as the Larne to Stranraer Ferry
- PS Princess May built as a sister ship to Victoria due to increased ferry demand (1892)
- TSS Duke of York (1894) a ferry serving Fleetwood to Belfast
- TSS Seaford (1894) a cross-channel ferry which sunk in 1895
- TSS Sussex (1895) to replace the Seaford
- TSS Dover (1895)
- TSS Calais (1895)
- TSS Lord Hamilton (1895)
- SS Lord Warden (1896)
- PS Walton Belle (1897)
- Shamrock I a manganese-bronze yacht for Sir Thomas Lipton launched in 1900
- SS Bavarian (1899) a troopship for South Africa as part of the Boer War effort
- SY Lystistrata (1900) for the New York newspaper magnate, James Gordon Bennett Jr.
- Shamrock II (1900) a lower specification luxury yacht to sister Shamrock I for Sir Thomas Lipton
- SS Duchess of Argyll (1906)
- SS Sir Trevredyn Wynne a train ferry for the Bengal-Nagpur Railway in India (1909)
- TB Lady Inchcape (1909)
- TSS Riviera (1911)
- TSS King Edward (1911)
- TSS Queen Alexandria (1911)
- TSS Brighton (1912) as the Newhaven to Dieppe ferry
- TSS Princess Maud (1912) as the Larne to Stranraer ferry
- TSS Londonderry (1912) as the Heysham to Belfast ferry
- TSS Paris (1913) as a sister ship to TSS Brighton, one of the first ferries to achieve 25 knots
- SS Rotomahana (1913) a liner (the first in mild steel)
- SS Buenos Ayres (1913) a liner
- TSS Scot (1913)
- TSS Reva (1913) a troopship bringing troops from India
- TSS Otaki (1913) for New Zealand the first merchant ship with turbines
- TSS Chinduin (1913)
- TSS Infanta Isobel De Barton (1913) for Spain
- TSS Loongana (1913) for New Zealand
- TSS Queen (1913) channel ferry
- TSSs Onward, Invicta, Victoria, and Empress (1914) a fleet of ferries serving the Dover to Calais route
- TSS Curraghmore (1919)
- TSS Fishbourne (1927) a car ferry
- SS Beaverburn (1928)
- TSS Canterbury (1928)
- MS Loch Fyne (1931)

== Arms ==
Coat of arms of Archibald Denny
Crest A dexter hand erect pointing with two fingers at a sun in his splendour all Proper. Escutcheon Azure three suns in their splendour in chief Or and in the honour point a martlet of the last. Motto Fortis Et Benignus

Baronetage of the United Kingdom
New creation	Baronet (of Dumbarton); 1913–1936	Succeeded by Maurice Denny
