= Sir Edward Denny, 4th Baronet =

British politician (1796–1889)

Sir Edward Denny, 4th Baronet (2 October 1796 – 13 June 1889) was an Anglo-Irish baronet and composer of hymns.

== Life ==
He was the eldest son of Sir Edward Denny, 3rd Baronet and Elizabeth Day, daughter of the Hon. Robert Day, judge of the Court of King's Bench (Ireland) and his first wife Mary (Polly) Potts. In 1827, Denny became High Sheriff of Kerry. In 1831, he succeeded his father as baronet and inherited a substantial portion of Tralee. Denny remained unmarried throughout his life. His family motto was "Act Mea Messis Erit" — "in age my harvest shall be".

The following obituary appeared in the 19 June 1889 Leeds Mercury edited by Thomas Blackburn Baines:

Nearly the whole town of Tralee belonged to him. He had an opportunity twenty years ago, when his leases fell in, of raising his rents to figures that, in some cases, would not have been considered extortionate had they been quadrupled (during the Great Hunger in Ireland). He, however, decided to accept the old rents. The result was that he was almost alone in escaping any reduction in the hands of the Land Commission. So far as he was himself concerned, a little money went a long way, but he gave liberally to poor relations and to the development of religious work in connection with the "Brethren". Living in a quiet way in a cottage in Islington, he devoted his time to the study of the prophetic books. His rental income from Ireland was about £13,000 a year.

Denny lived in later years at Bolton Gardens, Kensington and at another time at Islington, being then connected with the Brethren's Priory Meeting Room. He was associated with numerous principal men of the Plymouth Brethren movement including William Kelly, J.G. Bellett, John Nelson Darby, George Wigram. He also participated in the conferences held at Powerscourt House. Denny studied the subject of biblical prophecy and assisted by John Jewell Penstone (1817–1902) prepared valuable charts to illustrate dispensational teaching. The best-known publication was "A Prophetical Stream of Time".

== Hymn writer ==
Denny published his own hymns, in 1839 "A Selection of Hymns" and in 1848, "Hymns and Poems", with new editions in 1870 and 1889. Some of his hymns appeared in "Hymns for the Poor of the Flock" (1840) hymn book. He did not like other editors amending his compositions to suit their tastes or doctrinal foibles. In the preface to "Hymns and Poems" Sir Edward Denny wrote, "I have been much grieved, I confess, to observe how the practice of needlessly altering some even of our well-known favourite hymns has lately prevailed ... should any of these poems or hymns be deemed worthy of a place in any further collections, may they be left as they are without alteration or abridgement".

== Death ==
Denny died aged 93. He was buried at the Paddington Cemetery by the side of George Wigram who had died ten years before. His sister Dianna Denny survived her brother by six months, attaining the age of 85, and was buried with him. On their headstone was engraved the following inscription, "In joyful assurance of rising to an endless day". Today a modern replacement headstone does not have this inscription.

The title passed to Edward's nephew Robert, son of the Reverend Robert Denny.

== Arms ==
Coat of arms of Sir Edward Denny, 4th Baronet
Notes Confirmed by William Hawkins, Ulster King of Arms, 10 January 1782. Crest A cubit arm vested Azure turned up Argent holding in the hand Proper five ears of wheat Or. Escutcheon Gules a saltire Argent between twelve cross crosslets Or. Motto Et mea Messis Erit

== Sources ==
- Chief Men among the Brethren, Hy Pickering.
- Chapter Two Archive, London
- Leigh Rayment's list of baronets
- Leigh Rayment's Historical List of MPs

Parliament of the United Kingdom
Preceded by James Evan Baillie	Member of Parliament for Tralee; 1818–1819	Succeeded by James Cuffe
Baronetage of Ireland
Preceded by Edward Denny	Baronet (of Castle Moyle); 1831–1889	Succeeded by Robert Denny
