= Ernest Cashel =

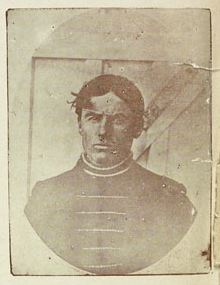
- Ernest Cashel, from his wanted poster in 1903
- Born: c. 1882; Nebraska, United States
- Died: February 2, 1904 (age 21–22); Calgary, Alberta, Canada
- Status: Executed by hanging
- Conviction: Murder
- Criminal charges: Murder, assassination, forgery
- Penalty: Death

Ernest Cashel (c. 1882 – February 2, 1904) was an American-born Canadian outlaw who became famous for his repeated escapes from custody.

== Early crimes and escapes ==
=== 1882–1890s ===
Cashel was born in Nebraska in 1882. When he was 14 he left home and quickly ran afoul of the law. He was arrested and sent to jail twice; both times he escaped. Now a fugitive in the United States, he crossed from Wyoming, through Montana into Alberta, Canada, and worked as a ranch hand at several locations. On October 14, 1902, he was arrested and charged with forgery for passing a bad check. While being transported by train under guard, Cashel escaped out the window of the train's lavatory. A posse was formed by the North-West Mounted Police, but Cashel eluded them.

Several weeks later, on November 19, a man called on police to report his brother-in-law, Isaac Rufus Belt, had gone missing from his ranch east of Lacombe. Upon investigation by the authorities, it was discovered that a young man named Bert Elesworth had been staying at Belt's ranch at the time of the latter's disappearance. From descriptions given of Elesworth, police determined that he was Cashel living under an alias, and began to hunt for him. He was discovered at a camp on the outskirts of Calgary, wearing Belt's clothing, and had in his possession several of Belt's possessions, including a $50 American gold certificate. Cashel was arrested for horse theft, as no body had been found that would allow a charge of murder. He was sentenced to 3 years in prison for the thefts.

On July 20, 1903, a farmer discovered Belt's decomposing body in a river. Examination showed that he had died from a gunshot to the chest, with the bullet found being the same type and caliber as the rifle Cashel carried. Cashel was brought from Stony Mountain Penitentiary back to Calgary to face murder charges in the death of Belt. The trial began on October 19 and lasted until October 27, at which time Cashel was found guilty and sentenced to hang, the execution date being set for December 15. Because of his history of escaping, he was held in a specially-built cell, which kept him separate from the other inmates, and was itself set in one corner of a large room where it could be seen by everyone within. The gallows where Cashel was to hang was visible outside the window.

== Escape from the Mounties ==
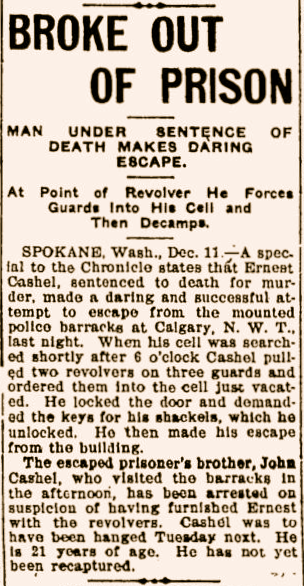
A newspaper reporting his escape.

Cashel's brother John visited nearly every day, and on December 10 he arrived as usual. Under the pretense of a tearful final farewell to his brother – indeed both men were openly weeping – John covertly handed two revolvers to Ernest who concealed them as John left the room. As the guard was being changed from the day shift to the night, Cashel pulled both revolvers and ordered the 3 guards in the room to first disarm themselves, and then to open his cell. He chained the guards up in his cell and left the building.

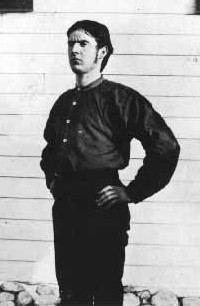
Cashel near a house, circa 1903

John Cashel had left his brother a horse to escape upon, but the animal was spooked by Ernest's rapid approach and broke free, disappearing into the frozen night. Realizing that the cold required him to find shelter quickly, Cashel visited a female acquaintance in Calgary, and demanded she hide him for the night. The pursuing Mounties also realized that Cashel would have to find shelter quickly, and began to search known underworld hangouts.

The next day, the horse that had been readied for Cashel's escape was found. John Cashel confessed to his role in the escape of his brother. He would later be sentenced to two years' imprisonment, while the three guards involved were fired for dereliction of duty. One Mountie called Cashel's escape "the greatest blow the Mounties had received in all their experience."

== Manhunt and capture ==
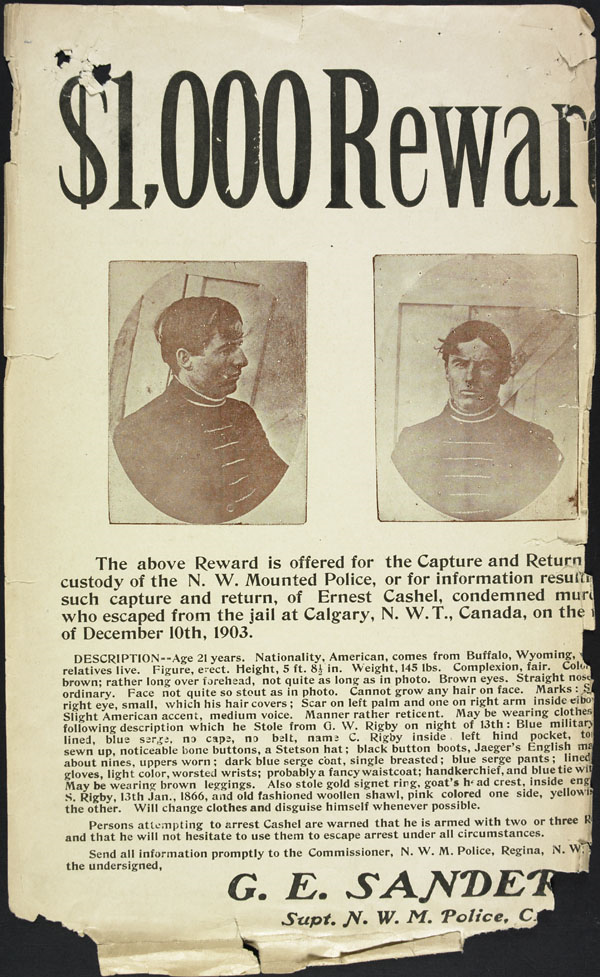
A wanted poster for Cashel

A massive manhunt followed the escape. Reports of sightings of Cashel flowed in from all over Alberta. These would mostly turn out to be false leads, although Cashel was actually seen in Calgary around Christmas. Eventually, the need for food and shelter had Cashel breaking into homes and forcing the occupants to give him food and clothing. These reports helped the Mounties track his movements. It was later learned that Cashel had been keeping track of his own pursuit by following the papers, and indeed had never been more than six miles (9.7 km) from Calgary during his run.

The police received a tip on January 24, 1904, that Cashel was hiding in the cellar of a farmhouse outside of Calgary. A large force was dispatched to apprehend him. Along the way, they searched every structure they came upon, before discovering a haystack in the vicinity of the farmhouse that had been hollowed out with a small living space within. Convinced they were close, a portion of the squad began to search the farmhouse. One officer started to descend to the cellar when a gunshot rang out from below. As the officer backed from the cellar, Cashel pursued and a brief exchange of gunfire was had, during which neither man was hit. Finally Cashel was hit in the foot and retreated back into the farmhouse's cellar.

The main body of the police, alerted to Cashel's presence, quickly surrounded the farmhouse. The inspector in charge decided to burn the house to force Cashel out. As the fire was lit, Cashel called out that he was going to kill himself, and indeed a single gunshot was heard moments later. The police proceeded with the fire regardless, and soon Cashel called out again that he would surrender if he was promised not to be shot. This much was agreed to, and Cashel threw his guns out and surrendered to the Mounties.

== Execution ==
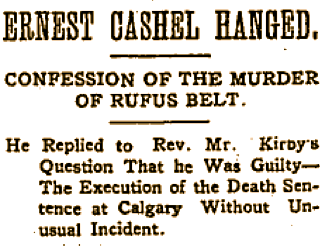
The report of his execution from The Globe and Mail

Cashel was taken into custody and transported back to the same cell that he had escaped from, some 45 days prior. Along the way, he told police that he was completely aware at all times of their actions, and could have escaped back to the United States at any time, but stayed near Calgary in the hopes of rescuing his brother. He was immediately taken before the court, and a new execution date was set for nine days later.

Ernest Cashel was hanged on February 2, 1904, at the North-West Mounted Police barracks in Calgary. He was buried in an unmarked grave, in the potter's field section of Calgary's Union Cemetery.
