= Burnsland Cemetery =

Cemetery in Calgary, Alberta, Canada

Coordinates: 51°01′30″N 114°03′18″W

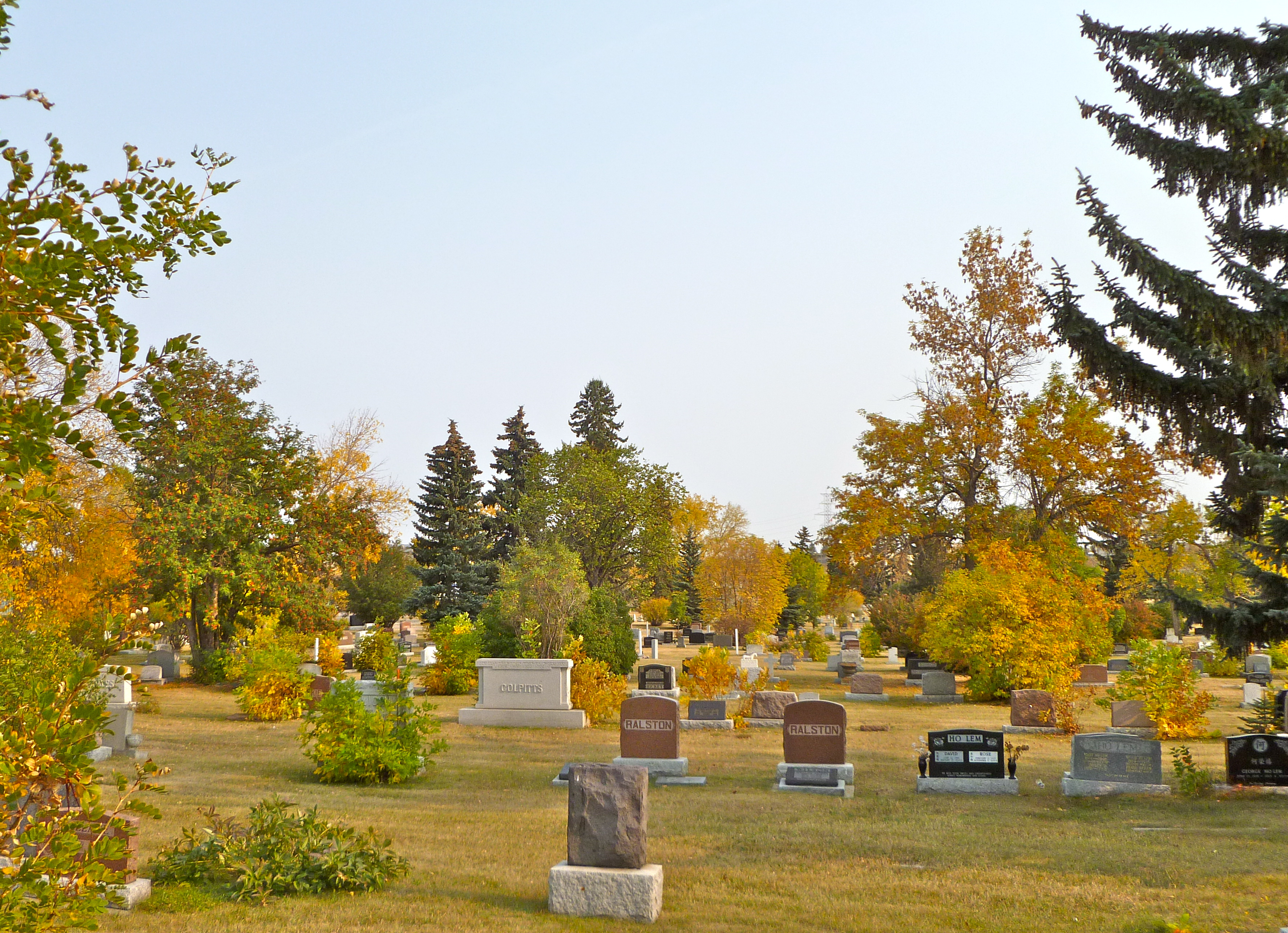

Burnsland Cemetery is a 13 ha (32-acre) urban cemetery in Calgary, Alberta, Canada containing about 22,000 graves. It is located in the city's southeast in the predominantly industrial district of Manchester, and is the burial place for many of Calgary's First World War veterans.

The cemetery is named after Patrick Burns, one of the Big Four founders of the Calgary Stampede. Burns was a local rancher and meat packer who donated the land to the city in 1922. Along with St. Mary's Cemetery, Union Cemetery, Chevra Kadisha (Jewish) Cemetery, and the Chinese Cemetery, Burnsland Cemetery is recognized by Heritage Calgary as a culturally significant historical landscape, and every summer the city offers guided walking tours through the cemetery district.

== History ==
Burnsland Cemetery was established in 1923 when the Union Cemetery established 40 years earlier began to run out of space as the city expanded. It was designed in the style of Victorian garden cemeteries which sought to create a welcoming park-like area for residents to visit. Like the Union Cemetery, many of the city's earliest pioneers and settlers were buried here.

The cemetery contains a field of honour administered by the Commonwealth War Graves Commission where one First World War casualty and 197 Second World War casualties are buried. The majority of the Second World War burials are airmen who died during training at nearby Royal Air Force facilities. The field of honour is also the location of a Cross of Sacrifice, 25 of which are in Canada.

== See also ==
- List of cemeteries in Canada
