= Sir Robert Arthur Denny, 5th Baronet =

Sir Robert Arthur Denny, 5th Baronet (23 July 1838 – 24 November 1921) was an Anglo-Irish baronet and army officer.

== Biography ==
The eldest son of the Rev. Robert Day Denny, vicar of Shedfield, Hampshire and his wife Sarah Grant. He was educated at Harrow School before entering the 22nd (Cheshire) Regiment. In 1872 he married Jane Kirton. The couple had no children.

In 1889 he succeeded his uncle Sir Edward Denny, 4th Baronet to become 5th Baronet of Castle Moyle.

Denny became bankrupt in 1892 and agreed to sell the family estates in County Kerry. In February 1905 he was granted an order of discharge, suspended for two years, in the London Bankruptcy Court with the official receiver stating that the sale of assets had only realised £100. His estate was valued at probate at £11, 7 shillings and sixpence.

He died at Moreton Pinkney, Northamptonshire, aged 83. He was succeeded as baronet by his step brother, Captain Cecil Edward Denny.

== Arms ==
Coat of arms of Sir Robert Arthur Denny, 5th Baronet
Notes Confirmed by William Hawkins, Ulster King of Arms, 10 January 1782. Crest A cubit arm vested Azure turned up Argent holding in the hand Proper five ears of wheat Or. Escutcheon Gules a saltire Argent between twelve cross crosslets Or. Motto Et mea Messis Erit

Baronetage of Ireland
Preceded by Edward Denny	Baronet (of Castle Moyle); 1889–1921	Succeeded by Cecil Denny
