= Andrew Paton (manufacturer) =

Scottish-born Canadian manufacturer and politician

- Born: April 5, 1833
- Died: October 23, 1892 (aged 59)
- Burial place: Elmwood Cemetery (Sherbrooke)
- Occupation(s): Manufacturer, politician
- Children: 6

Andrew Paton (5 April 1833 – 23 October 1892) was a Scottish-born Canadian manufacturer and politician.

Born in Torbrex, Scotland, Paton trained in the woollen industry before immigrating to Canada in 1855. He married Isabelle Moir in 1859. After early ventures in Galt and Waterloo, he moved to Sherbrooke in 1866, where he founded what became the Paton Manufacturing Company. The mill quickly grew into the largest woollen factory in Canada, employing hundreds of workers and contributing to Sherbrooke’s expansion in the late 19th century.

Paton also served on Sherbrooke city council, supported industrial development, and was active in the local board of trade. He died in 1892, and was remembered as a leading figure in both the business and civic growth of the Eastern Townships.

== See also ==
- History of Quebec
- Lower Canada
- Scots-Quebecers
