= William Farwell Jr. =

Canadian banker and politician (1835–1918)

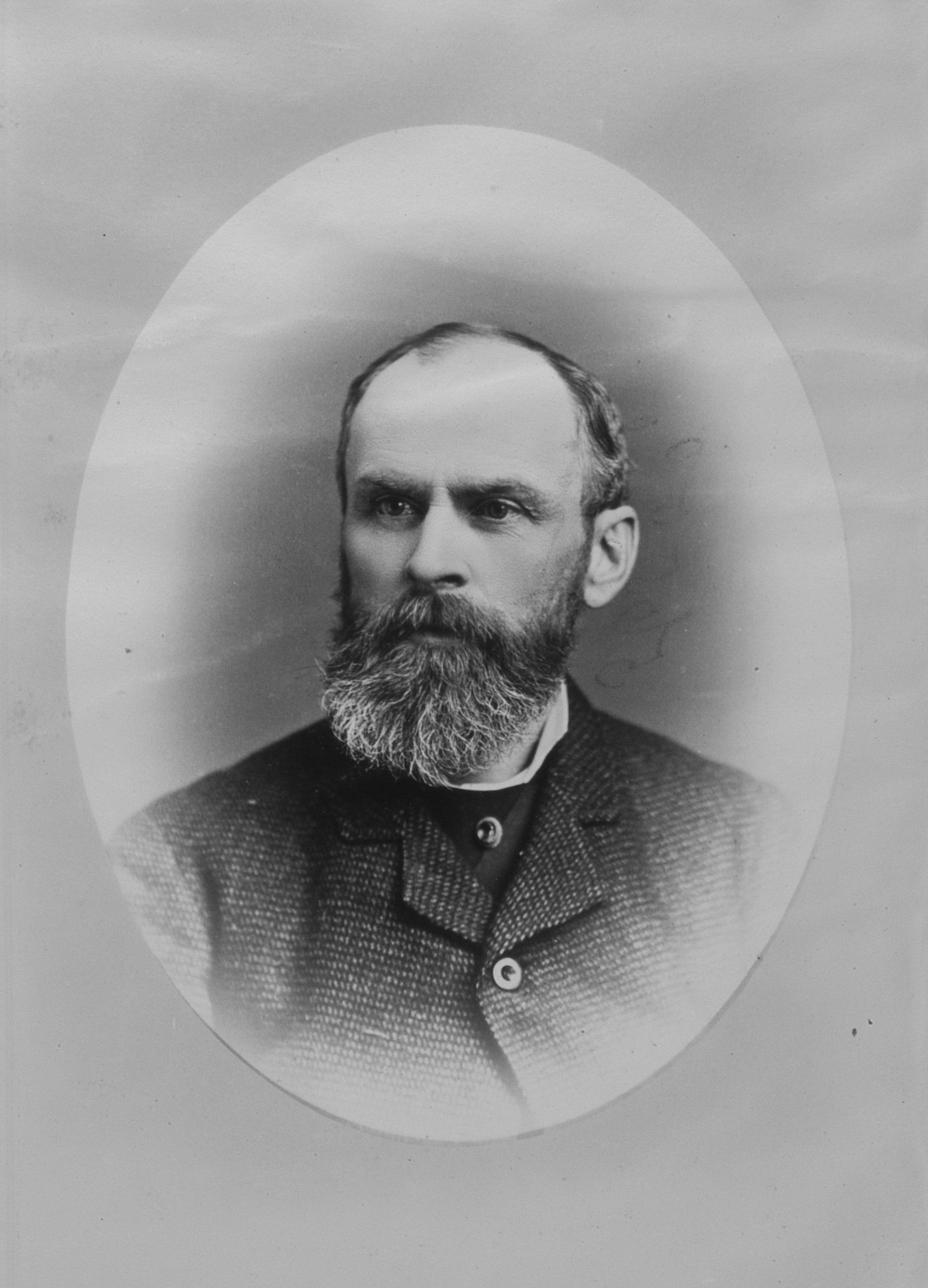
- Born: September 20, 1835
- Died: October 13, 1918 (aged 83)
- Burial place: Elmwood Cemetery (Sherbrooke)
- Occupation(s): Banker, politician.

William Farwell Jr. (20 September 1835–13 October 1918) was a Canadian banker, businessman, and politician from Sherbrooke, Quebec.

== Personal life & career ==
Born in Compton, he was the son of William Farwell and Harriett Carr. He married Elizabeth Jane Winn in 1860, and they had two sons.

Farwell worked in commerce and banking, eventually becoming general manager of the Eastern Townships Bank in 1879 and its president in 1902. He held that position until the bank was merged with the Canadian Bank of Commerce in 1912. His portrait appeared on the bank’s $5 bill in 1873 and the $6 bill in 1906. He also served as vice-president of the Canadian Bankers Association in 1896.

Farwell was active in the region’s business and infrastructure development, helping to promote the St. Francis and Megantic International Railway and investing in pulp and paper companies. He also served as president of Sherbrooke Hospital and sat on several boards.

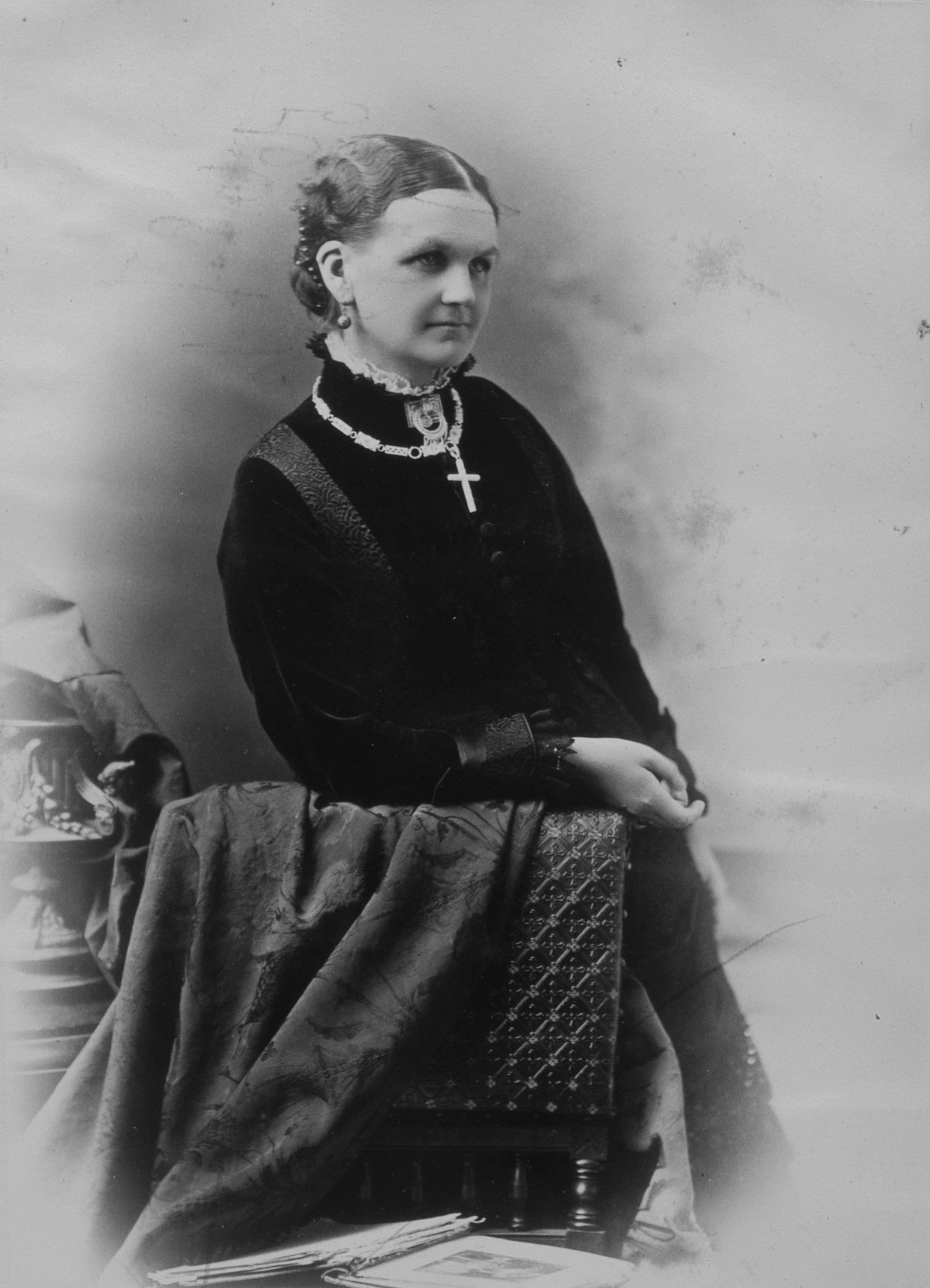
Mrs. W. Farwell taken in William Notman's studio in Montreal in 1880.

In municipal politics, Farwell was mayor of Sherbrooke from 1903 to 1904 and again from 1907 to 1908. During his terms, the city introduced home mail delivery, and a referendum approved municipal control of electric power. In 1907, Bishop’s University awarded him an honorary law degree.

He died in 1918 at his home on Dufferin Street in Sherbrooke and was buried in Elmwood Cemetery. A street in Sherbrooke was named after him in 1948.

== See also ==
- Eastern Townships
- History of Quebec
- List of mayors of Sherbrooke
- Quebec Central Railway
