= Evans-Tipping baronets =

Baronetcy in the Baronetage of the United Kingdom

Escutcheon of the Gwynne-Evans baronets of Oaklands Park

The Gwynne-Evans, later Evans-Tipping Baronetcy, of Oaklands Park in Awre in the County of Gloucester, is a title in the Baronetage of the United Kingdom. It was created on 17 June 1913 for William Gwynne-Evans, director of the Real Estate Corporation of South Africa. He received Royal licence to continue the use of the additional surname of Gwynne, which was that of his maternal grandfather, in 1913.

The 2nd Baronet served as High Sheriff of Gloucestershire in 1943. The 4th Baronet assumed by deed poll the names of Francis Loring Gwynne Evans-Tipping in lieu of those of Francis Loring Gwynne-Evans in 1943; but in 1958 resumed his patronymic of Gwynne-Evans by deed poll. / The 5th Baronet used the surname Evans-Tipping; he did not use his title. As of 2026, the Official Roll marks the title as "dormant".

== Gwynne-Evans, later Evans-Tipping baronets, of Oaklands Park (1913) ==
- Sir William Gwynne-Evans, 1st Baronet (1845–1927)
- Sir Evan Gwynne Gwynne-Evans, 2nd Baronet (1877–1959)
- Sir Ian William Gwynne-Evans, 3rd Baronet (1909–1985)
- Sir Francis Loring Gwynne-Evans, 4th Baronet (1914–1993)
- (Sir) David Gwynne Evans-Tipping, 5th Baronet (1943–2023)
- (Sir) Guy Edward Francis Evans-Tipping, presumed 6th Baronet (born 1978)

The heir apparent is the present holder's son Leo Hector Evans-Tipping (born 2018).

== Notes ==
Baronetage of the United Kingdom
Preceded by Denny baronets	Gwynne-Evans baronets of Oakland Park; 17 June 1913	Succeeded by Furness baronets
