= Peter Denny =

British shipbuilder (1821-1895)

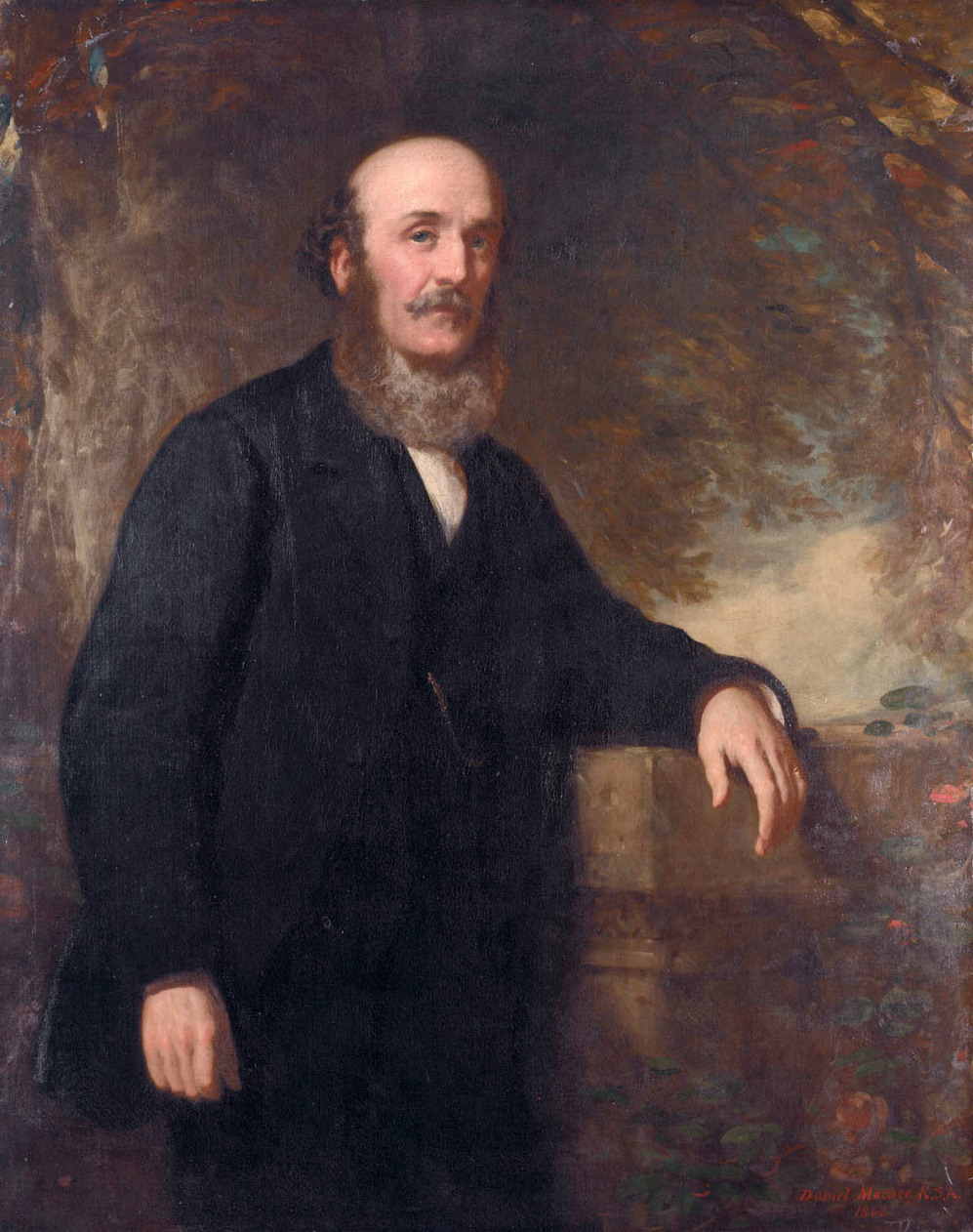
Peter Denny (1821–1895) (Daniel Macnee, 1868)

Peter Denny FRSE LLD (25 October 1821 – 22 August 1895) was a shipbuilder and shipowner based in Dumbarton, Scotland.

== Parents and education ==
Denny was the son of William Denny (1779–1833) and his wife Christeanne Macintyre. He was first apprenticed to a local lawyer and then to the Dumbarton glassworks. Aged 21 he returned to shipbuilding, which was the established family occupation, and worked as a bookkeeper for Robert Napier and Sons.

== Career ==
In 1844 Peter became a junior partner alongside his brothers in Denny Brothers. He was responsible for managing the offices in that business. In 1849 the company was dissolved and reformed as William Denny and Brothers. In partnership with John McAusland and John Tulloch, he formed a marine engineering company in 1850 (Tulloch and Denny). This complimented Denny's shipbuilding operations. William Denny died in June 1854 leaving Peter as the main partner in Dennys, while his other brother James retired in 1862. Tulloch also retired in 1862 and the engineering company was renamed Denny & Company.

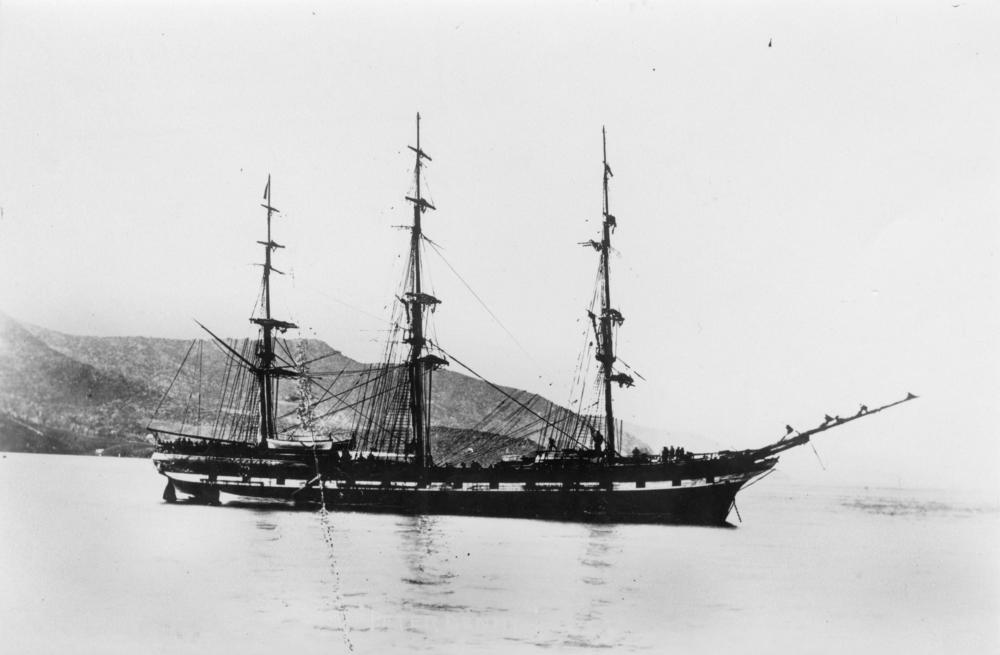
The Peter Denny built 1865 by Duthie of Aberdeen belonged to the Albion company. She operated on the route to New Zealand including carrying emigrants.

Denny appreciated that to succeed as a shipbuilder it was necessary to obtain orders and therefore involved himself in the shipping world. As a member of the Free Church of Scotland he contributed towards the Free Church settlement in New Zealand and came in contact with Paddy Henderson & Co. He became a partner in their shipping interests, resulting in orders for Denny's for new ships.

In 1859 Denny's expanded into the North Yard and the engine works was enlarged. In 1864 some ground was obtained on the eastern side of the river opposite the original shipyard which remained the property of William Denny's estate. The western yard was surrendered and all operations transferred to the new Leven shipyard by 1867. In 1871 Peter served on the parliamentary committee on the design of warships and in 1876 on the Royal Commission into loss of life and property at sea.

Denny's engaged in a profitable business constructing blockade runner ships during the American civil war and purchased large shareholdings in the Irrawaddy Flotilla Company and Albion shipping company. This led to further orders for ships specially designed to operate in the shallow Irrawady River in Burma.

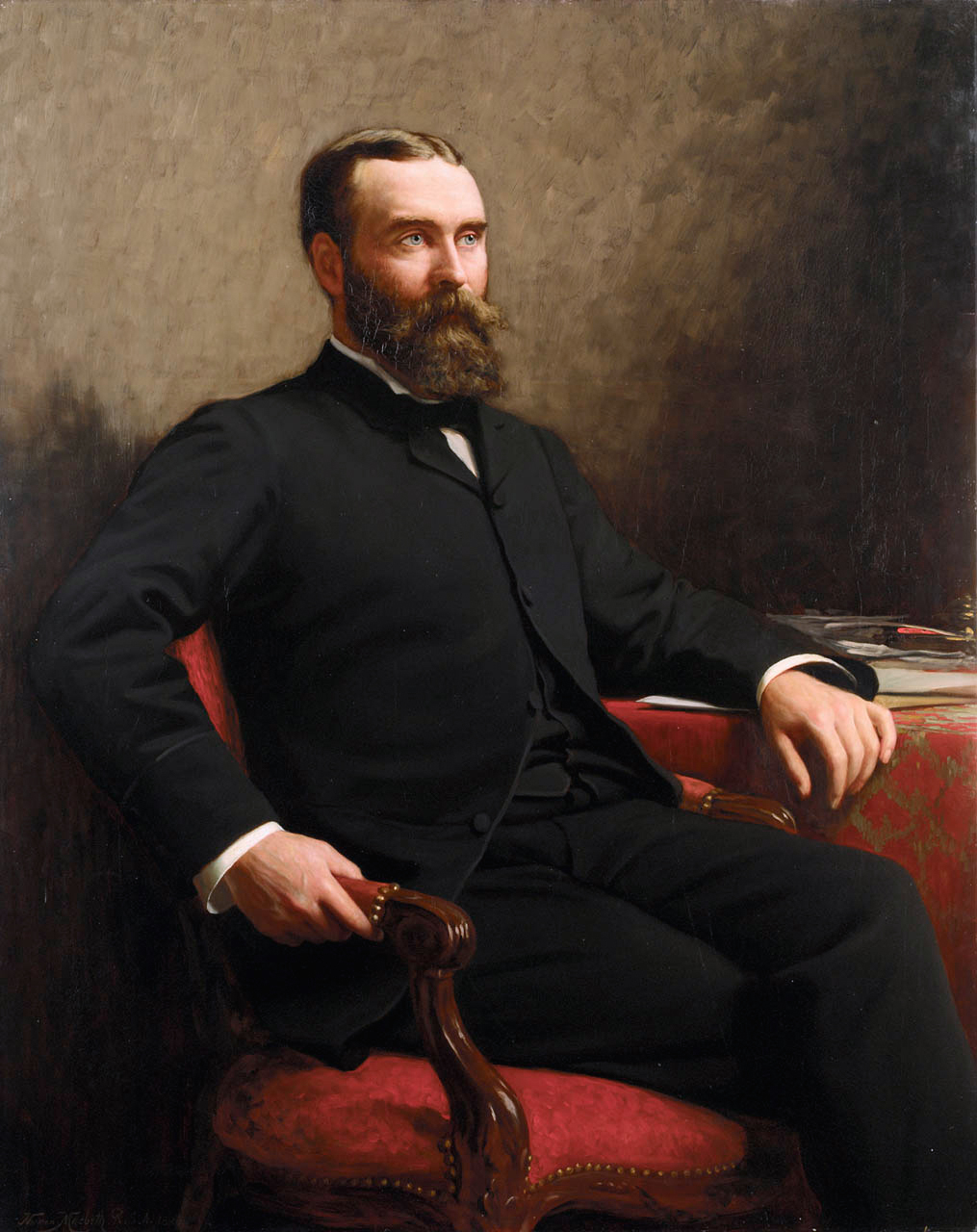
William Denny (1847–1887) (Norman MacBeth, 1888)

Peter's eldest son William Denny FRSE (1847–1887) became a partner in the company in 1868 and eventually took over management. He was particularly interested in hull design and was responsible for the construction of the companies testing tanks in 1881 for trialling models of hull designs before construction. Peter now took more interest in diversifying his interests, including becoming a director of Paddy Henderson, British & Burmese Steam Navigation Company, Albion shipping and Rio Tinto Mines. He sought out orders from foreign governments including Spain, Portugal and Belgium and took a financial interest in encouraging local industry. He donated large amounts of money to local hospital charities and to establish educational scholarships. In 1890 he was awarded an honorary doctorate (LLD) by Glasgow university to recognise his charitable works for education.

In 1876 he was elected a Fellow of the Royal Society of Edinburgh. His proposers were William Thomson (Lord Kelvin), Anderson Kirkwood, Allan Thomson and David Stevenson.

On 17 March 1887 William Denny committed suicide in Buenos Aires following disastrous investments in La Platense Flotilla company in 1882. Following his son's death, Peter retired further from his business interests, dying at the family home Helenslee in Dumbarton on 22 August 1895. He left an estate of £200,000 though his lifetime earnings were in the region of £1.5 million (approximately multiply by 100 for 2012 values).

== Family ==
Peter married Helen Leslie on 26 January 1846. They had eight sons, including Colonel John McAusland Denny and Sir Archibald Denny, and seven daughters.

Helen died on 5 March 1905.

== Tributes ==
Peter Denny is the eponymist of the annual Denny Medal by IMarEST.

A statue of Denny, sculpted by Sir Hamo Thornycroft and erected in 1902, stands in front of the Dumbarton Municipal Buildings.
