= Union Cemetery (Calgary) =

Cemetery in Alberta, Canada

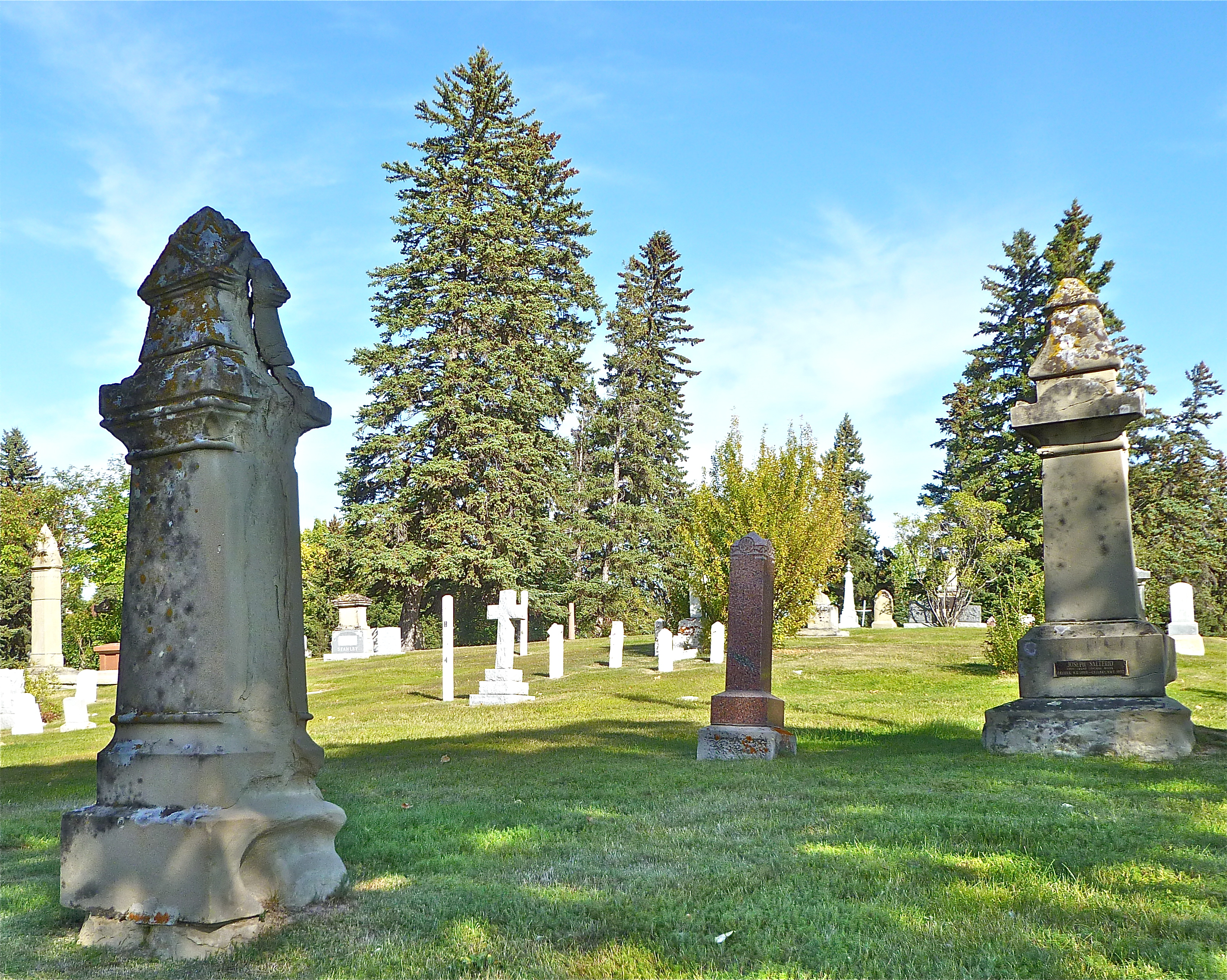
- Graves at Union Cemetery
- Interactive map of Union Cemetery

Details
- Established: 1890
- Location: Calgary, Alberta
- Country: Canada
- Coordinates: 51°01′40″N 114°03′25″W
- Type: Public
- Size: 19 ha (47 acres)
- No. of graves: 21,000+

Union Cemetery is a public cemetery in Calgary, Alberta, Canada. Established in 1890, it is Calgary's first Protestant cemetery and contains the graves of many of the city's earliest pioneers and settlers. Its grounds include a military field of honour and Reader Rock Garden, a National Historic Site of Canada developed from the former superintendent's residence and garden.

== History ==
Shortly after Calgary was incorporated in 1884, the town council determined that a Protestant cemetery was needed to complement the existing Roman Catholic graveyard. In 1885 a cemetery was established at Shaganappi Point, west of the town, but the distance from town and rocky soil forced the council to look for a better location. Between 1885 and 1890 approximately 75 people were buried at the Shaganappi Point cemetery.

In 1890, council purchased farmland south of the town, across the Elbow River, from Augustus Carney, an early settler in the area. As part of the agreement, Carney continued to live on and farm part of the land for two years, and was responsible for monitoring the condition of the fence and closing the gates at the end of each day. The first interment in the new cemetery was Angus Robertson, Calgary's first Presbyterian minister, on September 4, 1890. By 1892, the Shaganappi Point cemetery had been abandoned and fallen into disrepair. That summer, council offered a free plot and grave digging to anyone willing to move remains from Shaganappi Point to the new cemetery, although reinterments continued until 1912.

In 1902, a group of plot owners and prominent citizens petitioned town council for improvements to the cemetery, which they described as "desolate". The petition called for improved water access, tree planting, and the construction of a bridge across the Elbow River so the cemetery could be reached on foot. In 1905 a bridge was constructed across the Elbow River near the entrance to the cemetery. Before this, a ferry was required to access the cemetery and funeral parties had to cross in small groups.

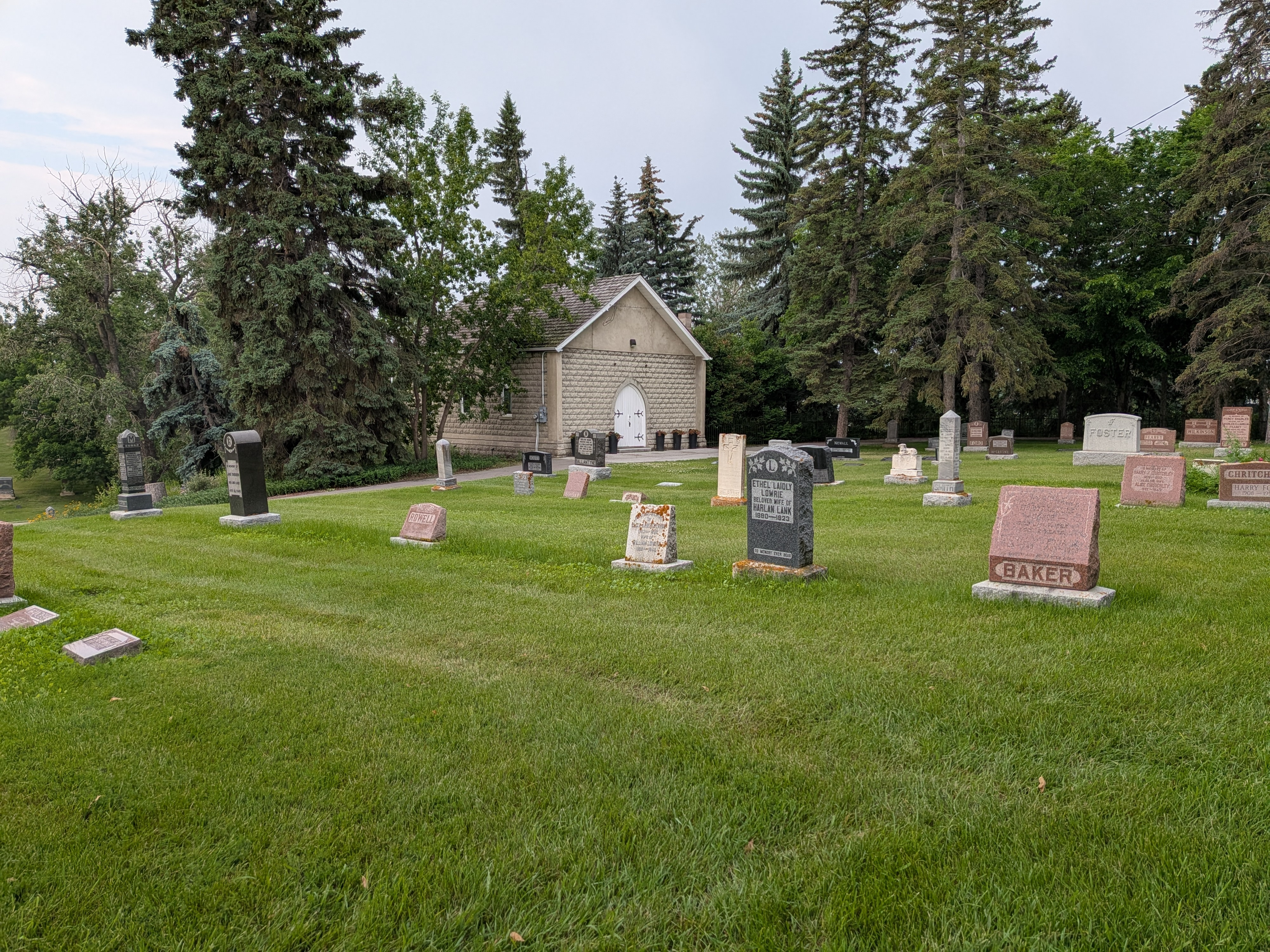
Mortuary at Union Cemetery

In 1908, a mortuary was constructed to serve as both a funeral chapel and a winter storage facility for bodies when frozen ground prevented grave digging. Following services in the chapel, remains were lowered into a crypt beneath the building and stored until spring burial was possible.

In 1911 Richard Iwersen was hired as Superintendent of Parks and Cemeteries and introduced the Victorian garden cemetery design, intending to create a welcoming park-like area for residents to visit. William Reader, Iwersen's successor, continued developing the cemetery in this manner, developing a network of paths lined with trees and flowers.

By 1914 concerns were already being raised about running out of space in the cemetery. In 1916 two new sections were plotted and infrastructure was extended to the south end of the cemetery. Concerns about space in the cemetery continued to mount through 1922 when a new addition was added to the south, Section X.

In 1923 new burials began to move to Burnsland cemetery as Union had few plots remaining.

In 1966 the mortuary chapel was extensively renovated, including being fitted with electricity and gas heating.

== Description ==
Union Cemetery occupies 19 hectares (47 acres) between Spiller Road and McLeod Trail, primarily in the Manchester industrial area. Together with Burnsland Cemetery, St. Mary's Cemetery, Chevra Kadisha Cemetery, and the Chinese Cemetery it forms part of a group of burial grounds recognized by Heritage Calgary as a culturally significant historical landscape. The city offers guided walking tours of the cemetery throughout the summer.

The cemetery contains about 21,000 graves and includes upright monuments, flat markers, in-ground cremation plots, columbaria, and a scattering garden with memorial wall. Its 1908 funeral chapel, originally built as a mortuary and winter storage facility, seats up to 50 people for services.

Although the cemetery was initially described as barren and desolate, it was redesigned beginning in the early 1910s under Richard Iwersen, Calgary's first Superintendent of Parks and Cemeteries. Iwersen introduced a Victorian garden cemetery design intended to create a more park-like setting. He also constructed a superintendent's residence at the north end of the cemetery, where his successor, William Reader, later developed Reader Rock Garden.

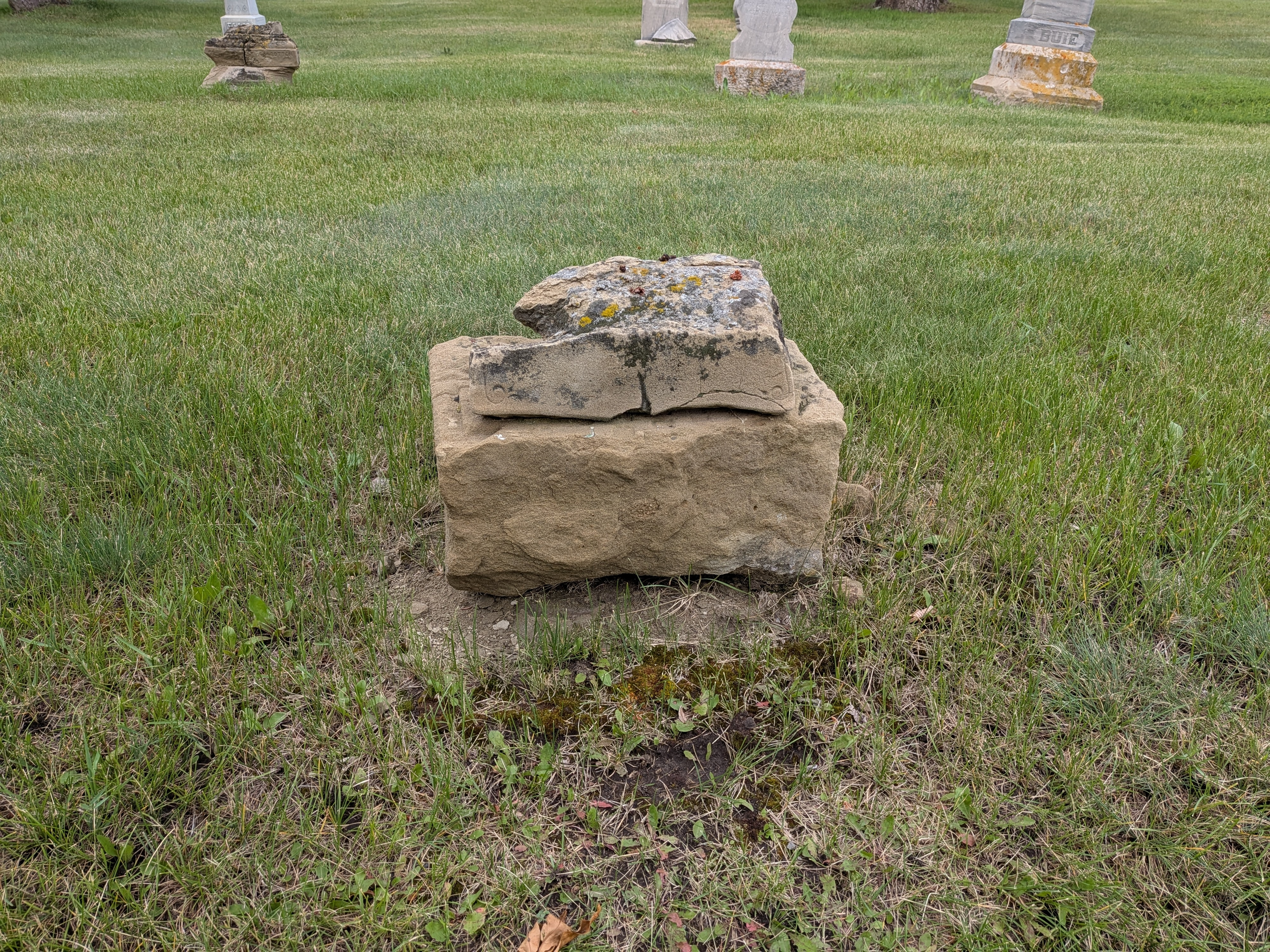
A heavily eroded sandstone headstone

The cemetery contains a field of honour administered by the Commonwealth War Graves Commission where 154 First World War casualties and 3 Second World War casualties are buried. The field of honour also includes several of the city's Boer War veterans and is the location of a Cross of Sacrifice, 25 of which are in Canada.

At the south end of the cemetery is a potter's field where an estimated 1,000 poor and homeless residents were buried, as well as several executed criminals, such as Ernest Cashel.

Many of the early monuments were made of sandstone due to the availability from local quarries, however the sandstone has eroded overtime, leaving some of the earliest headstones illegible.

== Reader Rock Garden ==
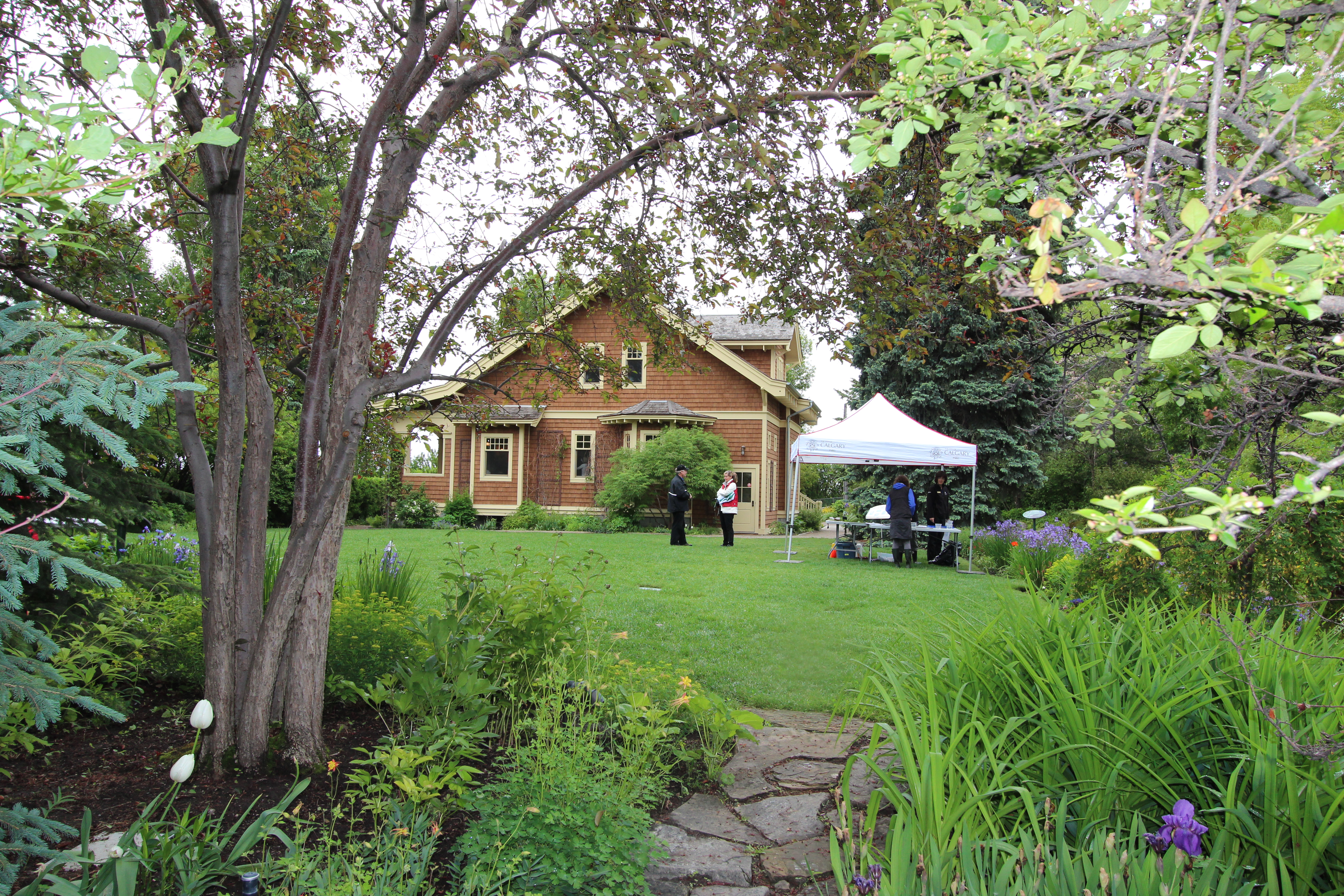
Superintendent's residence at Reader Rock Garden

William Reader, Superintendent of Parks and Cemeteries from 1913 to 1942, developed Reader Rock Garden around his residence at the north end of the cemetery. Reader began work on the garden in 1913, developing a hillside near the cemetery into a rock garden with paths, retaining walls, water features, trees, and test plantings.

Reader tested more than 3,500 plant species and varieties in the garden to determine which could survive in Calgary's climate. Seeds from the garden were used in research and planted in gardens throughout North America and Europe. Reader offered tours of the house and garden during his tenure, and frequently published gardening advice in the Calgary Herald.

Reader died in 1943, and the garden was named in his honour and opened as a public park in 1944. Due to maintenance and utility costs, the original superintendent’s cottage was removed the same year, and other furnishings and structures were removed in later years. From the 1950s through the 1990s, the garden went through periods of neglect and revitalization. By the early 2000s, the garden had fallen into disrepair and was largely overgrown. In 2004, government funding became available to help restore the garden. The superintendent’s house was rebuilt from original architectural drawings, and the garden was restored based on Reader's original plans. The garden and house were reopened to the public in 2006, with the house opening as a cafe.

Reader Rock Garden was designated a Provincial Historic Resource in 2006 and was designated a National Historic Site of Canada in 2018.

== Notable interments ==
- A.E. Cross
- Sir Cecil E. Denny
- Red Dutton
- William Roper Hull
- James Alexander Lougheed
- Peter Lougheed
- J. W. Grant MacEwan
- James F. Macleod
- Archibald McLean
- John Ware

== See also ==
- List of cemeteries in Canada
