= Benjamin Cate Howard =

Canadian merchant and civic leader

- Born: December 8, 1865; Stanstead, Quebec, Canada
- Died: July 23, 1923 (aged 57); Sherbrooke, Quebec, Canada
- Burial place: Elmwood Cemetery (Sherbrooke), 1101 Hyatt St., Sherbrooke, Quebec; J1J 4N5; 45.4139°N 71.9062°W
- Occupation: Lumber merchant
- Spouse: Helen Eloisa Salls (m. 1885)
- Children: Charles Benjamin Howard

Benjamin Cate Howard (8 December 1865 – 23 July 1923) was a Canadian lumber merchant, landowner, philanthropist, and civic leader in Sherbrooke, Quebec. He is best remembered for founding B. C. Howard & Company and for creating Howard Park (Domaine Howard), today a heritage site and public park in Sherbrooke.

== Early life ==
Howard was born in Stanstead, Quebec, the son of James Howard and Clarinda Hunt. He was of Irish and Scottish descent and received his education locally. He grew up on the Howard family farm at Apple Grove (Fitch Bay), where he worked farming and sheep breeding during his youth. He exhibited his sheep at various county fairs and gained some success. He moved to Sherbrooke in 1891 to pursue a career in business.

== Career ==
Howard began in the lumber trade with T. M. Craig before founding B. C. Howard & Company in 1906 with his brother-in-law David J. Salls; his son Charles joined in 1908. Howard pioneered shipping pulpwood by rail to paper mills in Quebec. Over the years, he expanded his business interests into manufacturing, insurance, and real estate, serving in leadership roles with companies including the St. Lawrence Lumber Industrial Company, the International Lumber Company, the Sherbrooke Iron Works, the Sherbrooke Tile and Brick Company, the Stanstead and Sherbrooke Mutual, the Sherbrooke Real Estate Company, and the Eastern Townships Bank. Howard built up a fortune over 25 years in the lumber trade.

In June 1920, Howard and his son were listed as plaintiffs in a legal case before the Superior Court of Quebec. They filed proceedings against the Hartje Paper Company of Pittsburgh, Pennsylvania.

In 1923, shortly before his death, he reorganized the Murray Gregory Company as the English Lake Lumber Company, serving as vice-president.

Howard also owned Province Island on Lake Memphremagog, which straddles the Canada–United States border. He redeveloped the property, turning it into a summer estate that was widely admired.

== Civic involvement and philanthropy ==
Howard and his wife supported numerous social causes in Sherbrooke. They donated the Howard Residence on Moore Street to the YMCA and helped establish the Wales Home in Richmond, a residence for the elderly. He also gave generously to the Young Women’s Christian Association, Stanstead Wesleyan College, and the Methodist Church, where he was an active member. He also served as president of the Sherbrooke General Hospital, chaired the executive committee of Stanstead Wesleyan College, and sat as a city alderman.

== Howardene ==
In 1913 Howard purchased land from the British American Land Company to establish both a family residence and a landscaped park. Designed by landscape architect Frederick Gage Todd, the park opened in 1914 and was called Howardene. His son Charles built a large residence on the estate in 1917, while Howard began constructing a second mansion in 1921. He died before it was completed, and only his widow eventually lived there. The estate later became a public park named Domaine-Howard Park and remains one of Sherbrooke’s most notable heritage landmarks.

== Personal life and death ==
On 1 January 1885, Howard married Helen Eloisa Salls (1863–1941), daughter of Stephen Salls and Frances Derrick. They had two sons, Charles Benjamin Howard (1885–1964), who later became a Member of Parliament, Senator, and Mayor of Sherbrooke and Harvey Prescott Howard (1898–1899) who died in infancy.

Howard’s health had not been strong in his final years, but his sudden death came as a shock. He collapsed in his Sherbrooke office on 23 July 1923 after returning from lunch and subsequently died at the age of 57. Benjamin Cate Howard is buried in Elmwood Cemetery in Sherbrooke.

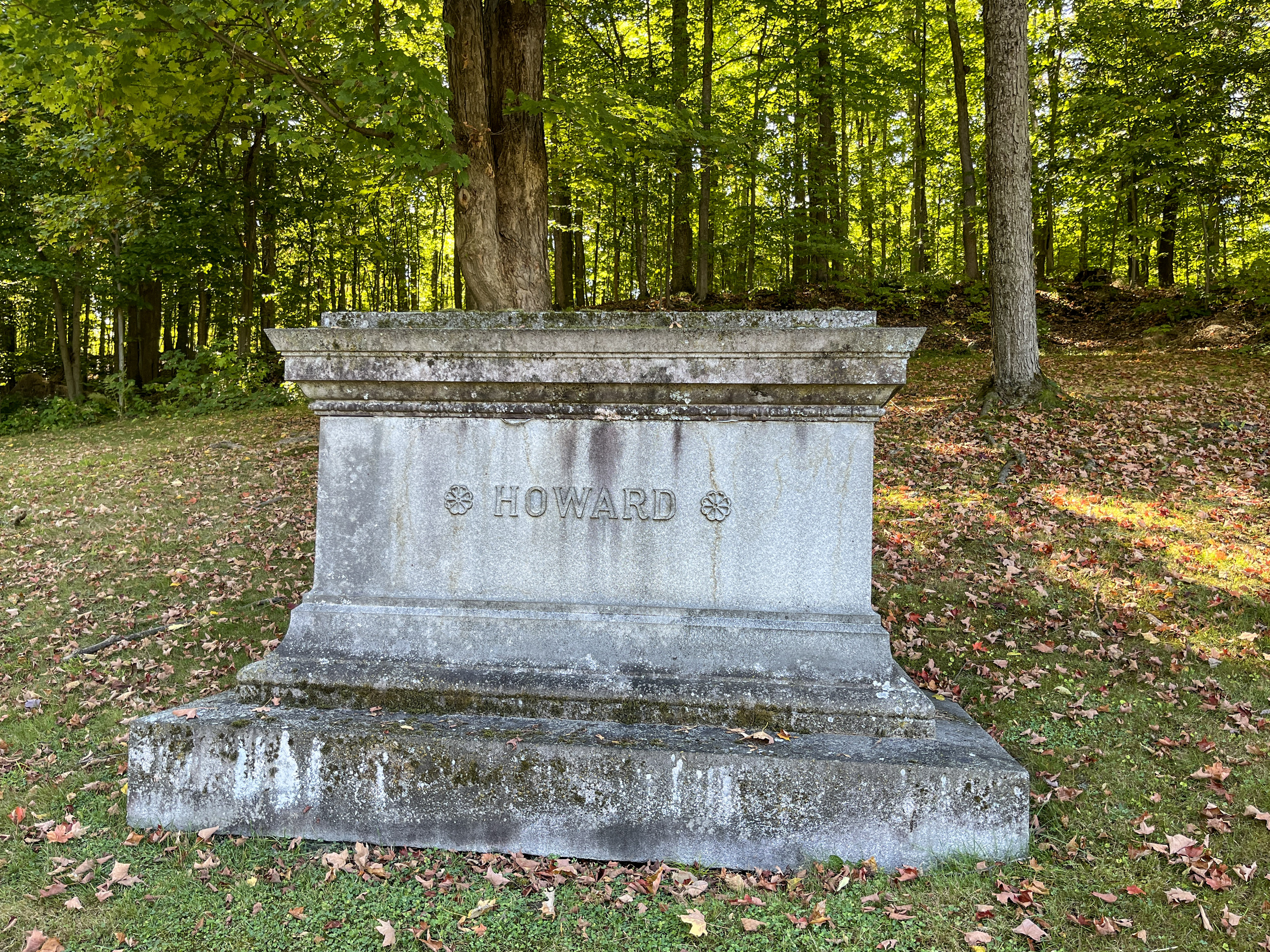
Howard Family tombstone in Elmwood Cemetery, Sherbrooke.

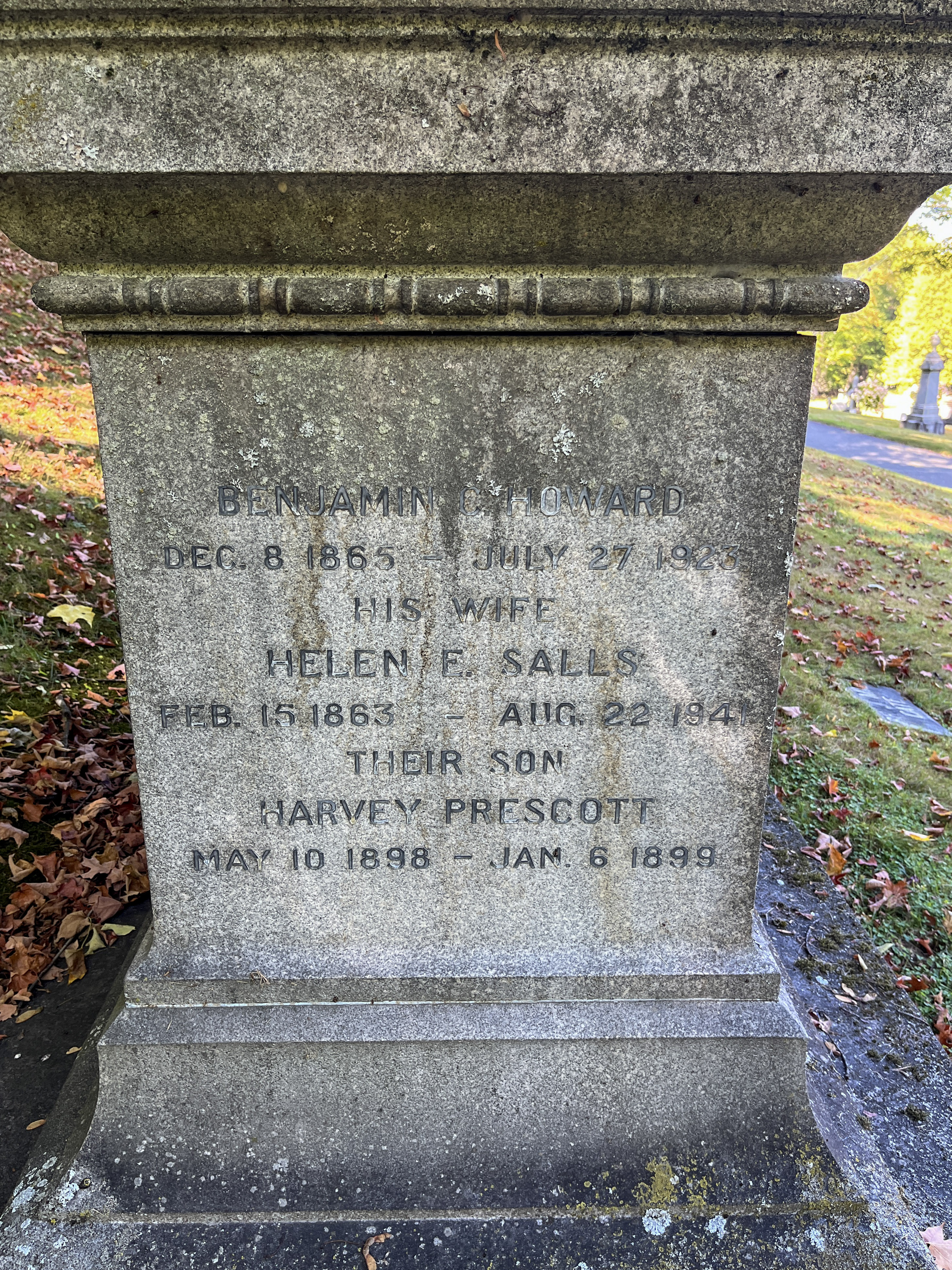
Left side of family tombstone.

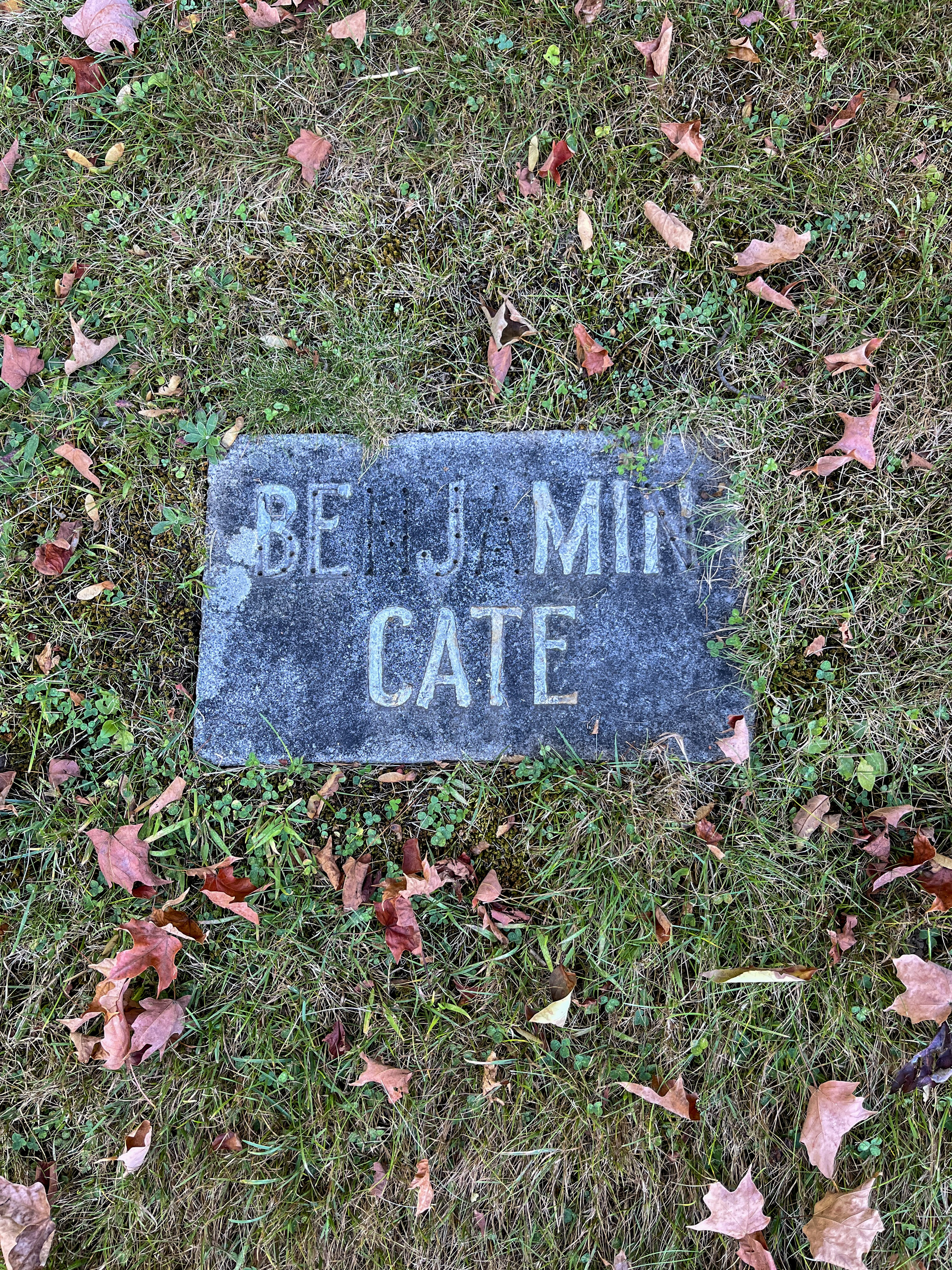
Benjamin Cate Howard's headstone.

== See also ==
- Eastern Townships
- English-speaking Quebecers
- Irish Quebecers
- Scots-Quebecers
