= Robyn Denny =

British artist (1930–2014)

- Born: 3 October 1930; Abinger, Surrey, England, UK
- Died: 20 May 2014 (aged 83); Cahors, France
- Education: Royal College of Art
- Known for: Painting
- Movement: Abstract Art
- Spouse(s): Anna Teasdale (1953–1975; divorced); Marjorie Abela (1995–2014); 3 children
- Website: robyndenny.co.uk

Edward Maurice FitzGerald "Robyn" Denny (3 October 1930 – 20 May 2014) was one of a group of young artists who transformed British art in the late 1950s, leading it into the international mainstream. Reacting against the mainstream St Ives School of landscape-based painting and inspired by Abstract Expressionism, American films, popular culture and urban modernity, they saw abstract painting as their only conceivable route.

== Early life ==
He was born in Abinger, Surrey, the third son of The Rev. Sir Henry Denny, 7th Baronet, a clergyman, and his wife Joan, whose family name was also Denny. He was educated at Clayesmore School, Dorset. The family's coat of arms was: Gules a saltire argent between twelve cross crosslets or.

== Career ==
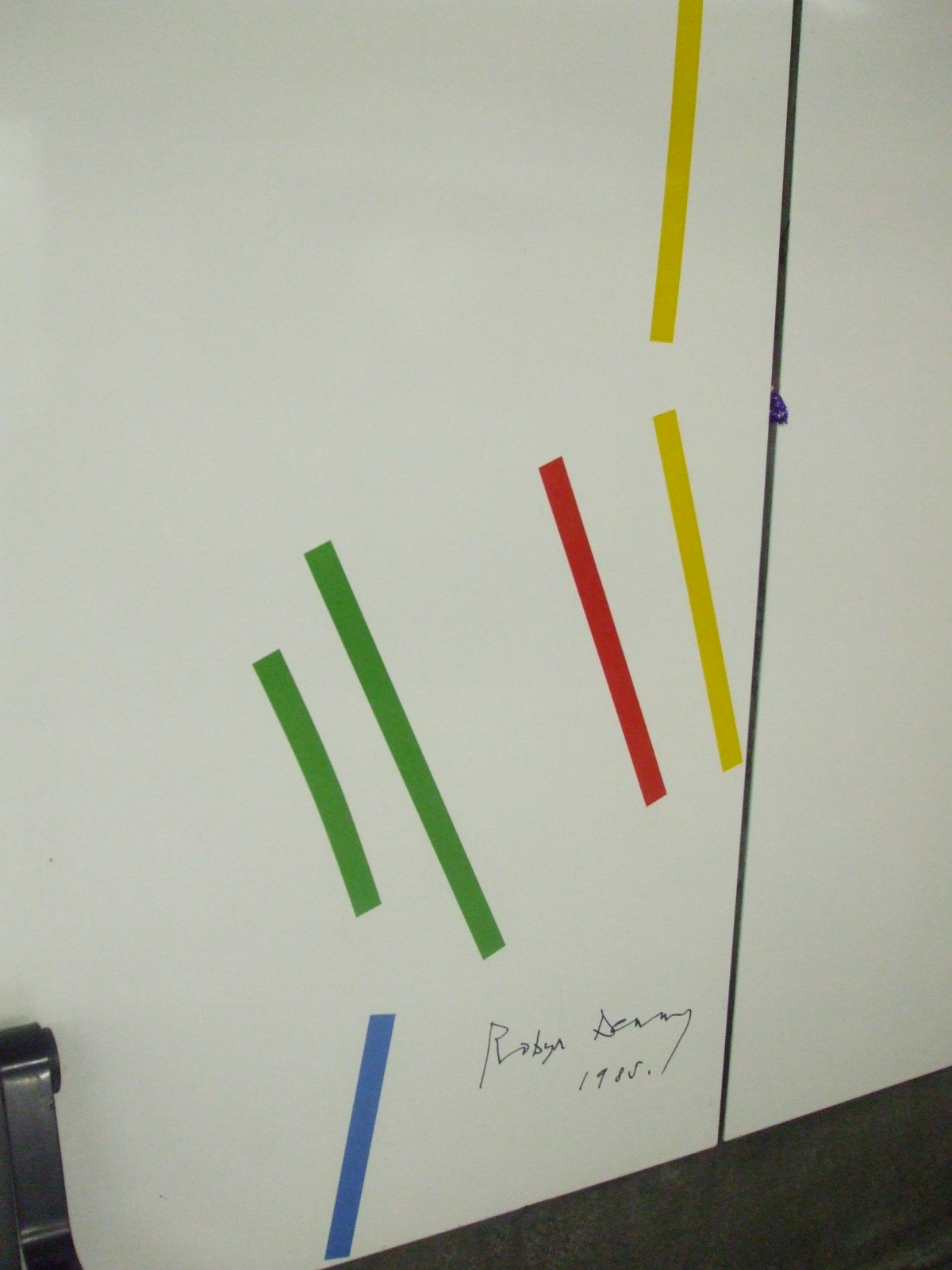
Robyn Denny's art and autograph at Embankment tube station, London

After national service in the Royal Navy he studied at St Martin's School of Art (1951–54) and the Royal College of Art (1954–57). After graduating from the Royal College in 1957 he was awarded a scholarship to study in Italy, then taught part-time at Hammersmith School of Art, the Slade School of Art and the Bath Academy of Art, Corsham.

Among the paintings Denny created at the Royal College are rudimentary images of heads, indebted to French Tachisme, with dripped and dribbled paint. These were interspersed with abstract collages and large gestural paintings which display the broad gestures and bold marks of American Abstract Expressionism, exhibited in London in 1956 and 1959. In 1969, he organised an exhibition for the Arts Council on the American artist Charles Biederman, who for over 20 years worked exclusively on vividly coloured abstract reliefs. This experience coincided with a new intensity of colour in Denny's work, shifting from rich, dark harmonies to high, bright contrasts, from a sense of twilight to daylight. In 1981 Denny moved to Los Angeles, but he returned to London in 1986.

In California Denny's painting again changed radically. In the late 1970s, the acrylic ‘Moonshine’ drawings had incorporated scratch marks, leading eventually to a series of large monochrome paintings where a concentrated cluster of scratching rests, with shockingly disruptive impact, on a thin horizontal: a datum line, never a ‘horizon’. The acrylic surfaces are delicate and subtly modulated, constructed from up to 30 layers of pigment applied until it is intensely rich, absorbing the eye and the attention.

Denny's most frequently seen (and most often overlooked) work is the public art, in the form of coloured lines, installed in the Embankment tube station in London in 1985.

== Exhibitions ==
- Place (Institute of Contemporary Arts, London, 1959
- Situation (RBA Galleries, London, 1960)
- London: the New Scene (Walker Art Gallery, Liverpool, Minneapolis and North American tour, 1965)
- Venice Biennale, 1966
- Tate Gallery retrospective (1973
- The Sixties Art Scene in London (Barbican Art Gallery, London, 1993)

== Personal life ==
Robyn Denny married the British watercolour artist Anna Teasdale, whom he met at St Martin's School of Art, in 1953. The couple had two children, Dominic and Lucy. The marriage was dissolved in 1975. His youngest son, Ned, was born during his long-term relationship with the art restoration expert Katharine Reid. He married Marjorie Abela in 1995, and divided his time between his homes in London and France.

== Death ==
Robyn Denny died on 20 May 2014 in France at the age of 83.
