= Charles Benjamin Howard =

Canadian politician

The Hon. Charles Benjamin Howard

Member of Parliament for Sherbrooke
- In office October 1925 – January 1940
- Preceded by: riding created
- Succeeded by: Maurice Gingues

Senator for Wellington, Quebec
- In office 8 February 1940 – 25 March 1964
- Appointed by: William Lyon Mackenzie King
- Preceded by: Albert Joseph Brown
- Succeeded by: Paul Desruisseaux

Personal details
- Born: 27 September 1885 Smith's Mills, Quebec
- Died: 25 March 1964 (aged 78) Sherbrooke, Quebec
- Resting place: Elmwood Cemetery (Sherbrooke)
- Party: Liberal
- Children: 4
- Occupation: Lumber merchant, politician

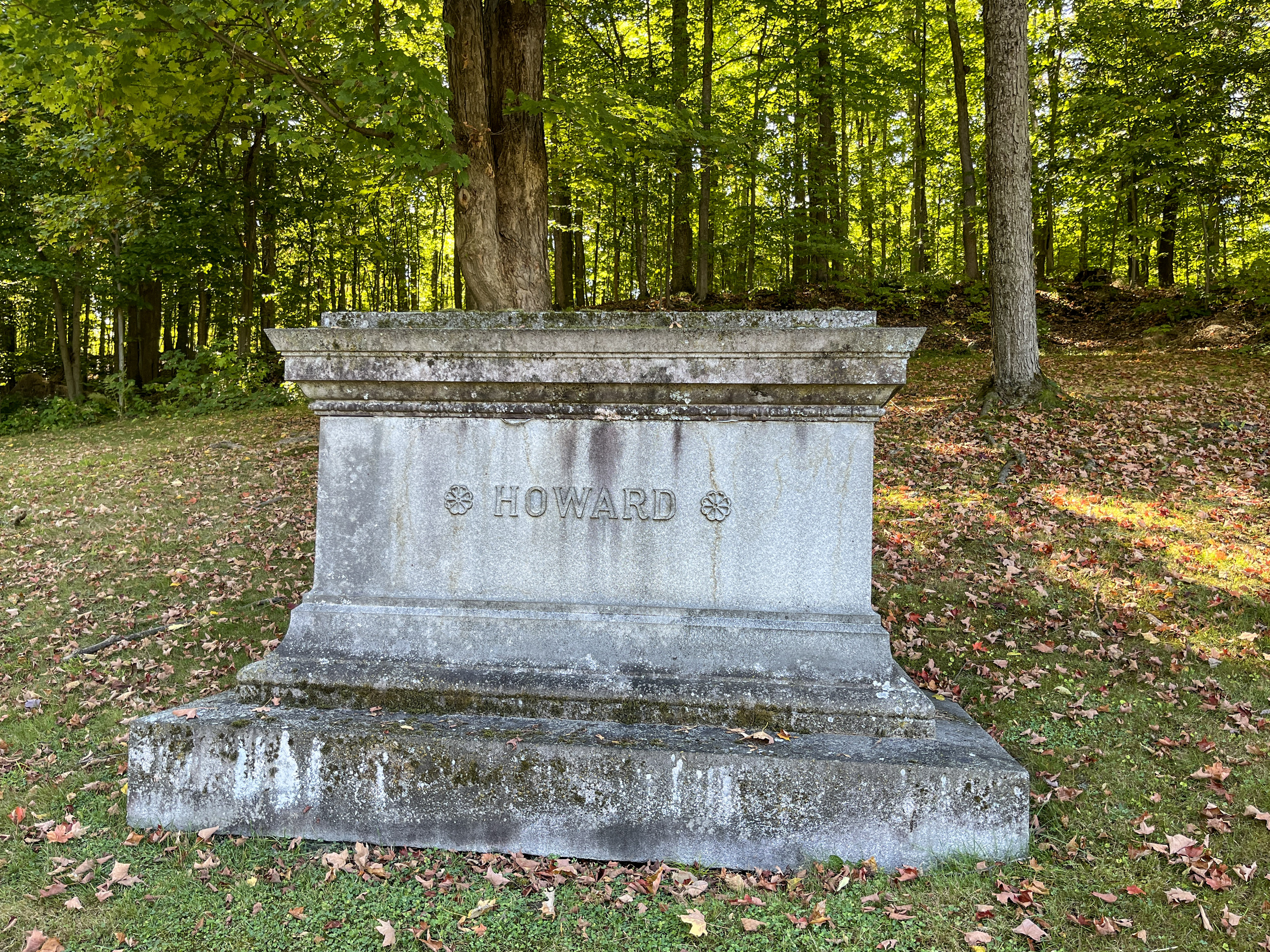
Howard Family tombstone in Elmwood Cemetery (Sherbrooke).

Charles Benjamin Howard (27 September 1885 – 25 March 1964) was a Liberal party member of the House of Commons of Canada. He was known for his eloquence in English and French.

Howard was born in Smith's Mills, Quebec in Stanstead County to Benjamin Cate Howard and Helen Eloisa Salls. Howard attended high school in Sherbrooke then Stanstead Wesleyan College. He became a businessman (lumber merchant) in 1908 when he joined his father's company B.C. Howard Company. In 1923, he assumed the presidency of his family's lumber operation, B.C. Howard Company, following his father's death.

He was first elected to Parliament in the Sherbrooke riding in the 1925 general election then re-elected in 1926, 1930 and 1935. After completing his term in the 18th Canadian Parliament, Howard left the House of Commons and was appointed to the Senate for the Wellington, Quebec division.

During the 1939 royal tour of Canada, King George VI and Queen Elizabeth visited Sherbrooke on 12 June. As they prepared to sign the city’s guest book, both pens provided for the occasion failed. Howard, who was standing nearby, quickly offered his own pen, which Their Majesties used to complete the signing.

In 1950 and 1951, Howard was mayor of Sherbrooke.

On 25 March 1964, Howard died at his Sherbrooke residence shortly after completing a visit to Mexico. He remained a Senator at that time. His family estate, Domaine-Howard Park (aka Howardene), was sold to the City of Sherbrooke in 1962 and transformed into a public park that remains a heritage landmark. His residence, Maison Benjamin-C.-Howard (constructed 1921–23 and later restored), is registered in Quebec’s Répertoire du patrimoine culturel alongside other associated properties.

== Personal life ==
Howard was married three times. First, to Alberta May Campbell in 1908 (d. 1943), with whom he had four children. Subsequently, to Klaire D. Shoup (m. 1944; d. 1953), and finally to Simone Lemieux Walters in 1959.

== See also ==
- Eastern Townships
- English-speaking Quebecers
