= Denny baronets of Gillingham (1642) =

Baronetcy in the Baronetage of England

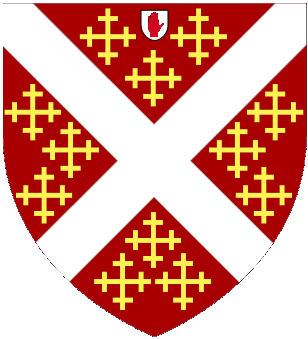
Escutcheon of the Denny baronets of Gillingham

Pelecanicidium, frontispiece to Book I

The Denny baronetcy, of Gillingham in the County of Norfolk, was created in the Baronetage of England on 3 June 1642 for William Denny. He was the son of Sir William Denny (c.1578–1642) and his first wife Frances Taverner.

The title became extinct on the 1st Baronet's death in 1676.

== Denny baronets, of Gillingham (1642) ==
- Sir William Denny, 1st Baronet (1603/4–1676)

Denny was the author of Pelecanicidium, or, The Christian adviser against self-murder (1653), a work in prose and verse. He died in poverty.
