= Denny baronets of Dumbarton (1913) =

Baronetcy

Denny baronets
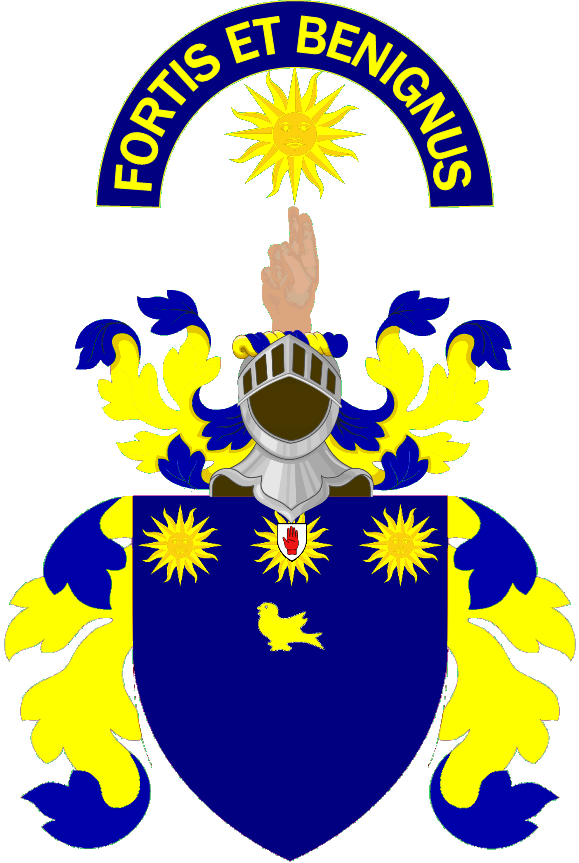
- Coat of arms of the Denny baronets of Dumbarton
- Creation date: 1913
- Status: extant
- Motto: Fortis Et Benignus, brave and merciful
- Arms: Azure three suns in their splendour in chief Or and in the honour point a martlet of the last.
- Crest: A dexter hand erect pointing with two fingers at a sun in his splendour all Proper.

The Denny baronetcy, of Dumbarton in the County of Dunbarton, was created in the Baronetage of the United Kingdom on 16 June 1913 for the naval architect and shipbuilder Archibald Denny. He was a Director of William Denny & Brothers Ltd, shipbuilders and engineers, of Dumbarton.

The 2nd Baronet was President of William Denny & Brothers Ltd. The 3rd Baronet served in the Fleet Air Arm from 1944 to 1946.

== Denny baronets, of Dumbarton (1913) ==
- Sir Archibald Denny, 1st Baronet FRSE (1860–1936), shipbuilder
- Sir Maurice Edward Denny, 2nd Baronet (1886–1955)
- Sir Alistair Maurice Archibald Denny, 3rd Baronet (1922–1995)
- Sir Charles Alistair Maurice Denny, 4th Baronet (born 1950)

The heir apparent is the present holder's only son Patrick Charles Alistair Denny (born 1985).

== Notes ==
Baronetage of the United Kingdom
Preceded by Barrie baronets	Denny baronets of Dumbarton; 16 June 1913	Succeeded by Gwynne-Evans baronets
