= Sir Cecil Denny, 6th Baronet =

Sir Cecil Edward Denny, 6th Baronet (14 December 1850 – 24 August 1928), was an Anglo-Irish baronet born in Hampshire, England. He moved to Edmonton, Alberta, Canada, and worked as a police officer, Indian agent, and author.

The younger son of the Rev. Day Denny, vicar of Shedfield, by his second wife Frances Waller, he was educated at Cheltenham College and in France and Germany. Denny was a founding member of the North-West Mounted Police of which he became inspector. He was later a police magistrate and a commissioner-in-charge to a number of native tribes. In his later career he was keeper of records and archivist for the Government of Alberta.

In 1921 he succeeded his step brother, Sir Robert Denny, to become 6th Baronet of Castle Moyle.

He died, unmarried, in 1928 and was buried in Union Cemetery, Calgary.

== Arms ==
Coat of arms of Sir Cecil Denny, 6th Baronet
Notes Confirmed by William Hawkins, Ulster King of Arms, 10 January 1782. Crest A cubit arm vested Azure turned up Argent holding in the hand Proper five ears of wheat Or. Escutcheon Gules a saltire Argent between twelve cross crosslets Or. Motto Et mea Messis Erit

Baronetage of Ireland
Preceded by Robert Denny	Baronet (of Castle Moyle); 1921–1928	Succeeded by Henry Denny
