= Gilbert Hyatt =

- Born: 1761
- Died: September 17, 1823 (aged 61–62)
- Occupations: Justice of the peace, founder of Sherbrooke.

Gilbert Hyatt (c. 1761 – 17 September 1823) was a Loyalist, settler, justice of the peace, and one of the founders of Sherbrooke, Lower Canada.

== Early life and military service ==
Hyatt was born around 1761, in Arlington, Vermont, to Abraham Hyatt and Merriam Hills. The Hyatt family had settled in New York in the mid-17th century after emigrating from England. During the American Revolutionary War, his father Abraham and brothers, including Gilbert, sided with the Loyalists. In 1777, Abraham, Gilbert, and his brother Cornelius enlisted with Major-General John Burgoyne’s army. Gilbert served as a corporal in the King’s Loyal Americans.

After Burgoyne’s surrender at Saratoga, the Hyatts may have moved temporarily to Quebec before returning to the United States. In 1780, Abraham claimed to have brought his entire family to British territory. Evidence shows Gilbert was living near Missisquoi Bay by 1778.

== Settlement and petitions ==
After the war, the Hyatts and other Loyalists petitioned for land along the border near Lake Champlain, but Governor Frederick Haldimand refused, ordering them to move further inland. Hyatt remained in the region despite threats that homes would be destroyed and rations cut off.

Following the Constitutional Act of 1791, new procedures for land grants were introduced. On March 29, 1792, Hyatt petitioned for Ascot Township, along with 204 associates. The township lay at the junction of the Saint-François and Magog rivers, an area with waterpower and resources for settlement. A survey was authorized in June 1792. Hyatt sold his property at Missisquoi Bay and, with Josiah Sawyer, built a 40-mile road to Ascot, where he established a settlement by 1794.

Hyatt was considered the first “township leader” (chef de canton) to settle in the Eastern Townships under the new land grant system. This system grouped settlers under a leader who petitioned for land on behalf of associates and their families.

Hyatt and his associates formally settled in Ascot Township in 1793 and received the official concession on March 5, 1803. Around this time, he built a gristmill near the confluence of the Saint-François and Magog rivers, while other settlers, such as the Ball family, built a sawmill. These installations became the nucleus of the settlement.

== Land disputes ==
Hyatt faced years of legal and administrative obstacles in securing title to his land. He reduced his list of associates to 40 and swore the oath of allegiance in 1795. Despite spending heavily on mills, surveys, and settlers, he waited until 1803 to receive official letters patent. His grants were smaller than expected, while others received larger ones. Hyatt repeatedly petitioned for better terms without success.

The village that grew around his mills was first called Lower Forks, later Hyatt’s Mill, and in 1818 was renamed Sherbrooke after Governor Sir John Coape Sherbrooke. By that time, the village had around 200 inhabitants, mostly of American, English, Irish, and Scottish origin.

== Public life and later years ==
Hyatt sold farmland in 1805 and continued developing his mills. He became a justice of the peace in 1806 and was appointed in 1808 as commissioner to administer the oath of allegiance to new settlers in Ascot Township.

Hyatt’s finances suffered, and he lost land through court-ordered sales in 1808, 1811, and 1812, mainly to creditor Ezekiel Hart of Trois-Rivières. The sales included lots in the village with a distillery and potash works. His wife was able to repurchase some properties, and Hyatt remained a landowner in Ascot, though less prominent.

By 1819, Hyatt and his family were among 54 residents of Sherbrooke. New English immigrants gained influence in the town, and Hyatt lost his post as justice of the peace in 1815. His last dealings involved the settlement of his father’s estate in 1822 and sales of land to his sons Galen and Charles.

== Death ==
Hyatt died of a heart attack on 17 September 1823, and was buried in Sherbrooke two days later, with his wife present. He was a member of the Church of England.

== Legacy ==
Hyatt is recognized as one of the founders of Sherbrooke. The village that grew around his mills formed the nucleus of the town, which became the chief town of the new Saint-François judicial district in 1823. That decade also saw the construction of a courthouse, a jail, several churches, and the first dam on the Magog River, as well as the arrival of French Canadian settlers who would later become the majority population.

== See also ==
- English-speaking Quebecers
- History of Quebec
- Lower Canada
