= List of cemeteries in Canada =

This is a list of cemeteries in Canada, by province or territory.

== Alberta ==
- Alto Reste Cemetery, Red Deer
- Beechmount Cemetery, Edmonton
- Blackfoot Crossing Cemetery, Cluny
- Burnsland Cemetery, Calgary
- Edmonton Municipal Cemetery, Edmonton
- Elnora Cemetery, Elnora
- Holy Cross Cemetery, Edmonton
- Lougheed Cemetery, Lougheed
- Okotoks Cemetery, Okotoks
- Queens Park Cemetery and Mausoleum, Calgary
- Rosehill Cemetery, Edmonton
- St. Mary's Catholic Cemetery, Cochrane
- St. Mary's Ukrainian Catholic Cemetery, Chipman
- Temple Hill, Raymond
- Union Cemetery, Calgary
- Viking Cemetery, Viking

== British Columbia ==
- Burrard Cemetery, North Vancouver
- Forest Lawn Memorial Park (Burnaby)
- Fraser Cemetery, New Westminster
- Kelowna Municipal Cemetery, Kelowna
- Mountain View Cemetery, Vancouver
- Ocean View Burial Park, Burnaby
- Port Coquitlam Municipal Cemetery, Port Coquitlam
- Ross Bay Cemetery, Victoria
- Jewish Cemetery of Victoria
- Columbia Riverview Cemetery, Trail
- Chilliwack Cemeteries, Chilliwack
- Langley Lawn Cemetery, Langley
- Hatley Memorial Gardens], Colwood
- Westminster Abbey Cemetery], Mission
- Surrey Centre Cemetery], Cloverdale
- Ladysmith Cemetery], Ladysmith
- Coldstream Municipal Cemetery], Coldstream
- Nanaimo Chinese Cemetery], Nanaimo

== Manitoba ==
- All Saints Cemetery, Winnipeg
- Brookside Cemetery, Winnipeg
- Elmwood Cemetery, Winnipeg
- Glen Eden Memorial Gardens, West St. Paul, Manitoba
- Greenwood Cemetery, Carman
- Hillside Cemetery, Portage la Prairie
- Saint Boniface Cathedral Cemetery, Winnipeg
- St. Vital Cemetery, Winnipeg
- Green Acres Funeral Home and Cemetery, Navin

== New Brunswick ==
- Elmwood Cemetery, Moncton
- Fernhill Cemetery, Saint John
- Forest Hill Cemetery, Fredericton
- Greenwood Cemetery, Hartland
- St. Albans Cemetery, Bathurst

== Newfoundland and Labrador ==
- Anglican Burial Ground, Cathedral of St. John the Baptist, St. John's
- Bay Bulls Holy Trinity Old Anglican Cemetery, Bay Bulls
- Cape Broyle Immaculate Conception Cemetery, Cape Broyle
- Belvedere Roman Catholic Cemetery, St. John's
- Forest Road Anglican Cemetery, St. John's
- Gate of Heaven Roman Catholic Cemetery, St John's (Galway)
- General Protestant Cemetery, St. John's
- Groves Road Cemetery, St. John's
- Holy Apostles Roman Catholic Cemetery, Renews-Cappahayden
- Holy Trinity New Anglican Cemetery, Bay Bulls
- Holy Trinity Cemetery, Ferryland
- Kenmount Road Anglican Cemetery, St. John's
- Kilbride Roman Catholic Cemetery, St. John's
- Mobile Roman Catholic Cemetery, Mobile
- Mount Carmel Roman Catholic Cemetery, St. John's
- Mount Loretta Roman Catholic Cemetery, Bay Bulls
- Mount Pleasant Cemetery, St. John's
- Our Lady Fatima Roman Catholic Cemetery, Aquaforte
- Our Lady of the Cape New Roman Catholic Cemetery, Cape Broyle
- Saint Charles Borromeo Cemetery, Fermeuse
- Saint Patrick's Presentation Convent Cemetery, St. John's
- Saint Philips Anglican Cemetery, Aquaforte
- Salvation Army Cemetery, St. John's
- St. John's Jewish Cemetery, St. John's
- Tors Cove Roman Catholic, Tors Cove
- Trepassey Roman Catholic Cemetery, Trepassey

== Northwest Territories ==
- Back Bay Cemetery, Yellowknife

== Nunavut ==
- Apex Cemetery, Iqaluit

== Nova Scotia ==
- Camp Hill Cemetery, Halifax
- Fairview Cemetery, Halifax
- Garrison Cemetery, Annapolis Royal, Nova Scotia
- Gates of Heaven Cemetery, Lower Sackville
- Holy Cross Cemetery, Halifax
- Mount Olivet Cemetery, Halifax
- Nictaux Community Centre Cemetery, Nictaux
- Old Burying Ground, Halifax

== Ontario ==
- African Cemetery, Essex
- Avondale Cemetery, Stratford
- Beechwood Cemetery, Ottawa
- Belleville Cemetery, Belleville
- Burlington Memorial Gardens, Burlington
- Cataraqui Cemetery, Kingston
- Colborne Union Cemetery, Colborne
- Drummond Hill Cemetery, Niagara Falls
- Elmira Mennonite Cemetery, Elmira
- Elmira Union Cemetery, Elmira
- Erin Cemetery, Erin
- Fairview Cemetery, Listowel
- Fairview Cemetery, Niagara Falls
- Forest Lawn Memorial Gardens, London
- Greenwood Cemetery, Owen Sound
- Greenwood Cemetery, Sault Ste. Marie
- Hamilton Cemetery, Hamilton
- Heavenly Rest Catholic Cemetery, Windsor
- Highland Park Cemetery, Peterborough
- Holy Cross Catholic Cemetery, Brantford
- Holy Sepulchre Catholic Cemetery, Burlington
- Keewaywin Cemetery, Kenora
- Lakeview Cemetery, Sarnia
- Lakeview Cemetery, Thorold
- Little Lake Cemetery, Peterborough
- Marymount Catholic Cemetery, Guelph
- Mohawk Chapel Cemetery, Brantford
- Mount Hope Cemetery, Kitchener
- Notre Dame Cemetery, Ottawa
- Pinecrest Cemetery, Ottawa
- Pleasantview Memorial Gardens, Thorold
- Queenston Heights Monument, Niagara-on-the-Lake
- Riverside Cemetery, Lindsay
- Sacred Heart Cemetery, North Bay
- St. Andrew's West Cemetery, Cornwall
- St. Columba's Cemetery, Pembroke
- St. Mark's Cemetery, Port Hope
- St. Marys Cemetery, St. Marys
- St. Mary's Catholic Cemetery, Barrie
- St. Patrick's Catholic Cemetery, Fallowfield
- St. Patrick's Cemetery, Lucan
- St. Thomas Cemetery, St. Thomas
- St. Volodymyr Ukrainian Cemetery, Oakville
- Thornbury-Clarksburg Union Cemetery, Thornbury
- Timmins Memorial Cemetery, Timmins
- Trafalgar Lawn Cemetery, Oakville
- Victoria Lawn Cemetery, St. Catharines
- West Korah Cemetery, Sault Ste. Marie
- Willowbank Cemetery, Gananoque
- Woodland Cemetery, Kitchener
- Woodland Cemetery, London
- Woodlawn Memorial Park, Guelph

== Prince Edward Island ==
- St. Peter's Anglican Cemetery, Charlottetown

== Quebec ==
- Mount Royal Cemetery, Montreal
- National Field of Honour, Pointe-Claire
- Cimetière Notre-Dame-de-Belmont, (formerly Sainte-Foy) Quebec City
- Notre Dame des Neiges Cemetery, Montreal. Maurice Richard, George-Étienne Cartier
- Mount Hermon Cemetery, (formerly Sillery)
- St. Thomas Aquinas Cemetery, Compton
- Saint-François d'Assise Cemetery, Saint-Leonard

== Saskatchewan ==
- Estevan City Cemetery, Estevan
- Hillcrest Cemetery, Weyburn
- Moose Jaw City Cemetery, Moose Jaw
- Nutana Pioneer Cemetery, Saskatoon
- Prince Albert Memorial Gardens, Prince Albert
- Rainton Cemetery, Weyburn
- Regina Memorial Gardens, Regina
- Riverside Memorial Park Cemetery, Regina
- Rosedale Cemetery, Moose Jaw
- South Hill Cemetery, Prince Albert
- Stoughton Cemetery, Stoughton
- Woodlawn Cemetery, Saskatoon
- Yorkton City Cemetery, Yorkton
- Alingly Cemetery, Spruce Home

== Yukon ==
- Grey Mountain Cemetery, Whitehorse
