= Denny baronets =

Set index for Denny baronets

There have been three baronetcies created for persons with the surname Denny, one in the Baronetage of England, one in the Baronetage of Ireland and one in the Baronetage of the United Kingdom. As of 2026 two of the creations are extant.

- Denny baronets of Gillingham (1642)
- Denny baronets of Castle Moyle (1782)
- Denny baronets of Dumbarton (1913)
