= George Green Foster =

Canadian lawyer and politician (1860–1931)

The Hon. George Green Foster
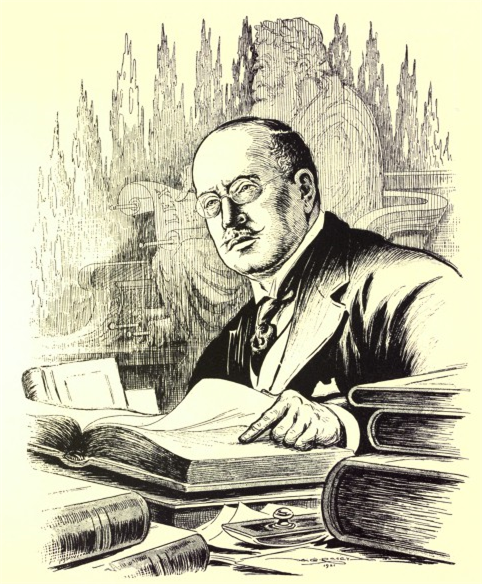
- George Green Foster in Canadian men of affairs in cartoon, 1922

Senator for Alma, Quebec
- In office July 27, 1917 – May 1, 1931
- Appointed by: Robert Borden
- Preceded by: Robert Mackay
- Succeeded by: Charles Ballantyne

Personal details
- Born: January 21, 1860 Knowlton, Canada East
- Died: May 1, 1931 (aged 71)
- Party: Conservative
- Children: George Buchanan Foster

George Green Foster (January 21, 1860 – May 1, 1931) was a Canadian lawyer and politician.

Born in Knowlton, Canada East, the son of Samuel E. Foster and Ellen Green, Foster was educated at Knowlton Academy and McGill University (B.C.L., 1881). He was called to the Quebec bar in 1881 and was created a Queen's Counsel in 1896. His son George Buchanan Foster was a World War I flying ace.

Foster was the Conservative candidate in Brome in the 1896 federal election but was defeated by Liberal Sydney A. Fisher.

He was summoned to the Senate of Canada in 1917 on the advice of Conservative Prime Minister Sir Robert Borden and served until his death in 1931.
