= Andrew McMaster =

Andrew McMaster may refer to:

- Drew McMaster (Andrew Emlyn McMaster, born 1957), Scottish athlete
- Andrew McMaster, an alias used by British anti-Islam activist Tommy Robinson, co-founder of the English Defence League
- Andrew Ross McMaster (1876–1931), Canadian politician
- Andrew McMaster (songwriter) (born 1941), member of The Motors
- Andy McMaster (footballer) (1914–1998), Australian rules footballer
