= George Harold Baker =

Canadian politician (1877–1916)

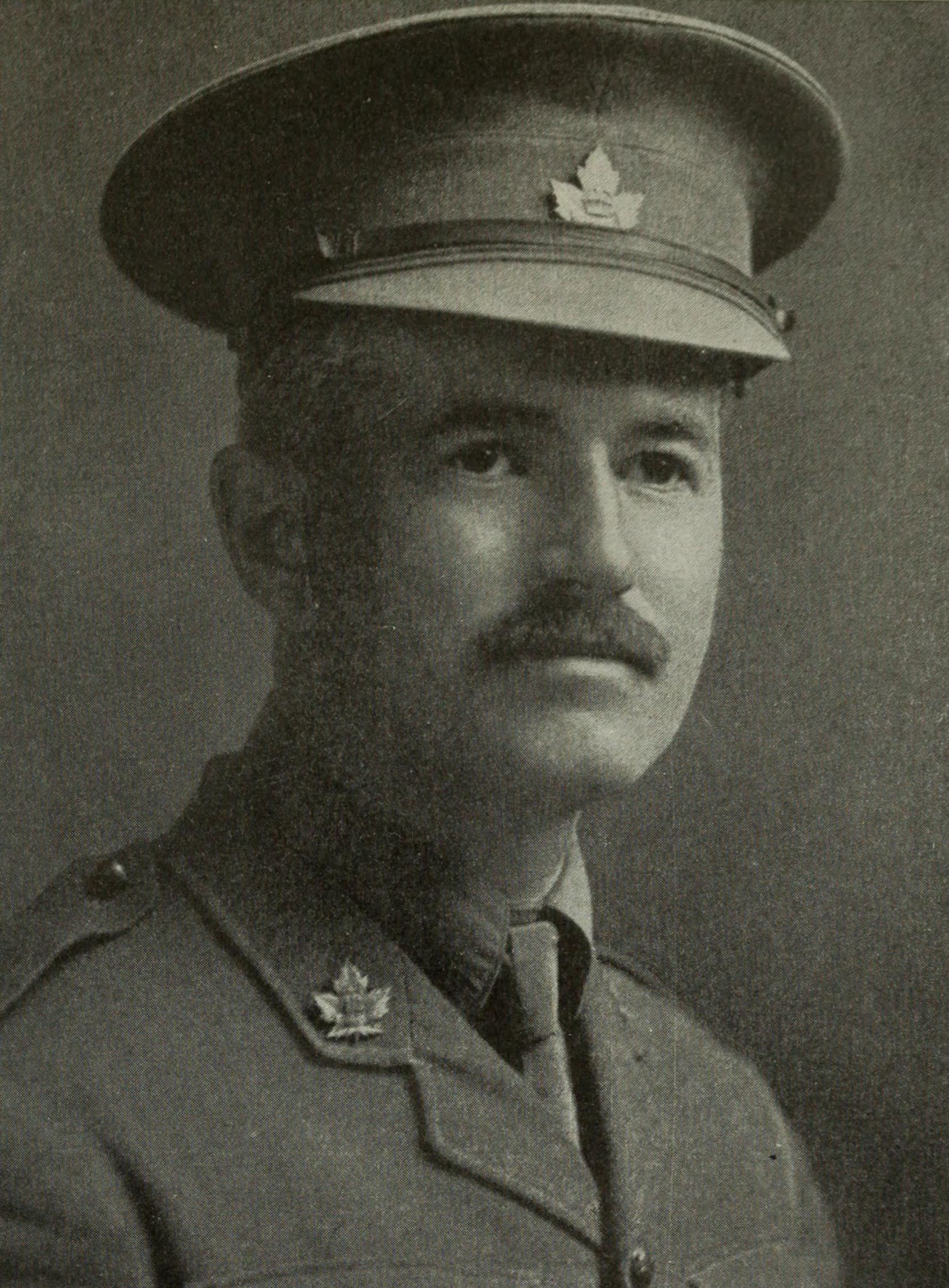
- Baker in uniform at Valcartier (July 1915)

Member of Parliament for Brome
- In office September 21, 1911 – June 2, 1916
- Preceded by: Sydney A. Fisher
- Succeeded by: Andrew Ross McMaster

Personal details
- Born: November 4, 1877 Sweetsburg, Quebec, Canada
- Died: June 2, 1916 (aged 38) Mount Sorrel, Ypres Salient, Belgium
- Cause of death: Killed in action
- Party: Conservative
- Relations: George Barnard Baker, father
- Education: McGill University
- Profession: Lawyer, soldier

Military service
- Allegiance: Canada
- Branch/service: Canadian Army
- Years of service: 1903–1916
- Rank: Lieutenant Colonel
- Unit: 6th Duke of Connaught's Royal Canadian Hussars; 13th Scottish Light Dragoons; 5th Battalion, Canadian Mounted Rifles, CEF
- Battles/wars: World War I: Ypres Salient actions; Battle of Mount Sorrel †

George Harold Baker (November 4, 1877 – June 2, 1916) was a lawyer, political figure, and soldier from Quebec, Canada. He represented Brome in the House of Commons of Canada from 1911 to 1916 as a Conservative Member of Parliament.

He is the only sitting Canadian MP to be killed in action on military service. Fellow MP Samuel Simpson Sharpe also served at the front, was wounded and died by suicide in 1918 while on convalescent leave in Canada.

== Early life ==
He was born in Sweetsburg, Quebec, the son of George Barnard Baker, a member of parliament and Senator. He studied at Bishop's College School from 1889 to 1893.

Prior to the First World War, Baker served as a member of the 6th Duke of Connaught’s Royal Canadian Hussars and the 13th Scottish Light Dragoons.

== Political career ==
Baker was elected as the Member of Parliament for Brome in the 1911 federal election, representing the Conservative Party.

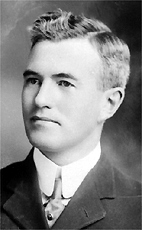

1911 Canadian federal election
Party	Candidate	Votes
Conservative	George Harold Baker	1,520
Liberal	Sydney Arthur Fisher	1,496

== First World War ==
Baker fought in World War I as a Lieutenant-Colonel, commanding the 5th Canadian Mounted Rifles. He was killed in action at Wieltje Salient, West Flanders, Belgium on June 2, 1916, during the Battle of Mount Sorrel. Baker was carried out of the action by his second-in-command Major Dennis Draper. He was buried at Poperinghe New Military Cemetery, where his gravestone bears the inscription: DEATH IS A LOW MIST WHICH CANNOT BLOT THE BRIGHTNESS IT MAY VEIL.

Baker's life and death were commemorated by the publication of A Canadian Soldier (1917). A memorial service was held at Christ Church in Sweetsburg, Quebec, on June 18, 1916. Tributes were paid by the Reverend W. P. R. Lewis and General Sir Sam Hughes, Minister of Militia. Baker's death was also marked by the Prime Minister of Canada Sir Robert Borden, with a statement published in the press and a further tribute given at the opening of parliament on January 18, 1917.

A bronze memorial statue to Baker by R. Tait McKenzie was unveiled on February 29, 1924, by Governor General Lord Byng in the House of Commons foyer in the Centre Block building of the Parliament of Canada in Ottawa, Canada. The Prime Minister of Canada William Lyon MacKenzie King spoke at the unveiling, and his speech and those of others were recorded in the red leather-bound commemorative volume Parliamentary Memoir of George Harold Baker, M.P. (1924). This volume also included a funerary poem for Baker: "Non Mortuus".

The base of the memorial statue bears the following inscription:

LIEUT-COLONEL GEORGE HAROLD BAKER, M.P., 5th C.M.R. KILLED IN ACTION, JUNE 2, 1916, AT THE BATTLE OF SANCTUARY WOOD. ERECTED BY ORDER OF THE PARLIAMENT OF CANADA.

Either side of the recess holding the memorial statue, there are inscriptions on the walls. The inscription to the left is a biblical quote (2 Maccabees 6.31) and the inscription to the right is the final five lines of the poem "In Flanders Fields" by John McCrae.

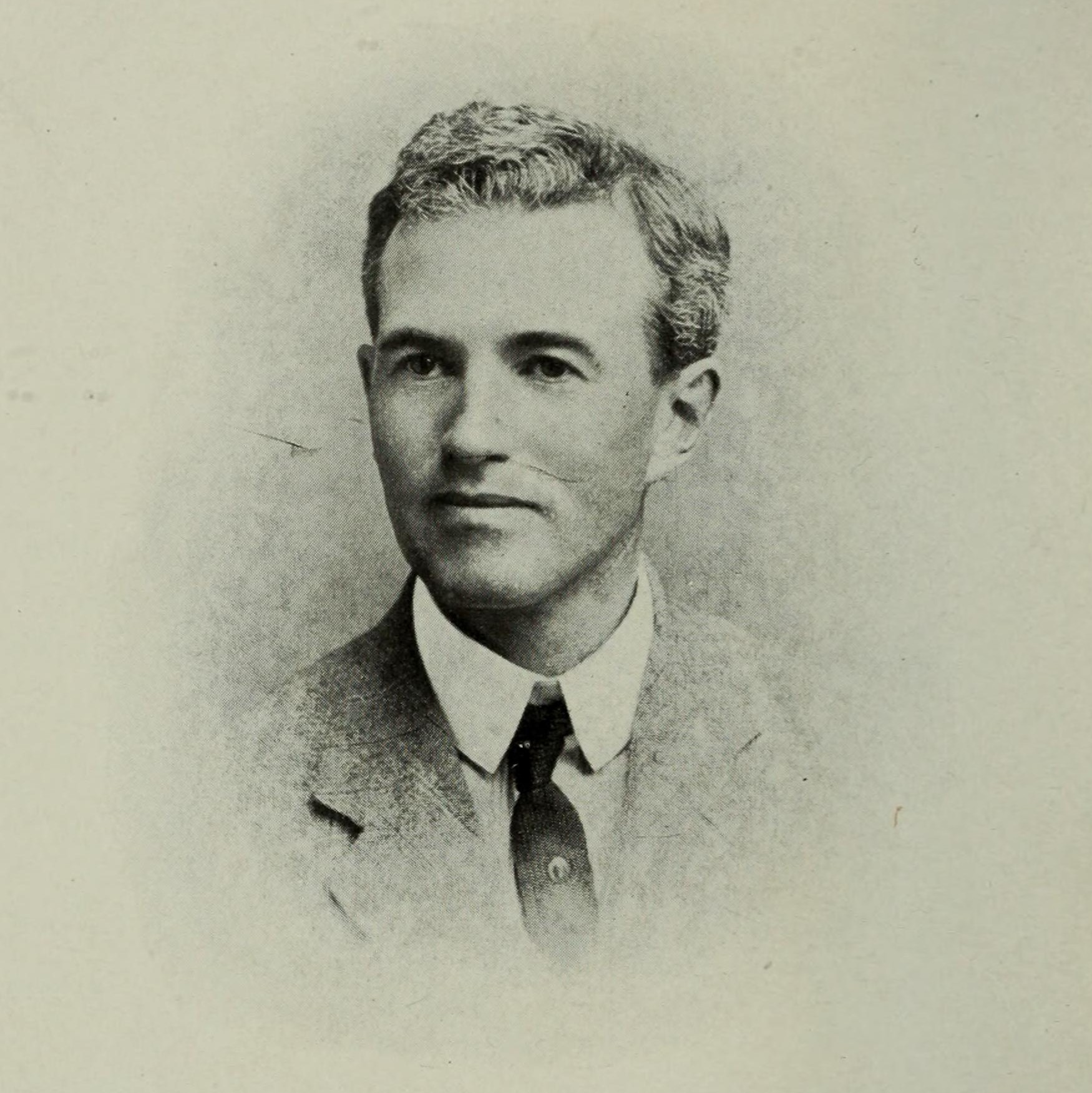
Glenmere, East Bolton, September 1911

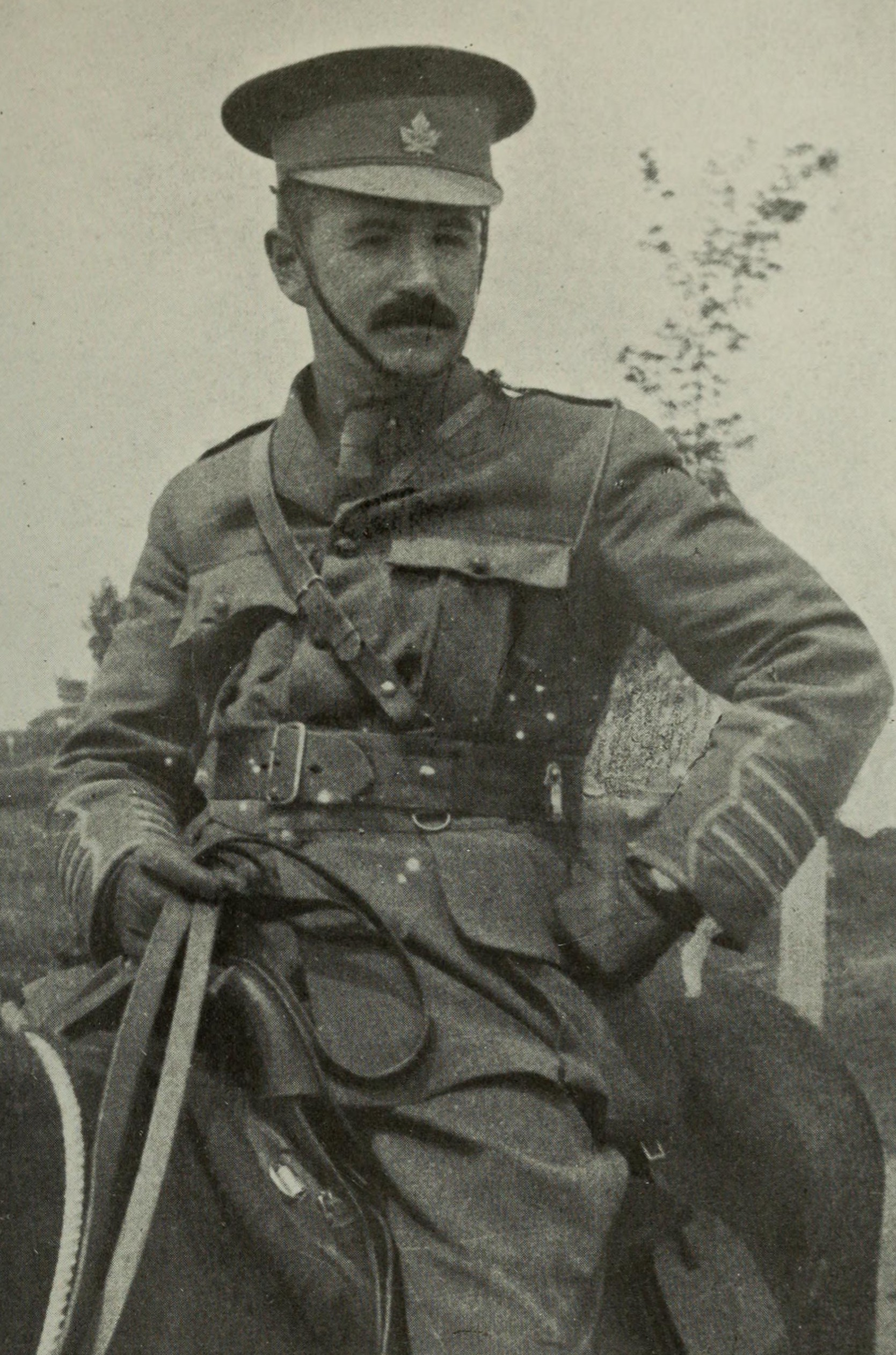
Camp Valcartier, July 1915

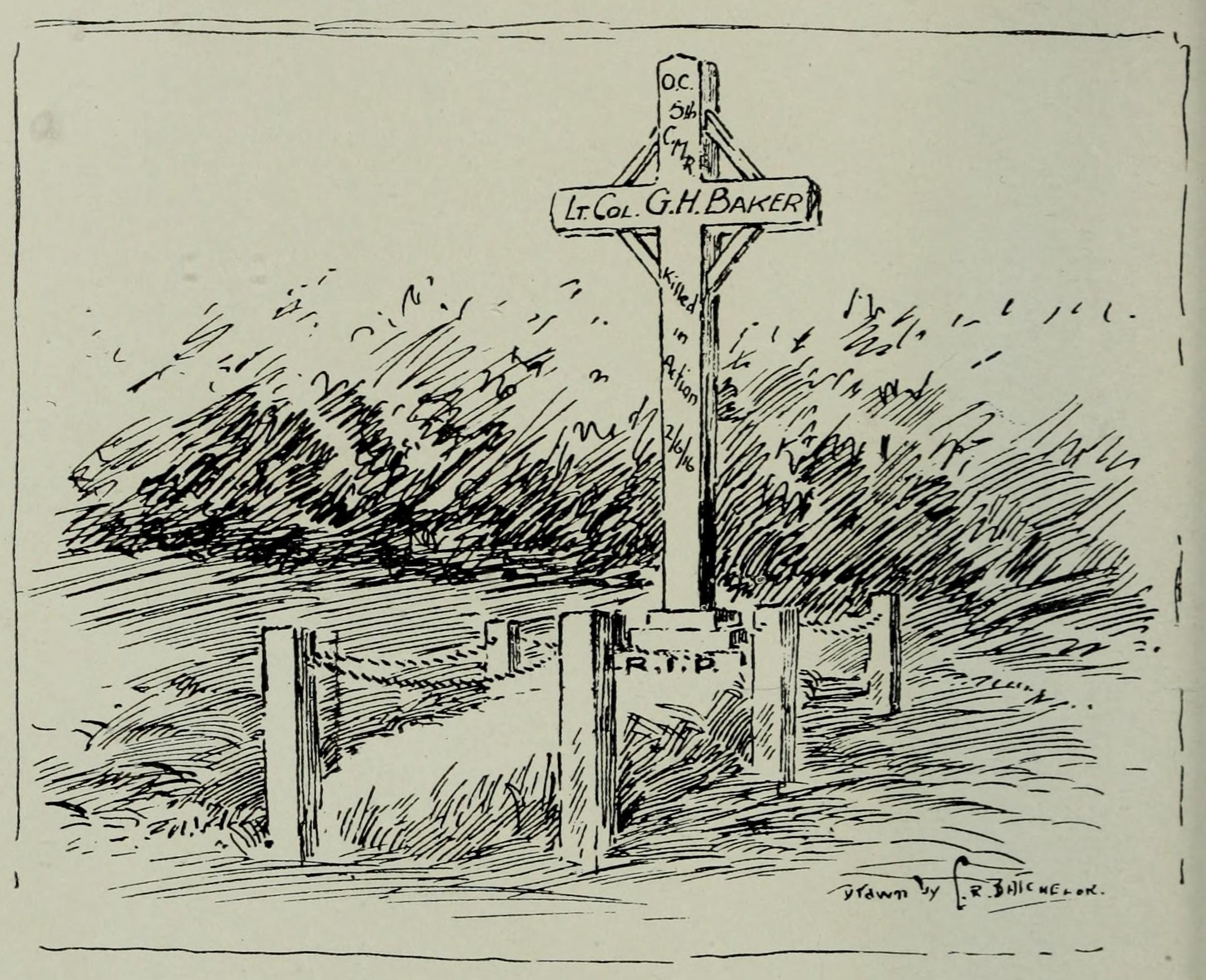
Baker's grave in Belgium

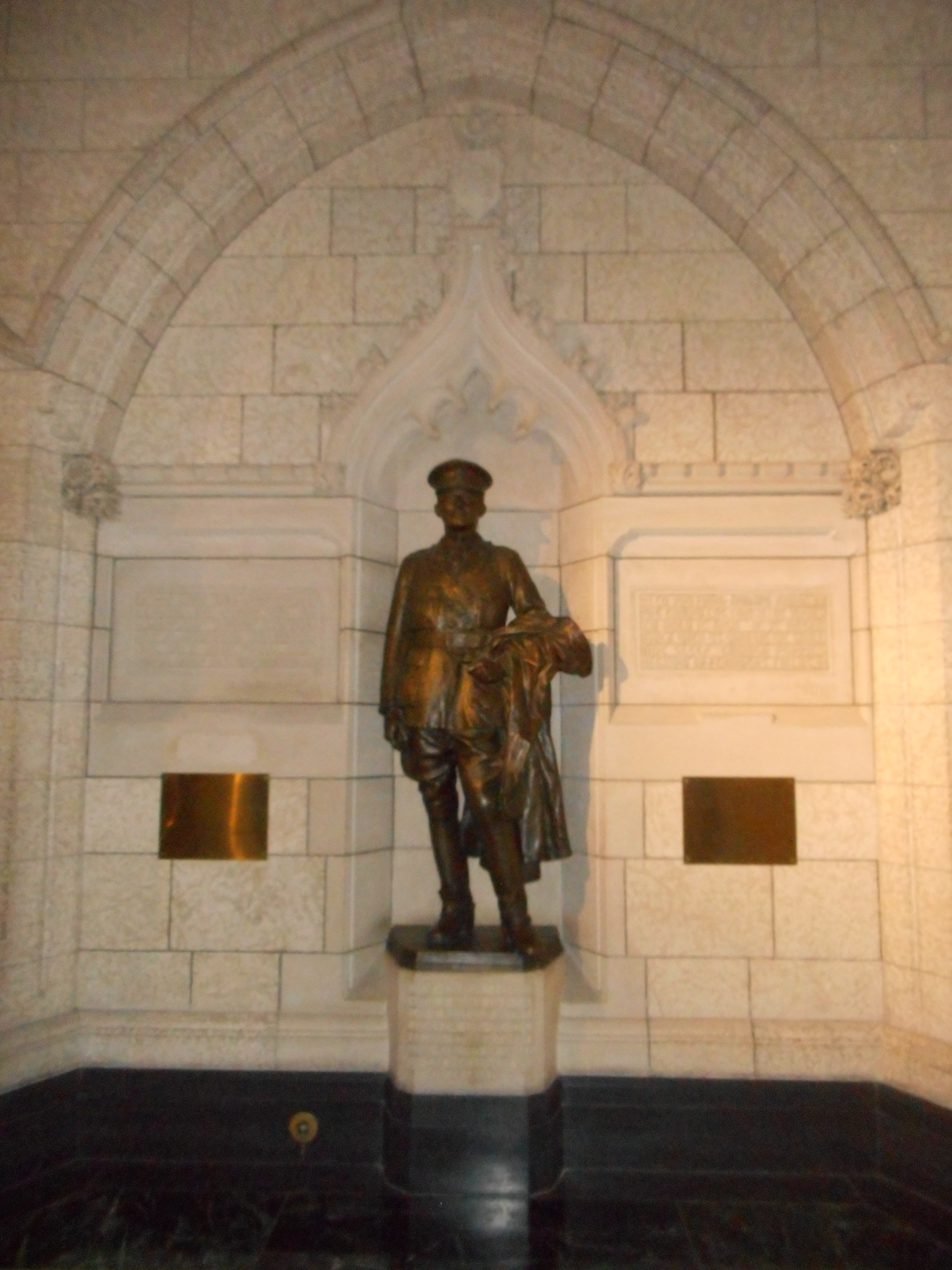
Baker memorial statue

== Electoral record ==
1911 Canadian federal election: Brome
Party	Candidate	Votes
Conservative	George Harold Baker	1,520
Liberal	Sydney Arthur Fisher	1,496

== See also ==
- List of Bishop's College School alumni
