= Pettes =

Surname list

Pettes is a surname. Notable people with the surname include:

- Nathaniel Pettes (1816–1889), Canadian politician from Quebec
- John Pettes (1793–1868), American businessman and civil servant

== See also ==
- Pettee
- Petter (given name)
- Pettis (surname)
