= Christopher Dunkin =

Canadian politician

The Hon. Christopher Dunkin
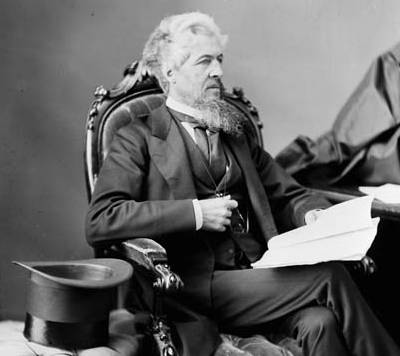

Member of the Legislative Assembly of the Province of Canada for Drummond—Arthabaska
- In office 1858–1861

Member of the Legislative Assembly of the Province of Canada for Brome
- In office 1862–1867

Member of the Canadian Parliament for Brome
- In office 1867–1871
- Succeeded by: Edward Carter

Member of the Legislative Assembly of Quebec for Brome
- In office 1867–1871
- Succeeded by: William Warren Lynch

Personal details
- Born: September 25, 1812 Walworth, London, England
- Died: January 6, 1881 (aged 68) Knowlton, Quebec
- Party: Conservative
- Other political affiliations: Conservative Party of Quebec
- Spouse(s): Mary Barber, daughter of Jonathan Barber
- Cabinet: Minister of Agriculture (1869-1871); Quebec Treasurer (1867-1869)

The Hon. Christopher Dunkin, PC QC (September 25, 1812 – January 6, 1881) was a Canadian editor, lawyer, teacher, judge, and politician.

== Early life ==
Born at Walworth, London, England, he was the son of Summerhayes Dunkin (1779-1823), of Horsleydown, Bermondsey, and Martha, daughter of John Hemming (1760–1825) of Twickenham, Middlesex. He was a first cousin of Hon. Edward John Hemming who came to Canada at his invitation. His family emigrated to New York in 1821, but his father died two years later, and his widow got remarried to the eccentric English surgeon, Jonathan Barber (1784–1864), Professor of Elocution at Harvard and Yale Universities, and Professor of Public speaking at McGill University. The "exceptionally intelligent" Dunkin had returned to Britain to study classics and mathematics at the University of London and the University of Glasgow but graduated from neither.

In 1831, Dunkin rejoined his mother and stepfather in North America, continuing his education at Harvard University for two more years. Again, he did not graduate, but Harvard still awarded him an honorary degree and appointed him tutor of Greek and Latin for 1834–35. That did not go well for him. His Freshman class provoked what became known as the Dunkin Rebellion in which classroom furniture and windows were broken, followed by disruptions in morning and evening prayers. Dunkin's contract was not renewed.

== Legal career ==
As a loyal British subject and conservative, Dunkin did not hold a favourable view of life in the United States and instead left for Montreal, where British patriotic fervour was at its peak. In 1837, he gained his first employment in Montreal as a correspondent for the Morning Courier. The following year, he was appointed secretary to the Education Commission and then to the Postal Service Commission before he became Deputy Provincial Secretary for Canada East, an office he retained from 1842 to 1847. His diplomatic nature enabled him to work easily between all of the political parties at a turbulent time in Canadian politics. In his spare time, Dunkin had started studying law in the offices of Alexander Buchanan and then Francis Godschall Johnson and was called to the Bar in 1846.

He became a partner in what was then Montreal's most prestigious law firm, Meredith & Bethune. In 1849, the founding partner, Meredith, accepted a judicial position in Quebec City and soon afterwards, Dunkin left to set up his own practice in the Eastern Townships, which was beginning to flourish but lacked talented lawyers. He established himself at Knowlton, Quebec.

== Political career ==
He was first elected to the Legislative Assembly of the Province of Canada in 1857 for the Quebec riding of Drummond—Arthabaska. He then represented the riding of Brome from 1862 until 1867. In 1864, he introduced a temperance act, known as the Dunkin Act. Dunkin was acclaimed for the Brome seat in the 1st Canadian Parliament in 1867 as a Conservative; he also represented the same riding provincially from 1867 to 1871. He was acclaimed again in 1869 by-election after he was appointed Minister of Agriculture. He resigned in 1871 when he was appointed a Puisne Justice of the Quebec Superior Court.

== Electoral record ==
1867 Canadian federal election: Brome
Party	Candidate	Votes
Conservative	Christopher Dunkin	acclaimed
Source: Canadian Elections Database

By-election: On Mr. Dunkin being called to the Privy Council and appointed Minister of Agriculture, 16 November 1869

By-election on 29 November 1869
Party	Candidate	Votes
Conservative	Christopher Dunkin	acclaimed
