= Edward Carter (politician) =

Canadian politician

Edward Brock Carter
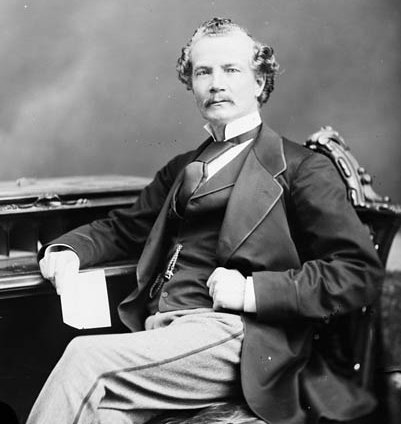

Member of the Canadian Parliament for Brome
- In office 1871–1874
- Preceded by: Christopher Dunkin
- Succeeded by: Nathaniel Pettes

Member of the Legislative Assembly of Quebec for Montréal-Centre
- In office 1867–1871
- Succeeded by: Luther Hamilton Holton

Personal details
- Born: 1 March 1822 Trois-Rivières, Lower Canada
- Died: 27 September 1883 (aged 61) Montreal, Quebec
- Party: Conservative

Edward Carter, QC (1 March 1822 – 27 September 1883) was a Canadian lawyer, professor and politician. Carter was a member of the House of Commons of Canada for the Brome electoral district in Quebec. He also represented Montréal-Centre in the Legislative Assembly of Quebec from 1867 to 1871. His name appears as Edward Brock Carter in some sources.

Born in Trois-Rivières, Lower Canada (now Quebec), the son of George Carter and Mary Ann Short, he was educated in Trois-Rivières and at the Collège de Nicolet. He worked as a manager in a commercial establishment from 1838 to 1840, then articled in law with Edward Short, Thomas Cushing Aylwin, F.W. Primrose and John Rose, was called to the Lower Canada bar in 1845 and set up practice in Montreal. Carter was crown clerk and associate clerk of the peace for Montreal district from 1862 to 1866. In 1862, he was named Queen's Counsel. Carter was an associate professor of criminal law and later professor emeritus at McGill University. He published A Treatise on the Law and Practice on Summary Convictions and Orders by Justices of the Peace in Upper and Lower Canada in 1856.

Carter was defeated in Montréal-Centre and in Châteauguay when he ran for reelection to the Quebec assembly in 1871. He served in the 1st Canadian Parliament for the Conservative party from 17 November 1871, replacing Christopher Dunkin. He was re-elected in the 1872 federal election and left politics after serving his full term in the 2nd Canadian Parliament.

He was a governor for Bishop's College and served as solicitor for the Montreal diocese of the Anglican church. In 1850, he married Mary Jane Kerr. Carter died in Montreal at the age of 61.

By-election on 17 November 1871
Party	Candidate	Votes
Conservative	Edward Carter	acclaimed

1872 Canadian federal election: Brome
Party	Candidate	Votes
Conservative	Edward Carter	1,037
Unknown	J.A. Perkins	602
Source: Canadian Elections Database
