= Pettee =

Pettee is a surname. Notable people with the surname include:

- Annah G. Pettee (1875–1959), American politician
- Julia Pettee (1872–1967), American librarian
- Pat Pettee (1863–1934), American baseball player

== See also ==
- Pettes
