= George Buchanan Foster =

Canadian politician

Member of the Legislative Council of Quebec for Victoria
- In office 21 August 1946 – 31 December 1968
- Preceded by: George Gordon Hyde
- Succeeded by: Institution abolished

Personal details
- Born: 19 August 1897 Montreal, Quebec, Canada
- Died: 3 June 1974 (aged 76) Montreal, Quebec, Canada
- Resting place: Knowlton Cemetery, Knowlton, Quebec
- Party: Union Nationale
- Relations: George Green Foster, father
- Education: McGill University
- Awards: Order of the British Empire, Distinguished Flying Cross

Military service
- Allegiance: Canada
- Branch/service: Canadian Expeditionary Force; Royal Flying Corps
- Rank: Lieutenant
- Unit: No. 24 Squadron RAF

Lieutenant George Buchanan Foster, MBE DFC QC (19 August 1897 – 3 June 1974) was a Canadian First World War flying ace. He was credited with seven aerial victories.

After the First World War, Foster would become a King's Counsel and prominent attorney as a principal in a major law firm, as well as being appointed a member of the Legislative Council of Quebec.

== Early life ==
George Buchanan Foster was born on 19 August 1897 in Montreal, Quebec, Canada. His mother was Mary Maud Buchanan; his father was Senator George Green Foster. He had one sister, Ruth Elizabeth Foster. He was the great-grandson of Alexander Buchanan, a noted lawyer and judge.

When George Buchanan Foster joined the Canadian Expeditionary Force to serve in the First World War, he was a single student.

== First World War ==
On 13 November 1917, Foster was commissioned as a temporary second lieutenant on probation.

After training, he was assigned to 24 Squadron in France as a SE.5a pilot from 8 March to 27 August 1918. During this posting, he destroyed an observation balloon, two Pfalz D.III fighters, a Fokker Triplane, and a Hannover two-seater; he also shared in destruction of a Hannover, and drove a Fokker Triplane down out of control. His exploits won him a Distinguished Flying Cross, which was gazetted on 2 November 1918.

== After the First World War ==
After the First World War ended, "Bunny" Foster returned to Montreal, Canada and married Barbara Helen MacDougall.

He studied law at McGill University, with his prior education having been at Lower Canada College and the High School of Montreal. He was admitted to the Bar of Quebec on 16 July 1920, and practised law in Montreal, becoming King's Counsel on 10 January 1931. He became a principal in his own law firm of Foster, Hannen, Watt, Leggatt, and Colby.

George Buchanan Foster was awarded the Order of the British Empire on 1 July 1946.

He was appointed to the Legislative Council of Quebec on 21 August 1946, and served there until the abolition of that institution in 1968.

In addition to his legal career, he served as president of the Children's Memorial Hospital of Montreal and was a member of the Protestant Board of Education for the province of Quebec. He served as president of Canada and Dominion Sugar Co. Ltd. and of Wire Rope Industries of Canada Ltd. and vice-president of Noranda Mines Ltd. He served on the boards of many companies, including IAC Ltd., Travelers Insurance, Brompton Pulp & Paper, Acme Glove, Holt Renfrew, Lake St. John's Paper, Montreal Trust, St. Lawrence Corporation, Sherbrooke Machinery, Donnacona Paper, Sagamo Penmans, Gaspe Copper, 7Up, J. S. Mitchell, Combustion Engineering Superheater, Hilton of Canada and British Bank Note.

He died on 3 June 1974 and was buried in Knowlton Cemetery, Knowlton, Quebec, Canada.

== Bibliography ==
- Christopher F. Shores; Norman L. R. Franks; Russell Guest (1990). Above the Trenches: A Complete Record of the Fighter Aces and Units of the British Empire Air Forces 1915–1920. Grub Street. ISBN 0-948817-19-4. also ISBN 978-0-948817-19-9.
- Ernest J. Chambers; Pierre G. Normandin (1918). Canadian Parliamentary Guide: Guide parlementaire canadien, The. P. G. Normandin.
- William Fong (2008). J.W. McConnell: Financier, Philanthropist, Patriot. McGill-Queen's Press – MQUP. ISBN 978-0-7735-3270-0. also ISBN 978-0-7735-3270-0.
