= 13th Dragoons =

13th Dragoons or 13th Dragoon Regiment may refer to the following military units:

- 13th Hussars, British Army unit active 1715–1922, and called by this name 1751–1783
- 13th Dragoon Regiment of the French Army, the 13th Parachute Dragoon Regiment since 1952
- 13th Scottish Light Dragoons, Canadian Militia unit active 1904-1936
