= Sydney Arthur Fisher =

Canadian politician

The Honourable Sydney Arthur Fisher PC
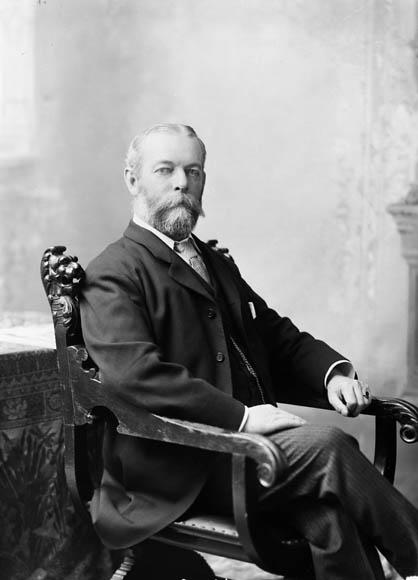

Member of the Canadian Parliament for Brome
- In office 1882–1891
- Preceded by: David Ames Manson
- Succeeded by: Eugène Alphonse Dyer
- In office 1896–1911
- Preceded by: Eugène Alphonse Dyer
- Succeeded by: George Harold Baker

Personal details
- Born: June 12, 1850 Montreal, Canada East
- Died: April 9, 1921 (aged 70) Ottawa, Ontario
- Party: Liberal
- Spouse: unmarried
- Education: McGill University
- Cabinet: Minister of Agriculture (1896-1911)

Sydney Arthur Fisher, PC (June 12, 1850 – April 9, 1921) was a Canadian politician, who served as Minister of Agriculture during the regime of Prime Minister Sir Wilfrid Laurier from 1896-1911.

Born in Montreal, Canada East, he was educated at the High School of Montreal, McGill University, and finally Trinity College, Cambridge.

A farmer, he first ran for the House of Commons of Canada in an 1880 by-election for the riding of Brome, for the Liberals, following the death of Edmund Leavens Chandler. Although defeated by Liberal-Conservative David Ames Manson, he was elected in 1882 (when Manson was not a candidate) and again in 1887. In the 1891 election, he lost to Conservative candidate Eugène Alphonse Dyer by 3 votes. When Dyer's win was challenged, he did not run in the subsequent by-election in 1892 when Dyer was acclaimed. However, he was elected again in the pivotal 1896 election, and re-elected in 1900, 1904, 1908 elections, where he was a key member of the Wilfrid Laurier Cabinet as Minister of Agriculture. He was defeated in the 1911, that also saw the end of the Laurier government, and then in a 1913 by-election in Chateauguay, following the death of his former colleague James Pollock Brown, when he lost to James Morris.

There is a Sydney Arthur Fisher fonds at Library and Archives Canada.

He was the uncle of Philip Sydney Fisher (1896-1983), who became President of the Southam Inc. Publishing chain, and married the granddaughter of founder William Southam.

== Electoral record ==
By-election on 18 October 1880
Party	Candidate	Votes
Liberal–Conservative	David Ames Manson	1,217
Liberal	Sydney Arthur Fisher	1,099

1882 Canadian federal election: Brome
Party	Candidate	Votes
Liberal	Sydney Arthur Fisher	1,399
Unknown	S.N. Boright	1,240

1887 Canadian federal election: Brome
Party	Candidate	Votes
Liberal	Sydney Arthur Fisher	1,570
Conservative	James Burnett	1,191

1891 Canadian federal election: Brome
Party	Candidate	Votes
Conservative	Eugène Alphonse Dyer	1,456
Liberal	Sydney Arthur Fisher	1,453

By-election: On Mr. Brown's death, 30 May 1913

By-election on 11 October 1913
Party	Candidate	Votes
Conservative	James Morris	1,412
Liberal	Sydney Arthur Fisher	1,267
