= David Ames Manson =

Canadian politician

David Ames Manson (24 December 1841 – 9 February 1929) was a Canadian merchant and political figure in Quebec. He represented Brome in the House of Commons of Canada as a Liberal-Conservative member from 1880 to 1882.

He was born in Mansonville, Canada East, the son of Robert Manson, of Scottish descent, and was educated at Knowlton, Stanstead and Waterloo. In 1866, he married Mary Eliza Manson. Manson served as postmaster for Mansonville from 1865 to 1880. He was elected to the House of Commons in an 1880 by-election held after the death of Edmund Leavens Chandler. Manson was a director of the Canadian Agricultural Insurance Company and the Missisquoi and Black River Railway.
