= Eugène Alphonse Dyer =

Canadian politician

Eugène Alphonse Dyer (12 December 1838 – 2 December 1911) was a merchant, farmer and political figure in Quebec. He represented Brome in the House of Commons of Canada from 1891 to 1896 as a Conservative member.

He was born in Sutton, Lower Canada, the son of George C. Dyer. Dyer served on the council for Sutton and was mayor and county warden. He also served as secretary-treasurer for the township school commission. His election in 1891 was overturned after an appeal but Dyer won the by-election that followed in 1892. He was married twice: to Harriet Jackson in 1860 and then to Adaline J. Carpenter in 1869.

== Electoral record ==
1891 Canadian federal election: Brome
Party	Candidate	Votes
Conservative	Eugène Alphonse Dyer	1,456
Liberal	Sydney Arthur Fisher	1,453

By-election: On Mr. Dyer being unseated

By-election on 10 March 1892
Party	Candidate	Votes
Conservative	Eugène Alphonse Dyer	acclaimed
