= Commission scolaire du Val-des-Cerfs =

School district in Quebec, Canada

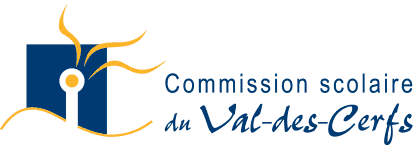

Location
- Montérégie Quebec; Canada

District information
- Type: School district
- Established: 1988
- Schools: Elementary schools (35); High schools (7); Adult education (2)

Other information
- Website: www.csvdc.qc.ca

The Commission scolaire du Val-des-Cerfs was a francophone school district in the Canadian province of Quebec. It comprised several primary schools and high schools across twenty-nine municipalities in the Montérégie region. The commission was overseen by a board of elected school trustees. It was the result of the 1998 reforms in education which led to the fusion of the school districts Des Cantons, Des Rivières and Davignon.

== Schools ==
In September 2014, Commission scolaire du Val-des-Cerfs covered 46 schools.

=== Elementary schools (35) ===
- École de L'Assomption, (Granby)
- École Ave Maria, (Granby)
- École Centrale, (Saint-Joachim-de-Shefford)
- École Curé-A.-Petit, (Cowansville)
- École de la Chantignole, (Bromont)
- École de la Clé-des-Champs, (Dunham)
- École de la Moisson-d'Or, (Saint-Alphonse-de-Granby)
- École de l'Étincelle, (Granby)
- École de l'Orée-des-Cantons, (Waterloo)
- École des Bâtisseurs (Granby)
- École du Phénix, (Granby)
- École du Premier-Envol, (Bedford)
- École Eurêka, (Granby)
- École Joseph-Poitevin, (Granby)
- École Mgr-Desranleau, (Bedford)
- École Mgr-Douville, (Farnham)
- École Notre-Dame-de-Lourdes, (Saint-Armand)
- École Roxton Pond, (Roxton Pond)
- École Saint-André, (Granby)
- École Saint-Bernard, (Granby)
- École Saint-Édouard, (Lac-Brome)
- École Saint-François-d'Assise, (Frelighsburg)
- École Saint-Jacques, (Farnham)
- École Saint-Jean, (Granby)
- École Saint-Joseph, (Granby)
- École Saint-Joseph, (Notre-Dame-de-Stanbridge)
- École Saint-Léon, (Cowansville)
- École Saint-Romuald, (Farnham)
- École Saint-Vincent-Ferrier, (Bromont)
- École Sainte-Cécile, (Sainte-Cécile-de-Milton)
- École Sainte-Famille, (Granby)
- École Sainte-Thérèse, (Cowansville)
- École Sutton, (Sutton)

=== High schools (7) ===
- École de la Haute-Ville, (Granby)
- École Jean-Jacques-Bertrand, (Farnham)
- École Joseph-Hermas-Leclerc, (Granby)
- École L'Envolée, (Granby)
- École Massey-Vanier, (Cowansville)
- École Mgr-Desranleau, (Bedford)
- École Wilfrid-Léger, (Waterloo)
- École Secondaire du Verbe Divin, (Granby) (only for transportation) (Private School)

=== School for adults (2) ===
- Campus de Brome-Missisquoi (CBM), (Cowansville). Used to be known as Centre d'éducation des adultes et de formation professionnelle, renamed in 2008 during its expansion.
- Centre régional intégré de formation (CRIF), (Granby). Inaugurated in 1967.
