= CIDI-FM =

Coordinates: 45°11′10″N 72°35′18″W

- Brome Lake, Quebec; Canada
- Frequency: 99.1 FM

Ownership
- Owner: Radio communautaire Missisquoi

History
- First air date: 2003 (licensed)

Technical information
- Class: A
- ERP: horizontal polarization only: 483 watts average 1.45 kWs peak
- HAAT: 50.2 meters (165 ft)

Links
- Website: www.cidi991.com

CIDI-FM is an English language community radio station with French programming that broadcasts at 99.1 FM in Brome Lake, Quebec, Canada.

Owned by Radio communautaire Missisquoi, a non-profit organization, the station was licensed in 2003.

Previous logo
