= Philip S. Fisher =

Canadian businessman (1896–1983)

Philip Sydney Fisher, OC, CBE, DSO, DSC (31 March 1896 – 17 December 1983) was a Canadian businessman. He was president of the Southam Company Ltd. (later Southam Inc.) from 1945 to 1961 and chairman from 1961.

During the First World War, Fisher served as a pilot with the Royal Naval Air Service, flying submarine patrols and then fighter missions. He shot down at least three German airplanes before being wounded in 1917. He achieved the rank of captain.

He was the nephew of Sydney Fisher.
