= 13th Scottish Light Dragoons =

- Active: 1866–1936
- Country: Province of Canada 1866–1867; Canada 1867–1936
- Branch: Canadian Militia
- Type: Light dragoons
- Role: Cavalry
- Part of: Non-Permanent Active Militia
- Garrison/HQ: Waterloo, Quebec
- Mottos: Virtute et Labore (Latin for 'Through courage and labour') (the Dundonald motto)
- Colors: Facing colour yellow
- Engagements: First World War

Insignia
- Tartan: "Government or Black Watch". Archived from the original on 18 January 2008.

The 13th Scottish Light Dragoons was a cavalry regiment of the Non-Permanent Active Militia of the Canadian Militia (now the Canadian Army).

== History ==
Founded as the 52nd Bedford Battalion of Infantry in Knowlton, Canada East, on 14 September 1866, the unit was re-designated the 52nd Brome Battalion in 1872. Thereafter, the 52nd Brome Battalion and the 79th Shefford Regiment were amalgamated to form the 79th Shefford and Brome Regiment (Highlanders). This regiment was not associated with the 79th Cameron Highlanders of Canada. The regiment was amalgamated with 52nd Regiment (Brome Light Infantry) in 1901 under the 79th's name. In 1904, the regiment was amalgamated with 'C' and 'D' Squadrons of the 6th Duke of Connaught's Royal Canadian Hussars and titled the 13th Scottish Light Dragoons.

The regiment was reorganized in 1921. On 1 February 1936, The 13th Scottish Light Dragoons were disbanded along with 13 other regiments as part of the 1936 Canadian Militia Reorganization.

== Alliances ==
- United Kingdom - Scots Guards (Until 1936)

== Uniform ==
The 13th Scottish Light Dragoons wore a blue cap with a diced border, a scarlet dragoon tunic with yellow facings, and blue pantaloons with yellow stripe.

== Notable Members ==
- Brigadier-General Charles Allan Smart CMG
- Lieutenant-Colonel George Harold Baker

== See also ==
- List of regiments of cavalry of the Canadian Militia (1900–1920)
- Canadian-Scottish regiment
