= Brome Lake, Quebec =

Brome Lake Lac-Brome
- Town
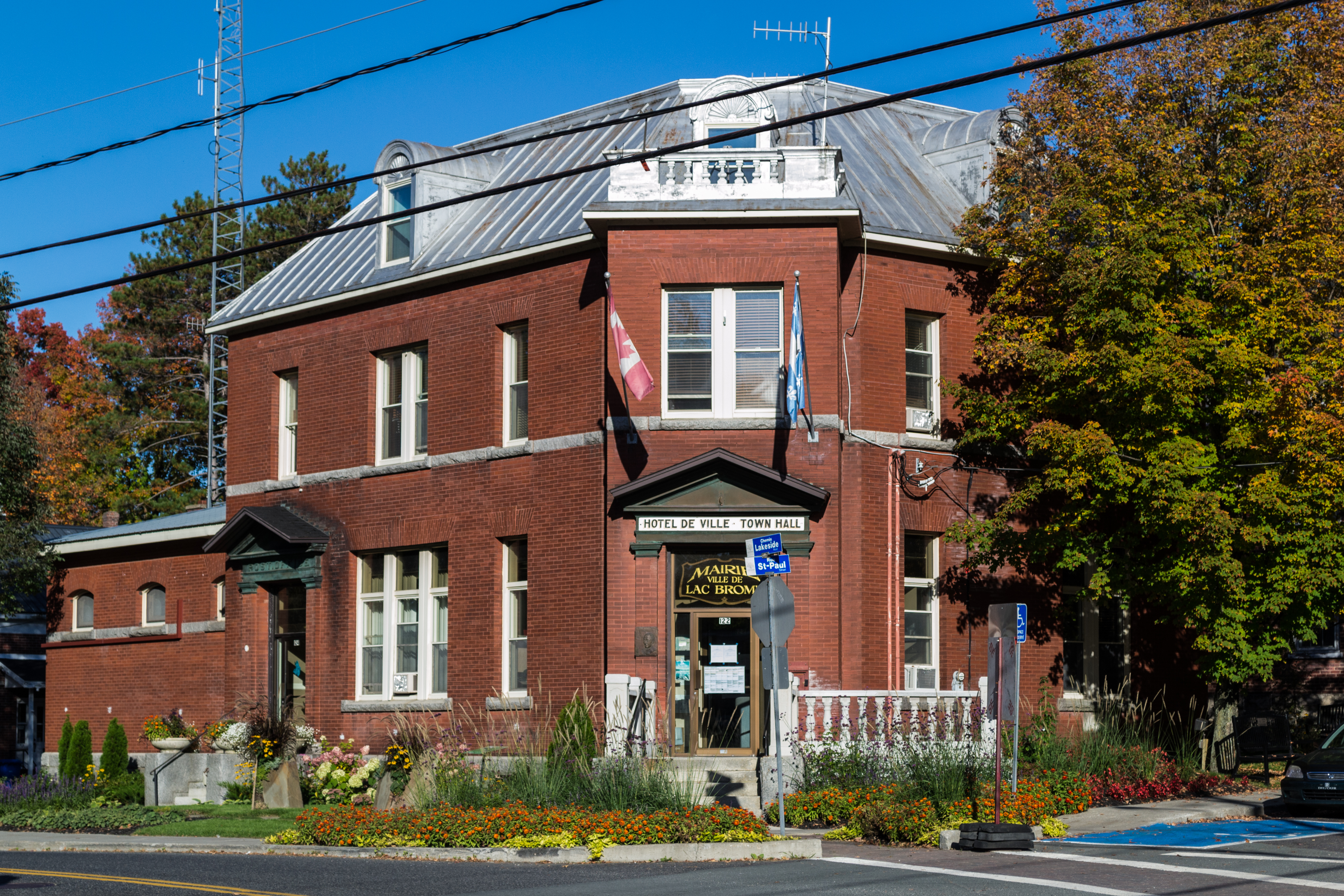
- Brome Lake Town Hall

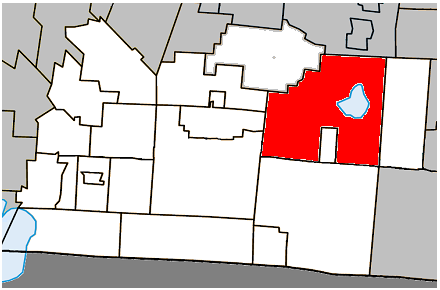
- Location within Brome-Missisquoi RCM.

- Location in southern Quebec.
- Coordinates: 45°13′N 72°31′W
- Country: Canada
- Province: Quebec
- Region: Estrie
- RCM: Brome-Missisquoi
- Constituted: January 2, 1971

Government
  - Mayor: Lee Patterson
  - Federal riding: Brome—Missisquoi
  - Prov. riding: Brome-Missisquoi

Area
  - Total: 223.60 km^{2} (86.33 sq mi)
  - Land: 205.27 km^{2} (79.26 sq mi)

Population (2021)
  - Total: 5,923
  - Density: 28.6/km^{2} (74/sq mi)
  - Pop 2016-2021: ▲7.8%
  - Dwellings: 3,683
- Time zone: UTC−5 (EST)
  - Summer (DST): UTC−4 (EDT)
- Postal code(s): J0E
- Area codes: 450 and 579
- Highways: R-104; R-139; R-215; R-243
- Website: lacbrome.ca

The Town of Brome Lake (officially Ville de Lac-Brome) is a town in the Brome-Missisquoi Regional County Municipality in the Estrie region of southern Quebec, Canada. In the 2021 Canadian Census, Brome Lake had a population of 5,923.

Brome Lake was created in 1971 through the merger of the Township of Brome with the village municipalities of Knowlton and Foster. Its territory also includes Bondville, East Hill, Fulford, Iron Hill, and West Brome.

== Toponymy ==
The town is named after Brome Lake. The lake took its name from Brome Township, which appears on a map by Gale and Durberger dating from 1795. The Commission de toponymie du Quebec traces the name "Brome" to English toponymy, most likely the village of Brome, Suffolk, although Brome Hall, the seat of the Cornwallis family, has also been suggested as its source.

== History ==
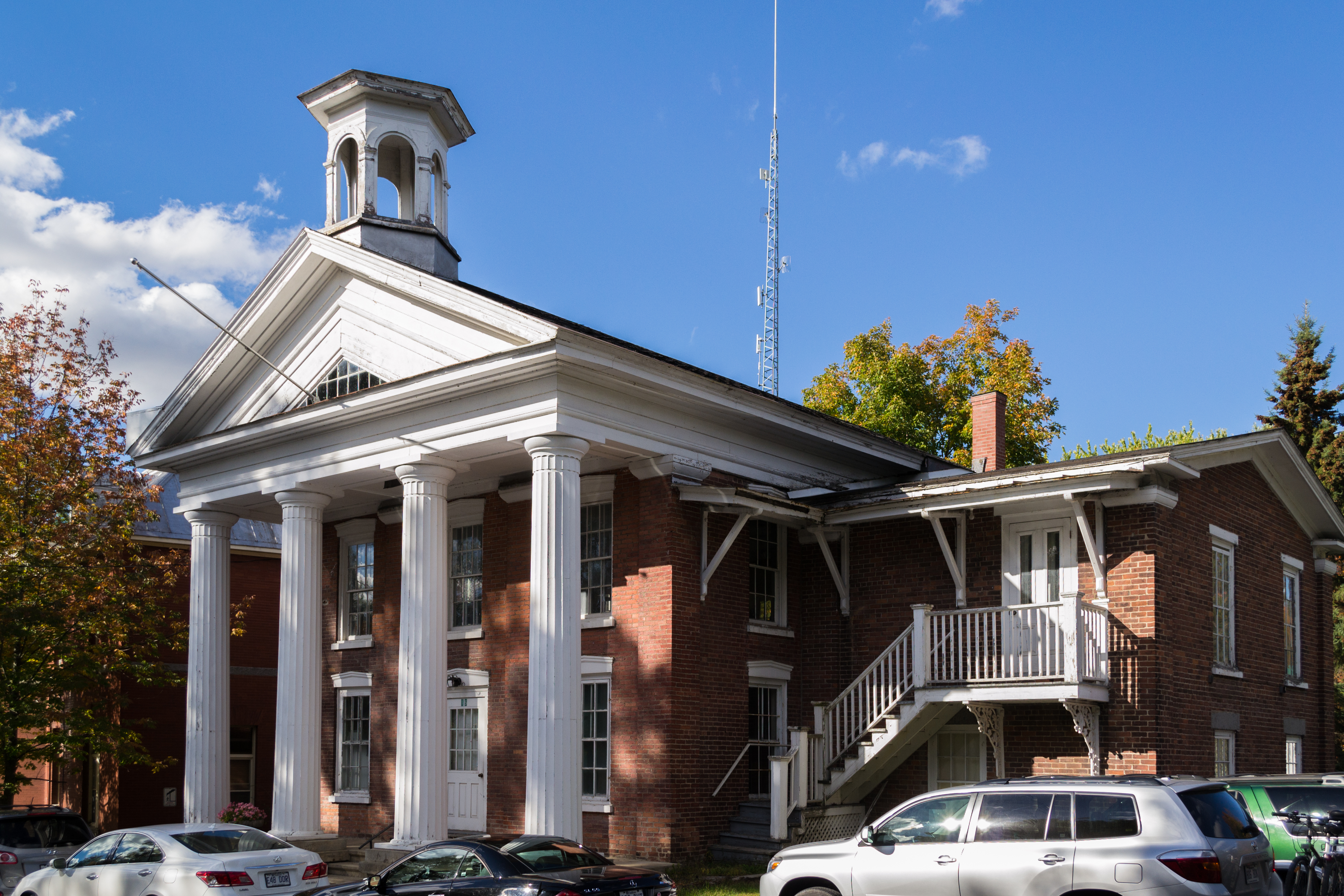
The Old Court House and Registry Office of Brome County.

Archaeological research in the Brome-Missisquoi region documents indigenous presence dating back over 5,000 years. A five-year archaeological program identified 19 sites in the region, 18 of them prehistoric, with evidence from the Archaic and Woodland periods. The Brome Lake area lies within the traditional territory of the Wabanaki Nation.

Settlement in Brome Township began in the 1790s. Jonathan Hart settled in the southern part of the township in 1794, Henry Collins arrived near the Dunham boundary the following year, and Ebenezer Collins settled at what became West Brome in 1796. Brome Township was formally proclaimed in 1797. The early settlers came mainly from New England and New York; some were Loyalists while others came north in search of land.

The settlement that became Knowlton developed later. Matthew Morehouse of Massachusetts was among the first settlers in the immediate area, followed by John Capel of Vermont. Paul Holland Knowlton moved to the present village site in 1834, where he established a sawmill and later a forge, store, and flour mill. The settlement was known as Coldbrook until the opening of the Knowlton post office in 1851.

Knowlton became the county seat of Brome County in 1855 and was incorporated as a village municipality in 1888. Foster became a separate village municipality in 1917.

The present town of Brome Lake was formed in 1971 when the Township of Brome merged with Knowlton and Foster. Bondville, East Hill, Fulford, Iron Hill and West Brome, which had formed part of the surrounding township, became part of the new town.

== Geography ==
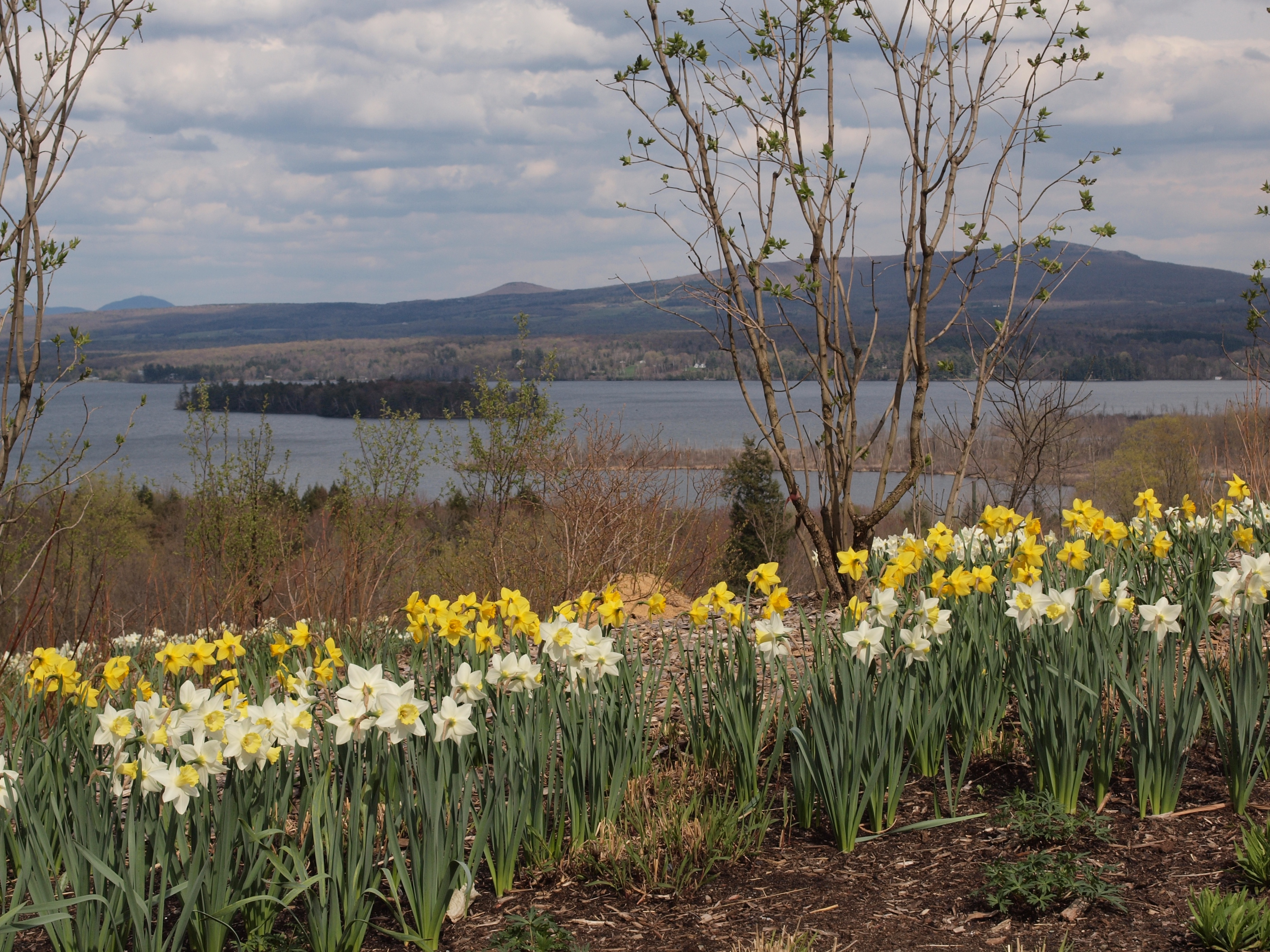
The eponymous Brome Lake.

Brome Lake has a land area of 206.90 km². Brome Lake, which covers about 15 km², lies within the municipality and is the source of the Yamaska River. The Village of Brome is surrounded on three sides by the Town of Brome Lake.

The area lies within the Appalachian Mountains geological region. Bedrock around Brome Lake includes the Sutton Schists and related metamorphic units, with schist, quartzite, and metavolcanic rocks occurring in the area. Glacial deposits cover much of the lower terrain. A federal soil survey of Brome County recorded loamy and sandy loam tills, derived from schist and sandstone, together with deposits of outwash sand and gravel.

The Blandford soil series is widespread in Brome and Shefford areas. It developed mainly in loamy glacial till derived from schist and sandstone, and is generally found on rolling or hilly ground. The survey described maple, birch, and beech as the principal natural vegetation on Blandford loam. Where cultivated, it supported hay and crops including oats, corn and potatoes. The series is now classified in Quebec as a Sombric Brunisol and remains associated with the Sutton Mountains and other Appalachian uplands of southern Quebec.

The survey also identified Knowlton gravelly sandy loam, found mainly in Brome County. This soil developed in gravelly glacial outwash containing slate, schist, sandstone and igneous material, and is generally well to excessively drained.

Historical Census Data - Lac-Brome, Quebec
Year	Pop.	±%
1991	4,824	—
1996	5,073	+5.2%
2001	5,444	+7.3%
2006	5,629	+3.4%
2011	5,609	−0.4%
2016	5,495	−2.0%
2021	5,923	+7.8%

== Demographics ==
In the 2021 Census of Population conducted by Statistics Canada, Lac-Brome had a population of 5,923 living in 2,828 of its 3,683 total private dwellings, a change of 7.8% from its 2016 population of 5,495. With a land area of 206.9 km^{2} (79.9 sq mi), it had a population density of 28.6/km^{2} (74.1/sq mi) in 2021.

Canada census – Lac-Brome, Quebec community profile

	2021	2011
Population	5,923 (+7.8% from 2016)	5,609 (-0.4% from 2006)
Land area	206.90 km^{2} (79.88 sq mi)	205.27 km^{2} (79.26 sq mi)
Population density	28.6/km^{2} (74/sq mi)	27.3/km^{2} (71/sq mi)
Median age	58 (M: 58, F: 58.4)	53.3 (M: 52.6, F: 54.0)
Private dwellings	2,828 (total)	3,473 (total)
Median household income		$53,881

References: 2021 2011

Canada Census Mother Tongue - Lac-Brome, Quebec
Census	Total	French			English			French & English			Other		
Year	Responses	Count	Trend	Pop %	Count	Trend	Pop %	Count	Trend	Pop %	Count	Trend	Pop %
2011	5,450	2,640	▲6.5%	48.44%	2,545	▼1.2%	46.70%	65	▼53.6%	1.19%	200	▼18.4%	3.67%
2006	5,440	2,480	▲10.5%	45.59%	2,575	▼10.4%	47.33%	140	▲180.0%	2.57%	245	▲104.2%	4.50%
2001	5,290	2,245	▲30.9%	42.44%	2,875	▼3.4%	54.35%	50	▼50.0%	0.94%	120	▼31.4%	2.27%
1996	4,965	1,715	n/a	34.54%	2,975	n/a	59.92%	100	n/a	2.01%	175	n/a	3.52%

== Government ==
Brome Lake is governed by a mayor and six councillors. Each councillor represents one electoral district, and members are elected for four-year terms. Lee Patterson was elected mayor on November 2, 2025.

Town Council of Brome Lake
Council District	Councillor
Bondville-Fulford	Claude Rajotte
West Brome-Iron Hill	Steven Beerwort
East Hill	Pierre Laplante
Knowlton-Victoria	Lisa Payne
Knowlton-Lakeside	Patrick Ouvrard
Foster	Robert Laflamme

Mayors of Brome Lake
From	To	Name
1971	1987	Homer Blackwood
1987	1991	Gilles Decelles
1991	2009	Paul-Émile Noiseux
2009	2013	Gilles Decelles
2013	2025	Richard Burcombe
2025	INC.	Lee Patterson

== Education ==
- École Saint-Édouard, (CSVDC)
- Knowlton Academy (Eastern Townships School Board)

== Media ==
Brome Lake has one radio station serving its local area, the Knowlton-based CIDI-FM 99.1 MHz.

== In film ==
In 1967, Paramount Studios chose Knowlton as the location to film the children's movie My Side of the Mountain, an adaptation of a book by Jean Craighead George. Many scenes from the village were used as well as a man-made pond at the corner of Chemin Paramount and Chemin Paige near Mount Glen.

Knowlton was also used as a filming location in 1975 for "The Little Girl Who Lives Down the Lane", starring Jodie Foster.

== Notable people ==
- Paul Holland Knowlton
- Paul Martin
- Louise Penny

== See also ==
- List of anglophone communities in Quebec
- List of cities in Quebec
