= Andy McMaster (footballer) =

Australian rules footballer (1914–1998)

Personal information
- Full name: Andy McMaster
- Born: 11 May 1914
- Died: 12 May 1998 (aged 84)
- Original team: Romsey
- Height: 185 cm (6 ft 1 in)
- Weight: 87 kg (192 lb)

Playing career^{1}
Years	Club	Games (Goals)
1939	Footscray	2 (0)
- ^{1} Playing statistics correct to the end of 1939.

Andy McMaster (11 May 1914 – 12 May 1998) was an Australian rules footballer who played for the Footscray Football Club in the Victorian Football League (VFL).
