= Paul Holland Knowlton =

Canadian politician (1787–1863)

Paul Holland Knowlton (September 17, 1787 – August 28, 1863) was a businessman and political figure in Lower Canada and Canada East.

He was born in Newfane, Vermont in 1787, the son of Silas Knowlton (1764-1844) and Lucinda Holbrook, and the grandson of Luke Knowlton. He came to Lower Canada in 1798 with his family. After his mother died two years later, he went back to Newfane to live with his grandparents and complete his schooling. In 1807, he moved back to Stukely Township in Lower Canada. Knowlton settled on Brome Lake in Brome Township where he established a farm, general store and distillery. In 1830, he was elected to the Legislative Assembly of Lower Canada for Shefford County. Knowlton voted against the Ninety-Two Resolutions. He helped set up the Shefford County Agricultural Society and served as president. In 1834, he set up a sawmill in a new location and added a store and gristmill; this was to become the site of a new settlement called Coldbrook, later known as Knowlton.

Knowlton helped organize the local resistance against the Lower Canada Rebellion and was named lieutenant-colonel in the local militia. He was named to the Special Council that then administered the province by colonial administrator Sir John Colborne. In 1841, he was named to the Legislative Council of the Province of Canada. He signed the 1849 Montreal Annexation Manifesto proposing union with the United States, viewing this as the best way to ensure the future economic development of the region. He served as first warden for Brome County and was first president of the county agricultural society. He helped establish the Advertiser and Eastern Townships Sentinel with Lucius Seth Huntington in 1856.

He died in Knowlton in 1863.
