= Brome (federal electoral district) =

Former federal electoral district in Quebec, Canada

Quebec electoral district

Defunct federal electoral district
- Legislature: House of Commons
- District created: 1867
- District abolished: 1924
- First contested: 1867
- Last contested: 1921

Brome was a federal electoral district in the province of Quebec, Canada, that was represented in the House of Commons of Canada from 1867 to 1925.

It was created by the British North America Act, 1867, and was amalgamated into the Brome—Missisquoi electoral district in 1924.

The County of Brome consisted of the Townships of Bolton, Potton, Sutton, Brome and the eastern part of the Township of Farnham.

== Members of Parliament ==
This riding elected the following members of Parliament:

Parliament	Years	Member	Party
Brome
1st	1867–1869	Christopher Dunkin	Conservative
1st	1869–1871	Christopher Dunkin	Conservative
1st	1871–1872	Edward Carter	Conservative
2nd	1872–1874	Edward Carter	Conservative
3rd	1874–1878	Nathaniel Pettes	Liberal
4th	1878–1880	Edmund Leavens Chandler	Liberal
4th	1880–1882	David Ames Manson	Liberal–Conservative
5th	1882–1887	Sydney Arthur Fisher	Liberal
6th	1887–1891	Sydney Arthur Fisher	Liberal
7th	1891–1892	Eugène Alphonse Dyer	Conservative
7th	1892–1896	Eugène Alphonse Dyer	Conservative
8th	1896–1896	Sydney Arthur Fisher	Liberal
8th	1896–1900	Sydney Arthur Fisher	Liberal
9th	1900–1904	Sydney Arthur Fisher	Liberal
10th	1904–1908	Sydney Arthur Fisher	Liberal
11th	1908–1911	Sydney Arthur Fisher	Liberal
12th	1911–1916	George Harold Baker	Conservative
13th	1917–1921	Andrew Ross McMaster	Opposition (Laurier Liberals)
14th	1921–1925	Andrew Ross McMaster	Liberal
Riding dissolved into Brome—Missisquoi

== Election results ==
1867 Canadian federal election
Party	Candidate	Votes
Conservative	Christopher Dunkin	acclaimed
Source: Canadian Elections Database

By-election: On Mr. Dunkin being called to the Privy Council and appointed Minister of Agriculture, 16 November 1869

By-election on 29 November 1869
Party	Candidate	Votes
Conservative	Christopher Dunkin	acclaimed

By-election: On Mr. Dunkin being appointed Puisne Judge, Superior Court of Quebec, 25 October 1871

By-election on 17 November 1871
Party	Candidate	Votes
Conservative	Edward Carter	acclaimed

1872 Canadian federal election
Party	Candidate	Votes
Conservative	Edward Carter	1,037
Unknown	J.A. Perkins	602
Source: Canadian Elections Database

1874 Canadian federal election
Party	Candidate	Votes
Liberal	Nathaniel Pettes	acclaimed
Source: Canadian Elections Database

1878 Canadian federal election
Party	Candidate	Votes
Liberal	Edmund Leavens Chandler	1,272
Unknown	S.L. Foster	991

By-election: On Mr. Chandler's death, 21 August 1880

By-election on 18 October 1880
Party	Candidate	Votes
Liberal–Conservative	David Ames Manson	1,217
Liberal	Sydney Arthur Fisher	1,099

1882 Canadian federal election
Party	Candidate	Votes
Liberal	Sydney Arthur Fisher	1,399
Unknown	S.N. Boright	1,240

1887 Canadian federal election
Party	Candidate	Votes
Liberal	Sydney Arthur Fisher	1,570
Conservative	James Burnett	1,191

1891 Canadian federal election
Party	Candidate	Votes
Conservative	Eugène Alphonse Dyer	1,456
Liberal	Sydney Arthur Fisher	1,453

By-election: On Mr. Dyer being unseated

By-election on 10 March 1892
Party	Candidate	Votes
Conservative	Eugène Alphonse Dyer	acclaimed

1896 Canadian federal election
Party	Candidate	Votes
Liberal	Sydney Arthur Fisher	1,677
Conservative	George Green Foster	1,344

By-election: Mr. Fisher appointed Minister of Agriculture, 11 July 1896

By-election on 30 July 1896
Party	Candidate	Votes
Liberal	Sydney Arthur Fisher	acclaimed

1900 Canadian federal election
Party	Candidate	Votes
Liberal	Sydney Arthur Fisher	1,805
Conservative	Frederick England	1,249

1904 Canadian federal election
Party	Candidate	Votes
Liberal	Sydney Arthur Fisher	1,821
Conservative	E.P. Stevens	941

1908 Canadian federal election
Party	Candidate	Votes
Liberal	Sydney Arthur Fisher	1,674
Conservative	Frederick Albyn Olmstead	1,233
Independent	William Ulric Cotton	37

1911 Canadian federal election
Party	Candidate	Votes
Conservative	George Harold Baker	1,520
Liberal	Sydney Arthur Fisher	1,496

1917 Canadian federal election
Party	Candidate	Votes
Opposition (Laurier Liberals)	Andrew Ross McMaster	1,926
Government (Unionist)	Dennis Colburn Draper	1,488

1921 Canadian federal election
Party	Candidate	Votes
Liberal	Andrew Ross McMaster	3,768
Conservative	Joseph Boulay	2,163

== See also ==
- List of Canadian electoral districts
- Historical federal electoral districts of Canada
