= Julia Pettee =

American theological librarian

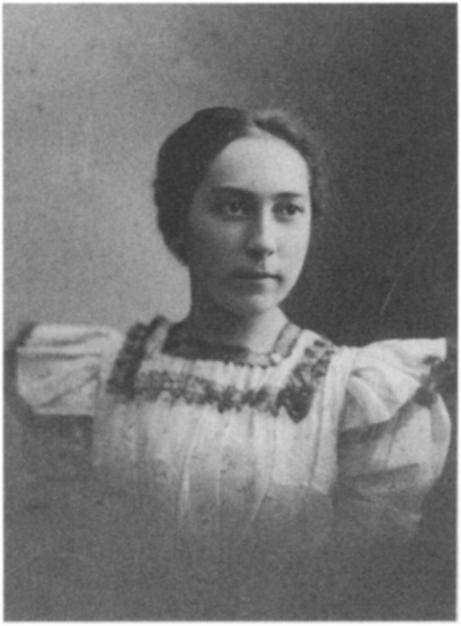
- Born: August 23, 1872; Lakeville, Connecticut, US
- Died: May 30, 1967 (aged 94); Salisbury, Connecticut, US
- Education: Mount Holyoke Seminary and College; Pratt Institute; Vassar College
- Occupation: Librarian

Julia Pettee (August 23, 1872 – May 30, 1967) was an American librarian best known for developing the Union Classification, used to classify theological books. Pettee served for thirty years as head cataloger of the Union Theological Seminary library and made fundamental contributions to cataloging theory and practice.

== Early life and library work ==
Julia Pettee was born in Lakeville, Connecticut on August 23, 1872. She attended Mount Holyoke Seminary and College until 1892, and graduated from the Pratt Institute Library School in Brooklyn in 1895. Pettee was one of the first generation of professionally trained librarians.

She continued her education at Vassar College, while working half time in the library as a cataloger. She received her A.B. degree in 1899. She worked at Vassar until 1909; during that time, she also took leaves of absence to reorganize and catalog the Rochester Theological Seminary library collection.

From 1909 until 1939, she worked as the head cataloger at Union Theological Seminary in New York. In addition to developing the library's classification scheme, she also developed specialized lists of subject headings and church names for theological libraries. During her time at Union, she took a leave of absence to work at the Library of Congress, assisting in the development of the religion section of the Library of Congress Classification. She was active in the American Library Association, including her work on the Catalog Code Revision Advisory Committee revising the cataloging code of 1908; Pettee chaired the subcommittee on religious headings. She was a member of the Decimal Classification Committee of the American Library Association in 1922. Her 1936 article "The Development of Authorship Entry and the Formation of Authorship Rules as Found in the Anglo-American Code" has been described as "the base of modern conceptions of editions, works, literary, and bibliographical units".

== Union Classification ==
When Pettee arrived at Union Theological Seminary, books were shelved via a fixed location system, with each book marked with the shelf where it had been placed. She determined that none of the existing classification schemes were adequate; what "was needed was not another general classification scheme or a classification for theology only but a hybrid scheme to look at the whole world of knowledge from the perspective of the theologian and student of theology, encompassing all the works in Union's collection."

Pettee was inspired by the arrangement of exhibits created by Hugo Münsterberg for the Congress of Arts and Sciences held during the Saint Louis World's Fair in 1904, emphasizing the interrelationship of areas of human knowledge. She also took inspiration from Alfred Cave's An Introduction to Theology and Charles R. Gillett’s classed catalog.

The Classification of the Library of Union Theological Seminary in the City of New York was first published in 1924; a revised edition was published in 1939, and a second revised edition was published in 1967, edited by Ruth C. Eisenhart. It used both letters and numbers in its notation, following the Cutter Classification. The arrangement of the theology sections were devised by Pettee; she used parts of the Library of Congress Classification for arranging non-religious material. As in the LC classification and the Dewey Decimal Classification, separate tables allowed for subdivision by form or geographic area. On the publication of its revised edition, the Union classification was "the most comprehensive scheme for the arrangement of religious literature now published in any language."

The main divisions of the classification were:

- Historical Sciences, including general and introductory materials, literature, and history;
- Experimental Sciences Dealing with the Material Universe and Mental Phenomena, including astronomy, physics, chemistry, and psychology;
- Normative or Speculative Sciences, including philosophy, theory of religion, and various theological systems and theories; and
- Practical Sciences, including social institutions and activities, education, religious institutions and activities, and organized Christianity.

The classification was adopted by more than fifty libraries, growing in popularity in the 1940s, though most eventually reclassed their collections to use LC Classification in an effort to increase standardization. The system was use in the Union library until the mid-1970s. According to a 2013 survey, only seven libraries were still actively cataloging using the Union Classification.

== Personal life ==
Pettee was deaf and wore hearing aids, which she would reportedly turn off when concentrating on a cataloging project. She adopted a girl named Mary Ellen whom she raised.

== Later life and death ==
After retiring from Union Theological Seminary, Pettee supervised the reclassification of the religious books at Yale University. She wrote Subject Headings: the History and Theory of the Alphabetical Subject Approach to Books in 1946. Throughout her career, she emphasized that "there is no infallable substitute for the good judgement of the cataloger".

She retired from her part time work at Yale in 1946, moving to a farm in Salisbury, Connecticut that was called "Mayflower Farm" where she gardened and entertained guests. Pettee was an active writer and researcher in her retirement and at age 85 she published a biography of one of her ancestors, The Reverend Jonathan Lee and His Eighteenth Century Salisbury Parish. She also wrote articles for a local newspaper. She died on May 30, 1967.

== Selected publications ==
- Pettee, Julia. Subject Headings: The History and Theory of the Alphabetic Subject Approach to Books. New York: H.W. Wilson Co, 1946.
- Pettee, Julia. List of Theological Subject Headings Compiled by Julia Pettee, Head Cataloguer, Union Theological Seminary, New York City. New York, 1924.
- Pettee, Julia. List of Churches: Official Forms of the Names for Denominational Bodies with Brief Descriptive and Historical Notes. New York. Union Theological Seminary. Library, 1948
- Pettee, Julia. Author Entry for Church Bodies and Religious Sects: Tentative Draft for Protestant Denominations. American Library Association, 1936.
- Pettee, Julia. The Rev. Jonathan Lee and His Eighteenth Century Salisbury Parish: The Early History of the Town of Salisbury, Connecticut. Salisbury, Conn: Salisbury Association, 1957.
