= Edmund Leavens Chandler =

Canadian politician

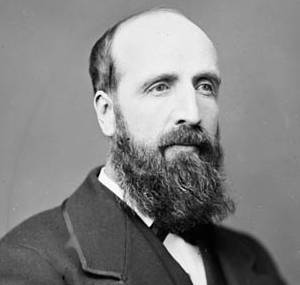

Member of the House of Commons of Canada for Brome
- In office 1879–1880

Personal details
- Born: 21 December 1829 Frelighsburg, Lower Canada
- Died: 21 August 1880 (aged 50) Brome, Quebec, Canada
- Party: Liberal
- Spouse: Amanda Jane Darling (m. 1860)
- Occupation: merchant, politician

Edmund Leavens Chandler (21 December 1829 – 21 August 1880) was a Canadian merchant and a political figure in Quebec. He represented Brome in the House of Commons of Canada from 1879 to 1880 as a Liberal member.

He was born in Frelighsburg, Missisquoi County, Lower Canada, the son of Horace Mitchell and Lydia Leavens. After completing his education, Chandler taught school for several years and then worked as a secretary for realty dealers in Lowell, Massachusetts for about five years. In 1855, he settled at Brome Corner (later Brome) in Canada East and entered business there as a general merchant with Henry Rogers. Chandler also served as secretary-treasurer for the Brome County council and chairman of Brome township's board of school commissioners. In 1860, he married Amanda Jane Darling. Chandler was mayor of Brome township and warden of Brome County from 1868 to 1872. He helped promote the development of the South-Eastern Railway, later bought by the Canadian Pacific Railway, and served as its secretary-treasurer. Chandler died in office at Brome Corner at the age of 50.
