= Nathaniel Pettes =

Canadian politician

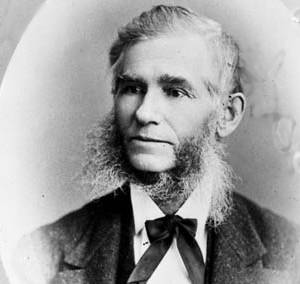
Nathaniel Pettes Source: Library and Archives Canada

Nathaniel Pettes (April 21, 1816 – October 20, 1889) was a merchant and political figure in Quebec. He represented Brome in the House of Commons of Canada from 1874 to 1878 as a Liberal member.

He was born in Brome Township, Lower Canada, the son of Charles Pettes and Desire West. In 1844, he married Narcissa Ferrand. Pettes was a general merchant in Brome. He was a school commissioner and secretary-treasurer for the municipal council. Pettes also served as warden for Brome County and was a director of the South Eastern Railway and the Canada Central Railway. Pettes died in Knowlton, Quebec at the age of 73.

The Pettes Memorial Library, the first free rural public library in Quebec, was built in 1893 by Pettes' wife Narcissa in his memory.

== Electoral record ==
1874 Canadian federal election: Brome
Party	Candidate	Votes
Liberal	Nathaniel Pettes	acclaimed
Source: Canadian Elections Database
