= Andrew Ross McMaster =

Canadian politician

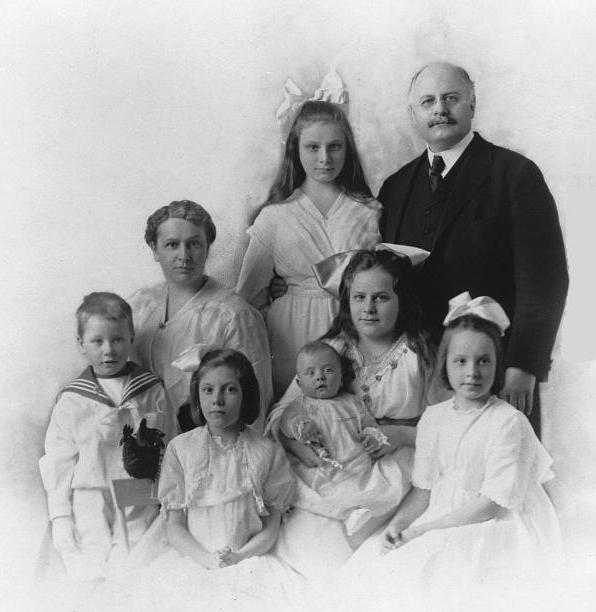
Andrew Ross McMaster and family, about 1910

Andrew Ross McMaster, KC (November 6, 1876 – April 27, 1937) was a Canadian politician. He became King's Counsel and was educated at the University of Edinburgh.

== Biography ==
He was born in Montreal to Captain John Andrew McMaster and his wife Amelia and educated at Montreal High School, Montreal Collegiate Institute and at McGill University and the University of Edinburgh. Graduating with a law degree, he was admitted to the Quebec bar in 1901 and was made King's Counsel in 1910.

McMaster practiced law in Montreal with the firm of Fleet, Falconer, Cook, Brodie, Magee, Papineau, Campbell, Couture, Kerry and Bruneau before becoming Crown Attorney for the district of Montreal.

=== Political career ===
Entering politics, McMaster was elected to the House of Commons of Canada in the 1917 federal election defeating Brigadier General Dennis Draper in the riding of Brome. The election was held as a result of the Conscription Crisis of 1917 and McMaster ran for the anti-conscription Laurier Liberals. He was re-elected in the 1921 federal election as a Liberal. He did not run for re-election in 1925.

Moving to provincial politics, McMaster was elected to the Legislative Assembly of Quebec as the Quebec Liberal Party MLA for Compton in a 1929 by-election shortly after he had been appointed Provincial Treasurer in the cabinet of Louis-Alexandre Taschereau. He succeeded Jacob Nicol as both Treasurer and as the MLA for Compton. McMaster presented one budget, in January 1930 before the Great Depression had made its impact. He resigned from cabinet in October 1930 and retired from politics at the 1931 provincial election.

In the 1936 provincial election McMaster broke with the Liberals and endorsed his son-in-law, Jonathan Robinson who was a candidate for the rival Union Nationale in the provincial electoral district of Brome. Robinson was elected and was served as Minister of Mines in the government of Maurice Duplessis in the 1940s.

1917 Canadian federal election: Brome
Party	Candidate	Votes
Opposition (Laurier Liberals)	Andrew Ross McMaster	1,926
Government (Unionist)	Dennis Colburn Draper	1,488

1921 Canadian federal election: Brome
Party	Candidate	Votes
Liberal	Andrew Ross McMaster	3,768
Conservative	Joseph Boulay	2,163
