= Knowlton, Quebec =

Village and former municipality in Quebec, Canada

Knowlton
- Village (unincorporated)
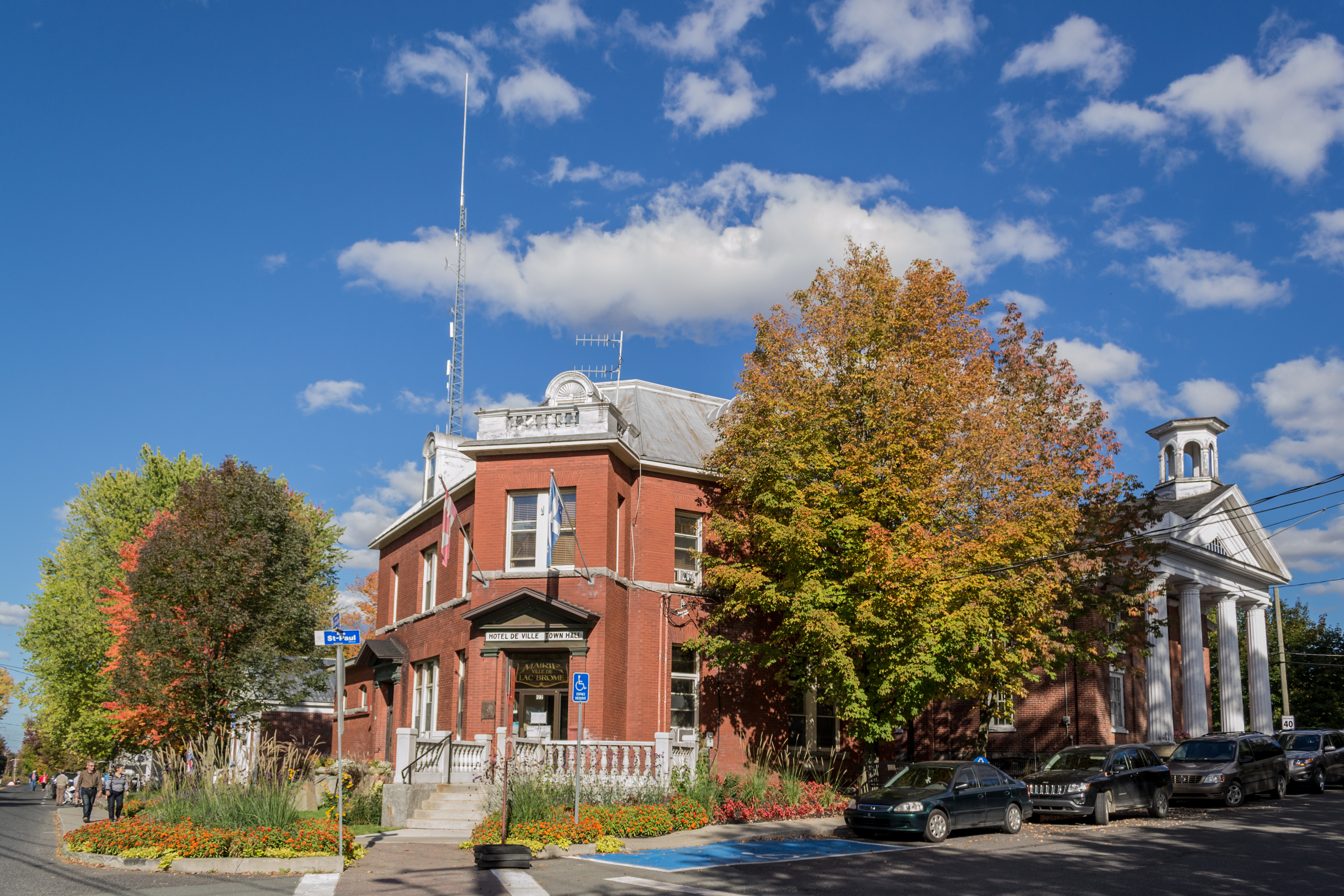
- Brome Lake's town hall located in Knowlton

- Location in southern Quebec
- Coordinates: 45°13′02″N 72°31′07″W
- Country: Canada
- Province: Quebec
- Region: Estrie
- Regional county municipality: Brome-Missisquoi
- Municipality: Brome Lake
- Post office established: 1851
- Incorporated: July 6, 1888
- Amalgamated: January 2, 1971
- Named for: Paul Holland Knowlton

Government
  - Mayor of Brome Lake: Lee Patterson
- Time zone: UTC−5 (EST)
  - Summer (DST): UTC−4 (EDT)
- Postal code: J0E 1V0
- Area code(s): 354, 450, 579
- Former name: Coldbrook

Knowlton is a village and former village municipality in the town of Brome Lake, in the Brome-Missisquoi Regional County Municipality of Estrie, Quebec, Canada. It was incorporated as a village municipality in 1888 and was amalgamated with Brome Township and the village of Foster in 1971 to form the present Town of Brome Lake.

The village developed around industrial and commercial buildings established by Paul Holland Knowlton in the 1830s. It became the county seat of Brome County in 1855 and later served as a regional administrative and judicial centre. The institutional centre around Lakeside Road, Saint-Paul Street and Mill Pond has been a municipally designated heritage site since 1993.

== Toponymy ==
The village was first known as Coldbrook, after the stream around which the settlement developed. A post office opened in 1851 under the name Knowlton, and the name was subsequently applied to the village. It commemorates Paul Holland Knowlton (1787–1863), a businessman, militia officer and politician who moved from his farm on Brome Lake to the site of the present village in 1834.

== History ==
Matthew Morehouse of Massachusetts and John Capel of Vermont were among the first settlers in the immediate area during the early 19th century. Paul Holland Knowlton had settled elsewhere in Brome Township by 1815, where he farmed and operated a store and distillery. In 1834 he moved to a site beside a stream flowing toward Brome Lake. He acquired water rights and built a sawmill, followed by a house, smithy, pearlashery, store and grist mill. These businesses formed the nucleus of Coldbrook, later Knowlton.

The post office opened in 1851. By then the village also had Blinn's Inn, built in 1849 and later known as Auberge Knowlton. In 1854 the Old Academy was built as the village's first public school. Knowlton became the county seat of Brome County in 1855. The former Brome County courthouse and registry office was built in 1859 and housed the court, land registry and county corporation.

The Advertiser and Eastern Townships Sentinel began publication in Knowlton in 1856 under Lucius Seth Huntington, with financial and political support from Paul Holland Knowlton. During the second half of the 19th century, Knowlton became the administrative, judicial and postal centre of the surrounding county. By 1867, country houses owned by affluent Montreal residents were already present in the village. Railway service arrived in the 1870s and increased the number of summer visitors; Blinn's Inn was enlarged and renamed the Railroad House during this period.

During the 1870s, Knowlton became a receiving point for British children sent to Canada through assisted-emigration programs. A distributing home assciated with the Liverpool Sheltering Home operated in the village, and federal records include passenger lists for children sent to Knowlton. The Lac-Brome Museum estimates that almost 5,000 Home Children passed through the Knowlton home before it closed in 1915.

Knowlton became a separate village municipality on July 6, 1888. The Pettes Memorial Library was built in 1893 in memory of former Brome MP Nathaniel Pettes and opened the following year. The Brome County Historical Society was founded in 1897 and incorporated in 1898. In 1903 the society took over the Old Academy, which became the Paul Holland Knowlton Memorial and has since been used as a museum.

A federal post office was built in 1908 and completed in 1909. The building became the town hall of Brome Lake in 1973 after the post office moved elsewhere. St. Paul's Anglican Church, built in 1941, replaced an earlier church destroyed by fire that year.

On January 2, 1971, Knowlton was amalgamated with the Municipality of the Township of Brome and the Village of Foster to form the Town of Brome Lake. Knowlton remains an officially recognized village and is classified by the Canadian Geographical Names Database as an unincorporated place.

== Geography ==
Knowlton occupies a separate part of the Brome Lake basin, between the Tibbits ridge and the western slopes of the Green Mountains. Coldbrook Creek runs through the village toward Brome Lake. The older village centre developed along the creek and around Mill Pond, where the dam and several early mills were built.

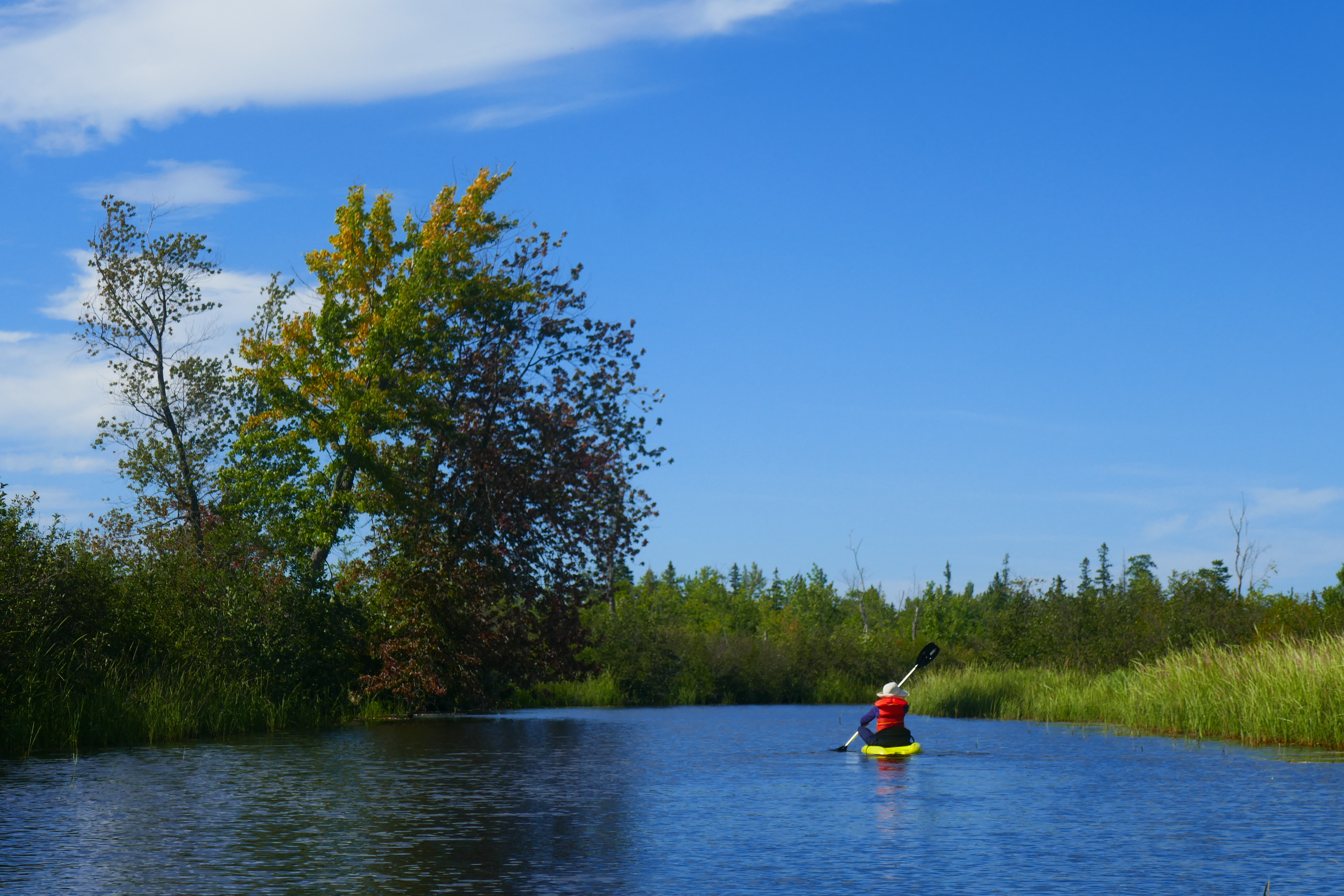
Brome Lake

The broader Brome Lake basin slopes gradually toward the lake and is makde up largely of sedimentary terrain. Wetlands occur in the lower parts of the basin, including marshland along Coldbrook creek between Knowlton and Brome Lake. Brome Lake itself covers about 15 km² and is the source of the Yamaska River.

The village is crossed by Route 104 and Route 243. The two roads meet in central Knowlton, where Route 104 ends.

== Built heritage ==
The post office, Brome County courthouse and an earlier St. Paul's Church, photographed between about 1905 and 1920

The institutional centre of Knowlton was designated a municipal heritage site in 1993. It contains eight buildings around Lakeside Road, Saint-Paul Street and Mill Pond, including the Old Academy, the former Brome County courthouse and registry office, the former fire station, the former post office and St. Paul's Anglican Church.

The Old Academy dates from 1854. A second storey was added in 1867, and the building became Knowlton Academy during the 1880s. After a larger school opened on Victoria Street, the original academy was transferred to the Brome County Historical Society in 1903. The courthouse was built in 1859 and enlarged in 1885. Court sessions ended there in 1950, and the land registry moved out in 1992; the building is now used by the historical society for its archives.

Pettes Memorial Library was built in 1893 and opened in 1894. The Quebec heritage register identifies it as the first free public library established in rural Quebec. The building remains in use as a public library. Auberge Knowlton, built as Blinn's Inn in 1849, is also listed in the provincial heritage inventory. The heritage register describes it as the oldest hotel establishment still operating in the Eastern Townships.

== Demographics ==
Historical Census Data – Knowlton, Quebec
Year	Pop.	±%
1901	760	—
1911	865	+13.8%
1921	841	−2.8%
1931	990	+17.7%
1941	972	−1.8%
1951	1,094	+12.6%
1961	1,396	+27.6%
1966	1,486	+6.4%
Sources: Town of Brome Lake historical records for 1901–1961; 1966 Census of Canada for 1966.

Knowlton has not been a separate census subdivision since the 1971 amalgamation. Statistics Canada's 2021 Standard Geographical Classification lists Knowlton as a place name within the Lac-Brome census subdivision; current census population figures are published for Lac-Brome exclusively.

== Education ==
Knowlton has two elementary schools. École Saint-Édouard is a French-language elementary school, while Knowlton Academy is an English-language school operated by the Eastern Townships School Board. Knowlton Academy serves kindergarten through Grade 6 and draws students from several nearby communities. Public secondary students are served by Massey-Vanier High School in Cowansville.

== Culture ==
The Brome County Historical Society operates the Lac-Brome Museum in Knowlton. The society was founded in 1897, and its museum complex includes the Old Academy, courthouse, fire hall and other buildings in the village's institutional core.

Professional English-language summer theatre operated in Knowlton from 1935 to 1956 at the Brae Manor Playhouse. Théâtre de Lac-Brome was founded in 1988 and later broadened its programming to include both English- and French-language performances.

Parts of the 1969 film My Side of the Mountain were filmed in Knowlton and Toronto in 1967. Author Louise Penny has said that the fictional village of Three Pines in her Chief Inspector Gamache novels was inspired by several communities in the Eastern Townships, including Knowlton, Sutton, North Hatley and Georgeville.

== Transportation ==
Routes 104 and 243 meet in Knowlton, with Route 104 terminating at their junction. Railway service reached the village during the 1870s and brought more summer visitors. Blinn's Inn was enlarged and renamed the Railroad House during this period.

== See also ==
- Brome Lake, Quebec
- Brome County, Quebec
- Paul Holland Knowlton
- List of anglophone communities in Quebec
