= Canadian electoral calendar =

This is a list of Canadian electoral calendars.

- 1990s: 1990
- 1991
- 1992
- 1993
- 1994
- 1995
- 1996
- 1997
- 1998
- 1999

- 2000s: 2000
- 2001
- 2002
- 2003
- 2004
- 2005
- 2006
- 2007
- 2008
- 2009

- 2010s: 2010
- 2011
- 2012
- 2013
- 2014
- 2015
- 2016
- 2017
- 2018
- 2019

- 2020s: 2020
- 2021
- 2022
- 2023
- 2024
- 2025
- 2026

== See also ==
- List of Canadian incumbents by year
- Timeline of Canadian elections
- List of years in Canada
