= List of elections in 1995 =

The following elections occurred in the year 1995.

== Africa ==
- 1995 Algerian presidential election
- 1995 Beninese parliamentary election
- 1995 Cape Verdean parliamentary election
- 1995 Egyptian parliamentary election
- 1995 Ethiopian general election
- 1995 Gabonese constitutional referendum
- 1995 Guinean legislative election
- 1995 Ivorian parliamentary election
- 1995 Ivorian presidential election
- 1995 Malagasy constitutional referendum
- 1995 Mauritian general election
- 1995 Moroccan constitutional referendum
- 1995 Nigerien parliamentary election
- 1995–96 South African municipal elections
- 1995 Tanzanian general election
- 1995 Zimbabwean parliamentary election

== Asia ==
- 1995 Armenian constitutional referendum
- 1995–1996 Azerbaijani parliamentary election
- 1995 Egyptian parliamentary election
- 1995 Georgian parliamentary election
- 1995 Georgian presidential election
- 1995 Kazakhstani legislative election
- 1995 Kazakh constitutional referendum
- 1995 Kyrgyz presidential election
- 1995 Malaysian general election
- 1995 Philippine House of Representatives elections
- 1995 Philippine Senate election
- 1995 Philippine general election
- 1995 Republic of China legislative election
- 1995 Iraqi presidential referendum
- 1995 Japanese House of Councillors election
- 1995 Malaysian general election
- 1995 Russian legislative election
- 1995 South Korean local elections
- 1995 Tajik parliamentary election
- 1995 Thai general election
- 1995 Turkish general election
- 1994-95 Uzbek parliamentary election

=== India ===
- 1995 Bihar Legislative Assembly election
- 1995 Maharashtra state assembly elections

== Europe ==
- 1995 Ålandic legislative election
- 1995 Andorran local elections
- 1995–96 Azerbaijani parliamentary election
- 1995 Belarusian parliamentary election
- 1995 Belarusian referendum
- 1995 Belgian federal election
- 1995 Belgian regional elections
- 1995 Croatian parliamentary election
- 1995 Estonian parliamentary election
- 1995 European Parliament election in Sweden
- 1995 Finnish parliamentary election
- 1995 French municipal elections
- 1995 Georgian parliamentary election
- 1995 Georgian presidential election
- 1995 Greek presidential election
- 1995 Hungarian presidential election
- 1995 Icelandic parliamentary election
- 1995 Italian local elections
- 1995 Kazakh legislative election
- 1995 Latvian parliamentary election
- 1995 Liechtenstein local elections
- 1995 Moldovan local elections
- 1995 Northern Cyprus presidential election
- 1995 North Rhine-Westphalia state election
- 1995 Norwegian local elections
- 1995 Polish presidential election
- 1995 Portuguese legislative election
- 1995 Moldovan local elections
- 1995 Transnistrian constitutional referendum
- 1995 Russian legislative election
- 1995 Austrian legislative election
- 1995 Swiss federal election
- 1995 Swiss referendums

=== European Parliament ===
- 1995 European Parliament election in Sweden

=== France ===
- 1995 French municipal elections
- 1995 French presidential election

=== Italy ===
- 1995 Italian regional elections

=== Spain ===
- 1995 Catalan parliamentary election
- 1995 Valencian regional election
- 1995 Aragonese regional election
- 1995 Spanish local elections

=== United Kingdom ===
- 1995 Conservative Party leadership election
- 1995 Islwyn by-election
- 1995 Littleborough and Saddleworth by-election
- 1995 United Kingdom local elections
- 1995 North Down by-election
- 1995 Perth and Kinross by-election
- 1995 Scottish local elections
- March 1995 Ulster Unionist Party leadership election
- September 1995 Ulster Unionist Party leadership election

==== United Kingdom local ====
- 1995 United Kingdom local elections

===== English local =====
- 1995 Bristol City Council election
- 1995 Hinckley and Bosworth Council election
- 1995 Manchester Council election
- 1995 Trafford Council election
- 1995 Wolverhampton Council election

===== Scottish local =====
- 1995 Highland Council election

== North America ==
=== Canada ===
- 1995 Edmonton municipal election
- 1995 Manitoba general election
- 1995 Manitoba municipal elections
- 1995 New Brunswick general election
- 1995 New Democratic Party leadership election
- 1995 Northwest Territories general election
- 1995 Nunavut capital plebiscite
- 1995 Ontario general election
- 1995 Progressive Conservative Party of New Brunswick leadership election
- 1995 Quebec independence referendum
- 1995 Saskatchewan general election
- 1995 Winnipeg municipal election

=== Caribbean ===
- 1995 Dominican general election
- 1995 Grenadian general election
- 1995 Haitian general election
- 1995 Saint Kitts and Nevis general election
- 1995 Trinidad and Tobago general election
- 1995 Turks and Caicos Islands general election

=== United States ===
- 1995 United States elections

==== United States mayoral ====
- 1995 Baltimore mayoral election
- 1995 Burlington, Vermont mayoral election
- 1995 Chicago mayoral election
- 1995 Colorado Springs mayoral election
- 1995 Dallas mayoral election
- 1995 Denver mayoral election
- 1995 Durham mayoral election
- 1995 Evansville, Indiana, mayoral election
- 1995 Fort Wayne mayoral election
- 1995 Green Bay mayoral election
- 1995 Hartford mayoral election
- 1995 Houston mayoral election
- 1995 Indianapolis mayoral election
- 1995 Jacksonville mayoral election
- 1995 Knoxville mayoral election
- 1995 Las Vegas mayoral election
- 1995 Manchester, New Hampshire, mayoral election
- 1995 Philadelphia mayoral election
- 1995 Raleigh mayoral election
- 1995 San Francisco mayoral election
- 1995 South Bend mayoral election
- 1995 Springfield, Massachusetts mayoral election
- 1995 Tampa mayoral election
- 1995 Tucson mayoral election
- 1995 Worcester, Massachusetts mayoral election

==== United States lieutenant gubernatorial ====
- 1995 Louisiana lieutenant gubernatorial election

==== United States gubernatorial ====
- 1995 Kentucky gubernatorial election
- 1995 Louisiana gubernatorial election
- 1995 Mississippi gubernatorial election
- 1995 United States gubernatorial elections

==== United States House of Representatives ====
- 1995 United States House of Representatives elections
- 1995 Illinois's 2nd congressional district special election

== Oceania ==
- 1995 Marshallese general election
- 1995 Micronesian general election
- 1995 Nauruan parliamentary election
- 1995 Vanuatuan general election

=== Australia ===
- 1995 Australian Capital Territory election
- 1995 Canberra by-election
- 1995 New South Wales referendums
- 1995 New South Wales state election
- 1995 Queensland state election
- 1995 Wentworth by-election

=== New Zealand ===
- 1995 New Zealand firefighter referendum

== South America ==
- 1995 Guatemalan general election
- 1995 Argentine general election
- 1995 Peruvian general election
