= 2005 Canadian electoral calendar =

2005 elections in Canada

This is a list of notable elections in Canada in 2005. Included are provincial, municipal and federal elections, by-elections on any level, referendums and party leadership races at any level.

== May ==
- 17: British Columbia general election
- 17: British Columbia electoral reform referendum
- 24: By-elections to the 38th Canadian Parliament

== September ==
- 23-25: New Brunswick New Democratic Party leadership election
- 27: Newfoundland and Labrador municipal elections

== November ==
- 6: Bedford municipal election
- 6: Bromont municipal election
- 6: Cowansville municipal election
- 6: Magog municipal election
- 13: Parti Québécois leadership election
- 18-19: Alberta Alliance Party leadership election
- 19: Vancouver municipal election
- 28: Prince Edward Island electoral reform referendum

== See also ==
- Municipal elections in Canada
- Elections in Canada
