= 2001 Canadian electoral calendar =

2001 elections in Canada

This is list of notable elections in Canada in 2001. Included are provincial, municipal and federal elections, by-elections on any level, referendums and party leadership races at any level.

== March ==
- 12: 2001 Alberta general election

== May ==
- 14: New Brunswick municipal elections
- 14: 2001 New Brunswick video lottery terminal referendum
- 16: 2001 British Columbia provincial election

== October ==
- 15: 2001 Alberta municipal elections

== November ==
- 3: 2001 Green Party of Ontario leadership election
- 4: 2001 Quebec municipal elections

== See also ==
- Municipal elections in Canada
- Elections in Canada
