= 1995 Canadian electoral calendar =

List of elections in Canada in 1995

1995 elections in Canada

This is list of elections in Canada in 1995. Included are provincial, municipal and federal elections, by-elections on any level, referendums and party leadership races at any level.

== February ==
- February 13: Federal by-elections in Ottawa—Vanier, Brome—Missisquoi and Saint-Henri—Westmount

== April ==
- April 20: Provincial by-election in Calgary-McCall, Alberta
- April 25: 1995 Manitoba general election
- April 29: 1995 Progressive Conservative leadership election

== May ==
- May 3: Provincial by-election in Abbotsford, British Columbia
- May 8: New Brunswick municipal elections
- May 13: 1995 Progressive Conservative Party of New Brunswick leadership election

== June ==
- June 8: 1995 Ontario general election
- June 21: 1995 Saskatchewan general election
- June 27: Provincial by-election in Grand Falls, Newfoundland

== September ==
- September 11: 1995 New Brunswick general election

== October ==
- October 10:
  - Provincial by-election in Cape Breton West, Nova Scotia
  - Provincial by-election in Gander, Newfoundland
- October 12–15: 1995 New Democratic Party leadership election
- October 16:
  - 1995 Alberta municipal elections
  - 1995 Northwest Territories general election
- October 25: 1995 Manitoba municipal elections
- October 30: 1995 Quebec referendum

== See also ==
- Municipal elections in Canada
- Elections in Canada
