= 2002 Canadian electoral calendar =

2002 elections in Canada

This is list of notable elections in Canada in 2002. Included are provincial, municipal and federal elections, by-elections on any level, referendums and party leadership races at any level.

== March ==
- 23: Progressive Conservative Party of Ontario leadership election

== April ==
- 15: Quebec provincial by-elections

== May ==
- 15: British Columbia aboriginal treaty referendum

== June ==
- 17: Quebec provincial by-elections

== October ==
- 23: Manitoba municipal election
- 23: Winnipeg municipal election

== November ==
- 3: Bromont municipal election
- 3: Cowansville municipal election
- 3: Quebec municipal elections
- 4: Yukon general election

== December ==
- 1: Magog municipal election

== See also ==
- Municipal elections in Canada
- Elections in Canada
