= 2016 Canadian electoral calendar =

2016 elections in Canada

This is a list of elections in Canada in 2016. Included are provincial, municipal and federal elections, by-elections on any level, referendums and party leadership races at any level.

== January ==
- January 9: Coast Mountains School District, British Columbia by-election.
- January 11: Pincher Creek, Alberta municipal by-election.
- January 13: Norfolk Treherne, Manitoba municipal by-election for Ward 1 councillor.
- January 16:
  - Arrow Lakes School District, British Columbia by-election.
  - Montrose, British Columbia municipal by-election
- January 18: Brooks, Alberta mayoral and municipal by-election.
- January 23: Halifax, Nova Scotia municipal by-election for District 6 on Halifax Regional Council.
- January 25:
  - Toronto District School Board trustee by-election in Scarborough—Rouge River.
  - Pickering, Ontario municipal by-election for Ward 1 councillor.
- January 31: Granby, Quebec municipal by-election for District 6.

== February ==
- February 1:
  - Sault Ste. Marie, Ontario municipal by-election for Ward 2 councillor.
  - Barrie, Ontario municipal by-election for Ward 7 councillor.
  - Badger, Newfoundland and Labrador municipal by-election.
  - High Prairie, Alberta municipal by-election.
- February 2: Provincial by-elections in the ridings of Vancouver-Mount Pleasant and Coquitlam-Burke Mountain, British Columbia.
- February 8:
  - Netsilik, Nunavut territorial by-election.
  - Wood Buffalo, Alberta municipal by-election in Ward 2
- February 11:
  - Irricana, Alberta municipal by-election.
  - Provincial by-election in Whitby—Oshawa, Ontario.
- February 14: Longueuil, Quebec municipal by-election for District 8.
- February 20:
  - Arrow Lakes School District, British Columbia by-election.
  - Zeballos, British Columbia municipal by-election
- February 21:
  - Mayoral by-election in Victoriaville, Quebec
  - Municipal by-election in Sainte-Anne-de-Bellevue, Quebec
  - Municipal by-election in Saint-Hyacinthe, Quebec in District 7.
- February 22: Edmonton Ward 12 municipal by-election to Edmonton City Council.
- February 23: St. John's, Newfoundland and Labrador Ward 4 municipal by-election
- February 24: Saskatoon Public Schools trustee by-election in Ward 9.
- February 27:
  - 2016 Nova Scotia New Democratic Party leadership election
  - Langley, British Columbia (city) municipal by-election.
- February 28:
  - Gaspé, Quebec municipal by-election in Ward 4.
  - Gatineau, Quebec municipal by-election in Lac-Beauchamp District.
  - Le Rocher-Percé Regional County Municipality prefect by-election.
- February 29: County of Vermilion River, Alberta municipal election in Division 4.

== March ==
- March 6:
  - Lorraine, Quebec mayoral by-election and municipal by-elections for districts 3 and 6.
  - Saint-Philippe, Quebec District 1 by-election
- March 8: Grand Falls-Windsor, Newfoundland and Labrador municipal by-election.
- March 10: Rural Municipality of Morris, Manitoba municipal by-election.
- March 20:
  - Saint-Augustin-de-Desmaures, Quebec District 4 by-election
  - Sainte-Brigitte-de-Laval, Quebec District 3 by-election
- March 21:
  - Hamilton, Ontario municipal by-election for Ward 7 on Hamilton, Ontario City Council.
  - Slave Lake, Alberta municipal by-election.

== April ==
- April 4: 2016 Saskatchewan general election
- April 9:
  - Warfield, British Columbia municipal by-election
  - Pouce Coupe, British Columbia mayoral by-election
- April 10: Côte-Saint-Luc, Quebec municipal by-election
- April 11:
  - Oakville, Ontario municipal by-election in Ward 2.
  - Chicoutimi provincial by-election.
- April 17:
  - Carignan, Quebec District 4 by-election.
  - Victoriaville, Quebec District 9 by-election.
  - Chandler, Quebec East Sector by-election.
- April 19: 2016 Manitoba general election
- April 24:
  - Montreal North borough mayoral by-election.
  - Saint-Hippolyte, Quebec District 4 by-election
- April 25: Seguin, Ontario Ward 4 municipal by-election.

== May ==
- May 1: Sainte-Adèle, Quebec Mayoral and municipal by-elections
- May 2:
  - Thorsby, Alberta municipal by-election.
  - County of Grande Prairie No. 1, Alberta municipal by-election in Division 8.
- May 9:
  - 2016 New Brunswick municipal elections
  - Nunavut municipal land referendums
- May 14: Stikine School District by-election.
- May 15:
  - Baie-Comeau, Quebec District 5 by-election.
  - Val-d'Or, Quebec District 2 by-election.
- May 18: Brandon, Manitoba municipal by-election in Riverview Ward
- May 22:
  - Brownsburg-Chatham, Quebec mayoral and municipal by-elections.
  - Calgary-Greenway, Alberta provincial by-election.
- May 28:
  - Pictou County, Nova Scotia amalgamation plebiscite. and District 3 by-election.
  - Grand Forks, British Columbia council by-election.

== June to August ==
- June 11:
  - Winnipeg, Manitoba school trustee by-elections.
  - New Westminster School District by-election.
- June 12: Municipal by-election in District 3, Rigaud, Quebec.
- June 16: Municipal by-election in North Ward, Whitby, Ontario.
- June 18: Greenwood, British Columbia council by-election.
- June 19:
  - Mayoral by-election and municipal by-election in North Ward, Delson, Quebec.
  - Municipal by-election in District 5, Mount Royal, Quebec.
  - Municipal by-election in District 1, Mont-Joli, Quebec.
  - Mayoral by-election in Donnacona, Quebec.
  - Municipal by-election in District 3, Boucherville, Quebec.
  - Mayoral by-election in Beaupré, Quebec.
- June 20: Toronto District School Board by-election in Toronto Centre—Rosedale.
- June 21: Sundre, Alberta municipal by-election.
- June 25: Cache Creek, British Columbia council by-election.
- July 18: Hinton, Alberta municipal by-election
- July 20: Conseil scolaire francophone de la Colombie-Britannique by-election.
- July 25:
  - Toronto City Council by-election in Ward 2.
  - Toronto District School Board by-elections in York Centre and Etobicoke North.
- July 30: Municipal elections in Saskatchewan's resort villages.
- August 18: Temagami, Ontario municipal by-election.
- August 21: Saint-Félicien, Quebec municipal by-election in District 3.
- August 22: Black Diamond, Alberta mayoral and municipal by-elections.
- August 29: West Lincoln, Ontario municipal by-election in Ward 3.
- August 30: Provincial by-election in Halifax Needham, Nova Scotia.

== September to October ==
- September 1: Provincial by-election in Scarborough—Rouge River, Ontario.
- September 2: Brock, Ontario municipal by-election in Ward 2.
- September 10: Lytton, British Columbia municipal by-election.
- September 17: Ashcroft, British Columbia municipal by-election.
- September 18: Oka, Quebec municipal by-election in District 2.
- September 19: Greater St. Albert Catholic Schools trustee by-election.
- September 25: Saint-Lazare, Quebec municipal by-election in District 4.
- October 1: Regional District of Fraser-Fort George, British Columbia municipal by-election.
- October 2: Yukon Francophone School Board trustee election.
- October 7: 2016 Parti Québécois leadership election
- October 8: Central Coast Regional District, British Columbia municipal by-election.
- October 14: Tecumseh, Ontario municipal by-election in Ward 2
- October 15: 2016 Nova Scotia municipal elections
- October 17:
  - Newmarket, Ontario municipal by-election in Ward 5
  - Provincial by-election in Summerside-Wilmot, Prince Edward Island
  - High River, Alberta municipal by-election.
- October 22
  - 2016 Progressive Conservative Party of New Brunswick leadership election
  - Parksville, British Columbia municipal by-election.
  - Zeballos, British Columbia municipal by-election.
  - Port Hardy, British Columbia municipal by-election.
- October 23:
  - Wentworth, Quebec municipal by-election in Seat #3.
  - McMasterville, Quebec municipal by-election in District 6.
- October 24: Federal by-election in Medicine Hat—Cardston—Warner, Alberta.
- October 26: 2016 Saskatchewan municipal elections
- October 29: Castlegar, British Columbia municipal by-election.
- October 30: Windsor, Quebec District 1 municipal by-election.

== November to December ==
- November 5:
  - School District 53 Okanagan Similkameen, British Columbia by-election.
  - Winnipeg School Division Ward 7 trustee by-election.
- November 6:
  - Cantley, Quebec de la Rive district municipal by-election.
  - Prévost, Quebec District 3 municipal by-election.
- October 26-November 7: 2016 Prince Edward Island electoral reform referendum
- November 7: 2016 Yukon general election
- November 12: Fraser Lake, British Columbia municipal by-election.
- November 14:
  - Municipal by-elections in New Brunswick: Baker Brook, Clair, Drummond, Maisonnette, Meductic (councillor, at-large); Miramichi (mayor and councillor at-large); Moncton (Ward 4 councillor); Saint-André (Ward 5 councillor)
  - Haut-Madawaska, New Brunswick rural community amalgamation plebiscite.
- November 17: Provincial by-elections in Ottawa—Vanier and Niagara West—Glanbrook, Ontario.
- November 19:
  - West Vancouver, British Columbia municipal by-election
  - Houston, British Columbia municipal by-election
  - Armstrong, British Columbia municipal by-election
  - Lions Bay, British Columbia municipal by-election and loan authorization bylaw referendum
- November 20:
  - Nicolet, Quebec mayoral and district 5 municipal by-election.
  - Outremont, Quebec places of worship ban on Bernard Avenue referendum.
- December 3: Midway, British Columbia municipal by-election
- December 5: Provincial by-elections in Marie-Victorin, Saint-Jérôme, Arthabaska and Verdun
- December 10:
  - Burns Lake, British Columbia municipal by-election
  - Fort St. James, British Columbia municipal by-election
- December 11: Sainte-Anne-des-Monts, Quebec mayoral by-election
- December 18: Saint-Félix-de-Valois, Quebec District 2 municipal by-election
