= Nakusp (disambiguation) =

Nakusp is a village in British Columbia, Canada. Nakusp may also refer to:

- Nakusp Airport (CAQ5), an airport near Naskup, BC, Canada
- Nakusp Secondary School, a high school in the Arrow Lakes school district (district #10) of BC, Canada
- Nakusp Elementary School, a primary school in the Arrow Lakes school district (district #10) of BC, Canada
- Nakusp and Slocan Railway, a former railway in the Kooetenays region of British Columbia, Canada
- Nakusp (sternwheeler) (1895–1897), a steamboat that operated on the Arrow Lakes of BC, Canada
- Nakusp Music Fest, an annual music festival held in Nakusp, British Columbia
