= Burton Elementary School =

Burton Elementary School may refer to:

- Burton Elementary School (British Columbia), Burton, British Columbia, Canada
- Burton Elementary School, in Anglophone West School District in Burton, New Brunswick, Canada
