= 2012 Canadian electoral calendar =

2012 elections in Canada

This is a list of elections in Canada in 2012. Included are provincial, municipal and federal elections, by-elections on any level, referendums and party leadership races at any level.

== January to April ==
- January 16 - North Glengarry, Ontario mayoral by-election
- February 27
  - 2012 Hinton, Alberta municipal by-election
  - Yellowhead County, Alberta municipal by-election, 2012
- March 19 - Federal by-election in Toronto—Danforth
- March 24 - 2012 New Democratic Party leadership election
- March 26 - Rocky View County, Alberta municipal by-election, 2012
- April 23
  - 2012 Alberta general election
  - 2012 Alberta Senate nominee election

== May to August ==
- May 1 - 2012 Stony Plain municipal by-election
- May 14 - 2012 New Brunswick municipal elections
- June 11 - Argenteuil and LaFontaine by-elections
- June 25 - Rothesay by-election
- July 28 - 2012 Saskatchewan municipal elections

== September to December ==
- September 4
  - Fort Whyte by-election
  - 2012 Quebec general election
- September 6 - Kitchener—Waterloo and Vaughan by-elections
- October 15
  - Iqaluit municipal election, 2012
  - Northwest Territories municipal elections, 2012 (taxed communities)
- October 18 - Yukon municipal elections, 2012
- October 20 - 2012 Nova Scotia municipal elections
- October 24 - 2012 Saskatchewan municipal elections
- October 27 - 2012 New Brunswick Liberal Association leadership election
- November 3 - 2012 Green Party of Prince Edward Island leadership election
- November 5 - 2012 Prince Edward Island municipal elections, excluding Charlottetown, Cornwall, Stratford and Summerside
- November 11 - Municipal by-election in Rivière-des-Prairies, Montreal
- November 26 - Federal by-elections in Calgary Centre, Durham, and Victoria
- December 3 - Nunavut municipal elections, 2012 (hamlets)
- December 10 - Northwest Territories municipal elections, 2012 (hamlets)

== See also ==
- Municipal elections in Canada
- Elections in Canada
