= 2008 Canadian electoral calendar =

2008 elections in Canada

This is a list of elections in Canada in 2008. Included are provincial, municipal and federal elections, by-elections on any level, referendums and party leadership races at any level.

== March ==
- 3 March: 2008 Alberta general election
- 17 March: 2008 Canadian federal by-elections

== May ==
- 12 May: 2008 New Brunswick municipal elections
- 12 May: 2008 Quebec provincial by-elections

== June ==
- 25 June: Saskatchewan provincial by-election in Cumberland

== August ==
- 27 August: Newfoundland and Labrador provincial by-elections in Baie Verte-Springdale and Cape St. Francis

== September ==
- 29 September: Quebec provincial by-election in Jean-Talon

== October ==
- 14 October: 2008 Canadian federal election
- 18 October: 2008 Progressive Conservative Party of New Brunswick leadership election
- 18 October: 2008 Nova Scotia municipal elections
- 22 October: 2008 Saskatchewan municipal elections
- 26 October: Municipal by-election in Orée-du-Parc District, Gatineau, Quebec.
- 27 October: 2008 Nunavut general election
- 29 October: British Columbia provincial by-elections in Vancouver-Burrard and Vancouver-Fairview

== November ==
- 3 November: provincial by-election in New Maryland-Sunbury West, New Brunswick
- 15 November: 2008 British Columbia municipal elections

== December ==
- 1 December: Nunavut municipal elections, 2008 (hamlets)
- 8 December: 2008 Quebec general election
- 8 December: Northwest Territories municipal elections, 2008 (hamlets)

== See also ==
- Municipal elections in Canada
- Elections in Canada
