= 2004 Canadian electoral calendar =

2004 elections in Canada

This is a list of elections in Canada that were held in 2004. Included are municipal, provincial and federal elections, by-elections on any level, referendums and party leadership races at any level.

== January ==
- January 23 - 2004 Progressive Conservative Party of Ontario leadership election

== February ==
- February 16 - 2004 Nunavut general election

== March ==
- March 20 - 2004 Conservative Party of Canada leadership election
- March 27 - 2004 Alberta Liberal Party leadership election

== May ==
- May 10 - 2004 New Brunswick municipal elections

== June ==
- June 28 - 2004 Canadian federal election

== September ==
- September 20 - 2004 Quebec provincial by-elections

== October ==
- October 16 - 2004 Nova Scotia municipal elections
  - 2004 Halifax municipal election
  - 2004 Nova Scotia Sunday shopping plebiscite
- October 18 - 2004 Alberta municipal elections
  - 2004 Calgary municipal election
  - 2004 Edmonton municipal election

== November ==
- November 22 -
  - 2004 Alberta general election
  - 2004 Alberta Senate nominee election

== See also ==
- Canadian electoral calendar
