= 1998 Canadian electoral calendar =

1998 elections in Canada

This is list of elections in Canada in 1998. Included are provincial, municipal and federal elections, by-elections on any level, referendums and party leadership races at any level.

== May ==
- 11: New Brunswick municipal elections

== See also ==
- Municipal elections in Canada
- Elections in Canada
