= 2020 Canadian electoral calendar =

2020 elections in Canada

This is a list of elections in Canada scheduled to be held in 2020. Included are municipal, provincial and federal elections, by-elections on any level, referendums and party leadership races at any level. In bold are provincewide or federal elections (including provincewide municipal elections) and party leadership races.

== January through March ==
- January 13: Municipal by-election in Wabamun, Alberta (cancelled due to acclamation)
- January 18: Sea to Sky School District by-election
- January 20: Municipal by-election in Olds, Alberta
- January 25: Kootenay-Columbia School District by-election
- January 27:
  - Municipal by-election in Sioux Lookout, Ontario
  - Municipal by-election in Fox Creek, Alberta
- February 3: Municipal by-election in Murray Harbour, Prince Edward Island (cancelled due to acclamation)
- February 7: Municipal by-election in Division 2, Municipal District of Lesser Slave River, Alberta
- February 10: Mayoral by-election in Hall Beach, Nunavut
- February 15:
  - Municipal by-election in Squamish-Lillooet Regional District, British Columbia
  - Shishalh Nation Chief and Council election
- February 22: Municipal by-election in Tahsis, British Columbia
- February 23: Municipal by-election in Lac-Blouin/Centre-ville District, Val-d'Or, Quebec
- February 24: Municipal by-election in Ward 3, Barrie, Ontario
- February 27: Provincial by-elections in Ottawa—Vanier and Orléans, Ontario
- February 29: Municipal by-elections in Zeballos and Bulkley-Nechako Regional District, British Columbia
- March 1: Municipal by-election in District 3, Mille-Isles, Quebec
- March 7:
  - Municipal elections in the West Hants Regional Municipality, Nova Scotia.
  - **Ontario Liberal Party leadership election**
- March 10: Provincial by-elections in Cape Breton Centre and Truro-Bible Hill-Millbrook-Salmon River, Nova Scotia
- March 15: Municipal by-election in Saint-Léonard-Est District, Montreal (postponed until 2021 due to the COVID-19 pandemic in Montreal)
- March 21: Winnipeg School Division School Trustee Elections (Wards 3 & 4) (cancelled due to the COVID-19 pandemic in Manitoba)
- March 23: Municipal by-election in Ward 7, Cambridge, Ontario (postponed due to the COVID-19 pandemic in Ontario)
- March 25: Municipal by-election in Carrot River, Saskatchewan (postponed due to the COVID-19 pandemic in Saskatchewan)
- March 30: Fort Vermilion School Division school trustee by-election (cancelled due to acclamation).

== April through June ==
- April 4:
  - Municipal by-election District 6, Eastern Shelburne County, Nova Scotia (postponed due to the COVID-19 pandemic in Nova Scotia)
  - Municipal by-elections in Rossland and Victoria, British Columbia (postponed due to the COVID-19 pandemic in British Columbia)
- April 27: Municipal by-election in Ward 7, Windsor, Ontario (postponed due to the COVID-19 pandemic in Ontario)
- May 11: **New Brunswick municipal elections** (postponed to 2021 due to the COVID-19 pandemic in New Brunswick)
- **May 23: Yukon Party leadership election**
- June 8: Municipal by-election in Innisfail, Alberta
- June 15: Provincial by-elections in Saint Croix and Shediac Bay-Dieppe, New Brunswick (postponed due to the COVID-19 pandemic in New Brunswick)
- June 15–26: **Green Party of British Columbia leadership election** (postponed due to the COVID-19 pandemic in British Columbia)

== July through September ==
- July 24: Territorial by-elections in Baker Lake and Kugluktuk, Nunavut (cancelled; both candidates acclaimed)
- **August 3: Liberal Party of Newfoundland and Labrador leadership election**
- **August 21: Conservative Party of Canada leadership election (postponed from June 27 due to the COVID-19 pandemic in Canada)**
- August 24: Pangnirtung, Nunavut mayoral by-election.
- August 29:
  - Kitigan Zibi Anishinabeg First Nation band council election.
  - Saskatchewan municipal elections in resort villages (postponed due to COVID-19 pandemic)
- September 12:
  - Arrow Lakes School District by-election.
  - Yuułuʔiłʔatḥ Government legislative by-election
- **September 5–13: Green Party of British Columbia leadership election** (postponed from June 26 due to the COVID-19 pandemic in British Columbia)
- September 14:
  - **New Brunswick general election**
  - Mayoral and Ward 2 council by-election in North Shore, Ontario
- September 15: Municipal by-election in Ward 1, Pelham, Ontario
- September 25:
  - Municipal by-election in Alexandria Ward, North Glengarry, Ontario
  - Municipal by-election in Ward 5, Rural Municipality of Taché, Manitoba
- September 26: Mayoral by-election in Fort St. James, British Columbia

== October ==
- **October 3: Green Party of Canada leadership election**
- October 4: Mayoral by-elections in Drummondville (cancelled; candidate acclaimed) and L'Ancienne-Lorette, Quebec (suspended)
- October 5: Municipal by-elections in Cumberland Ward, Ottawa, Ward 7 in Windsor, Ontario and Ward 7 in Cambridge, Ontario.
- October 6: Provincial by-election in Humber-Gros Morne, Newfoundland and Labrador
- **October 9: Parti Québécois leadership election**
- October 10: Municipal and mayoral by-elections in Greenwood, British Columbia
- October 13: Municipal by-election in Thompson, Manitoba
- October 17:
  - **Nova Scotia municipal elections**
  - Municipal by-elections in Dawson Creek and Smithers, British Columbia (mayor and councillor)
- October 18: Asbestos, Quebec name change referendum.
- October 19:
  - York Region District School Board by-election for the seat of Richmond Hill Wards 1, 2 & 4.
  - Municipal by-election in Crossfield, Alberta
- October 20: Municipal by-election in Ward 2, St. John's, Newfoundland and Labrador
- October 24:
  - **British Columbia general election**
  - Mayoral by-election in Lake Cowichan, British Columbia
- October 26:
  - Municipal by-election in Crowsnest Pass, Alberta
  - Federal by-elections in Toronto Centre and York Centre
  - **Saskatchewan general election**

== November through December ==
- November 2: Provincial by-election in Charlottetown-Winsloe, Prince Edward Island.
- November 4: Brandon School Division Ward 1 Board of Trustees by-election.
- November 9:
  - **Saskatchewan municipal elections**
  - Arviat and Coral Harbour, Nunavut Liquor Plebiscites
- November 12: Municipal election in Swift Current, Saskatchewan (delayed from Nov. 9 due to snowstorm)
- November 13: Municipal election in Saskatoon, Saskatchewan (delayed from Nov. 9 due to snowstorm)
- November 14: Municipal by-election in Port Clements, British Columbia
- November 16: Municipal election in Maple Creek, Saskatchewan (delayed from Nov. 9 due to snowstorm)
- November 21: Municipal by-elections in Queen Charlotte and Sayward, British Columbia
- November 28: Municipal by-elections in the Cowichan Valley Regional District (Area H) and Rossland, British Columbia
- December 5: Municipal by-election in Grand Forks, British Columbia
- December 7: Municipal by-election in Ward 2, Bradford West Gwillimbury, Ontario
- December 12: Comox Valley School District by-election and municipal by-election in Victoria, British Columbia
- December 13: Mayoral by-election in L'Ancienne-Lorette and municipal by-election in Du Faubourg District, Sorel-Tracy, Quebec
- December 14: Northwest Territories municipal elections (hamlets only)
- December 19: Municipal by-election in Lytton, British Columbia
