= 2011 Canadian electoral calendar =

2011 elections in Canada

This is a list of elections in Canada in 2011. Included are provincial, municipal and federal elections, by-elections on any level, referendums and party leadership races at any level.

== January to April ==
- February 1 - 2011 Lethbridge municipal by-election
- February 15 - Provincial by-election in Humber West, Newfoundland and Labrador
- February 26 - 2011 British Columbia Liberal Party leadership election
- April 2 - 2011 Progressive Conservative Party of Newfoundland and Labrador leadership election
- April 16 - 2011 New Brunswick New Democratic Party leadership election
- April 17 - 2011 British Columbia New Democratic Party leadership election

== May to August ==
- May 2 - 2011 federal election
- May 11 - Provincial by-election in Vancouver-Point Grey, British Columbia
- May 28
  - 2011 Alberta Party leadership election
  - 2011 British Columbia Conservative Party leadership election
  - May 2011 Liberal Party of Newfoundland and Labrador leadership election
  - 2011 Yukon Party leadership election
- June 6 - Lacombe County, Alberta municipal by-election, 2011
- June 21 - Cape Breton North provincial by-election, Nova Scotia
- June 13—August 5 - 2011 British Columbia sales tax referendum
- August 14 - August 2011 Liberal Party of Newfoundland and Labrador leadership election

== September to December ==
- September 10 - 2011 Alberta Liberal Party leadership election
- September 12 - Territorial by-election in Iqaluit West, Nunavut
- September 17 & October 1 - 2011 Progressive Conservative Association of Alberta leadership election
- September 19 - 2011 Mississauga Ward 5 by-election
- October 3
  - 2011 Prince Edward Island general election
  - 2011 Northwest Territories general election
- October 4 - 2011 Manitoba general election
- October 6 - 2011 Ontario general election
- October 11
  - 2011 Newfoundland and Labrador general election
  - 2011 Yukon general election
- October 26 - 2011 Saskatchewan municipal elections
- November 7 - 2011 Saskatchewan general election
- November 19 - 2011 British Columbia municipal elections
- December 5 – Provincial by-election in Bonaventure, Quebec
- December 11 - 2011 Bloc Québécois leadership election

== See also ==
- Municipal elections in Canada
- Elections in Canada
