= 2013 Canadian electoral calendar =

2013 elections in Canada

This is a list of elections in Canada in 2013. Included are provincial, municipal and federal elections, by-elections on any level, referendums and party leadership races at any level.

== January to April ==
- January 26 - 2013 Ontario Liberal Party leadership election
- March 9 - 2013 Saskatchewan New Democratic Party leadership election
- March 17 - 2013 Quebec Liberal Party leadership election
- April 14 - 2013 Liberal Party of Canada leadership election
- April 15 - Provincial by-election in Kent, New Brunswick

== May to August ==
- May 5 - Québec solidaire co-spokesperson election
- May 13 - Federal by-election in Labrador
- May 14 - 2013 British Columbia general election
- June 25 - Provincial by-election in Cartwright-L'Anse au Clair, Newfoundland and Labrador
- July 10 - Provincial by-election in Westside-Kelowna, British Columbia
- August 1 - Provincial by-elections in Etobicoke—Lakeshore, London West, Ottawa South, Scarborough—Guildwood and Windsor—Tecumseh, Ontario

== September to December ==
- September 24 - 2013 Newfoundland and Labrador municipal elections
- October 8 - 2013 Nova Scotia general election
- October 21 - 2013 Alberta municipal elections
- October 26 - 2013 Manitoba Liberal Party leadership election
- October 28 - 2013 Nunavut general election
- October 28 - municipal by-elections and plebiscites in New Brunswick
- November 3 - 2013 Quebec municipal elections
- November 15–17 - 2013 Liberal Party of Newfoundland and Labrador leadership election
- November 25 - Federal by-election in Bourassa, Brandon—Souris, Provencher, and Toronto Centre
- November 26 - Provincial by-election in Carbonear-Harbour Grace, Newfoundland and Labrador
- December 2 - Nunavut municipal elections, 2013 (hamlets)
- December 2 - Municipal plebiscites in New Brunswick
- December 9 - Provincial by-election in Outremont and Viau, Quebec
- December 9 - Municipal by-election in Windsor, Ontario for city council Ward 7.

== See also ==
- Municipal elections in Canada
- Elections in Canada
