= 2009 Canadian electoral calendar =

2009 elections in Canada

This is a list of notable elections in Canada in 2009. Included are provincial, municipal and federal elections, by-elections on any level, referendums and party leadership races at any level.

== March ==
- 5 March: provincial by-election in Haliburton—Kawartha Lakes—Brock, Ontario
- 8 March: 2009 Ontario New Democratic Party leadership election
- 9 March: provincial by-election Restigouche-La-Vallée, New Brunswick
- 17 March: Municipal by-election in River Heights-Fort Garry Ward of Winnipeg City Council
- 24 March: Manitoba provincial by-elections in Elmwood and The Pas

== May ==
- 2 May: 2009 Liberal Party of Canada leadership election
- 12 May: 2009 British Columbia general election and 2009 British Columbia electoral reform referendum

== June ==
- 6 June: 2009 Nova Scotia general election
- 7 June: Saskatchewan New Democratic Party leadership election, 2009
- 22 June: 2009 Quebec provincial by-elections in Marguerite-Bourgeoys and Rivière-du-Loup
- 27 June: 2009 Progressive Conservative Party of Ontario leadership election

== July ==
- 25 July: 2009 Saskatchewan municipal elections

== September ==
- 14 September: Provincial by-election in Calgary-Glenmore, Alberta
- 17 September: Provincial by-election in St. Paul's, Ontario
- 19 September: Municipal by-election in District 6 (Dartmouth East-Lakes) on Halifax Regional Council
- 21 September: Provincial by-elections in Regina Douglas Park and Saskatoon Riversdale, Saskatchewan
- 21 September: Provincial by-election in Rousseau, Quebec
- 26 September: Yukon New Democratic Party leadership election
- 29 September: 2009 Newfoundland and Labrador municipal elections

== October ==
- 15 October: 2009 Yukon municipal elections
- 17 October: 2009 New Democratic Party of Manitoba leadership election
- 17 October: 2009 Wildrose Alliance Party of Alberta leadership election
- 18 October: 2009 Action Démocratique du Québec leadership election
- 19 October: 2009 Northwest Territories municipal elections (taxed communities)
- 19 October: 2009 Iqaluit municipal election
- 20 October: Provincial by-elections in Antigonish and Inverness in Nova Scotia.
- 27 October: Provincial by-election in The Straits - White Bay North in Newfoundland and Labrador
- 28 October: 2009 Saskatchewan municipal elections

== November ==
- 1 November: 2009 Quebec municipal elections
- 2 November: Prince Edward Island municipal elections, 2009, excluding Charlottetown, Cornwall, Stratford and Summerside
- 9 November: 2009 Canadian federal by-elections in Cumberland—Colchester—Musquodoboit Valley, Hochelaga, Montmagny—L'Islet—Kamouraska—Rivière-du-Loup, and New Westminster—Coquitlam.
- 13 November: 2009 Green Party of Ontario leadership election
- 26 November: Provincial by-election in Terra Nova, Newfoundland and Labrador

== December ==
- 7 December: Nunavut municipal elections, 2009 (hamlets)

== See also ==
- Municipal elections in Canada
- Elections in Canada
