= 2006 Canadian electoral calendar =

2006 elections in Canada

This is a list of elections in Canada in 2006. Included are provincial, municipal and federal elections, by-elections on any level, referendums, and party leadership races at any level.

== January ==
- 9: Municipal by-election in Orléans Ward, Ottawa
- 23: 2006 federal election

== February ==
- 11: Nova Scotia Green Party leadership election
- 21: Provincial by-election in Placentia and St. Mary's, Newfoundland and Labrador

== March ==
- 5: Green Party of Nova Scotia leadership convention
- 30: Provincial by-elections in Nepean—Carleton, Toronto—Danforth and Whitby—Ajax in Ontario

== April ==
- 10: Provincial by-election in Sainte-Marie–Saint-Jacques, Quebec
- 23: New Democratic Party of Prince Edward Island leadership election
- 29: Progressive Conservative Party of Manitoba leadership election

== May ==
- 27: Parti vert du Québec leadership election
- 27: Green Party of Saskatchewan leadership election
- 28: New Democratic Party of Newfoundland and Labrador leadership election

== June ==
- 13: Nova Scotia general election
- 15: Municipal elections held in Dawson City, Yukon
- 19: Provincial by-election in Weyburn-Big Muddy, Saskatchewan
- 26: Municipal by-elections held in Nigadoo, Pointe-Verte, St. Leonard, Salisbury and Sussex, New Brunswick

== July ==
- 22: 2006 Saskatchewan municipal elections

== August ==
- 14: Provincial by-elections in Pointe-aux-Trembles and Taillon in Quebec
- 24-27: Green Party of Canada leadership election

== September ==
- 14: Provincial by-election in Parkdale—High Park, Ontario
- 18: New Brunswick general election
- 24: Municipal by-election in Marie-Victorin Ward, Montreal

== October ==
- 2: Yukon School Council elections
- 3: Nunatsiavut Assembly Election
- 10: Yukon general election
- 16: Territorial by-election in Tununiq, Nunavut
- 16: Municipal elections in Yellowknife, Hay River, Fort Simpson, Norman Wells, Fort Smith and Inuvik and for district education authorities in the Northwest Territories.
- 19: Municipal elections in the Yukon
- 25: Municipal elections in Manitoba
- 25: 2006 Saskatchewan municipal elections

== November ==
- 1: Provincial by-election in Signal Hill-Quidi Vidi, Newfoundland and Labrador
- 5: Municipal elections in Port-Cartier, Sept-Îles and Thetford Mines, Quebec
- 6: Municipal elections in Prince Edward Island
- 13: Municipal elections in Ontario
- 19: Green Party of Manitoba leadership election
- 25: Green Party of Manitoba leadership election
- 27: Federal by-elections in London North Centre and Repentigny

== December ==
- 2-3: Liberal Party of Canada leadership election

== See also ==
- Municipal elections in Canada
- Elections in Canada
