= 2019 Canadian electoral calendar =

2019 elections in Canada

This is a list of elections in Canada scheduled to be held in 2019. Included are municipal, provincial and federal elections, by-elections on any level, referendums and party leadership races at any level. In bold are provincewide or federal elections (including provincewide municipal elections) and party leadership races.

== January through April ==
- January 10: Blueberry River First Nation family councillor by-election
- January 24: Topsail-Paradise, Newfoundland and Labrador provincial by-election
- January 30: Nanaimo, British Columbia provincial by-election
- February 5: New-Wes-Valley, Newfoundland and Labrador municipal by-election
- February 13: St-Pierre-Jolys, Manitoba municipal by-election
- February 25: Federal by-elections in Burnaby South, York—Simcoe and Outremont
- March 2:
  - Hornby Island Local Trust Area by-election
  - Lytton, British Columbia municipal by-election
- March 11: Thompson, Manitoba municipal by-election
- March 14: Selkirk First Nation council by-election (cancelled due to acclaimation)
- March 30: Cariboo Regional District Area F Director by-election
- April 3: Municipal by-election in Nipawin, Saskatchewan
- April 6:
  - Alberni-Clayoquot Regional District Areas B and F by-elections
  - North Saanich municipal by-election
  - Powell River municipal by-election
  - Tsawwassen First Nation legislative election
- April 8: Municipal by-elections in Turner Valley, Alberta (mayoral race was acclaimed)
- April 10: Mayerthorpe, Alberta municipal by-election
- April 15: Municipal by-election in Rideau-Rockcliffe Ward in Ottawa
- **April 16: 2019 Alberta general election**
- April 17: Municipal by-election in Muenster, Saskatchewan
- **April 23: 2019 Prince Edward Island general election**
- April 25: York Region District School Board by-election for Vaughan wards 1 & 2

== May through June ==
- May 3: Municipal by-election in Rocky Mountain House, Alberta
- May 5:
  - Municipal by-election in District 2, Saint-Colomban, Quebec
  - Mayoral by-election in Trois-Rivières, Quebec
- May 6:
  - Federal by-election in Nanaimo—Ladysmith
  - Municipal by-elections in New Brunswick: Saint John (Ward 3), Beaubassin East (Ward 4), Bertrand, Blacks Harbour, Campobello (mayor), Florenceville-Bristol (Ward 2), Hanwell, Le Goulet, Paquetville, Rivière-Verte, and Sainte-Marie-Saint-Raphaël (mayor and council) and plebiscite in Rogersville
- May 9: Municipal by-election in Paradise, Newfoundland and Labrador
- May 11:
  - Municipal by-election in Cranbrook, British Columbia
  - Haida Gwaii School District by-election
- **May 16: 2019 Newfoundland and Labrador general election**
- May 18: Municipal by-election in Yarmouth, Nova Scotia
- June 2:
  - Municipal by-election in District 4, Baie-d'Urfé, Quebec
  - Municipal by-election in District 4, Saint-Bruno-de-Montarville, Quebec
- June 3: Haisla Nation election
- June 9:
  - Municipal by-election in District 1, Brownsburg-Chatham, Quebec
  - Municipal by-elections in Saint-Lazare, Quebec
- June 12: Municipal by-election in Valleyview, Alberta
- June 15: By-election for Director of Electoral Area A (Metro Vancouver, British Columbia)
- June 16:
  - Municipal by-election in District 4, Drummondville, Quebec
  - Municipal by-election in District 3, La Malbaie, Quebec
- June 18: Provincial by-election in Sackville-Cobequid, Nova Scotia
- June 20: Municipal by-elections in Wards 2 and 3 in the Municipality of Oakland – Wawanesa, Manitoba
- June 23: Municipal by-elections (including mayor) in Chambly, Quebec

== July through September ==
- July 7: Municipal by-election in Moisie-Les Plages District, Sept-Îles, Quebec
- July 10: Municipal by-election in Spruce Grove, Alberta
- July 13:
  - Municipal by-election for councillor in Nakusp, British Columbia
  - School District 87 Stikine, British Columbia Trustee by-election
- July 15:
  - Deferred election in Charlottetown-Hillsborough Park, Prince Edward Island
  - Carcross/Tagish First Nation by-election
- July 17: Municipal by-election in Maple Creek, Saskatchewan
- July 27:
  - Haida Nation council by-election for Skidegate
  - School District 78 Fraser-Cascade, British Columbia trustee by-election
- August 1: Tsawwassen First Nation legislative by-elections
- September 3: Provincial by-elections in Argyle-Barrington, Northside-Westmount and Sydney River-Mira-Louisbourg, Nova Scotia
- September 4:
  - Municipal by-elections in the Municipality of Norfolk Treherne, Manitoba
  - Haisla Nation by-election.
- September 7: Municipal by-election in Stewart, British Columbia
- September 10: **2019 Manitoba general election**
- September 11: Municipal by-election in Wetaskiwin, Alberta
- September 14:
  - Municipal by-election in Port Alice, British Columbia
  - Municipal by-election in Annapolis Royal, Nova Scotia
- September 16: Territorial by-election in Tununiq, Nunavut
- September 17:
  - Municipal by-election in Grand Falls-Windsor, Newfoundland and Labrador
  - Municipal by-election in Electoral Division 5, Westlock County and Division 2, Sturgeon County, Alberta
- September 24: Municipal by-election in Bishop's Falls, Newfoundland and Labrador
- September 28: Municipal by-election in Sooke, British Columbia
- September 29: Municipal by-election in District 4, Oka, Quebec

== October through December ==
- **October 1: 2019 Northwest Territories general election**
- October 5:
  - Municipal by-election in the Regional District of Nanaimo (Nanaimo G).
  - Municipal special election in District 15 Lower Sackville, Halifax, Nova Scotia.
- October 6: Municipal by-elections in District 2, La Tuque; District 5 (Vieux-Nord), Lac-Mégantic; and Le Plateau-Mont-Royal Borough Mayor, Montreal, Quebec.
- October 21:
  - **2019 Canadian federal election**
  - Municipal by-election in Foam Lake, Saskatchewan
- October 23: Municipal by-elections in Wolseley and Naicam, Saskatchewan.
- October 24: Elk Island Catholic Schools trustee by-election, Fort Saskatchewan, Alberta Ward 2.
- October 27: Municipal by-election in District 3, Verchères, Quebec
- October 28:
  - **Nunavut municipal elections**
  - Champagne and Aishihik First Nations council by-election
- November 2: Municipal by-elections in Tofino and Osoyoos, British Columbia.
- November 10: Municipal by-election District 5 (du Berceau) in Saint-Joseph-du-Lac, Quebec
- November 24:
  - Municipal by-election in District 19 (Marc-Aurèle-Fortin), Laval, Quebec
  - Hampstead, Quebec development project referendum.
- November 25: First Nation of Na-Cho Nyak Dun by-election (youth councillor).
- November 30: Municipal by-election in Telkwa, British Columbia
- December 1: Municipal by-election in District 5 Richelieu, Quebec
- December 2: Provincial by-election in Jean-Talon, Quebec
- December 9:
  - Northwest Territories municipal elections, 2019 (hamlets)
  - Nunavut District Education Authority by-elections in Qikiqtarjuaq, Arctic Bay and Clyde River, Nunavut
- December 15: Municipal by-election in District 6, Chelsea; and District 1, Saguenay, Quebec
- December 16: Mayoral by-election in Cape Dorset, Nunavut.
