= 2017 Canadian electoral calendar =

2017 elections in Canada

This is a list of elections in Canada scheduled to be held in 2017. Included are provincial, municipal and federal elections, by-elections on any level, referendums and party leadership races at any level.

== January to February ==
- January 7: North Cedar, British Columbia Improvement District by-election.
- January 14: Radium Hot Springs, British Columbia municipal by-election.
- January 18: Naicam, Saskatchewan council by-election
- January 21:
  - School District 92 Nisga'a, British Columbia by-election.
  - School District 27 Cariboo-Chilcotin, British Columbia by-election.
- January 28: Mackenzie, British Columbia municipal by-election.
- February 5: Coaticook, Quebec District 1 municipal by-election.
- February 11: Salt Spring Island, British Columbia Fire Protection District trustee by-election.
- February 13:
  - Ward 42 by-election, Toronto City Council
  - Yukon Francophone School Board trustee by-election
- February 25: Warfield, British Columbia municipal by-election.
- February 27:
  - Drayton Valley, Alberta municipal by-election.
  - Taku River Tlingit First Nation clan director by-election.

== March to April ==
- March 2:
  - Lax Kw'alaams Indian Band trustee by-election
  - Saskatoon Meewasin provincial by-election.
  - Nee-Tahi-Buhn Band councillor by-election.
- March 3: Wet'suwet'en First Nation: Broman Lake councillor by-election.
- March 4:
  - Wells, British Columbia municipal by-election.
  - McBride, British Columbia municipal by-election.
- March 9&12: Roseau River Anishinabe First Nation, Manitoba band council election and re-vote
- March 14: 2017 Bloc Québécois leadership election
- March 18:
  - 2017 Progressive Conservative Association of Alberta leadership election
  - Municipality of the District of St. Mary's, Nova Scotia District 3/5 special election.
- March 24: Peguis First Nation, Manitoba chief and council election.
- March 25:
  - Port Clements, British Columbia mayoral and municipal by-elections.
  - School District 27 Cariboo-Chilcotin, British Columbia trustee by-election.
  - Tsawwassen First Nation legislative by-election.
- March 27: Georgina, Ontario Ward 1 municipal by-election
- March 31: Lake Cowichan First Nation land code ratification vote.
- April 3: Federal by-elections in Ottawa—Vanier, Markham—Thornhill, Saint-Laurent, Calgary Heritage and Calgary Midnapore.
- April 6: Hupacasath First Nation general election.
- April 10: Iqaluit, Nunavut municipal by-election.
- April 12:
  - Chinook School Division school board trustee by-election.
  - Halalt First Nation general election.
- April 21: Sq'ewlets First Nation chief and council general election.
- April 22:
  - School District 74 Gold Trail, British Columbia trustee by-election.
  - Lower Nicola Indian Band by-election
- April 27: Frog Lake First Nation general election.
- April 29: School District 19 Revelstoke, British Columbia trustee by-election.

== May to June ==
- May 1: Stratford, Prince Edward Island Stewart Cove Ward by-election.
- May 4: Seabird Island First Nation: Business plan and land use plane referendum.
- May 8: Gitwangak Indian Band: Chief and council general election.
- May 9: 2017 British Columbia general election
- May 10: Horizon School Division, Saskatchewan trustee by-election.
- May 12: Skin Tyee First Nation: Council by-election.
- May 15:
  - Kingston, Ontario District 1 municipal by-election
  - Municipal by-elections in Kedgwick, Le Goulet, Maisonnette, Shippagan, Salisbury and Saint-André, New Brunswick
  - Municipal election in Haut-Madawaska, New Brunswick
  - Plebiscites in the Local Service Districts of Cap-Bateau, Coteau Road, Haut-Lamèque, Miscou Island, Ste. Cecile, Petite-Lamèque, Pigeon Hill, Pointe-Alexandre, Pointe-Canot and Parish of Shippegan, New Brunswick
- May 21:
  - 2017 Québec solidaire female co-spokesperson election
  - 2017 Québec solidaire male co-spokesperson election
- May 27:
  - 2017 Conservative Party of Canada leadership election
  - Métis Nation—Saskatchewan general election
- May 29: Provincial by-election in Gouin, Quebec.
- May 30: 2017 Nova Scotia general election
- June 1: Provincial by-election in Sault Ste. Marie, Ontario
- June 2: McLeod Lake Band: Chief and council general election
- June 4: 2017 Alberta Liberal Party leadership election
- June 5: Rideau Lakes, Ontario municipal by-election in Bastard & South Burgess Ward. (Election had been planned for July, but was filled by acclamation on June 5.)
- June 8: Aamjiwnaang First Nation by-elections.
- June 10: Creston, British Columbia municipal by-election
- June 13: Provincial by-election in Point Douglas, Manitoba
- June 20: Ka:'yu:'k't'h'/Che:k:tlesʔet'h' legislative by-election.
- June 24:
  - Lake Country, British Columbia municipal by-elections
  - Temagami First Nation Land Code Ratification Vote

== July to August ==
- July 5: Tsawout First Nation: General election
- July 7:
  - Gwa'sala-'Nakwaxda'xw Nations: Chief and council general election
  - Gitsegukla Indian Band: General election.
- July 8: Nanaimo, British Columbia municipal by-election.
- July 19:
  - Rural Municipality of Ritchot, Manitoba: Mayoral and council by-elections
  - Municipality of Swan River, Manitoba reeve by-election
- July 20: Kispiox Band Council: Chief and council general election.
- July 25: Enoch Cree Nation: Chief and council general election
- July 29: Lunenburg, Nova Scotia special election
- July 2 to August 2: Long Plain First Nation: Community Ratification Vote - Land Code
- August 11: Tobacco Indian Band council by-election
- August 19: planned Central Coast Regional District Electoral Area B by-election. Election cancelled as no valid nomination received.
- August 30: Rural Municipality of South Qu'Appelle No. 157, Saskatchewan Division 2 council by-election.

== September ==
- September 7:
  - Saskatoon Fairview provincial by-election
  - We Wai Kai Nation council by-election
- September 9: Fort St. John, British Columbia council by-election
- September 16:
  - 2017 Manitoba New Democratic Party leadership election
  - Wells, British Columbia municipal by-election.
- September 19: Lynn Lake, Manitoba by-election.
- September 20: Nipawin, Saskatchewan council by-election
- September 23: Saanich, British Columbia council by-election
- September 26: 2017 Newfoundland and Labrador municipal elections
- September 30:
  - Kamloops, British Columbia mayoral by-election.
  - Port Moody, British Columbia council by-election.
  - Cowichan Valley Regional District Area B (Shawnigan Lake) by-election

== October ==
- October 1: 2017 New Democratic Party leadership election
- October 2: Louis-Hébert provincial by-election.
- October 14:
  - Vancouver City Council and Vancouver School Board by-elections
  - Municipality of Chester, Nova Scotia District 1 council by-election
- October 16: 2017 Alberta municipal elections
- October 17: Come By Chance, Newfoundland and Labrador by-election
- October 18: Eston, Saskatchewan council by-election
- October 20: 2017 Progressive Conservative Party of Prince Edward Island leadership election
- October 21:
  - 2017 Manitoba Liberal Party leadership election
  - Cranbrook, British Columbia council by-election
  - Lions Bay, British Columbia council by-election
  - Municipality of Colchester, Nova Scotia District 9 council by-election
- October 23:
  - Essex, Ontario Ward 3 by-election
  - Federal by-elections in Sturgeon River—Parkland and Lac-Saint-Jean
  - Municipal by-elections in Grande-Anse (mayor), McAdam, Nigadoo, Petit Rocher, Rexton and Saint-André (mayor), New Brunswick.
  - Municipal plebiscite in the local service districts of Keswick Ridge, Douglas, Bright, and portions Kingsclear and Queensbury, New Brunswick to form a new rural municipality.
- October 25: Osler, Saskatchewan municipal by-election
- October 27: 2017 New Brunswick New Democratic Party leadership election (planned date, cancelled due to having just one candidate)
- October 28:
  - 2017 United Conservative Party leadership election (Alberta)
  - Whistler, British Columbia council by-election
  - Ɂakisq̓nuk First Nation by-election
- October 30: 2017 Nunavut general election

== November to December ==
- November 4: Kaslo, British Columbia municipal by-election
- November 5: 2017 Quebec municipal elections
- November 18:
  - View Royal, British Columbia council by-election
  - Queen Charlotte, British Columbia municipal by-election
- November 21: Mount Pearl North, Newfoundland and Labrador provincial by-election.
- November 27: Charlottetown-Parkdale, Prince Edward Island provincial by-election.
- December 2: Oliver, British Columbia municipal by-election
- December 4: Nunavut municipal elections, 2017 (hamlets)
- December 11: Federal by-elections in Bonavista—Burin—Trinity, Scarborough—Agincourt, Battlefords—Lloydminster and South Surrey—White Rock.
- December 14: Provincial by-election in Calgary-Lougheed, Alberta.

== See also ==
- Municipal elections in Canada
- Elections in Canada
