= 2014 Canadian electoral calendar =

List of Elections in Canada in 2014

2014 elections in Canada

This is a list of elections in Canada in 2014. Included are provincial, municipal and federal elections, by-elections on any level, referendums and party leadership races at any level.

== January to April ==
- January 8 - Municipal by-election in Lloydminster (Alberta/Saskatchewan)
- January 28 - Provincial by-elections in Arthur-Virden and Morris, Manitoba
- February 10 - Territorial by-election in Rankin Inlet South, Nunavut
- February 13 - Provincial by-elections in Niagara Falls and Thornhill, Ontario
- April 7 - 2014 Quebec general election
- April 9 - Provincial by-election in Virginia Waters, Newfoundland and Labrador
- April 12
  - Kitimat Enbridge Northern Gateway Project plebiscite, 2014 - non binding municipal plebiscite in Kitimat, British Columbia
  - British Columbia Conservative Party leadership election, 2014
- April 14 - Morinville, Alberta plebiscite
- April 16 - Municipal by-election in North Battleford, Saskatchewan

== May to August ==
- May 4 - 2014 British Columbia New Democratic Party leadership election
- May 6 - Nunatsiavut general election, 2014
- May 12
  - First municipal election in the new Regional Municipality of Grand Tracadie–Sheila, New Brunswick
  - Municipal by-election in Lethbridge, Alberta
- June 12 - 2014 Ontario general election
- June 14 - 2014 Bloc Québécois leadership election
- June 15 - Mayoral and municipal by-elections in Oka, Quebec
- June 30 - Federal by-elections in Fort McMurray—Athabasca, Alberta, Macleod, Alberta, Scarborough—Agincourt, Ontario, and Trinity—Spadina, Ontario
- July 13 - Municipal by-election in Deux-Montagnes, Quebec
- July 21 - Mayoral by-election in Lac La Biche County, Alberta
- July 25 - Municipal elections in Winnipeg Beach, Dunnottar, and Victoria Beach, Manitoba
- August 2 - Municipal by-election in Norris Beach, Alberta
- August 8 - Saskatchewan Liberal Party leadership election, 2014
- August 26 - Provincial by-election in St. George's-Stephenville East, Newfoundland and Labrador

== September to October ==
- September 6 - 2014 Progressive Conservative Association of Alberta leadership election
- September 13 - 2014 Progressive Conservative Party of Newfoundland and Labrador leadership election
- September 21 - Municipal by-elections in Shawville, Quebec, Donnacona, Quebec and Brownsburg-Chatham, Quebec
- September 22 - 2014 New Brunswick general election
- September 23 - Municipal by-election in Pasadena, Newfoundland and Labrador
- September 30 - Municipal by-election in Wabush, Newfoundland and Labrador
- October 5 - Municipal by-elections in Wentworth, Quebec and Chambly, Quebec
- October 6 - Cardston, Alberta plebiscite
- October 18 - 2014 Alberta New Democratic Party leadership election
- October 20 - Provincial by-election in Lévis, Quebec
- October 22 - 2014 Manitoba municipal elections
- October 22 - 2014 Saskatchewan municipal elections
- October 27
  - 2014 Ontario municipal elections
  - Provincial by-elections in Calgary-Elbow, Calgary-Foothills, Calgary-West and Edmonton-Whitemud, Alberta
- October 29 Saskatoon, Saskatchewan separate school board by-election

== November to December ==
- November 2
  - 2014 Quebec school board elections
  - Municipal by-election in l'Île-Perrot, Quebec
- November 3 - 2014 Prince Edward Island municipal elections (cities, Cornwall, & Stratford)
- November 5
  - Provincial by-election in Conception Bay South, Newfoundland and Labrador
- November 9 - Mayoral and municipal by-elections in Sainte-Martine, Quebec
- November 13 - Provincial by-election in Lloydminster, Saskatchewan
- November 15 - 2014 British Columbia municipal elections
- November 16 - Mayoral and municipal by-elections in La Prairie, Quebec
- November 17
  - Federal by-elections in Whitby—Oshawa, Ontario, and Yellowhead, Alberta
  - Provincial by-election in Saint John East, New Brunswick
- November 25 - Provincial by-elections in Trinity-Bay de Verde and Humber East, Newfoundland and Labrador
- December 1 - Nunavut municipal elections, 2014 (hamlets)
- December 8
  - Northwest Territories municipal elections, 2014 (hamlets)
  - Municipal by-elections in 24 New Brunswick municipalities including mayoral by-elections in Beaubassin East, Le Goulet, Pointe-Verte and Shippagan.
- December 14 - Municipal by-election in Saint-Joseph-du-Lac, Quebec
- December 12–15 - Mayoral by-election in Russell, Ontario (postponed from municipal elections due to the death of a candidate)

== See also ==
- Municipal elections in Canada
- Elections in Canada
