= 2015 Canadian electoral calendar =

2015 elections in Canada

This is a list of elections in Canada in 2015. Included are provincial, municipal and federal elections, by-elections on any level, referendums and party leadership races at any level.

== January to April ==
- January 8 - Municipal by-election in Happy Valley-Goose Bay, Newfoundland and Labrador
- February 5 - Provincial by-election in Sudbury, Ontario
- February 9 - Territorial by-election in Uqqummiut, Nunavut
- February 10 - Municipal by-election in Camrose, Alberta
- February 15 - Mayoral and council by-elections in Amos, Quebec
- February 21 - 2015 Prince Edward Island Liberal Party leadership election
- February 28 - 2015 Progressive Conservative Party of Prince Edward Island leadership election
- March 1 - Municipal by-election in Port-Cartier, Quebec
- March 7:
  - 2015 New Democratic Party of Manitoba leadership election
  - Newfoundland and Labrador New Democratic Party leadership election, 2015
  - Pouce Coupe, British Columbia municipal by-election
- March 8 - Mayoral and municipal by-elections in Plessisville, Quebec
- March 9 - Provincial by-election in Richelieu, Quebec
- March 17 - Municipal by-election in Bruderheim, Alberta
- March 22 - Outremont borough council by-election in Robert-Bourassa District, Montreal
- March 23 - Municipal by-election in Brazeau County, Alberta
- March 28 - Wildrose Party leadership election
- March 30 - Municipal by-election in Wood Buffalo, Alberta
- April 13 - Calgary Board of Education school trustee by-election
- April 21 - Provincial by-election in The Pas, Manitoba.
- April 25 - Bulkley-Nechako Regional District Electoral Area "D" (Fraser Lake Rural) by-election
- March 22 - Municipal by-election in the borough Outremont, Quebec.
- March 30 - Municipal by-election in Fort Erie, Ontario
- April 19 - Municipal by-election in Melbourne, Quebec
- April 26 - Municipal by-election in Dorval, Quebec
- April 27 - Municipal by-election for Ward 4 on Mississauga City Council

== May to August ==
- May 4:
  - Prince Edward Island general election
  - Municipal by-elections in Campobello Island, Fredericton, Miramichi, Nigadoo, Port Elgin and Shediac, New Brunswick
- May 5 - Alberta general election
- May 9:
  - 2015 Progressive Conservative Party of Ontario leadership election
  - Municipal by-election in Guysborough County, Nova Scotia
- May 15 - 2015 Parti Québécois leadership election
- March 16 - May 29 - 2015 Metro Vancouver Transportation and Transit Plebiscite
- June 8 - Provincial by-elections in Chauveau and Jean-Talon, Quebec
- June 17 - Municipal by-election in Neepawa, Manitoba
- June 22 - Municipal by-election in Carstairs, Alberta
- June 24 - Municipal by-election in St. Albert, Alberta
- June 29:
  - Municipal by-election in Atholville, New Brunswick
  - Municipal by-election in Pincher Creek, Alberta
- July 4 - Municipal by-election in the District of Lakeland No. 521, Saskatchewan
- July 7 - Municipal by-election in Moosonee, Ontario
- July 13 - Municipal by-election for Ward 6 on Oakville Town Council
- July 14 - Provincial by-elections in Dartmouth South, Cape Breton Centre and Sydney-Whitney Pier, Nova Scotia
- August 6 - Municipal by-election in Saddle Hills County, Alberta
- August 16 - School board by-election for Commission scolaire de la Capitale
- August 22 - Municipal by-election in West Hants, Nova Scotia
- August 27 - Municipal by-election in Howick, Ontario
- August 30 - Municipal by-election in Verchères, Quebec

== September to October ==
- September 2 - Municipal by-election in the Rural Municipality of La Broquerie, Manitoba
- September 3 - Provincial by-elections in Simcoe North, Ontario and Calgary-Foothills, Alberta
- September 9 - Municipal by-election and referendum in Nipawin, Saskatchewan
- September 16 - Municipal by-election in Meadow Lake, Saskatchewan
- September 21 - Municipal by-election in Halton Hills, Ontario
- September 22 - Municipal by-election in Bruderheim, Alberta
- September 28 - Edmonton Public School Board school trustee by-election.
- October 5 - Provincial by-election in Carleton, New Brunswick
- October 15 - Yukon municipal elections, 2015
- October 19:
  - Canadian federal election
  - Iqaluit municipal elections, 2015
  - Northwest Territories municipal elections, 2015 (taxed communities)
- October 24 - Municipal by-election in Kings County, Nova Scotia
- October 25 - Municipal by-election in Témiscouata-sur-le-Lac, Quebec
- October 26 - Municipal by-election in Maple Creek, Saskatchewan
- October 28 - Municipal by-election in the Rural Municipality of Sherwood No. 159, Saskatchewan
- October 29 - Municipal by-election in Morris, Manitoba

== November to December ==
- November 7 - Municipal by-election in Pemberton, British Columbia
- November 8 - Municipal by-elections in Pontiac and Otter Lake, Quebec
- November 9:
  - Provincial by-elections in Beauce-Sud, Fabre, René-Lévesque and Saint-Henri–Sainte-Anne, Quebec
  - Municipal amalgamation plebiscites in Haut-Madawaska (upper Madawaska County) and Sussex/Sussex Corner, New Brunswick.
- November 15 - Municipal by-election in Saint-Léonard-Est District on Montreal City Council.
- November 16:
  - Municipal by-election in Wellington North, Ontario
  - Municipal by-election in Rocky View County, Alberta
- November 19 - Sunrise School Division school trustee by-election
- November 21 - Municipal by-election in West Hants, Nova Scotia
- November 23:
  - Northwest Territories general election
  - Municipal by-elections in Uxbridge and The Archipelago, Ontario
  - Municipal by-election in Thorsby, Alberta
- November 29 - Municipal by-elections in Brossard, Rivière-du-Loup and Mont-Joli, Quebec.
- November 30 - Newfoundland and Labrador general election
- December 6 - Nunavut municipal elections, 2015 (hamlets)
- December 13:
  - By-election for English Montreal School Board Commissioner in District #4 (Côte Saint-Luc/Hampstead).
  - Municipal by-election in Drummondville, Quebec
- December 20 - Municipal by-election in Granby, Quebec

== Unknown date ==
- Green Party of British Columbia leadership election
- Northwest Territories general election
- Progressive Conservative Association of Alberta leadership election
- Progressive Conservative Party of New Brunswick leadership election

== See also ==
- Municipal elections in Canada
- Elections in Canada
