= 2001 New Brunswick video lottery terminal referendum =

Canadian provincial referendum on gambling

New Brunswick video lottery terminal referendum, 2001
May 14, 2001
- Should the Province of New Brunswick continue to permit the legal and regulated operation of video gaming devices (commonly referred to as video lottery terminals or VLT’s)?

Results
Choice	Votes	%
Yes	122,061	53.11%
No	107,753	46.89%
Valid votes	229,814	100.00%
Invalid or blank votes	0	0.00%
Total votes	229,814	100.00%
Registered voters/turnout	229,814	44%

A referendum on video lottery terminals was held on 14 May 2001 (to coincide with municipal elections) in 103 municipalities in New Brunswick. According to the chief electoral officer's report, "229,814 voters" or "44% of eligible provincial voters, cast referendum ballots"

As of 2025, this is the most recent referendum in New Brunswick.

== Background ==
According to the Canada West Foundation, New Brunswick was the first province to allow video lottery terminals in 1990. The terminals create large profits for the provincial government, with the New Brunswick government alone receiving $53.4 million from the machines between 1999 and 2000. The private businesses that house these machines also make a profit, with 47% ($47 million) of the revenue going to the private sector.

Despite the economic benefit, there is a strong social backlash against the terminals, and gambling in general, especially in Atlantic Canada, according to a 1999 survey by the Canada West Foundation. The survey found that 60% of those surveyed wanted more restrictions on gambling, 56% knew a problem gambler, and 62% agreed that "VLT gambling should be banned in your province".

During the 1999 New Brunswick election, Progressive Conservative leader Bernard Lord promised to hold a referendum on the terminals if elected Premier.

== Referendum question ==
The question was as follows:

Should the Province of New Brunswick continue to permit the legal and regulated operation of video gaming devices (commonly referred to as video lottery terminals or VLT’s) ?

== Results ==
The vote was, in several regions, close to within dozens of votes. The "Yes" side won with just over 53%:

No: 107 753 (46.89%)	Yes: 122 061 (53.11%)
▲

The municipal electoral officer's report showed that, regionally, the areas who largely voted against the VLT's were located in Anglophone sections of the province, or Central and Western New Brunswick (Carleton, York, Victoria, Charlotte, Sunbury and Kings counties) while largely francophone and Acadian areas, such as Moncton, Bouctouche, Bathurst, Miramichi, and Northern New Brunswick (Madawaska and Campbellton) were more in favour of the Terminals.
