= 1995 Marshallese general election =

Parliamentary elections were held in the Marshall Islands on 20 November 1995. As there were no political parties, all candidates for the 33 seats ran as independents. Eight new MPs were elected, whilst two members of the cabinet lost their seats. Following the election, Amata Kabua was re-elected President by MPs.
