= 2005 Cowansville municipal election =

Municipal election in Quebec

The 2005 Cowansville municipal election was held on November 6, 2005, to elect a mayor and councillors in Cowansville, Quebec. Incumbent mayor Arthur Fauteux was re-elected without opposition.

== Results ==
2005 Cowansville election, Mayor of Cowansville
Candidate	Total votes	% of total votes
(incumbent)Arthur Fauteux	accl.	

2005 Cowansville election, Councillor, District One
Candidate	Total votes	% of total votes
(incumbent)Denis Bourcier	264	51.87
Conrad Maheu	245	48.13
Total valid votes	509	100.00

2005 Cowansville election, Councillor, District Two
Candidate	Total votes	% of total votes
(incumbent)Wayne Yates	accl.	

2005 Cowansville election, Councillor, District Three
Candidate	Total votes	% of total votes
(incumbent)Réal Plourde	accl.	.

2005 Cowansville election, Councillor, District Four
Candidate	Total votes	% of total votes
(incumbent)Michel Charbonneau	accl.	.

2005 Cowansville election, Councillor, District Five
Candidate	Total votes	% of total votes
(incumbent)Yvon Pepin	272	47.72
Marc Danis	167	29.30
Guy Patenaude	94	16.49
Michael Cavanaugh	37	6.49
Total valid votes	570	100.00

2005 Cowansville election, Councillor, District Six
Candidate	Total votes	% of total votes
(incumbent)Jacqueline Caron	accl.	.

Source: "Meet your new municipal councils," Sherbrooke Record, 8 November 2005, p. 7.
