= 2002 Cowansville municipal election =

Canadian local election

The 2002 Cowansville municipal election was held on November 3, 2002, to elect a mayor and councillors in Cowansville, Quebec. Incumbent mayor Arthur Fauteux was re-elected without opposition.

== Results ==
2002 Cowansville election, Mayor of Cowansville
Candidate	Total votes	% of total votes
(incumbent) Arthur Fauteux	accl.	

2002 Cowansville election, Councillor, District One
Candidate	Total votes	% of total votes
(incumbent) Denis Bourcier	accl.	.

2002 Cowansville election, Councillor, District Two
Candidate	Total votes	% of total votes
(incumbent) Wayne Yates	accl.	

2002 Cowansville election, Councillor, District Three
Candidate	Total votes	% of total votes
(incumbent)Réal Plourde	accl.	.

2002 Cowansville election, Councillor, District Four
Candidate	Total votes	% of total votes
(incumbent) Michel Charbonneau	accl.	.

2002 Cowansville election, Councillor, District Five
Candidate	Total votes	% of total votes
Jean-Marc Drolet	accl.	.

2002 Cowansville election, Councillor, District Six
Candidate	Total votes	% of total votes
(incumbent) Jacqueline Caron	349	69.52
France Lambert	153	30.48
Total valid votes	502	100.00

Source: "Election 2002 Eastern Townships," Sherbrooke Record, 4 Sherbrooke 2002, p. 4.
