= 1995 New Zealand firefighter referendum =

- 2 December 1995
- "Should the number of professional firefighters employed full time in the New Zealand Fire Service be reduced below the number employed on 1 January 1995?"

Results
| Choice | Votes | % |
|---|---|---|
| Yes | 79,475 | 12.18% |
| No | 572,919 | 87.82% |
| Valid votes | 652,394 | 100.00% |
| Invalid or blank votes | 0 | 0.00% |
| Total votes | 652,394 | 100.00% |
| Registered voters/turnout | 2,419,958 | 26.96% |
- Results by electorate

The first Citizens Initiated Referendum was held in New Zealand on 2 December 1995, based on the question:

Should the number of professional firefighters employed full time in the New Zealand Fire Service be reduced below the number employed on 1 January 1995?

== Results ==
The referendum returned an extremely low voter turnout, with less than 27% of enrolled voters casting a vote.

Results of the referendum, overall and by electorate
| Electorate | ✓ % | Votes | ✗ % | Votes | Total valid votes | Electors on Roll | Turnout |
|---|---|---|---|---|---|---|---|
| Total | 12.18% | 79,475 | 87.82% | 572,919 | 652,394 | 2,419,958 | 26.96% |
| Albany | 9.95% | 1,180 | 90.05% | 10,675 | 11,855 | 38,960 | 30.43% |
| Aoraki | 11.75% | 1,428 | 88.25% | 10,722 | 12,150 | 38,960 | 31.83% |
| Auckland Central | 11.09% | 991 | 88.91% | 7,945 | 8,936 | 38,599 | 23.15% |
| Banks Peninsula | 15.95% | 2,335 | 84.05% | 12,307 | 14,642 | 42,408 | 34.53% |
| Bay of Plenty | 11.60% | 1,027 | 88.40% | 7,828 | 8,855 | 38,333 | 23.10% |
| Christchurch Central | 10.87% | 1,163 | 89.13% | 9,538 | 10,701 | 35,478 | 30.16% |
| Christchurch East | 7.89% | 1,058 | 92.11% | 12,355 | 13,413 | 37,077 | 36.18% |
| Clutha-Southland | 13.90% | 1,184 | 86.10% | 7,335 | 8,519 | 38,158 | 22.33% |
| Coromandel | 11.67% | 1,160 | 88.33% | 8,781 | 9,941 | 40,996 | 24.25% |
| Dunedin North | 10.02% | 1,360 | 89.98% | 12,213 | 13,573 | 37,976 | 35.74% |
| Dunedin South | 8.13% | 1,334 | 91.87% | 15,084 | 16,418 | 40,672 | 40.37% |
| Epsom | 21.79% | 1,873 | 78.21% | 6,723 | 8,596 | 39,957 | 21.51% |
| Hamilton East | 11.51% | 1,058 | 88.49% | 8,734 | 9,792 | 37,349 | 26.22% |
| Hamilton West | 8.11% | 835 | 91.89% | 9,465 | 10,300 | 38,732 | 26.59% |
| Hunua | 10.70% | 962 | 89.30% | 8,032 | 8,994 | 35,006 | 25.96% |
| Hutt South | 18.11% | 1,894 | 81.89% | 8,566 | 10,460 | 36,669 | 28.53% |
| Ilam | 20.61% | 2,724 | 79.39% | 10,496 | 13,220 | 41,867 | 31.58% |
| Invercargill | 8.66% | 1,054 | 91.94% | 11,113 | 12,167 | 38,171 | 31.87% |
| Kaikoura | 15.55% | 1,481 | 84.45% | 8,045 | 9,526 | 39,131 | 24.34% |
| Karapiro | 10.69% | 883 | 89.31% | 7,376 | 8,259 | 38,203 | 21.62% |
| Mahia | 10.15% | 863 | 89.85% | 7,639 | 8,502 | 33,316 | 25.52% |
| Mana | 15.85% | 1,507 | 84.15% | 8,001 | 9,508 | 32,950 | 28.86% |
| Mangere | 7.83% | 452 | 92.17% | 5,317 | 5,769 | 29,385 | 19.63% |
| Manukau East | 9.56% | 744 | 90.44% | 7,036 | 7,780 | 36,906 | 21.08 |
| Manurewa | 6.26% | 455 | 93.74% | 6,814 | 7,269 | 31,324 | 23.21% |
| Maungakiekie | 9.48% | 864 | 90.52% | 8,254 | 9,118 | 36,313 | 25.11% |
| Napier | 9.74% | 1,155 | 90.26% | 10,706 | 11,861 | 37,594 | 31.55% |
| Nelson | 14.45% | 1,605 | 85.55% | 9,504 | 11,109 | 39,510 | 28.12% |
| New Lynn | 6.95% | 710 | 93.05% | 9,509 | 10,219 | 35,016 | 29.18% |
| New Plymouth | 9.54% | 1,217 | 90.56% | 11,540 | 12,757 | 39,913 | 31.96% |
| North Shore | 14.26% | 1,751 | 85.74% | 10,530 | 12,281 | 40,741 | 30.14% |
| Northcote | 9.62% | 1,082 | 90.38% | 10,164 | 11,246 | 38,524 | 29.19% |
| Northland | 13.27% | 926 | 86.73% | 6,051 | 6,977 | 34,814 | 20.04% |
| Ohariu-Belmont | 23.36% | 2,409 | 76.64% | 7,904 | 10,313 | 37,715 | 27.34% |
| Otago | 12.36% | 1,337 | 87.64% | 9,483 | 10,820 | 42,047 | 25.73% |
| Otaki | 16.15% | 1,914 | 83.85% | 9,934 | 11,848 | 40,005 | 29.62% |
| Owairaka | 9.65% | 939 | 90.35% | 8,794 | 9,733 | 37,337 | 26.07% |
| Pakuranga | 11.72% | 1,218 | 88.28% | 9,175 | 10,393 | 38,815 | 26.78% |
| Palmerston North | 12.25% | 1,412 | 87.75% | 10,118 | 11,530 | 38,355 | 30.06% |
| Port Waikato | 8.56% | 688 | 91.44% | 7,351 | 8,039 | 34,068 | 23.60% |
| Rakaia | 17.21% | 1,748 | 82.79% | 8,406 | 10,154 | 38,878 | 26.12% |
| Rangitikei | 12.42% | 1,405 | 87.68% | 9,911 | 11,316 | 38,277 | 29.56% |
| Rimutaka | 13.00% | 1,565 | 87.00% | 10,476 | 12,041 | 36,794 | 32.73% |
| Rodney | 9.89% | 1,156 | 90.11% | 10,530 | 11,686 | 42,522 | 27.48% |
| Rongotai | 17.65% | 1,934 | 82.35% | 9,021 | 10,955 | 40,477 | 27.06% |
| Rotorua | 12.17% | 1,115 | 87.85% | 8,046 | 9,161 | 35,443 | 25.85% |
| Tamaki | 17.98% | 1,659 | 82.02% | 7,567 | 9,226 | 35,924 | 25.68% |
| Taranaki-King Country | 12.49% | 905 | 87.51% | 6,338 | 7,243 | 33,883 | 21.38% |
| Taupo | 13.05% | 998 | 86.95% | 6,647 | 7,645 | 35,412 | 21.59% |
| Tauranga | 11.26% | 1,269 | 88.74% | 10,002 | 11,271 | 43,475 | 25.93% |
| Tukituki | 11.66% | 1,203 | 88.31% | 9,117 | 10,320 | 37,321 | 27.65% |
| Waimakariri | 11.24% | 1,499 | 88.76% | 11,841 | 13,340 | 39,119 | 34.10% |
| Waipareira | 6.32% | 648 | 93.68% | 9,610 | 10,258 | 38,561 | 26.60% |
| Wairarapa | 14.90% | 1,626 | 85.10% | 9,287 | 10,913 | 38,204 | 28.57% |
| Waitakere | 7.41% | 809 | 92.69% | 10,115 | 10,924 | 36,593 | 29.85% |
| Wellington Central | 33.33% | 3,738 | 66.67% | 7,476 | 11,214 | 44,328 | 25.30% |
| West Coast-Tasman | 11.21% | 1,115 | 88.79% | 8,830 | 9,945 | 36,004 | 27.62% |
| Whanganui | 9.06% | 1,098 | 90.94% | 11,022 | 12,120 | 37,954 | 31.93% |
| Whangarei | 9.53% | 1,137 | 90.47% | 10,788 | 11,925 | 38,878 | 30.67% |
| Wigram | 8.08% | 1,139 | 91.92% | 12,952 | 14,091 | 39,983 | 35.24% |
| Te Puku O Te Whenua | 8.19% | 278 | 91.81% | 3,117 | 3,395 | 25,691 | 13.21% |
| Te Tai Hauauru | 7.50% | 266 | 92.50% | 3,280 | 3,546 | 30,916 | 11.47% |
| Te Tai Rawhiti | 7.92% | 281 | 92.08% | 3,269 | 3,550 | 30,097 | 11.80% |
| Te Tai Tokerau | 8.18% | 336 | 91.82% | 3,772 | 4,108 | 30,094 | 13.56% |
| Te Tai Tonga | 6.78% | 316 | 93.22% | 4,342 | 4,658 | 28,564 | 16.31% |

== Aftermath ==
The referendum was rejected with a huge margin, but career firefighter numbers were reduced regardless. There were 1819 career firefighters on 1 January 1995, 1573 in 1998 and 1702 in 2009.
