= 1995 Transnistrian constitutional referendum =

A double referendum was held in Transnistria on 24 December 1995. Voters were asked whether they approved of a new constitution and membership of the Commonwealth of Independent States. The new constitution provided for a parliamentary republic, a bicameral parliament and obligatory referendums for amending sections I, II and IV of the constitution. Both proposals were approved by over 80% of voters. According to an article by the ethnic Russian researcher from Moldova Alla Skvortsova from 2002, "polls and elections in the PMR may to some extent have been rigged".

== Results ==
=== New constitution ===
Choice	Votes	%
For		82.70
Against		17.30
Invalid/blank votes		–
Total		100
Registered voters/turnout		62.70
Source: Direct Democracy

=== CIS membership ===
Choice	Votes	%
For		89.70
Against		10.30
Invalid/blank votes		–
Total		100
Registered voters/turnout		62.70
Source: Direct Democracy
