= 1995 Raleigh mayoral election =

Raleigh mayoral election, 1995
- October 12, 1995
Candidate	Tom Fetzer	Mary Nooe
Party	Republican	Democratic
Popular vote	25,423	16,691
Percentage	60.25%	39.55%
Mayor before election
Tom Fetzer
Republican
Elected mayor
Tom Fetzer
Republican

The Raleigh mayoral election of 1995 was held on October 12, 1995, to elect a Mayor of Raleigh, North Carolina. The election was non-partisan. It was won by Tom Fetzer, who stayed incumbent after beating Mary Nooe. Mary Nooe had been on the city council for 8 years prior to the election.

== Results ==
1997 Raleigh mayoral election
Candidate	Votes	%
Tom Fetzer (incumbent)	25,423	60.25
Mary Nooe	16,691	39.55
Write-ins	85	0.00
Turnout	42,199	%
