= 2001 Green Party of Ontario leadership election =

- November 3, 2001
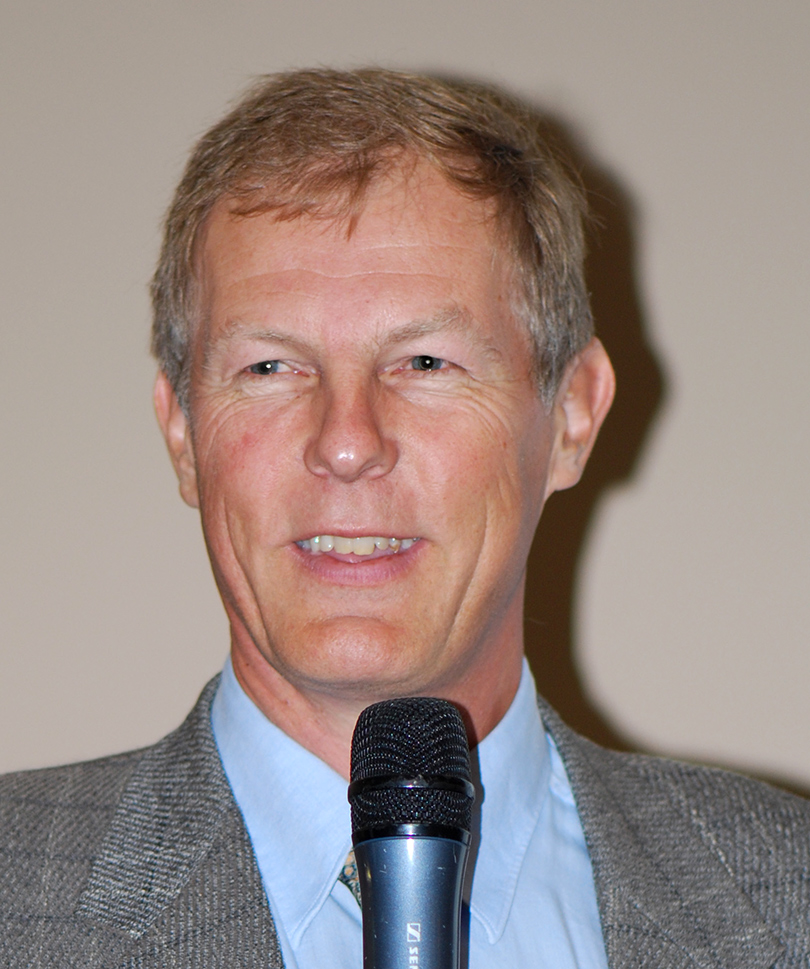
Candidate	Frank de Jong	Judy Greenwood-Speers
Votes	271	Unknown
Result	Winner	Runner-up
Leader before election
Frank de Jong
Elected Leader
Frank de Jong

2001 Green Party of Ontario leadership election
- Date: November 3, 2001
- Convention: election conducted by postal ballot
- Resigning leader: Frank de Jong
- Won by: Frank de Jong
- Ballots: 1
- Candidates: 2

The 2001 Green Party of Ontario leadership election took place November 3, 2001 when Frank de Jong's leadership was challenged by GPO deputy leader Judy Greenwood-Speers of Waterloo, Ontario.

De Jong, who had led the GPO since 1993, received 271 votes and defeated Greenwood-Speers.

== Candidates ==
- Frank de Jong, elementary school teacher and GPO leader since 1993
- Judy Greenwood-Speers, registered nurse, GPO deputy leader
