= By-elections to the 38th Canadian Parliament =

2004–2006 elections for vacant seats

By-elections to the 38th Canadian Parliament were held to fill vacancies in the House of Commons of Canada between the 2004 federal election and the 2006 federal election. The Liberal Party of Canada led a minority government for the entirety of the 38th Canadian Parliament.

Three seats became vacant during the life of the Parliament. One of these vacancies was filled through a by-election, and two seats remained vacant when the 2006 federal election was called.

== Summary ==
Analysis of byelections by turnout and vote share for winning candidate (vs 2004)
| Riding and winning party | | | Turnout | | Vote share for winning candidate | |
| Riding and winning party | | | % | Change (pp) | % | Change (pp) |
|---|---|---|---|---|---|---|
| Labrador | █ Liberal | Hold | 53.44 | 8.62 | 51.48 | -10.75 |

== Overview ==
| By-election | Date | Incumbent | Party | Winner | Party | Cause | Retained |
|---|---|---|---|---|---|---|---|
| Labrador | May 24, 2005 | Lawrence D. O'Brien | Liberal | Todd Russell | Liberal | Death (cancer) | Yes |

== 2005 ==
=== Labrador ===
On December 16, 2004, MP Lawrence O'Brien died of cancer. Prime Minister Paul Martin called a federal by-election for May 24, 2005. There was a possibility the by-election will not be held because of a non-confidence vote the week prior, that would have toppled the government, sending Canadians to the polls, and would have superseded the by-election. However, the motion failed by one vote, ensuring a by-election in Labrador.

==== Issues ====
The seat has traditionally been a Liberal stronghold, and O'Brien always carried the riding with comfortable pluralities. However, the federal Liberals had lost popularity in Atlantic Canada since the 2004 federal election, largely due to disputes with the Progressive Conservative provincial governments of these provinces, especially that of Newfoundland and Labrador over the relationship between offshore petroleum revenues and equalization payments.

Historically, governing parties fare poorly in federal by-elections. However, this by-election was especially significant due to the make-up of the 38th Canadian Parliament. Following the 2004 election, the Liberals combined with the left-leaning New Democratic Party held 154 seats, or exactly half of the 308-seat House of Commons of Canada. Furthermore, with former Liberal MP Carolyn Parrish now expelled from that party, the two parties' combined total (prior to O'Brien's death) had been reduced to 153 (or 152 who are eligible to vote since the Speaker was elected as a Liberal). The Liberals were anxious to retain the seat, as its loss would leave the opposition Conservative Party of Canada or the separatist Bloc Québécois as the only viable partners for the Liberals to get legislation passed in the House. Former Liberal MP David Kilgour had left the party, further reducing its strength.

Since the general election, it had been suggested that the New Democratic Party refrain from contesting by-elections in seats where the Liberals were strong but the NDP are not, to avoid splitting the vote and thus help improve the chances securing a better position for the NDP in the House. Labrador would certainly be a prime example of such a seat - the NDP finished a distant fourth in the 2004 poll. However, historically the NDP has been adamant in contesting all by-elections, and NDP leader Jack Layton showed little interest in any such proposal. The NDP nominated Frances Fry on April 23 feeling it had a chance in this seat due to the Liberal fall in polls and the fact that the provincial NDP had one of its 2 seats in Labrador.

==== Results ====
Canadian federal by-election, 24 May 2005
| Party | Candidate | Votes | % | ±% |
|---|---|---|---|---|
On the death of Lawrence O'Brien, 16 December 2004
| Liberal | Todd Russell | 5,438 | 51.48% | -10.75% |
| Conservative | Graham Letto | 3,415 | 32.33% | +16.56% |
| New Democratic | Frances Fry | 1,045 | 9.89% | +0.25% |
| Independent | Ern Condon | 598 | 5.66% | -4.69% |
| Green | Jason Crummey | 68 | 0.64% | -1.37% |
| Majority | | 2,023 | 19.1% | |
| Turnout | | 10,564 | 54.1% | +9.3% |
| Liberal hold. | | Swing | -13.6% | |

In the end, the Liberals picked up an easy victory, as expected, but while their actual vote total did not go down by much, their percentage of the vote went down over 10 points from the previous election as turnout was over 9% more than in the 2004 election. This high turnout is virtually unheard of for by-elections which normally have extremely poor turnouts. The additional voters appear to have been brought out by the tense national political situation and mostly voted for the Conservatives who picked up nearly 17 points and the New Democrats who also increased their vote total.

== See also ==
- List of federal by-elections in Canada
