= 1995 Moldovan local elections =

Moldova Elections

Local elections were held in Moldova on April 16, 1995. A detailed report on elections is published by IFES (International Foundation for Electoral Systems).

The Agrarian Party of Moldova (PAM) won these elections.
