= 1995 Louisiana lieutenant gubernatorial election =

- October 21, 1995 (first round); November 18, 1995 (runoff)
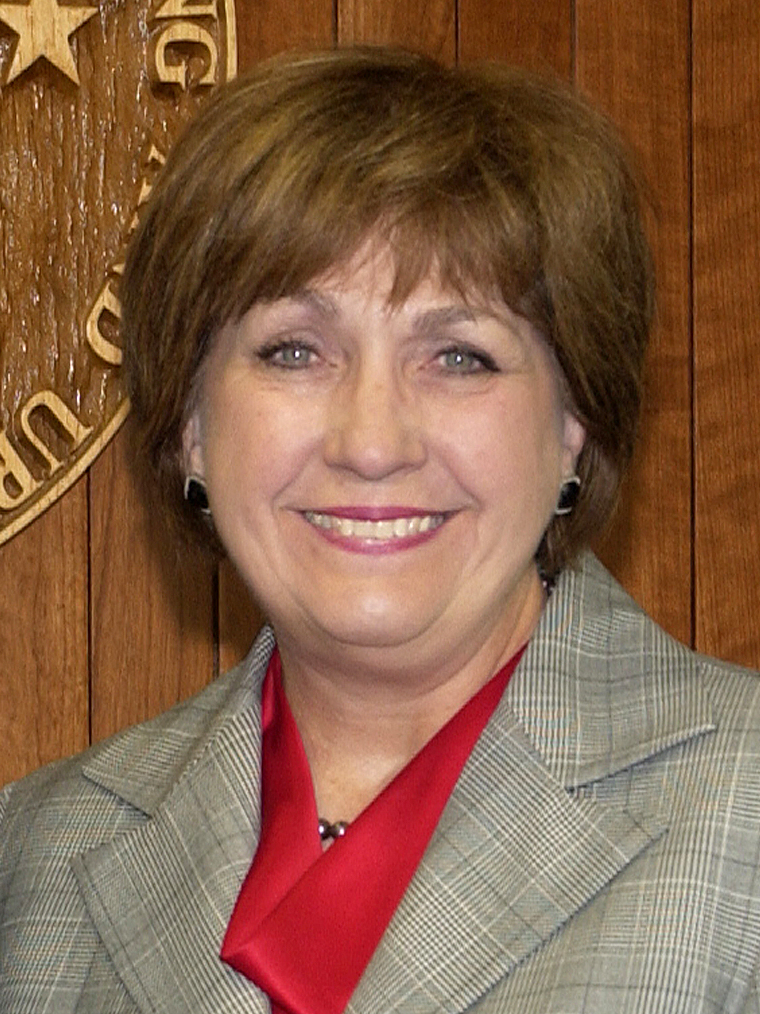

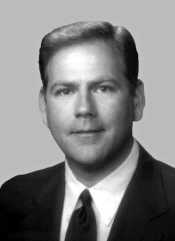

Candidate	Kathleen Blanco	Suzanne Mayfield Krieger	Chris John
Party	Democratic	Republican	Democratic
First round	590,410; 43.68%	211,520; 15.65%	206,915; 15.31%
Runoff	964,559; 65.25%	513,613; 34.75%	Eliminated
Candidate	Greg Marcantel	Charles S. Blaylock
Party	Republican	Republican
First round	76,488; 5.66%	74,366; 5.50%
Runoff	Eliminated	Eliminated
- Blanco: 20–30% 30–40% 40–50% 50–60% 60–70% Krieger: 40–50% John: 30–40% 40–50% Marcantel: 40–50% Blanco: 50–60% 60–70% 70–80% 80–90% Krieger: 50–60%
Lieutenant Governor before election
Melinda Schwegmann
Democratic
Elected Lieutenant Governor
Kathleen Blanco
Democratic

The 1995 Louisiana lieutenant gubernatorial election was held on November 18, 1995, in order to elect the lieutenant governor of Louisiana. Incumbent Democratic member of the Louisiana Public Service Commission from the 2nd district Kathleen Blanco defeated incumbent Republican member of the Louisiana House of Representatives Suzanne Mayfield Krieger in the Runoff election.

== Background ==
Elections in Louisiana—with the exception of U.S. presidential elections—follow a variation of the open primary system called the jungle primary or the nonpartisan blanket primary. Candidates of any and all parties are listed on one ballot; voters need not limit themselves to the candidates of one party. Unless one candidate takes more than 50% of the vote in the first round, a run-off election is then held between the top two candidates, who may in fact be members of the same party. Texas uses this same format for its special elections. In this election, the first round of voting was held on October 21, 1995. The runoff was held on November 18, 1995.

== Primary election ==
On election day, October 21, 1995, incumbent Democratic member of the Louisiana Public Service Commission from the 2nd district Kathleen Blanco and incumbent Republican member of the Louisiana House of Representatives Suzanne Mayfield Krieger received the most votes and thus advanced to a runoff election on November 18.

=== Results ===
Louisiana lieutenant gubernatorial primary election, 1995
Party	Candidate	Votes	%
Democratic	Kathleen Blanco	590,410	43.68
Republican	Suzanne Mayfield Krieger	211,520	15.65
Democratic	Chris John	206,915	15.31
Republican	Greg Marcantel	76,488	5.66
Republican	Charles S. Blaylock	74,366	5.50
Independent	Eric Guirard	66,947	4.95
Democratic	Robert Patrick	40,210	2.98
Democratic	Jay Chevalier	27,900	2.06
Democratic	Antoine M. Saacks Jr.	22,908	1.70
Independent	R.A. Galan	18,630	1.38
Democratic	Julius Leahman	15,461	1.13
Total votes		1,351,755	100.00

== Runoff election ==
On election day, November 18, 1995, incumbent Democratic member of the Louisiana Public Service Commission from the 2nd district Kathleen Blanco defeated incumbent Republican member of the Louisiana House of Representatives Suzanne Mayfield Krieger by a margin of 450,946 votes, thereby retaining Democratic control over the office of lieutenant governor. Blanco was sworn in as the 50th Lieutenant Governor of Louisiana on January 8, 1996.

=== Results ===
Louisiana lieutenant gubernatorial runoff election, 1995
Party	Candidate	Votes	%
Democratic	Kathleen Blanco	964,559	65.25
Republican	Suzanne Mayfield Krieger	513,613	34.75
Total votes		1,478,172	100.00
Democratic hold			
