= 1995 Moroccan constitutional referendum =

15 September 1995

Results
Choice	Votes	%
Yes	8,080,866	99.60%
No	32,294	0.40%
Valid votes	8,113,160	99.48%
Invalid or blank votes	42,199	0.52%
Total votes	8,155,359	100.00%
Registered voters/turnout	11,613,119	70.23%

A constitutional referendum was held in Morocco on 15 September 1995. The amendment was made in order to change the date on which the annual Finance Act must be passed. It was approved by 99.6% of voters, with a 70.2% turnout.

== Results ==
Choice	Votes	%
For	8,080,866	99.6
Against	32,294	0.4
Invalid/blank votes	42,199	-
Total	8,155,359	100
Source: Nohlen et al.
