= 1995 Progressive Conservative Party of New Brunswick leadership election =

- Date: May 13, 1995
- Convention: Fredericton, New Brunswick
- Resigning leader: Dennis Cochrane
- Won by: Bernard Valcourt
- Ballots: 1
- Candidates: 3

The Progressive Conservative Party of New Brunswick held a leadership election in 1995 to replace its outgoing leader Dennis Cochrane. The winner was former federal cabinet minister Bernard Valcourt, who went on to win the riding of Edmundston in the 1995 general election.

The candidates were Bathurst lawyer John Hazen, Riverview lawyer Scott MacGregor and Valcourt. Another prospective candidate, Shediac mayor Michel Leger, dropped out well ahead of the convention after a 1990 court ruling surfaced in which a judge said Leger had made a "fraudulent omission and misrepresentation" in a land transfer made to obtain fire insurance for a property.

== Results ==
1995 PCNB leadership result
Candidate	Votes	%
Bernard Valcourt	944	67.1
Scott MacGregor	416	29.6
John Hazen	47	3.3
