= School District 87 Stikine =

School district in British Columbia, Canada

Location
- Dease Lake Dease Lake, Atlin, Lower Post, and Telegraph Creek in Northwest Canada

District information
- Superintendent: Katherine McIntosh
- Schools: 4
- Budget: CA$5.4 million

Students and staff
- Students: 160

Other information
- Website: www.sd87.bc.ca

School District 87 Stikine is a school district in the province of British Columbia, Canada. It covers the northwest corner of the province along the Alaska and Yukon borders. This includes the communities of Dease Lake, Lower Post, Telegraph Creek, and Atlin.

Stikine is one of the 14 districts in the geographically dispersed Northern Region of British Columbia school districts. It is the smallest school district in British Columbia by enrollment, but covers one of the largest areas.

== Schools ==
School	Location	Grades
Atlin School	Atlin	K-12
Dease Lake School	Dease Lake	K-12
Denetia Elementary School	Lower Post	K-7
Tahltan School	Telegraph Creek	K-9

== See also ==
- List of school districts in British Columbia
