= School District 10 Arrow Lakes =

School district in British Columbia, Canada

- School District 10 Arrow Lakes Logo

Location
- Nakusp Nakusp, New Denver, Burton, Edgewood in Kootenays Canada

District information
- Superintendent: Peter Dubinsky
- Schools: 5
- Budget: CA$7.5 million

Students and staff
- Students: 648

Other information
- Website: www.sd10.bc.ca

School District 10 Arrow Lakes is a school district in British Columbia. The districts 5 schools are located in the communities of Nakusp, New Denver, Edgewood and Burton.

== Schools ==
School	Location	Grades
Arrow Lakes Distributed Learning	-	K-12
Nakusp Secondary School	Nakusp	8-12
Nakusp Elementary School	Nakusp	K-7
Lucerne Elem-Secondary School	New Denver	K-12
Edgewood Elementary School	Edgewood	K-7
Burton Elementary School	Burton	K-7

== See also ==
- List of school districts in British Columbia
