= Elections in Canada =

Canada holds elections for legislatures or governments in several jurisdictions: for the federal (national) government, provincial and territorial governments, and municipal governments. Elections are also held for self-governing First Nations and for many other public and private organizations including corporations and trade unions. Municipal elections can also be held for both upper-tier (regional municipality or county) and lower-tier (town, village, or city) governments.

Formal elections have occurred in Canada since at least 1792, when both Upper Canada and Lower Canada had their first elections. Canada's first recorded election was held in Halifax in 1758 to elect the 1st General Assembly of Nova Scotia.

All Canadian citizens aged 18 or older may register and vote in federal elections. Elections for other levels of government may have additional residency or ownership requirements. For example, some municipalities allow both residents and non-resident landowners to vote.

The most recent Canadian federal election occurred on April 28, 2025. The Constitution limits terms for Parliament and all provincial legislatures to five years; current legislation fixes terms at four years at the federal level and in every province except Nova Scotia. However, as in other Westminster systems, a parliamentary term may still be ended early due to a successful vote of no confidence or a snap election called by the ruling government. Though not impossible, there have never been two general elections in the same calendar year, either at the federal level or in any province or territory.

Although only the first-past-the-post voting is used currently in federal and all provincial elections in Canada, federal elections in the 1867-1970 period and elections in every province (except Quebec) used other election systems and multi-member districts at one time or another between 1867 and 1996. Through the years, Canadians have seen numerous instances of electoral reform and attempted electoral reform. Alberta was the first province to elect all its MLAs using non-FPTP systems, in 1926. Also recent attempts to change from first past the post to a different electoral system by referendum failed (or were ignored) in B.C. in 2005 and 2018, P.E.I. in 2005, 2016, and 2019, Ontario in 2007, and Yukon in 2025. Referendums on electoral reform have been proposed or cancelled in other provinces.

== Latest election ==
Summary of the 2025 Canadian federal election
Party	Party leader	Candidates	Seats					Popular vote				
Party	Party leader	Candidates	2021	Dissol.	2025	Change from 2021	% seats	Votes	Vote change	%	pp change	% where running
Liberal	Mark Carney	342 (Note: In the riding of Ponoka—Didsbury, Zarnab Zafar was endorsed by the Liberal Party, but, due to a clerical error with Elections Canada, her party affiliation was not registered.)	160	152	169	▲9	49.27%	8,595,488	▲3,038,859	43.76%	▲11.14pp	43.91%
Conservative	Pierre Poilievre	342 (Note: In the riding of Québec Centre, Conservative candidate Chanie Thériault had her paperwork rejected by Elections Canada; the party did not specify the reason(s).)	119	120	144	▲25	41.98%	8,113,484	▲2,366,074	41.31%	▲7.57pp	41.43%
Bloc Québécois	Yves-François Blanchet	78	32	33	22	▼10	6.41%	1,236,349	▼65,276	6.29%	▼1.35pp	27.65%
New Democratic	Jagmeet Singh	342 (Note: In the riding of South Shore—St. Margarets, NDP candidate Brendan Mosher dropped out of the race for personal reasons. Hayden Henderson was endorsed by the NDP, but was listed on the ballot as an Independent candidate.)	25	24	7	▼18	2.04%	1,234,673	▼1,801,675	6.29%	▼11.53pp	6.30%
Green	Elizabeth May & Jonathan Pedneault	232	2	2	1	▼1	0.29%	238,892	▼158,096	1.22%	▼1.11pp	1.75%
People's	Maxime Bernier	247	–	–	–	Steady	–	136,977	▼704,016	0.70%	▼4.24pp	0.94%
Independent and No Affiliation		177 (Note: 159 Independents, 18 No Affiliation; 83 (74 Ind., 9 NA) participated in the Longest Ballot Committee protest in the riding of Carleton.)	–	3	–	Steady	–	39,498	▲7,017	0.20%	▲0.01pp	0.31%
Christian Heritage	Rodney L. Taylor	32	–	–	–	Steady	–	10,065	▲1,080	0.05%	Steady	0.46%
Rhinoceros	Chinook B. Blais-Leduc	29	–	–	–	Steady	–	7,063	▲978	0.04%	Steady	0.41%
United (Note: Name changed to Reforge Party in 2026.)	Grant S. Abraham	16	New	–	–	New	–	6,061	New	0.03%	New	0.57%
Libertarian (D)	Jacques Y. Boudreau	16	–	–	–	Steady	–	5,561	▲796	0.03%	Steady	0.57%
Marxist–Leninist	Anna Di Carlo	35	–	–	–	Steady	–	4,996	▲464	0.03%	Steady	0.25%
Communist	Elizabeth Rowley	24	–	–	–	Steady	–	4,685	▼15	0.02%	▼0.01pp	0.36%
Centrist	A. Q. Rana	19	–	–	–	Steady	–	3,314	▲2,666	0.02%	▲0.02pp	0.31%
Canadian Future	Dominic Cardy	19	New	–	–	New	–	3,123	New	0.02%	New	0.27%
Animal Protection	Liz White	7	–	–	–	Steady	–	1,301	▼1,245	0.01%	Steady	0.32%
Marijuana (D)	Blair T. Longley	2	–	–	–	Steady	–	133	▼1,898	0.00%	▼0.01pp	0.09%
Vacant				4	—N/a							
Total valid votes								19,641,663	▲2,727,388	100.00%	–	–
Total rejected ballots								169,857	▼5,711	0.86%	▼0.16pp	–
Total		1,959	338	338	343	▲5	100.00%			100.00%	–	100.00%
Electorate (eligible voters)/turnout												–
Note: Official results with two judicial recounts to be completed.
Source(s): Elections Canada (D) indicates a party deregistered before the next election

== Electoral regulatory bodies ==
Elections in Canada (federal, provincial, or Territorial) are organized by their respective election regulatory bodies as follows:

Canadian electoral regulatory bodies
Jurisdiction	Electoral regulatory body (year established)	Periodic oversight of legislative seat contests in any given election	Date of most recent major election	Next major election scheduled for / required by
(Canada) Federal	Elections Canada (1920)	Lower house: All 343 seats in the House of Commons of Canada (every 4 years, on the third Monday of October)	April 28, 2025	October 15, 2029
British Columbia	Elections BC (1995)	Unicameral: All 93 seats in the Legislative Assembly of British Columbia (every 4 years, on the third Saturday of October)	October 24, 2026	October 19, 2030
Alberta	Elections Alberta (1977)	Unicameral: All 87 seats in the Legislative Assembly of Alberta (every 4 years, on the third Monday of October, notwithstanding exceptions)	May 29, 2023	October 18, 2027
Saskatchewan	Elections Saskatchewan (1959)	Unicameral: All 61 seats in the Legislative Assembly of Saskatchewan (every 4 years, on the last Monday of October)	October 28, 2024	October 30, 2028
Manitoba	Elections Manitoba (1980)	Unicameral: All 57 seats in the Legislative Assembly of Manitoba (every 4 years, on the first Tuesday of October)	October 3, 2023	October 5, 2027
Ontario	Elections Ontario (1919)	Unicameral: All 124 seats in the Legislative Assembly of Ontario (every 5 years)	February 27, 2025	April 11, 2030
Quebec	Élections Québec (1945)	Unicameral: All 127 seats in the National Assembly of Quebec (every 4 years, on the first Monday of October)	October 5, 2026	October 7, 2030
Nova Scotia	Elections Nova Scotia (1991)	Unicameral: All 55 seats in the Nova Scotia House of Assembly (every 5 years)	November 26, 2024	December 7, 2029
New Brunswick	Elections New Brunswick (1967)	Unicameral: All 49 seats in the Legislative Assembly of New Brunswick (every 4 years, on the third Monday of October)	October 21, 2024	October 23, 2028
Newfoundland and Labrador	Elections Newfoundland & Labrador (1991)	Unicameral: All 40 seats in the Newfoundland and Labrador House of Assembly (every 4 years, on the second Tuesday of October)	October 14, 2025	October 9, 2029
Prince Edward Island	Elections Prince Edward Island (1965)	Unicameral: All 27 seats in the Legislative Assembly of Prince Edward Island (every 4 years, on the first Monday of October)	April 3, 2023	October 4, 2027
Northwest Territories	Elections NWT (1997)	Unicameral: All 19 seats in the Legislative Assembly of the Northwest Territories (every 4 years, on the first Tuesday of October)	November 14, 2023	October 5, 2027
Yukon	Elections Yukon (2002)	Unicameral: All 21 seats in the Yukon Legislative Assembly (every 4 years, on the first Monday of November)	November 3, 2025	November 5, 2029
Nunavut	Elections Nunavut (2003)	Unicameral: All 22 seats in the Legislative Assembly of Nunavut (every 4 years, on the last Monday of October)	October 27, 2025	October 29, 2029

== National (federal) elections ==
The Parliament of Canada has two chambers: the House of Commons has 343 members, elected for a maximum five-year term in single-seat electoral districts through first-past-the-post voting, and the Senate has 105 members appointed by the governor general on the advice of the prime minister. Senators are given permanent terms (up to age 75) and thus often serve much longer than the prime minister who was primarily responsible for their appointment.

National elections are governed by the Canada Elections Act and administered by an independent agency, Elections Canada. Canadians vote for their choice for local Member of Parliament (MP), who will hold a seat in the House of Commons. Under first-past-the-post voting, the plurality winner is elected and then votes as the named representative of that specific constituency in the House of Commons. But in practice usually voting in line with other members of their party caucus in the House of Commons.

The leader of the party most likely to hold the confidence of the House of Commons becomes the prime minister. They stay in power as long as they hold the support of a majority of MPs in the House of Commons.

Most MPs are members of a political party, although candidates may stand for election and be elected as independents unaffiliated with any political party. The practice of listing candidates' party affiliation on ballots began with the 1972 election. Since then, the Canada Elections Act has required that a local candidate running under a party label be directly approved by the leader of their affiliated party, effectively centralizing the candidate nomination process.

Once MPs are elected, sitting members of parliament are permitted to "cross the floor" switching party affiliation without having to first resign and restand for office under their new affiliation. Sitting members may also be dismissed from or voluntarily leave their party and become independents. By-elections (casual vacancies) also may change the party seat counts. As a result, the distribution of seats by party affiliation often fluctuates between elections.

Although several parties are typically represented in parliament, Canada historically has had two dominant political parties: the Liberal Party and the Conservative Party, which was preceded by the Progressive Conservative Party and the Conservative Party (1867–1942). However, in the 2011 federal election, the New Democratic Party of Canada (NDP), took the second largest caucus. While other parties have sometimes formed the Official Opposition, the 41st Parliament (2011–2015) was the first in which the Liberals did not form either the government or the Official Opposition.

Every government since Confederation has been either Liberal or Conservative with the exception of the Unionist government during World War I, which was a coalition of Conservatives and some Liberals. Most have been majority governments (one party holding a majority of seats in the House of Commons, even if not holding a majority of votes cast in the last election). Many times due to strong showing by "third parties", no party (neither the Liberals nor the Conservatives) captured a majority of seats in the House of Commons, thus producing a minority government. Faced with such a situation, the Liberals and the NDP signed a Confidence and Supply Agreement in 2022, the first of its kind in Canada.

If a government loses a confidence motion, traditionally the prime minister asks the governor general to call an election and traditionally the governor general follows that advice. However, the viceroy's compliance is not assured—the governor general has the right to seek out another party leader who is thought to command the confidence of the House (support from majority of the MPs) and ask them to form a government. This happened in 1926 and is referred to as the King–Byng Affair.

Strictly speaking, the five-year time limitation is applied to the life of the parliament or assembly in question — that body is not deemed to have been formed until the return of the writs and ceases to exist the moment it is dissolved. It is therefore legally possible for slightly more than five years to elapse between election days, as was the case between the 1930 and 1935 elections. As well, under emergency situations it is possible to extend the life of the government as Prime Minister Borden did - the 1917 election took place six years and three months after the previous election.

Although the law allows for a five-year gap between election and dissolution, there have been in fact only two gaps since 1974 that approached the five-year limit: 1974-1979 and 1988-1993. When no party secures a majority of seats, it is common for a government to last just a couple years or less. (The 1979 government of Joe Clark lasted just six months.) As well, a party with a majority of seats may decide to call an election early, hoping to win more seats and fearing that postponement will lower its chances for reelection. At the federal level, there have been eight general elections since 2000.

It is also possible for a general election to be delayed should Canada be embroiled in a war or insurrection. This provision was enacted to allow Prime Minister Sir Robert Borden to delay a federal election for about a year during the First World War. Since then, the provision has only been used twice, both times by provincial governments — Ontario delayed an election for a few weeks in the year following the Armistice in 1918. Saskatchewan was the only jurisdiction to delay a general election by more than a year, due to World War II, but held an election in 1944, one week more than six years after the previous vote.

The Canadian population generally misunderstands the electoral system, with most citizens believing they vote to directly elect the prime minister; that the majority choice is elected in each district; that a majority government in the House of Commons had support of a majority of voters; that a party with the most seats in the House of Commons has the right to control the House of Commons. In 2008, Conservative politicians tried to use the public's misconception of how governments are formed to defend its decision to maintain its grip on power despite not having a majority of seats in the House of Commons. (Note: For example, during the paliarmentary dispute in 2008, the Cabinet tried to convince the public that its attempt to prorogue Parliament to avoid a motion of no confidence brought by the opposition parties was legitimate, saying the Canadian parliamentary system determined the party holding the most seats had "won" the election.) Attempts to correct erroneous claims are often delegitimized as politically motivated.

=== Results ===
Hugo Cyr found in 2017 that the Canadian media's habit of announcing, before polls close on election nights, which party will form the next government misrepresents the process of the governor general or lieutenant governors appointing cabinet or executive councils, respectively, "as automatic, merely a matter of arithmetic".

The leader of a party that secures a majority of seats in the House of Commons or other legislative assembly is the obvious choice to be prime minister or premier. And when no party has majority of seats, the leader of the political party that wins the plurality of seats in the elected body is typically called by the governor general or lieutenant governor to form a government. But this is not a requirement. The relevant viceroy must appoint as head of government whoever can command the confidence of the elected house. This means a party that does not win the majority of seats, or even the plurality of seats in an election, can still govern if it allies itself with another party or other parties in the same legislative chamber, so as to, combined, hold the majority of seats, whether forming a coalition government or not. Only a few coalition governments have existed in Canadian history. To produce a working majority, Liberals and the NDP signed a Confidence and Supply Agreement in 2022, the first of its kind in Canada, which allowed the Liberal minority government to rule for longer than most minority governments have done so historically. In many cases, minority governments have been sustained in power due to passage of bills by ad hoc case-by-case multi-party support, at least for a couple years.

Due to many votes not being used to elect the winner in each of the 340 or so ridings in Canada, a party's share of seats in the House of Commons may vary considerably from the party's share of votes cast. Smaller parties have almost always received fewer seats than their due share. Disproportional artificially-produced one-party sweep of a province's seats is often produced. On occasion a party with more votes may receive fewer seats than a party with fewer votes. Such situations lead some to call for electoral reform and proportional representation. ("Adopted and attempted electoral reform" is discussed below.)

=== Fixed dates ===
Section 4 of the Canadian Charter of Rights and Freedoms limits the term of any federal, provincial, or territorial parliament to a maximum of five years after the return of the writs of the last election. On November 6, 2006, the Parliament of Canada amended the Canada Elections Act to introduce a requirement that each federal general election must take place on the third Monday in October in the fourth calendar year after the previous poll, starting with October 19, 2009. Since then, all provinces and territories enacted similar legislation establishing fixed election dates, but in 2025 Nova Scotia and Ontario repealed their laws.

These laws, nevertheless, do not curtail the power of the governor general or a provincial lieutenant governor to dissolve a legislature prior to the fixed election date on the advice of the relevant first minister or due to a motion of no confidence.

Even where such legislation is in effect, voluntary variation is possible.

=== By-elections and referendums ===
By-elections can be held between general elections when seats become vacant through the resignation or death of a member. The date of the by-election is determined by the governor general, who must call it between 11 and 180 days after being notified of the seat vacancy by the Speaker of the House of Commons.

The federal government can also hold nationwide referendums on major issues. The last federal referendum was held in 1992, on proposed constitutional changes in the Charlottetown Accord. On occasion, one particular issue will dominate an election, and the election will in a sense be a virtual referendum. The most recent instance of this was the 1988 election, which was considered by most parties to be a referendum on free trade with the United States.

=== Qualifications ===
Every Canadian citizen 18 years of age or older has the right to vote, except for the Chief Electoral Officer. Previously, section 4 of the Canada Elections Act prohibited inmates serving a sentence of at least two years from voting, but on October 31, 2002, the Supreme Court of Canada ruled in Sauvé v. Canada that such a law violated the section 3 of the Charter, and was rendered of no force or effect until its repeal in 2018 by the Elections Modernization Act. Section 4 also forbade the Assistant Chief Electoral Officer from voting. Following the 2015 Canadian federal election, the Chief Electoral Officer noted in his recommendation report that this appointed position lacked any specific mandate, and had not been filled since 2001; it was subsequently eliminated in the Elections Modernization Act.

The federal National Register of Electors is updated to reflect various changes in the Canadian population, including address changes, reaching voting age, naturalization, and death. Every year, about 3,000,000 address changes are processed by Elections Canada from information obtained from the Canada Revenue Agency, Canada Post (via the National Change of Address service), provincial and territorial motor vehicle registrars, and provincial electoral agencies with permanent voters lists. Every year, about 400,000 Canadians reach voting age and 200,000 Canadians die, resulting in changes to the National Register of Electors based on information obtained from the Canada Revenue Agency, provincial and territorial motor vehicle registrars, and provincial electoral agencies with permanent voters lists. Additionally, over 150,000 individuals a year become naturalized Canadians, and are added to the National Register of Electors by Elections Canada based on information obtained from Citizenship and Immigration Canada.

=== Canadian citizens abroad ===
The Supreme Court of Canada's 2019 decision in Frank v Canada (AG) ruled that non-resident citizens have the right to vote regardless of time living outside of Canada.

While Section Three of the Canadian Charter of Rights and Freedoms provides that "every citizen of Canada has the right to vote", in practice only those citizens 18 years of age or older who resided in Canada or had been abroad for fewer than five years were eligible to vote in federal elections from 1993 to 2019. The five-year limit was originally enacted as part of Bill C-114, An Act to Amend the Canada Elections Act, in 1993; these amendments extended the special ballot to certain prisoners, and Canadians "living or travelling" abroad. Exemptions to the five-year limit existed for members of the Canadian Armed Forces, employees of the federal or a provincial government stationed abroad, employees of certain international organizations, and their cohabitants.

Jean-Pierre Kingsley, then the Chief Electoral Officer of Canada for 15 years, explicitly recommended in his 2005 official post-election report that Parliament remove the five-year limit by amendment, but no action was taken.

In May 2014, the Ontario Superior Court of Justice ruled in favour of Canadian expatriates Gillian Frank and Jamie Duong's claim that the five-year limit was an unconstitutional restriction on the right to vote, in violation of the Charter of Rights and Freedoms, leading to a period of fourteen months during which all Canadian expatriates could apply to be on the register of electors. However, the decision was reversed 2–1 on appeal at the Court of Appeal for Ontario on July 20, 2015, in a judicial opinion citing Canada's history of using a residence-based electoral district system and a justification based on social contract theory, which held that the five-year limit was a permissible limitation of the constitutional right to vote under Section One. In response to the appellate court ruling, Elections Canada implemented changes in August 2015 to require expatriates already on the register to declare an intended date of return. The decision from the Court of Appeal was subsequently appealed to the Supreme Court of Canada, which announced on April 14, 2016, that it would hear the case. The court ultimately overturned the appellate court's decision, with the majority finding that "the disenfranchisement of long-term non-resident citizens not only denies them a fundamental democratic right, but also comes at the expense of their self-worth and their dignity."

=== Length of election campaigns ===
The length of election campaigns can vary, but under the Elections Act, the minimum length of a campaign is 36 days and the maximum length of the campaign is 50 days. Section 5 of the Charter also requires that the Parliament sit at least once every twelve months; therefore, a campaign would have to conclude in time for returns to be completed and parliament to be called into session within twelve months of the previous sitting. The federal election date must be set on a Monday (or Tuesday if the Monday is a statutory holiday).

The first two elections, the 1867 election and the 1872 election, took place over several weeks.

The 1872 election was both the second shortest and the longest campaign in history. Parliament was dissolved on July 8, 1872, while the writ was dropped on July 15, 1872. Voting occurred from July 20 to October 12. Therefore, the campaign started 12 days after dissolution of Parliament and 5 days after the writ, and was concluded 96 days (13 weeks plus 5 days) after dissolution and 89 days after the writ.

Every subsequent election has occurred on a single day. Of these elections, the longest election campaign, in terms of days from dissolution to election day, was that of 1926 election, following the King–Byng Affair, which lasted 74 days.

In terms of days from writ to election day, the longest campaign had been the 1980 election, which lasted 66 days. It was surpassed by the 2015 election, which was 78 days long from writ to election day, making it the longest campaign for a one-day election, exceeded in length only by that of 1872.

Prior to the adoption of the minimum of 36 days in law, there were six elections that lasted shorter periods of time. The last of these was the 1904 election which occurred many decades before the minimum was imposed.

In practice, the prime minister will generally keep a campaign as brief as is legal and feasible, because spending by parties is strictly limited by the Elections Act. The maximum spending by each party is increased by 1/37th of the maximum for each day that the campaign exceeds 37 days. The 1997, 2000 and 2004 elections were all of the minimum 36 days in length which has led to a common misconception that elections must be 36 days long. However, prior to 1997, elections averaged much longer: aside from the 47-day campaign for the 1993 election and the 51-day campaign for the 1988 Election, the shortest election period after World War II was 57 days and many were over 60 days in length.

Much speculation had surrounded how long the campaign for the 39th federal election would be in 2006, especially as it became certain the election would be called in the weeks preceding Christmas 2005. The government of Joe Clark, which fell on December 13, 1979, recommended a campaign of 66 days for the resulting election, and nothing legal barred a similarly lengthened campaign. In the end, the 2006 election was called on November 29, 2005, for January 23, 2006 — making a 55-day-long campaign.

== Provincial and territorial ==
=== System ===
All of Canada's provinces and territories use the same plurality voting system used in federal elections (First-past-the-post voting). However, since elections are monitored and organized by an independent provincial and territorial election commission, a province may legally change its electoral system should its parliament wish to do so. This would not require permission from the federal government or the Parliament of Canada. Federal elections formerly used a mixture of first-past the-post and plurality block voting; provincial elections formerly used a variety of electoral methods See "Electoral reform" below.

In the ten provinces and Yukon, elections are contested by candidates either representing political parties or running as independents. Territorial elections in the Northwest Territories and Nunavut are held on a fully non-partisan basis, due to those territories' use of a consensus government model.

=== Parties ===
All Canadian provinces and Yukon, have electoral systems dominated by major political parties. In most provinces the leading parties are the same parties prominent at the federal level. However, the provincial party may or may not have an official affiliation with the federal party of the same name. Thus, names of provincial parties can sometimes be misleading when associating a provincial party with a national party, although the respective ideologies are usually fairly similar.

The Conservative Party of Canada has no provincial wings and none of the current provincial Progressive Conservative Parties are formally linked with the federal party as they all predate the 2003 establishment of the federal party, which resulted in the formal disbanding of the Progressive Conservative Party of Canada. Some provincial parties (such as Alberta) formally broke off links with the federal party prior to the merger.

In Alberta and Quebec, the provincial Liberal parties are independent of the Liberal Party of Canada, while in the other provinces, the provincial Liberal parties are autonomous entities that retain formal links with the federal party.

All provincial wings of the New Democratic Party are fully integrated with the federal party, and members of the provincial party are automatically also members of the federal party. The Green Party has provincial counterparts that are directly affiliated but do not share membership or organizational structure and support.

In Saskatchewan and Yukon, the political parties, the Saskatchewan Party and the Yukon Party, respectively, have no federal counterpart, although they are both ideologically conservative.

=== Results ===
The following table summarizes the results of the most recent provincial and territorial elections. A link to complete lists for each province and territory is below. The winning party is indicated in bold and by the coloured bar at the left of the table.

This table shows the party standings as a result of the most recent election, and not the current representation in legislatures; refer to the articles on the individual houses for the current state.

Province or territory	Date of most recent election	Progressive Conservative	Liberal	New Democrat	Green	Other Conservative Party	Other	Total seats
Yukon	November 3, 2025		1^{2}	6		14 (Yukon Party)		21
Nunavut	October 27, 2025						22^{1}	22
Newfoundland & Labrador	October 14, 2025	21	15	2			2 (Independent)	40
Ontario	February 27, 2025	80	14^{2}	27	2		1 (Independent)	124
Nova Scotia	November 26, 2024	43	2	9			1 (Independent)	55
Saskatchewan	October 28, 2024			27		34 (Saskatchewan Party)		61
New Brunswick	October 21, 2024	16	31		2			49
British Columbia	October 24, 2026			27	2	64 (BC Conservatives)		93
Northwest Territories	November 14, 2023						19^{1}	19
Manitoba	October 3, 2023	22	1^{2}	34				57
Alberta	May 29, 2023			38		49 (United Conservative Party)		87
Prince Edward Island	April 3, 2023	22	3		2			27
Quebec	October 5, 2026		40^{2}			19 (Conservative Party of Quebec)	59 (Parti Québécois) 9 (Québec Solidaire)	127

For lists of general elections in each province and territory, see the infobox at the bottom of the article.

^{1}Note: Nunavut does not have political parties, and political parties in the Northwest Territories were disbanded in 1905. MLAs in both territories are elected as independents and the legislatures function under a consensus government model.

^{2}Note: Provincial Liberal parties that are not affiliated with the federal Liberal Party of Canada.

== Municipal ==
Municipal elections are held in Canada for the election of local governments. Most provinces hold all of their municipal elections on the same date. The mayor is elected in a city-wide contest. Councillors (or aldermen) are elected through either ward or at-large systems, every two, three or four years, depending on the province. Plurality block voting is used in at-large elections and where wards elect multiple members; otherwise First past the post is used. (London, Ontario did adopt Instant-runoff voting but has been banned from using that system.)

A minority of locations in Canada have local political parties or election slates, while most locations elect only independents, or where the candidate has party ties, no party identification is allowed on the ballot.

== Adopted and attempted electoral reform ==
By one count, at the provincial level there have been ten instances of electoral reform in Canadian history. All of them were achieved by passage of normal legislation, without referendum. There have been no instances in Canadian history of electoral reform being achieved after the holding of a referendum.

Reforms and attempted reforms are outlined below.

=== Switch to secret voting and other reforms ===
The move away from oral voting to the "Australian ballot" freed the voter to vote as he or she pleased. It was done at different times in different parts of Canada. New Brunswick adopted secret ballots in 1855; Ontario in 1874; federal elections in 1878.

Holding the elections in all districts at the same time calmed elections and prevented some forms of fraud. Ontario provincial elections and federal elections adopted this in mid-1870s.

Using a non-partisan commission to draw up districts was intended to limit partisan redistricting (gerrymandering). Manitoba established the first such commission in the 1950s. Canada's first independent federal boundary commission was established by the Electoral Boundaries Readjustment Act in November 1964. The use of city-wide multi-member provincial districts in Edmonton and Calgary from the 1920s to 1950s prevented gerrymandering as city boundaries, not arbitrary politically-driven boundaries, were used.

Other reforms that have been achieved concerned extension to the franchise, the right to vote. In some provinces at one time, only property owners were allowed to vote. The vote was extended to women and to certain races or ethnicities at various times, such as the 1921 Canadian election. In 1970 the right to vote in federal elections was extended to those between the ages of 18 and 21. Provinces soon also lowered their voting age.

=== Multiple-member districts replaced by single-member districts -- federal elections, all provinces, two territories various dates ===
At various times in the 19th and 20th centuries, federal elections and those held in every province used multi-member districts to elect all or some of its members. The systems used included Block Voting, Single transferable voting, Limited voting and a system where each seat was filled through a separate contest. Limited voting usually resulted in mixed multi-party representation, according representation to both the majority and at least the largest minority. STV resulted in mixed multi-party representation and every candidate that had quota were elected, thus every party with substantial backing in the district got some representation. Block voting in multi-member districts usually (but not always) produced one-party sweeps of the district's seats.

Now federal elections — and all provincial and territorial elections — use only single-member districts, a situation that came about through electoral reform.

Eleven ridings elected multiple MPs (two at a time) at one time or another, between 1867 and 1968. These were Ottawa, West Toronto, Hamilton, Halifax (NS), Cape Breton (NS), Pictou (NS), St. John City and County (NB), Victoria and three in PEI: King's County, Queen's County and Prince County.

All the provinces and territories (except Nunavut) once used multiple-member districts. Most of the multiple-member districts elected just two, but others elected 5 to 7 or more. Ten MLAs were elected in the Winnipeg district from 1920 to 1949.

The provinces and territories switched to electing all their members in single-member districts elected through First past the post in these years:

- Quebec 1867
- North-West Territories 1894 (see 1891 North-West Territories general election)
- Yukon 1920
- Ontario 1926
- Manitoba 1954
- Alberta 1956
- Saskatchewan 1967
- New Brunswick 1974
- Newfoundland and Labrador 1975
- Nova Scotia 1978
- BC 1990
- PEI 1996

(PEI's elections were special cases. Each district elected two members. At one time voters who owned property in the district voted for the Councilman while voters resident in the district joined with the property-owners to vote for the Assemblyman. Later the exact same voters were allowed to vote for each of the two members in a district but still each seat was filled in separate contest.)

=== 1800s ===
==== 1886, 1890 Ontario used Limited Voting in Toronto ====
Toronto's three MPPs were elected through Limited voting, where each voter could cast up to two votes. Later Toronto MPPs were elected in two-seat districts, with each seat elected separately through single-winner First Past The Post voting. This ended in 1926 when all the MPPs in the province began to be elected in single-member districts.

=== 1900s ===
==== 1909-1921 Alberta partially adopted Block Voting system ====
For the 1909, 1913 and 1921 election Alberta adopted multiple-member city-wide districts in one or both of the cities of Edmonton and Calgary. Alberta's two army representatives were elected in 1917 in one contest. Also in 1921, the city of Medicine Hat was a two-seat district. Voters cast multiple votes under the Plurality block voting to elect MLAs.

==== 1914 Manitoba adopted multi-member districts, later brought in STV/FPTP then STV/IRV ====
In 1914, the three Winnipeg districts -- Winnipeg Centre, Winnipeg South and Winnipeg North — were each given a second member. Each seat was filled through a separate contest. The same system was used in the 1915 election.

In 1920 Winnipeg was made into a ten-member city-wide district. Manitoba began to use Single transferable voting in the new district. Later the province adopted Alternative Voting in single-member rural districts.

In 1949 Winnipeg was divided into three four-seat districts. St. Boniface got a second member and switched from AV to STV to elect its MLAs.

==== 1924 Alberta adopted STV/AV system ====
After the election of the United Farmers of Alberta in 1921, Alberta maintained its existing mixture of multi-member districts and single-member districts. In 1924 Alberta adopted Single transferable voting in the cities' multi-member districts and the Instant-runoff voting system in single-member rural districts. (It was the first instance in North America where all the members in a legislature were elected through non-plurality methods.) This mixed system was in use until 1956. In 1956 the province brought in consistent single-member districts and First past the post elections. Medicine Hat reverted to being a single-member district before the 1930 election (IRV was then used there).

==== 1922 House of Commons elections ====
Canadian MP William Charles Good introduced legislation in the House of Commons in June 1922 that would have seen Instant-runoff voting used in each riding where more than two candidates were competing and he also called for demonstration multi-member districts in to provide experience of proportional representation. However the bill was talked out and nothing was changed.

==== 1952, 1953 BC elections used Instant-runoff voting electoral system ====
In 1952, BC adopted the Alternative Voting system. It retained its mixture of single-member districts and multi-member districts. In the later, it held separate contests for each seat. preferential ballots was used for the first time in a BC general election. After 1953 election the province returned to its previous electoral system, a mixture of single-member and multi-member districts, of Block Voting and FPTP, which in turn was replaced by consistent FPTP single-member-district contests in 1990.

=== 2000-2009 ===
==== 2004 Quebec proposed electoral reform ====
The Liberal government of Quebec proposed electoral reform in 2004, which was scheduled to be passed in the fall of 2006 without a referendum. The project was postponed due to divergent views on how to improve it.

==== 2005 BC Single Transferable Vote referendum ====
In a 2005 referendum 57.7% of British Columbians voted in favour of the Single Transferable Vote system. However the government required a vote of 60% to pass the change, and the vote result was ignored.

==== 2005 PEI Provincial MMP referendum ====
Prince Edward Island held a referendum in 2005 regarding the adoption of mixed member proportional representation. The motion was defeated.

==== 2007 Ontario MMP referendum ====
A referendum was held in Ontario in 2007 on the question of whether to establish a mixed member proportional representation (MMP) system for elections to the Legislative Assembly of Ontario. The vote was strongly in favour of the existing plurality voting or first-past-the-post (FPTP) system.

==== 2008 New Brunswick referendum ====
A referendum on the issue of electoral reform in New Brunswick was proposed for 2008 by the Progressive Conservative Party, but the party was defeated in the September 2006 election and the new Liberal government cancelled the vote.

==== 2009 BC Proportional Representation Vote referendum ====
A referendum for the proportional representation (PR) system was held in British Columbia on May 12, 2009. The adoption of PR was defeated, with 61% of voters preferring First past the post (FPTP) over Proportional Representation.

=== 2015-present ===
==== 2015 federal election ====
In the 2015 federal election, both of the main opposition parties (the federal Liberals and NDP) promised to implement electoral reform no later than the next scheduled election. The NDP has long supported Mixed Member Proportional, a hybrid system proposed by the Law Commission in which voters would cast two ballots (one for a riding representative and one for their preferred party, with member elected from a regional and open list).

By comparison, the Liberals led by Justin Trudeau promised to review numerous electoral reform options through an "all party parliamentary committee" and to implement the changes in time for the next election. Trudeau promised to make the 2015 election "Canada's last first-past-the-post election". There are differences between the political parties over which alternative system would be better.

67% of Canadians voted in 2015 for parties that promised to replace the voting system. 88% of experts brought forward by the Liberal government recommended a proportional representation voting system; 96% rejected Trudeau's preferred Instant-runoff voting system. On December 1, 2016, the all party Special Committee on Electoral Reform released its final report, recommending that the government design a system of proportional representation with a gallagher index score of 5 or less, and hold a national referendum with that system against the current system. The Liberal members of the all party special-committee urged Prime Minister Justin Trudeau to break his promise to change Canada's voting system.

On February 1, 2017, the new Liberal Minister of Democratic Institutions, Karina Gould, announced that Trudeau instructed her that a change of voting system would no longer be in her mandate. She claimed a lack of broad consensus among Canadians in favour of one particular type of electoral voting and that the various political parties could not agree on a new system as reasons for the abandonment of the 2015 election promise. On May 31, 2017, the House of Commons officially rejected the final report of the all party special-committee by a vote of 146–159, with the Conservatives, NDP, BQ, and Greens voting to concur in the report, and the Liberals voting not to, notably, two Liberal MPs, Sean Casey and Nathaniel Erskine-Smith broke whip and voted to concur in the report.

During the 2015 election campaign, the Liberal Party of Canada made a promise to implement a process to review the costs of campaign platforms in future elections. It was implemented within an omnibus bill passed in 2017, with responsibility assigned to the Parliamentary Budget Office.

==== 2016 Prince Edward Island electoral reform referendum ====
The 2016 Plebiscite on Democratic Renewal was a non-binding referendum held in the Canadian province of Prince Edward Island between October 27 – November 7, 2016. The referendum asked which of five voting systems residents would prefer to use in electing members to the Legislative Assembly of Prince Edward Island. The referendum was conducted using Instant runoff voting, and no option was the choice of a majority in the first count. After three options were eliminated due to being un-electable, mixed member proportional representation received more than 52% support on the final count. But government ignored the result, holding another referendum in 2019.

==== 2018 British Columbia Electoral Reform Referendum ====
In accordance to campaign promises, the BC NDP (In a confidence and supply agreement with the Greens) scheduled a plebiscite to be held between October 22 and November 30, 2018, with voting done through mail for those registered to vote. 61.3% of voters voted for retaining First Past The Post.

==== 2019 Prince Edward Island Electoral Reform Referendum ====
the 2019 referendum ended in defeat. On the question "Should Prince Edward Island change its voting system to a mixed member proportional voting system?", 52 percent voted against change while only 48 percent voted in favour. But neither side took a majority of votes in 60 percent of the districts so government did not consider it a clear decision. In 2021/2022, PEI again investigated switching away from the FPTP system.

==== 2022 Quebec proposed electoral reform ====
CAQ François Legault was elected on a promise to reform the electoral system within a year of his victory in 2018. On September 25, 2019, Minister of Justice Sonia LeBel presented Bill 39, An Act to establish a new electoral system which aims to replace the First-past-the-post electoral system in favour of a mixed-member proportional representation system. According to the bill, the National Assembly would have kept 125 members. Of the 125 members, 80 would have been elected by receiving a plurality of votes in single-member districts matching the 78 federal ridings with the addition of 2 unique districts: Îles-de-la-Madeleine and Ungava). The remaining 45 members would have been chosen according to their order in a regional party list. All 17 regions of Quebec would have been guaranteed at least one MNA.

Bill 39 was intended to be debated in the legislature before June 2021. The bill's implementation would have been contingent on popular support expressed in a referendum held on the same day as the general election. Was this referendum successful, then the first legislature to be elected under mixed-member proportional would have been the 44th, in October 2026 at the latest. On April 28, 2021, Justice Minister LeBel informed a legislative committee hearing that the government would not move forward with a referendum on electoral reform in 2022. LeBel blamed the COVID-19 pandemic for altering the government's timeline and could not commit to providing an alternate date for the referendum, effectively ending discussions about electoral reform in Quebec.

==== 2025 Yukon electoral reform plebiscite ====
Following the final report from the citizen's assembly on electoral reform, the territorial government announced on September 19, 2024, that a plebiscite on adopting instant-runoff voting would be held simultaneously with the 2025 general election. The opposition Yukon Party reiterated its stance that changes to Yukon's electoral system should have to go through a referendum, while expressing its preference for first-past-the-post voting. The Yukon NDP was for the plebiscite while the Yukon Liberal Party was neutral on the matter.

According to preliminary results, the plebiscite recorded a majority in favour of switching to ranked-choice voting, with 56.18% in favour and 43.82% opposed. The Yukon Party government has not taken steps to change from FPTP.

== See also ==
- Canadian electoral calendar
- Canadian electoral system
- Canadian House of Commons Special Committee on Electoral Reform
- Democracy Day (Canada)
- Electronic voting in Canada
- Fair Vote Canada
- Federal political financing in Canada
- List of Canadian federal electoral districts
- List of Canadian federal general elections
- List of elections in the Province of Canada (pre-Confederation)
- List of federal by-elections in Canada
- List of political parties in Canada
- Historical federal electoral districts of Canada
- Proportional representation in Canada
- Referendums in Canada
- Timeline of Canadian elections
- Voter turnout in Canada
- Longest Ballot Committee

See also Category: Electoral reform in Canada
