= Salmon (surname) =

Salmon is a surname. Notable people with the name include:

- Adam Salmon, American researcher and professor
- Alex Salmon (born 1994), English footballer
- André Salmon (1881–1969), French writer
- Barnett Salmon (1829–1897), co-founder of Salmon & Gluckstein, by 1900 the world's largest retail tobacconist
- Benoît Salmon (born 1974), French road racing cyclist
- Cecil Salmon (1885–1975), American agronomist
- Chris Salmon, British banker, Chief Cashier of the Bank of England (2011–2014)
- Christine Salmon (1916–1985), American architect and educator
- Christopher Salmon (born 1978), Welsh politician
- Colin Salmon (born 1961), British actor
- Cyril Salmon, Baron Salmon (1903–1991), Privy Council of the United Kingdom
- Daniel Elmer Salmon (1850–1914), American veterinary surgeon
- David Salmon (disambiguation)
- Ebony Salmon (born 2001), English footballer
- Edward Salmon (disambiguation)
- Eleanor Seely Salmon (1910–1984), American geologist
- Ernest Stanley Salmon (1871–1959), mycologist and hop breeder
- Felix Salmon (contemporary), Scottish-born financial blogger
- Frank Salmon (born 1962), English architectural historian
- Frank Salmon (priest) (1884–1979)
- Frederick M. Salmon (1870–1936), American politician
- Gaston Salmon (1878–1917), Belgian Olympic champion fencer
- George Salmon (1819–1904), Irish mathematician
- Gilly Salmon (contemporary), English academic
- Glen Salmon (born 1977), South African football striker
- Guy Salmon (born 1949), New Zealand environmentalist
- H. L. N. Salmon (1894–1943) Canadian military officer, grand nephew of Nowell Salmon
- Harry Salmon (disambiguation)
- Harvey Wallis Salmon (1839–1927), American politician
- Henry Salmon (1910–1944), English footballer
- Herman Salmon (1913–1980), American barnstormer, air racer and test pilot
- Honor Salmon (née Pitman) (1912–1943), first officer pilot in the British Air Transport Auxiliary during the Second World War
- Isidore Salmon (1876–1941), British politician
- James Salmon (disambiguation)
- Jeff Salmon (born 1953), British art dealer
- John Salmon (disambiguation)
- Kim Salmon, (born 1957), Australian indie rock musician and songwriter
- Marie Salmon (1760–1827), French woman exonerated after being wrongfully convicted
- Mark Salmon (footballer) (born 1988), Irish former footballer
- Mark Salmon, (born 1967), Australian former surf lifesaver and rugby union player
- Marli Salmon (born 2009), English footballer
- Martin Salmon (born 1997), German former road cyclist
- Matt Salmon (born 1958), American politician
- Mary Salmon (1852–1937), Australian journalist and historian
- Mike Salmon (racing driver) (1933–2016), British racing driver
- Nathan Salmon (born 1951), American philosopher of language and metaphysician
- Sir Nowell Salmon (1835–1912), English naval officer and recipient of the Victoria Cross
- Patrick Salmon (born 1952), British historian
- Paul Salmon (born 1965), Australian rules footballer
- Peter Salmon (disambiguation)
- Riley Salmon (born 1976), American volleyball player
- Robert Salmon (inventor) (1763–1821), English inventor of agricultural implements
- Robert Salmon (1775–c.1845), English-American maritime artist
- Ted Salmon (born 1943), New Zealand field hockey player
- Thomas Salmon (disambiguation)
- Tim Salmon (born 1968), American baseball player
- Wesley C. Salmon (1925–2001), American contemporary philosopher of science
- William Salmon (disambiguation)
- Woodie Salmon (born 1952), American politician
- Yvan Salmon (1848–1870), French journalist who wrote under the nom de plume Victor Noir
- Zoe Salmon (born 1980), British television presenter

== See also ==
- Salmon (given name)
- Salman (name), a given name and surname
- Salmons (surname)
- Sammon (surname)
- Sammons, a surname
