= Salman (name) =

- Pronunciation: Arabic: [salˈmaːn] Urdu [səlˈmaːn]
- Gender: Male

Origin
- Meaning: "Safe" or "Secure"
- Region of origin: Arabic

Salman or Salmaan (Arabic: سَلْمان salmān), also spelt Sulman or Selman, is a masculine given name of Arabic origin meaning "safe" or "secure". Notable people with the name include:

== Given name ==
=== Salmaan ===
- Salmaan King (born 1985), South African footballer
- Salmaan Moerat (born 1998), South African rugby union player

=== Salman ===
- Salman the Persian (568–652/53), one of Muhammad's companions
- Salman Afridi (born 1992), Pakistani cricketer
- Salman Agah (born 1972), American professional skateboarder and entrepreneur
- Salman Ali Agha (born 1993), Pakistani international cricketer
- Salman Ahmad (born 1963), Pakistani pop artist
- Salman Ahmed, American national security and foreign policy advisor
- Salman Akbar (born 1982), Pakistani field hockey player and coach
- Salman Akhtar (born 1946), Indian-American psychoanalyst
- Salman Alfarid (born 2002), Indonesian footballer
- Salman Ali, Indian singer
- Salman Alizade (born 1993), Azerbaijani boxer
- Salman Aljumaili (born 1963), Iraqi politician
- Salman Amer (born 1976), Israeli-Arab footballer
- Salman Aristo (born 1976), Indonesian screenwriter and film director
- Salman A. Avestimehr, Iranian-American academic
- Salman Al-Awadhi (born 2001), Kuwaiti footballer
- Salman Al-Azami, British-Bangladeshi author and academic
- Salman Bahrani (born 1989), Iranian footballer
- Salman Baig (born 1989), Indian first-class cricketer
- Salman Mujahid Baloch (born 1976), Pakistani politician
- Salman Bashir (born 1952), Pakistani diplomat
- Salman Bhojani (born 1980), American corporate lawyer and politician
- Salman Bijnori (born 1969), Indian Islamic scholar
- Salman Butt (born 1984), Pakistani cricketer
- Salman Aslam Butt, Pakistani lawyer and advisor
- Salman Dawood, Iraqi footballer
- Salman Zain Al Deen, Lebanese poet, author, novelist, and critic
- Salman Al-Dosari (born 1963), Saudi footballer
- Salman bin Yousuf Al Dossary (born 1968), Saudi journalist
- Salman Eliyahu (1872–1940), Iraqi Rabbi
- Salman Hamud Fallah (1935–2016), Israeli-Arab educator and historian
- Salman Al-Faraj (born 1989), Saudi footballer
- Salman Faris (born 1985), Sri Lankan-born Emirati cricketer
- Salman Farooq (born 1981), Emirati cricketer
- Salman Fayyaz (born 1997), Pakistani cricketer
- Salman Gambarov (born 1959), Azerbaijani jazz pianist and composer
- Salman Fayyaz Ghanni, Pakistani Army general
- Salman Habaka (1990–2023), Israel-Arab IDF officer
- Salman Haidar (born 1937), Indian diplomat
- Salman Haneef (born 1981), Pakistani politician
- Salman ul Haq (born 2001), Pakistani footballer
- Salman Al-Hariri (born 1988), Saudi footballer
- Salman Hashimikov (1952–2025), Russian wrestler
- Salman Hazazi (born 1992), Saudi footballer
- Salman Hesam (born 1947), Iranian athlete
- Salman Hossain (born 1997), Bangladeshi first-class cricketer
- Salman Iqbal, Pakistani media businessman and media mogul
- Salman Irshad (born 1995), Pakistani cricketer
- Salman Isa (born 1977), Bahraini footballer
- Salman bin Khalid (born 1991), Qatari poet
- Salman Al Khalifa (born 1976), Bahraini racing driver
- Salman Ebrahim Mohamed Ali Al Khalifa (born 1979), Bahraini Guantanamo detainee
- Salman bin Hamad Al Khalifa (born 1894) (1894–1961), Bahraini ruler
- Salman bin Hamad Al Khalifa (born 1969), Bahraini prince
- Salman bin Ibrahim Al Khalifa (born 1965), Bahraini football administrator
- Salman bin Khalifa Al Khalifa, Bahraini royal
- Salman Khan (born 1965), Indian actor and producer
- Salman Khan (educator) (born 1976), American educator
- Salman Khan (Indian cricketer) (born 1998), Indian cricketer
- Salman Khan (Pakistani cricketer) (born 1971), Pakistani first-class cricketer
- Salman Yusuff Khan (born 1985), Indian dancer and actor
- Salman Khodadadi (born 1962), Iranian politician
- Salman Khurshid (born 1953), Indian politician
- Salman Mansoorpuri (born 1967), Indian Islamic scholar, jurist, and writer
- Salman Masalha (born 1953), Israeli-Arab poet, writer, essayist, and translator
- Salman Masood, Pakistani journalist
- Salman Mazahiri (1946–2020), Indian Muslim scholar
- Salman Mirza (born 1994), Pakistani cricketer
- Salman Al-Moasher (born 1988), Saudi footballer
- Salman Al-Mosawi (born 1995), Kuwaiti karateka
- Salman Mumtaz (1884–1941), Azerbaijani poet, literature historian, and bibliographer
- Salman al-Murshid (1907–1946), Syrian Murshidi religious figure
- Salman Musayev (born 1958), Azerbaijani Islamic scholar and mufti
- Salman Nadwi (1954–2026), Indian Islamic scholar
- Salman Natour (1949–2016), Israeli-Arab writer and novelist
- Salman Nazar (born 1991), Canadian cricketer
- Salman Nizar (born 1997), Indian cricketer
- Salman al-Ouda (born 1956), Saudi Islamic scholar
- Salman Owega (born 2005), German racing driver
- Salman Rabeii (born 1979), Yemeni Guantanamo detainee
- Salman ibn Rabi'a (died 650), Rashidun governor
- Salman Raduyev (1967–2002), Chechen separatist warlord
- Salman F Rahman (born 1951), Bangladeshi business magnate and a politician
- Salman Akram Raja, Pakistani attorney and politician
- Salman Rawaf, British academic
- Salman Omar Rubel, Bangladeshi politician
- Salman Rushdie (born 1947), British-Indian novelist
- Salman Sabah Al-Salem Al-Homoud Al-Sabah (born 1960), Kuwaiti politician
- Salman Sagar, Indian politician
- Salman bin Abdulaziz Al Saud (born 1935), King of Saudi Arabia
- Salman bin Abdulaziz Al Saud (born 1982) (born 1982), Saudi royal
- Salman bin Sultan Al Saud (born 1976), Saudi royal and politician
- Salman Savaji (died 1376), Persian poet
- Salman Sayyid, British political philosopher
- Salman Schocken (1877–1959), German Jewish publisher
- Salman Shah (actor) (1971–1996), Bangladeshi film actor
- Salman Shah (economist) (born 1950), Pakistani economist and finance minister
- Salman Shaheen (born 1984), British politician, journalist, and novelist
- Salman Shahid (born 1952), Pakistani actor
- Salman Shahid (politician), Pakistani politician
- Salman Sharida (born 1952), Bahraini football coach and player
- Salman Hamad Al-Sheikh (born 1968), Bahraini soldier and politician
- Salman Shukur (1921–2007), Iraqi oud player
- Salman Al-Sibyani (born 1989), Saudi footballer
- Salman Abu Sitta (born 1937), Palestinian researcher
- Salman Taseer (1944–2011), Pakistani businessman and politician
- Salman Toor (born 1983), American-Pakistani painter
- Salman Tumah (born 1935), Iraqi poet, writer, and historian
- Salman Khan Ustajlu (died 1623/24), Turkoman military leader
- Salman Zaib (born 1994), Pakistani cricketer
- Salman Zarka (born 1964), Israeli-Arab physician

== Surname ==
=== Salmaan ===
- Dulquer Salmaan (born 1983), Indian Malayalam film actor and playback singer

=== Salman ===
- Ali Salman (born 1965), Bahraini Twelver Shi'a cleric and Secretary-General of the Al-Wefaq political society
- Athena Salman (born 1989), American politician
- David Salman (1936–2010), American politician
- Hussain Salman (born 1982), Bahraini footballer
- İlyas Salman (born 1949), Turkish actor, film director, author, screenwriter, and musician
- Karim Salman (1965–2020), Iraqi footballer
- Saad Salman (born 1950), French-Iraqi film director

=== Salmani ===
- Peyman Salmani (born 1994), Iranian footballer

== See also ==
- Suleiman, a name, including a list of variants
- Arabic name
- Salmon (given name)
- Salmon (surname)
- Selman (disambiguation)
- Sulman
- Zalman
