= Ludwig Lore =

American editor and writer (1875–1942)

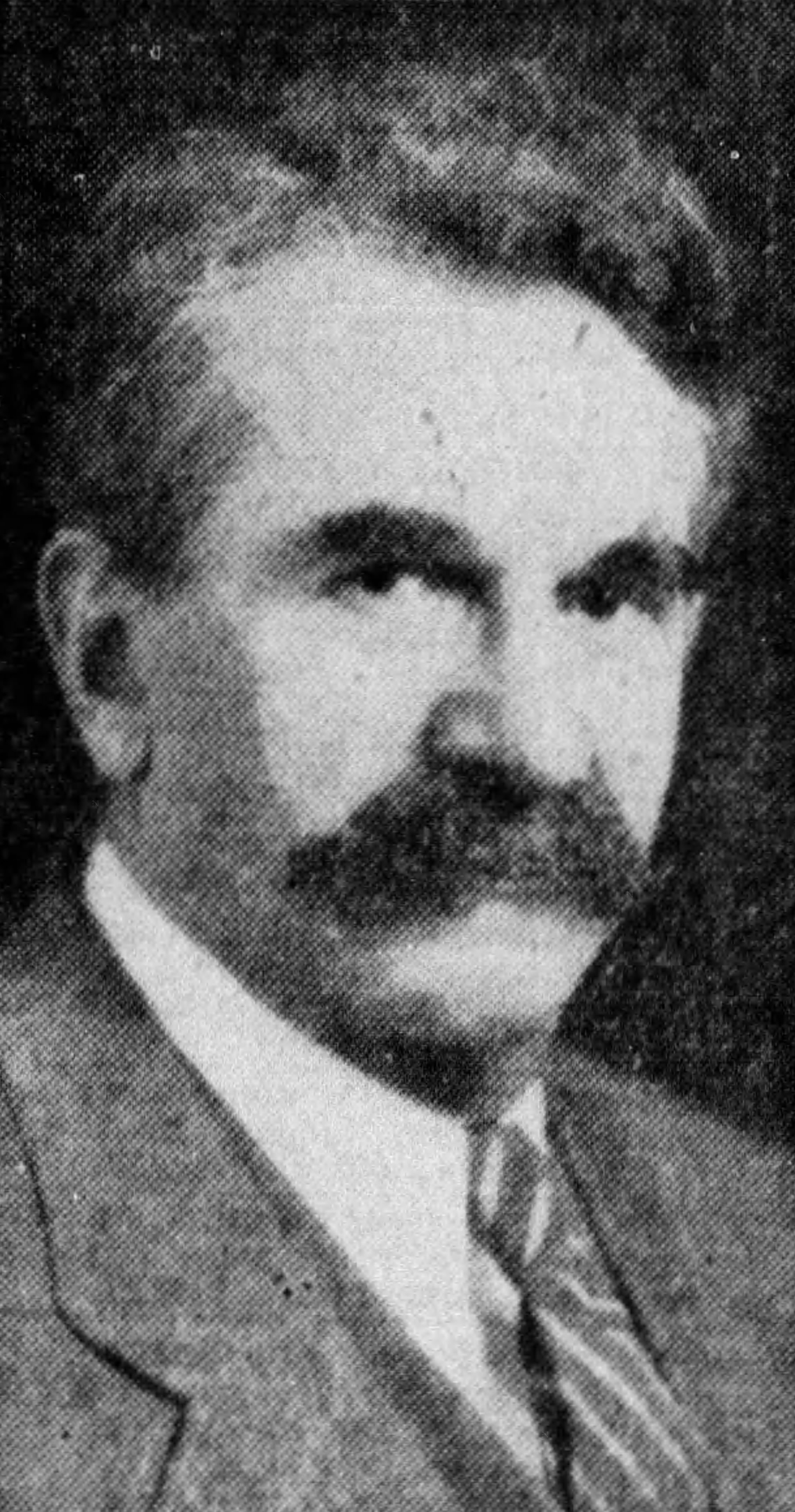
- Lore c. 1939
- Born: June 26, 1875; Friedeberg am Queis (now Mirsk), Kingdom of Prussia, German Empire
- Died: July 8, 1942 (aged 67); New York City, U.S.
- Education: Berlin University
- Occupations: Writer, editor, politician, spy
- Years active: 1892–1942
- Employer(s): New Yorker Volkszeitung, The Class Struggle, New York Evening Post
- Known for: Editor-in-chief of New Yorker Volkszeitung, columinist for "Behind the Cables"
- Spouse: Lily Schneppe (m. 1909)
- Children: Karl, Kurt, Eugene

Ludwig Lore (June 26, 1875 – July 8, 1942) was an American socialist magazine editor, newspaper writer, lecturer, and politician, best remembered for his tenure as editor of the socialist New Yorker Volkszeitung and role as a factional leader in the early American communist movement. During the middle 1930s, he wrote the daily foreign affairs column "Behind the Cables" for the New York Post. Later still, he was charged with having secretly worked recruiting potential agents and gathering information on behalf of the Soviet foreign intelligence network.

== Background ==
Ludwig Lore was born to working class parents of ethnic Jewish extraction in Friedeberg am Queis in Lower Silesia (now Mirsk, Poland) on June 26, 1875. Lore attended gymnasium in "Hirschberg, (now Jelenia Góra), also in Lower Silesia) and later graduated from Berlin University, where he studied under political economist Werner Sombart. Upon completion of his education in 1892, Lore went to work in the textile industry. He remained in that industry until emigrating to the United States in 1903. While in Germany, Lore joined the Social Democratic Party (SPD) of that country, holding office in the party and standing as an SPD candidate for political office.

== Career ==
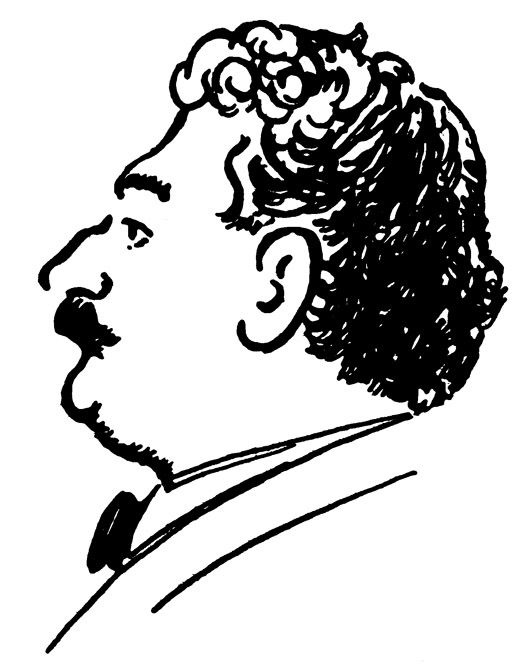
Caricature of Lore at the founding convention of the Communist Labor Party by Art Young for The Liberator, October 1919

=== Socialist period ===
Lore emigrated to America in 1903 and first settled in the state of Colorado where he worked at various jobs. While in Colorado, Lore joined the fledgling Industrial Workers of the World.

Lore later moved to New York City where he joined the staff of the German-language socialist daily, the New Yorker Volkszeitung, becoming Associate Editor of the publication within a few years and editor-in-chief during World War I. Under Lore the paper had more the feel of a tabloid magazine than a typical straight newspaper, an orientation which is said by American historian Paul Buhle to have "suited his personality and approach."

Lore did periodically participate in various electoral campaigns of the Socialist Party of America, such as traveling to Altoona, Pennsylvania to address a German-language street meeting in support of the November 1908 Presidential effort of Eugene V. Debs. He appeared in elections in 1914 for the Socialist Party as "Delegate-at-Large to Constitutional Convention." He was also involved in the cooperative movement as a director of the American Wholesale Cooperative Company, formed in Brooklyn in 1910 upon a capital investment of $20,000.

Lore was an early and active opponent of World War I, speaking at an anti-war meeting in New York City in August 1914 that was attended by 4,000 people. Lore shared the platform a host of other prominent socialist leaders, who condemned the war in English, Russian, French, German, Polish, Italian, Hungarian, Yiddish, and Latvian for their international immigrant audience.

With American entry into war in the wind in the spring of 1917, the Socialist Party rushed to hold an Emergency National Convention in St. Louis. Lore was elected as a delegate to this gathering and was chosen as a member of the convention's Platform Committee — although he did not take part in the writing of the party's controversial anti-war statement, remembered as the St. Louis Manifesto.

Following American entry into the war, Lore remained steadfast in his opposition. On May 30 and 31, 1917, the Socialist Party organized an event in New York City touted as the First American Conference for Peace and Democracy, aimed at joining various anti-war groups into a common effort to bring a speedy end to the European conflagration. As an anti-war emigrant from the German empire, Ludwig Lore played a prominent role at this gathering, delivering a speech to the gathering at the first day's session in which he expounded upon the peace efforts being made in Germany by the Social Democratic Party to bring about immediate peace.

Records indicate the following election efforts:

- November 2, 1915: New York Assembly - Kings County, District 07: lost with 2.62% vote
- November 7, 1916: New York Assembly - Kings County, District 09: lost with 6.24% vote
- November 7, 1917: New York Assembly - Kings County, District 20: lost with 18.69% vote
- November 4, 1924: New York Assembly - Kings County, District 14: lost with 0.79% vote

(Source: OurCampaigns.com)

=== Communist period ===
Lore c. 1917

In 1917, Lore founded the bi-monthly Marxist theoretical magazine, The Class Struggle, which he edited in conjunction with Louis C. Fraina and Louis Boudin.

Lore was a founding member of the Communist Labor Party of America, an organization which, following a decade of splits and mergers, ultimately evolved into the Communist Party USA.

During this interval, Lore's New Yorker Volkszeitung was brought into the communist orbit, albeit neither fully nor wholeheartedly. The paper professed what was essentially a Communist interpretation of international events and advocated a general Communist policy at home, yet was only partially and unwillingly dragged into the mire of the bitter factional Communist Party politics of the 1920s.

One historian notes:

For the [New Yorker Volkszeitung] veteran, the struggle for political, electoral socialism in the United States had taken decades of self-sacrifice and many reversals. Readers of the paper had never been happy with the 'underground' mentality of the early Communist movement, because they viewed hyperrevolutionary rhetoric as the worst possible response to repression. The formation of a legal Workers Party in 1922, and the beginnings of a political campaign structure (minimal though it was), encouraged them greatly.

Lore was two times a candidate of the Workers Party of America, running for Lieutenant Governor of New York in 1922 and for U.S. Congress in the New York 14th District in 1924.

In 1924, Lore became an early victim of Party factionalism (discussed by Whittaker Chambers in his memoirs). James P. Cannon led the charges against Lore, which he summarized as (1) misconception of the strategy and tactics of the Communist International and (2) wrong analysis of the economic and political forces operating within the framework of present-day America. He went on to denounce him for "Loreism." (or "incurable Loreism" as Chambers put it). C. E. Reuthenberg continued to denounce Loreism in 1925. (Cannon would continue to castigate Lore into the 1930s.) In August 1925, the party expelled Lore.

=== Post-Communist period ===
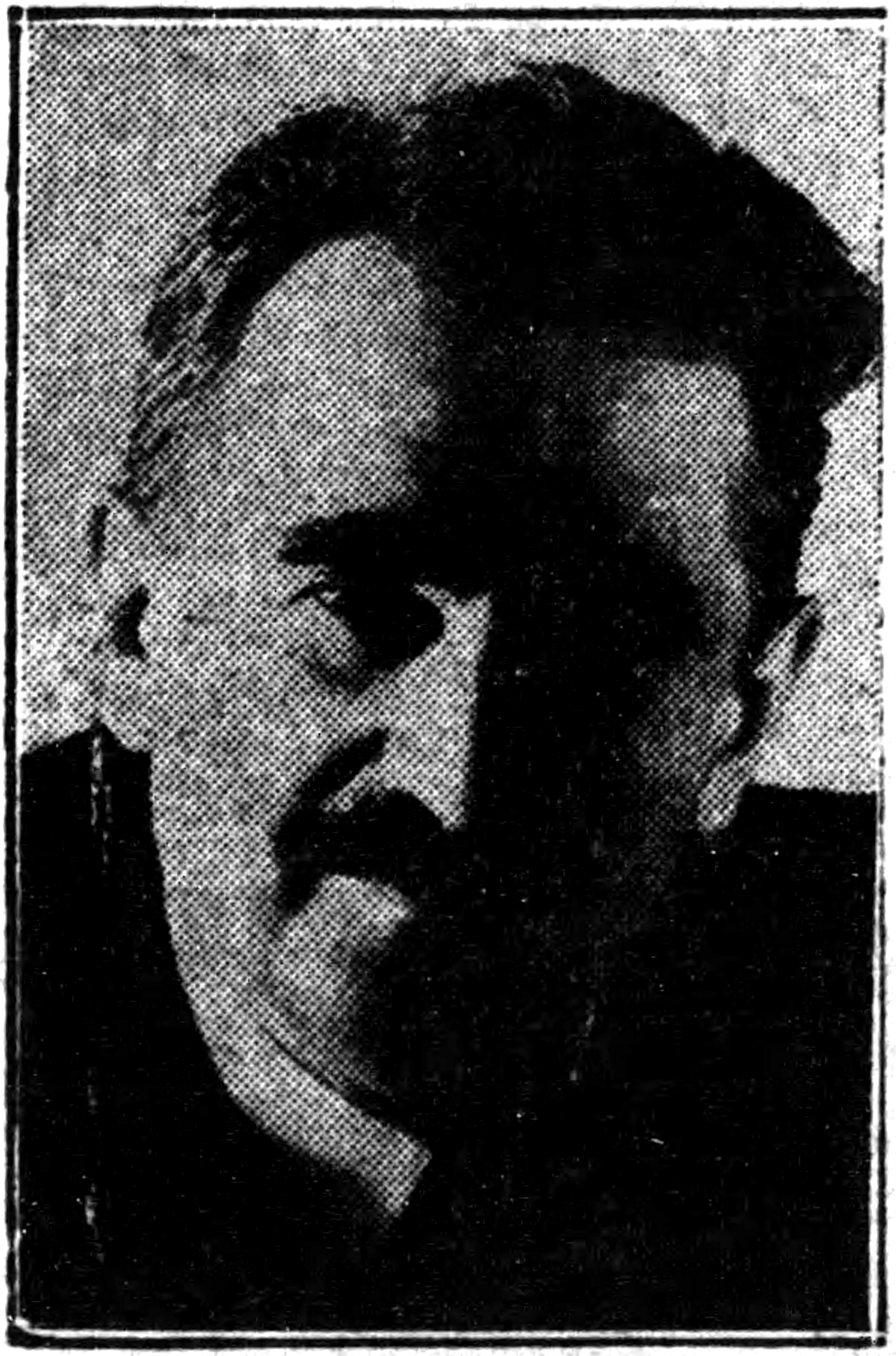
Lore c. 1940

Lore was an independent thinker who was reluctant to take political orders, a personal characteristic which made him unsuited for the increasingly centralized Communist movement of the late 1920s. In addition, his well-known personal fondness for Leon Trotsky, established during Trotsky's time living in New York, during which he wrote for The Class Struggle, made Lore an easy target for factional opponents.

In 1925, fearing proto-Trotskyist indiscipline, Lore was brought up on charges before the executive of the Workers (Communist) Party's German Language Federation. When the executive refused to expel Lore, changes were made in the composition of the body to make Lore's expulsion inevitable. Lore was expelled from the organization later that same year.

As editor of the Volkszeitung, Lore attempted what has described as a "balancing a feeling for a theoretical Marxist line with a more sensitive reading of American political culture," in which he "tried, and ultimately failed, to develop a communism that would meet the demands of the aging generation of radical German-Americans in the 1920s and 1930s."

By the end of the 1920s, the Volkszeitung had lost some of its radical edge, taking the form of a more vaguely "socialistic" labor and cultural publication, complete with wire service photos and non-political fare such as radio listings and classic literature. Lore sought to occupy political space in between social democracy and communism, a position roughly akin to that of the Independent Labour Party in Great Britain.

As the 1920s came to a close and the Communist Party moved into an ultra-sectarian phase known as the "Third Period," Lore found himself disaffected from his old party comrades. His Volkszeitung continued to defend the policies of the Soviet Union, however, and sought to support CP-sponsored initiatives in which radicals of various stripes could work together for common objectives, such as the International Workers Order and the International Labor Defense.

In 1931, Lore gave up the editorship of the ailing Volkszeitung to become a freelance journalist.

LUDWIG LORE gets at the root of the news! Today ... with censorship clamped down on news sources in so many parts of the world ... it becomes increasingly difficult to determine the complete significance of the reports we read. What has been deleted? How much has been concealed? How much propaganda has been added? Let the keen analytical powers of Ludwig Lore help you decipher the flashes from abroad. In his daily column, "Behind the Cables," he digs deep into the roots of the news and unearths the underlying meanings of the stories that reach our shores.
Behind the Cables
every day in the
New York Post

In 1934, Lore joined the editorial staff of the New York Post (then the New York Evening Post, a newspaper whose contributors have included Walt Whitman). For the Post, he wrote a daily foreign affairs column called "Behind the Cables," in which he often emphasized the threat to world peace implicit in the rise to power of Adolf Hitler and the Nazi party in Germany. The Post used to run prominent ads for the column (see box that quotes ad in this entry).

During World War II, Lore appeared regularly on WEVD radio (established by the Socialist Party of America in 1927, taken over by The Jewish Daily Forward in 1932). One of his first appearances was on August 8, 1939, on a symposium about the "Danzig Dispute" with Michael Kwapiszewski and Marko deDominis. His last appearance was on June 3, 1942, on a Round Table program titled "Battle Front and Home Front" with Christopher T. Emmet Jr.

He left the Post in January 1942, when he "took over a special government assignment," according to the New York Times.

=== Personal life and death ===
In 1909, Lore married Lily Schneppe (Chambers called her "Lillian"); together they had three boys.

Ludwig Lore died on July 8, 1942, at his home on Ocean Parkway in Brooklyn, New York.

== Legacy ==
=== Espionage allegations ===
During his freelance interval (1931-1934), Lore was recruited to work for the foreign intelligence network of the Soviet Union, working under the code-names "Leo" and "10."

According to historians Haynes and Klehr, the exact date of Lore's termination by Soviet intelligence is not known and no record of him is said to be found in secret police archives after April 1937.

In fact, according to Lore's case file, on July 2, 1937, Moscow Centre instructed its New York "illegals" to break off the relationship with Lore and "to take measures to avoid any hostile actions" on his part.

=== Chambers accounts ===
As recounted in his 1952 memoir Witness, Whittaker Chambers came to know Lore because they both reported to rezident Markin: He described him as follows:

Lore was an old Bolshevik. He had been a Socialist before the Russian Revolution. In those pre-revolutionary days, he had been the friend of Trotsky, then a New York Socialist journalist. After the Revolution, Lore had managed an American speaking trip for Alexandra Kollontai, the author of Red Love, later the Soviet ambassador to Sweden. Bukharin, in his New York days, had eaten and slept in the apartment on 55th Street in Brooklyn, where Lore, his outspokenly anti-Communist wife and three wholly American sons still lived.

He describes the Lore family with some detail:

I was introduced to Lillian Lore, Ludwig's remarkable wife, who in large part provided those meals, and, by some economic miracle, had kept that amazing household together during the long, lean years, had fed the endless procession of guests. "Die unvergessliche Lores-the unforgettable Lores," a German friend had called them ... I have seldom seen a happy family life so explicit in the characters of all who shared it... I soon came to regard the Lores' house as a kind of second home. For Ludwig I developed an almost filial feeling as of a younger for an older revolutionist. The kindness of all the Lores to me was personal, and in spite of politics, for all the other members of the family, except Ludwig, were outspoken in their detestation of the Communist Party.

Chambers also describes a defector's fear of retribution from the Soviet Underground, which Lore and he shared:

I did not know that at the very time I was visiting him most frequently, Lore was under surveillance. He was being watched, not by the American authorities, but by the Russian secret police... I discovered that he was afraid to walk alone with me on the street at night and that he was terrified to get into an automobile alone with me. Then I knew that there was something seriously amiss. But I had been out of the Communist Party six or seven years, and Lore was dead, before I discovered that the old Bolshevik, in whom, as a younger man, I respected the older revolutionist, had denounced me (around 1941) to the F.B.I. I learned it not from the FBI, but from another security agency of the Government.
I respected Lore all the more for that act. My feeling for him and for all the Lores remained unchanged.

=== "Conservative" accounts ===
American historians John Earl Haynes and Harvey Klehr, with former KGB officer Alexander Vassiliev, have credited Lore with the recruitment and handling of David A. Salmon (code-named "Willi"), one of Soviet intelligence's most important information assets in the US government. Citing Soviet archival evidence, the historians charge that from 1934 until early 1937 Lore paid Salmon, chief of the U.S. Department of State's communication and archives division, a stipend of $500 per month in exchange for classified diplomatic communications — information then passed along to the Soviets. While it is not clear whether Salmon was aware he was providing information to a foreign government or merely leaking information for a fee to a prominent New York Post journalist, or even whether Salmon was "Willi" at all, the fact remains that for several years Soviet intelligence had unparalleled access to the secret communications of prominent diplomatic and military decision-makers through Lore's connection.

According to Haynes and Klehr, Lore's contact with Soviet intelligence seems to have been ended in 1937 owing to a belief in Moscow that Lore retained ties to the Trotskyist movement. In the superheated atmosphere of the Great Purge the Trotskyists were believed by Soviet authorities to be engaged in an international terrorist conspiracy aimed at the overthrow of the Stalin regime and Lore's purported connection cast doubt upon his loyalty and reliability. In addition, Lore was believed by his Soviet handlers to have been guilty of financial improprieties, taking the form of double-dipping for multiple monthly expense stipends. In fact, the real reason for the Soviet's termination of relationship was their discovery that Lore had cheated them about the identity of his sources at the Department of State.

=== "Liberal" accounts ===
Julius Kobyakov, a Russian major general in the SVR and previously a "deputy director of the KGB's American Division in the late 1980s", adds some detail to Chambers' account, in that "Leo" began his work for Soviet intelligence in 1933, recruited by Soviet intelligence rezident Valentin Markin. In 2004, he wrote:

I can refer to the case of LEO and his sub-sources: WILLIE, DANIEL and others (HW p. 34-35). The authors dutifully copied and translated odd reports from the case-file but when it came to analysis and conclusions they were not up to the task. They claim that even after it became clear that LEO was a con-man (he created fictitious sources and fabricated their reports) the KGB continued to use him for several years. In fact, after LEO's perfidy was confirmed, the Center for some time toyed with the idea of kidnapping him, either in Great Britain or in Spain, and shipping him off to Russia for interrogation, but that idea was abandoned and LEO terminated. And the authors obviously failed to recognize colorful and resourceful LEO as Ludwig Lore, former editor of the Volkszeitung and a columnist for the New York Evening Post. His path curiously crossed with that of Chambers, who mentioned him several dozen times|"Witness" pp. 201, 217, 352, 387-392, 412-413, 492. (Note: The "authors" refer to Allen Weinstein and Alexander Vassiliev.)

Svetlana Chervonnaya, another Russian historian, asserts that Lore falsely claimed the high ranking functionary Salmon as his source so as to throw his Soviet handlers off the trail to the fact that he was himself rewriting information obtained from "lower level clerks at the Communications and Records Division." After enhancing the mundane information which he received with his own interpretive content, Lore then pocketed the handsome monthly stipend which was purportedly destined for the top-ranking official Salmon, Chervonnaya charges. Chervonnaya indicates that in February 1937 Lore's deception was discovered by Soviet intelligence when they rented an apartment across the street from Lore and began round-the-clock surveillance. Chervonnaya cites the published work of Julius Kobyakov as the basis for her challenge:

Throughout the whole period of surveillance, he left his home only once, for four hours. For three nights running, [Lore's] study was bustling with work, with the participation of all the family members; in particular, [Lore's] wife and son were taking turns at the typewriter typing something. When providing us with the materials, [Lore] repeated his usual lies about a trip to Washington and meetings with sources ... With the results of physical surveillance, the Centre arrived at a preliminary conclusion, that [Lore] was an exceptionally talented compiler. The use of information from open sources, fishing in them for any new data, as well as their analysis and evaluation, often produce outstanding results; many intelligence services do not neglect this method of information-gathering. But such work is considered auxiliary to the main task — obtaining information from agent sources ... The situation was aggravated in late spring 1937, when the Soviet 'illegals' managed to ascertain that the "Willie" and "Daniel" whom Lore had presented to his Soviet handlers, were "dummies."

== Works ==
Books and contributions:

- "In the Throes of the German Revolution" (December 1918)
- "Preface" to Mein Kampf: ""The translation in this volume, the unexpurgated version in English, has been made from the two-volume first edition of Mein Kampf, the first volume of which was published in 1925, the second in 1927."

Magazines and articles therein:

- The Class Struggle (archives 1917–1919, volumes I–III)
- Trotsky, Lenine, Kautsky on the Russian Revolution! (November–December 1917)
- "Our National Executive Committee" (January–February 1918)
- "Leon Trotsky" (November 7, 1918)
- "Left Or Right?" (August 1919)
- "The National Convention" (November 1919)
- "The Communist Labor Party" (November 1919)

Articles:

- Daily Worker: "My Position Toward the Farmer-Labor Movement" (December 29, 1924)
- The Nation: "The Book of Adolf Hitler: A Diluted Version" (November 1, 1933)
- The Nation: "Nazi Politics in America: Are Nazi Agents Spreading Propaganda Here? If So, Who and Where are They?" (November 29, 1933)
- Harper's: "How Germany Arms" (April 1934)
- The New International: "A Nazi Confesses" (January 1935)
- Foreign Affairs: "Two Internationals Find a Common Foe" (January 1936)
- The Nation: "Will Europe Go to War?" (July 24 and 31, 1937)

Letters:

- To Eugene V. Debs (March 9, 1917)
- To Eugene V. Debs (March 5, 1919)
