= Edward Salomon (disambiguation) =

Edward Salomon may refer to:

- Edward Salomon (1828–1909), Jewish American politician and the 8th governor of Wisconsin
- Edward Salomons (1828–1906), Jewish English architect based in Manchester
- Edward S. Salomon (1836–1913) Jewish German-American politician and governor of Washington Territory
- Edward M. Salomon (1887–1935), Jewish American department store manager in Memphis Tennessee

== See also ==
- Edward Salmon (disambiguation)
- Edward Solomon (disambiguation)
- Ed Salamon, American radio producer and executive
