= David A. Salmon =

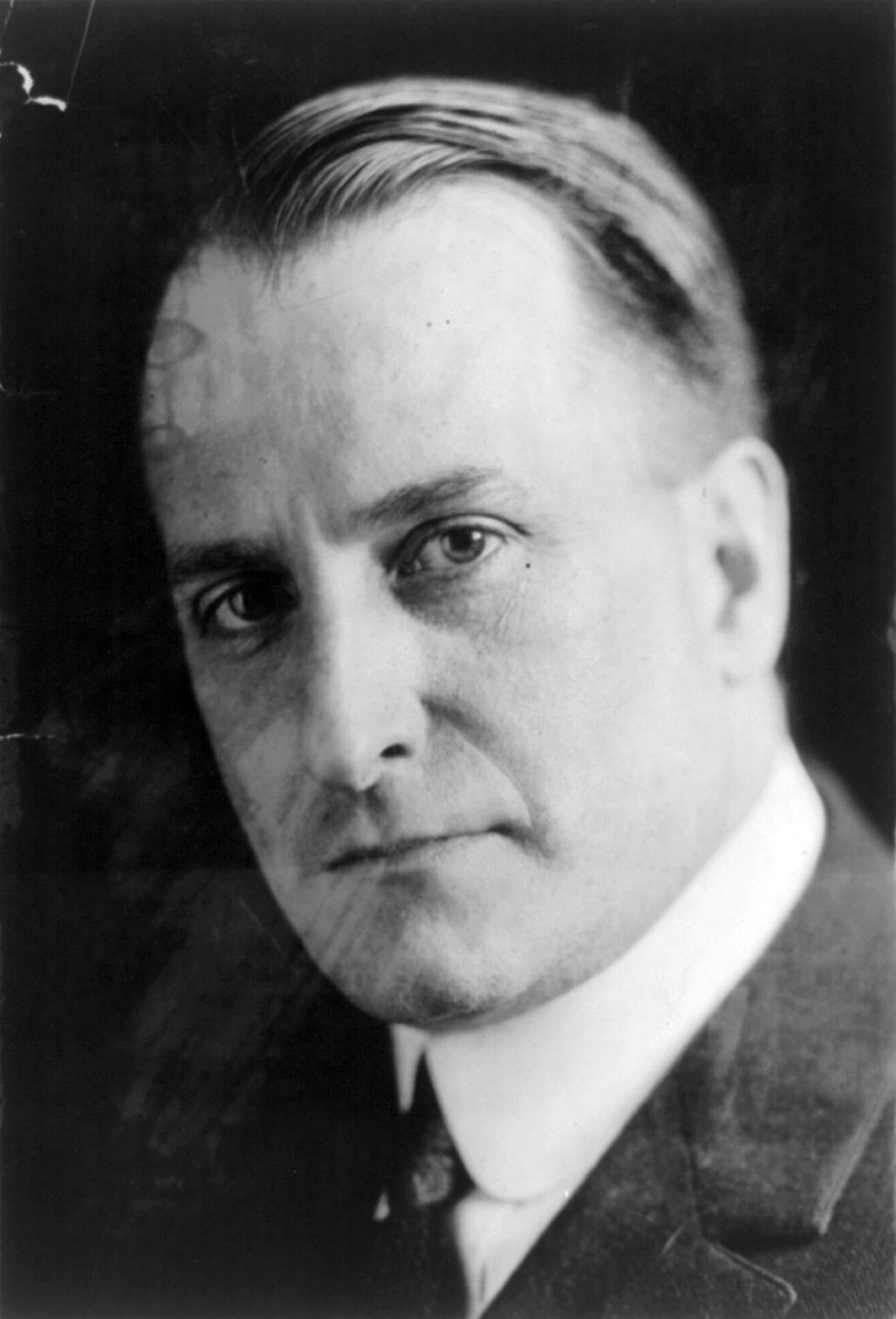
David A. Salmon, 1922

David Aden Salmon (1879 – March 15, 1960) was a career government functionary in the U.S. Department of War and the U.S. Department of State. In 1931, Salmon rose to head the State Department's Bureau of Indexes and Archives, a department with over 150 employees at the time. In 2008 Cold War historian John Earl Haynes identified Salmon as "Willy", a codename for a Soviet agent, followed by a 2009 book which argued that Salmon was, from 1934 until early 1937, a paid source of classified diplomatic and military information which ended in the hands of Soviet intelligence. This identification has been challenged by at least one historian specializing in espionage history.

== Life and career ==
=== Early years ===
David A. Salmon was born in 1879 in Connecticut.

=== Government career ===
Salmon joined the U.S. Department of War in 1896 as a junior clerk. His efficient work attracted the attention of Elihu Root, under whom Salmon worked at the War Department from 1899.

In 1905 Root brought Salmon with him to the State Department he assumed the role of Secretary of State. Salmon became known as an expert in cryptography and had supervisory control over the State Department's code room. He was in charge of coded communications from the various major international conferences of the era, often traveling with the American delegations.

In 1916, Salmon was named head of the State Department's Bureau of Indexes and Archives. This bureau was restructured in 1931, becoming the State Department's Division of Communications and Records, of which Salmon was again named as chief. Salmon supervised over 150 employees in his department's expanded incarnation, making it the largest State Department sub-agency of the day.

As an expert in State Department communications, Salmon was called before a grand jury on December 8, 1948, to authenticate documents produced by Whittaker Chambers to support his espionage accusations against State Department employee Alger Hiss.

Salmon retired from government service sometime after World War II.

=== Espionage allegations ===
In May 2009, American historians John Earl Haynes and Harvey Klehr and Russian journalist Alexander Vassiliev published a book entitled Spies: The Rise and Fall of the KGB in America. In this thick tome, the three identified David A. Salmon as a key State Department source of classified documents code-named "Willy" by his Soviet handlers.

The identification of Salmon as "Willy" was challenged by Russian historian Svetlana Chervonnaya, who asserted that the American historians had been "tricked by the odd collection of records to which their Russian source, Vassiliev, had access." Chervonnaya asserted that the Soviet's agent-group leader Ludwig Lore had falsely claimed Salmon as his source to his Soviet handlers so as to throw them off the trail of his actual source and particularly of the fact that he was himself rewriting information from "lower level clerks at the Communications and Records Division." After enhancing the information which he received with his own interpretive content, Lore then pocketed the handsome monthly stipend which was purportedly destined for the top-ranking official Salmon, Chervonnaya explains.

Chervonnaya indicates that in February 1937 Lore's deception was discovered by Soviet intelligence when they rented an apartment across the street from Lore and began round-the-clock surveillance.

As the basis for her conclusions, Chervonnaya cites the published work of J.N. Kobiakov, former high official (Major General) of the KGB foreign intelligence, which was based on Ludwig Lore case file:

"Throughout the whole period of surveillance, he left his home only once, for four hours. For three nights running, [Lore's] study was bustling with work, with the participation of all the family members; in particular, [Lore's] wife and son were taking turns at the typewriter typing something. When providing us with the materials, [Lore] repeated his usual lies about a trip to Washington and meetings with sources. * * *

"With the results of physical surveillance, the Centre arrived at a preliminary conclusion, that [Lore] was an exceptionally talented compiler. The use of information from open sources, fishing in them for any new data, as well as their analysis and evaluation, often produce outstanding results; many intelligence services do not neglect this method of information-gathering. But such work is considered auxiliary to the main task — obtaining information from agent sources... * * *

"The situation was aggravated in late spring 1937, when the Soviet 'illegals' managed to ascertain that the 'Willie' and 'Daniel' whom Lore had presented to his Soviet handlers, were 'dummies.'"

Chervonnaya's conclusions, which were initially presented on her behalf by Jeff Kisseloff on May 20, 2009, at a conference hosted by the Wilson Center, have been rejected by a number of academics. Mark Kramer, director of the Harvard Cold War Studies program, stated in response that he did not "trust a word [Kobiakov] says." In an article published a few days earlier David Garrow, a historian of the civil rights movement, accepted as fact that Salmon "handed over reams of classified information simply for the money."

According to Chervonnaya, on the other hand, conclusive proof of David Salmon's misidentification as the source known variously as "Willie" and "11th" appears in the published archival notes made by former KGB officer and historian Alexander Vassiliev. Vassilliev read the case file of Laurence Duggan, a Soviet source at the State Department with a cover name "19th", which included a May 14, 1937, letter of Soviet intelligence's Moscow Center to its New York station chief Boris Bazarov in which the Center asked if Duggan could provide more materials "regarding the US data on the Soviet military-naval supply orders." These notes are followed by Vassiliev's notation in brackets, that apparently was his brief summary of Bazarov's response to the Center's request: "The actual '11' didn’t give '19' the folder, because these materials should not be of interest to 19.”

It follows from Vassiliev's notation that by mid-May 1937 the Soviets have already ascertained the identity of Lore's actual source at the State's Division of Communications and Records.

=== Death and legacy ===
Salmon died on March 15, 1960, at the age of 81.

Following the publication of Haynes, Klehr, and Vassiliev's book in May 2009, some in the mainstream media made Salmon's name a watchword for those who "handed over reams of classified information simply for the money." It is in this capacity, regardless of whether the accusation is with or without merit, that Salmon's name is currently remembered.

== See also ==
- KGB
- Ludwig Lore
