= Sammons =

Sammons is a surname. Notable persons with that surname include:

- Albert Sammons (1886–1957), English violinist, composer and teacher
- Angie Sammons, English 20th-21st century journalist
- Ashley Sammons (born 1991), English footballer
- Bryan Sammons (born 1995), American baseball player
- Clint Sammons (born 1983), American baseball player
- Greg Sammons (born 1987), English rugby union footballer
- Jeffrey Sammons (born 1949), American historian
- Jeffrey L. Sammons, American literary scholar
- Mary F. Sammons (born 1946), American business executive, CEO of Rite Aid and former CEO of Fred Meyer
- Michelle Sammons (born 1987), South African tennis player
- Pamela Sammons (born 1956), English academic in the field of education
- Richard Sammons (born 1961), American architect and academic
- Sampson Sammons (1722–1796), American Revolutionary War officer
- Thomas Sammons (consul) (1853–1935), United States Consul General in Asia and Australia
- Thomas Sammons (politician) (1762–1838), American politician

== See also ==
- Salmon (surname)
- Salmons (surname)
- Sammon (surname)
