= Ilya Salman =

Ilya Salman may refer to:

- İlyas Salman, Turkish actor
- Ilya Salmanzadeh, Swedish-Iranian musician

== See also ==
- Salman (name)
