= Selmon =

Selmon is a surname. Notable people with the surname include:

- An American family prominent in American football:
  - Lucious Selmon (born 1951), older brother; college and professional nose guard, later a coach
  - Dewey Selmon (born 1953), younger brother; former linebacker
  - Lee Roy Selmon (1954–2011), youngest brother; former defensive end and college athletics administrator
  - Zac Selmon (born 1984), son of Dewey; college tight end, college athletics administrator
- Kenny Selmon (born 1996), American track and field athlete (no known relation to any of the above)

== See also ==
- I-4/Selmon Expressway Connector, a toll road in the city of Tampa, Florida, US
- Lee Roy Selmon Expressway, an all-electronic, limited access toll road in Hillsborough County, Florida, US
- Salman (disambiguation)
- Salmon
- Selman (disambiguation)
- Solomon
- Sulman
