= Salmanov =

Salmanov (Russian: Салманов) is an Azerbaijani and Russian masculine surname, its feminine counterpart is Salmanova. It is a slavicisation of the Arabic male given name Salman. It may refer to

- Anar Salmanov (born 1980), Azerbaijani football referee
- Farman Salmanov (1931–2007), Azerbaijani geologist
- Vadim Salmanov (1912–1978), Russian composer
