= The World Weekly =

- Type: Weekly
- Format: Online newspaper
- Publisher: Rory O'Grady (Director, 2012)
- Editor-in-chief: Manuel Langendorf (2018)
- Founded: 2012
- Ceased publication: 2018
- Political alignment: Liberalism, centrism
- Language: English
- Headquarters: London

The World Weekly was an international online magazine created in November 2012. The founding editor was James Geary and the founding managing director Rory O'Grady. The magazine ceased publishing in June 2018.

== Origins ==
Incorporated in August 2012, The World Weekly began publishing in January 2013 with 75,000 print copies being distributed at corporate venues, members' clubs and transport hubs around London. It was backed by Roland Rudd, Lord Mervyn Davies and Lord Jonathan Marland, among others.

Much like other free newspapers, The World Weekly was handed out on the streets of London. The plan was to distribute a freemium print edition first in London, before expanding to Hong Kong and New York City, with the aim of establishing a presence in 45 major cities.

Rory O'Grady described The World Weekly as an independent publication without any "specific political ideology" or "religious/non-religious view" with a "multidimensional" approach to news, saying it was "a new journalistic experiment". Originally the magazine had rotating editors rather than one chief editor.

== Content ==
The World Weekly started out in 2012 aiming at translating content from international news providers and "building a global network of stringers". It aimed to provide international news including non-Western points of view, with both free and premium services, targeting elite business, airlines and hotels.

Apart from The World Weekly's founding editor James Geary in 2012, the editor-in-chief in 2014 was Salman Shaheen. Shaheen described the journal's team as "very multicultural from all over the world" and aimed to "cut through the Western bias of big news organisations and get around entrenched political positions", and to "give readers the bigger picture".

In 2014, The Good Web Guide described The World Weekly as a "slick aggregator" that offered "original analysis". In 2015, its free service included retransmission of "leading" (according to Media Diversity Institute) media articles and content from think tanks and professional blogs.

In 2015, The World Weekly was briefly taken offline by what was believed to be a DDoS hacker attack over its critical coverage of Recep Tayyip Erdogan. At the time, editor-in-chief Salman Shaheen said the magazine "will not be silenced or intimidated".

Shaheen left in 2017. His successor Manuel Langendorf, later a European Council on Foreign Relations visiting fellow, was the magazine's editor-in-chief until it ceased publishing in June 2018. The World Weekly Media Ltd was dissolved in October 2019.

== Editors ==
The World Weekly ceased publishing in 2018 after a six-year run. The editors were:

- 2012–2014: James Geary, Cathy Galvin, Peter Guest, Karen Bartlett
- 2014–2017: Salman Shaheen
- 2017–2018: Manuel Langendorf
