= Svetlana Chervonnaya =

Svetlana Chervonnaya may refer to:

- Svetlana Chervonnaya (political historian) (born 1948), Russian and American historian specializing in the political history of the Cold War
- Svetlana Chervonnaya (art historian) (1936–2020), Russian and Polish historian specializing in Tatar art and also writing on Georgian-Abkhaz conflict
