= John Salmon =

John Salmon may refer to:

- John Salmon (bishop) (died 1325), bishop of Norwich
- John Salmon (politician) (1808–1873), New Zealand politician
- John Salmon (entomologist) (1910–1999), New Zealand scientist and academic at Victoria University College, world authority on springtails
- John Salmon (advertising executive) (1931–2017), British advertising executive
- John Salmon (cricketer) (born 1934), Australian cricketer

== See also ==
- John Salmond (1881–1968), British military officer
- John Salmond (judge) (1862–1924), New Zealand legal scholar and judge
- John Salmons (born 1979), American former professional basketball player
