= Salmon (given name) =

Salmon is a masculine given name which may refer to:

- Salmon (biblical figure), a descendant of Abraham and ancestor of David
- Salmon Brown, two people related to American abolitionist John Brown:
  - Salmon Brown (1802–1833), his younger brother
  - Salmon Brown (1836–1919), his youngest son
- Salmon P. Chase (1808–1873), American politician and jurist
- Salmon Fletcher Dutton (1870–1931), American businessman and lieutenant colonel
- Salmon Portland Chase Halle (1866–1949), American businessman and philanthropist
- Salmon Levinson (1865–1941), American lawyer and peace activist responsible for drafting the Kellogg–Briand Pact
- Salmon Morrice (1672–1740), Royal Navy officer and Vice-admiral of the White

== See also ==
- Salmon (surname)
- Salman (name), given name and surname
