= Salman Shaheen =

British politician and author

Member of Hounslow Council
- Incumbent
- Assumed office 8 May 2018

Personal details
- Born: December 1984 (age 41) Norwich, England
- Party: Labour
- Education: Jesus College, Cambridge; University of East Anglia
- Occupation: Politician • Journalist
- Website: https://salmanshaheen.com/

Salman Shaheen (born December 1984) is a British politician, journalist, and novelist.

== Early life ==
Shaheen was born in Norwich and grew up in Suffolk. He graduated with a Bachelor of Arts (BA) in Social and Political Sciences from Jesus College, Cambridge and later a Master of Arts (MA) in Creative Writing from the University of East Anglia.

== Political career ==
In 2018, Shaheen was elected as a Labour Party councillor for the Isleworth ward in the London Borough of Hounslow. He is Cabinet Member for Culture, Leisure, and Public Spaces on Hounslow Council.

In 2022, Shaheen launched 'Grow for the Future', a policy to turn neglected land into educational food growing spaces paired with schools in deprived urban areas.

'Grow for the Future' has been endorsed by actor Jim Carter who opened the first site with Shaheen in 2024 and called on other councils to introduce similar initiatives in their own boroughs. The scheme received backing from the UK government and the Greater London Authority, with funding from the UK Shared Prosperity Fund. One orchard in Brentford was planted in partnership with Brentford FC.

Shaheen was also involved in the campaign to preserve Park Road Allotments in Isleworth. The allotments, historically used to provide food for soldiers returning from World War I, faced potential development by the Duke of Northumberland. The proposed plans were rejected by the Planning Inspectorate in 2023 due to concerns about the impact on heritage assets.

In 2024, Shaheen partnered with celebrity chef Jamie Oliver to launch a primary school food education programme to tackle childhood obesity and health inequalities by teaching cooking skills to children and their families.

In 2024 and 2025, Shaheen defended Gunnersbury Estate (2006) CIC in the London Borough of Hounslow from criticism by local residents who expressed significant concerns about the growing number of music festivals held in Gunnersbury Park. He is a trustee of the Gunnersbury CIC. He has also previously declared receiving tickets to events in this and other parks.

After Hounslow Council faced criticism from some residents who said that the policy to replace cash parking meters with a pay-by-phone system was not inclusive, Shaheen introduced card parking meters in 2024.

== Journalism career ==
In 2014, Shaheen was editor-in-chief of The World Weekly. He has bylines in The Guardian, New Statesman, Huffington Post, Byline Times, and Times of India.

== Literary work ==
Shaheen’s debut novel, Freebourne, will be published by Roundfire Books, an imprint of Collective Ink.
