= Sammon (surname) =

Sammon is a surname. Alternative spellings are Sammons, Salmon and Salmons.

== Notable persons with that surname ==
- Bill Sammon (contemporary), American journalist
- Conor Sammon (born 1986), Irish professional footballer
- John J. Sammon (1876–?), American politician from New York
- Liam Sammon (born 1946), Gaelic football player and manager
- Marty Sammon (1977–2022), American keyboardist
- Patrick Sammon (born 2003), American swimmer
- Seán Sammon (1947–2022), American Superior General of the Marist Brothers
- Peggy Shannon (1907–1941; born Winona Sammon), American actress

== See also ==
- Salmon (surname)
- Salmons (surname)
- Sammons
