= David Salmon =

David Salmon may refer to:

- David Salmon (racing driver), former British racing driver
- David Salmon (tribal chief) (1912–2007), Alaska native and Episcopalian priest
- David A. Salmon (1879–1960), US State Department functionary
