= Salmons (surname) =

Salmons is a surname. Alternative spellings include Salmon, Samons, Sammons, and Sammon. The name may refer to:

- Geoff Salmons (born 1949), British football player
- John Salmons (born 1979), American basketball player
- Melissa Salmons (born 1958), American writer
- Stanley Salmons (born 1939), British scientist
- Steven Salmons (born 1959), American volleyball player
- Tony Salmons (born 1957), American comic book artist

== See also ==
- Salmon (surname)
- Sammon (surname)
- Sammons
