= Adam Salmon =

American scientist

Adam Salmon is the Associate Director of Sam & Ann Barshop Institute for Longevity & Aging Studies, and Professor of Molecular Medicine and the Joe. R. and Teresa Lozano Long Distinguished Chair in Metabolic Biology at the University of Texas San Antonio. He also serves as Co-Director of the San Antonio Nathan Shock Center of Excellence in the Basic Biology of Aging.

Salmon attended the University of Nebraska, Lincoln in Lincoln, Nebraska where he received his bachelor's and master's degrees in Biological Sciences in 1997 and 2000, respectively. He then moved to the University of Michigan Ann Arbor, where he received his PhD in Cellular and Molecular Biology in 2007. He continued as a postdoc at the University of Texas San Antonio until 2011, when he joined the faculty.

Salmon is serving from 2025-2026 as President of the American Aging Association, the largest scientific society devoted to the study of the biology of aging in the United States of America. In 2018 he was elected as a Fellow of the American Aging Association. Since 2023, he has co-directed the San Antonio Nathan Shock Center of Excellence in the Basic Biology of Aging with Dr. Randy Strong. Since 2015, Salmon has served on the Editorial Board of the Journals of Gerontology Biological Sciences.
