= Sulman =

Sulman may refer to:

- George William Sulman (1866–1938), Ontario merchant and political figure
- Florence Sulman (1876–1965), English-Australian author and educationalist
- John Sulman (1849–1934), Australian architect
- Khalifah ibn Sulman Al Khalifah (1936–2020), the Prime Minister of Bahrain

== See also ==
- Darkha Sulman Khel, town and union council in the Khyber-Pakhtunkhwa province of Pakistan
- Sir John Sulman Medal, New South Wales architectural prize
- Sir John Sulman Prize, one of Australia's longest running art prizes
