= Ashley Sammons =

English association football player

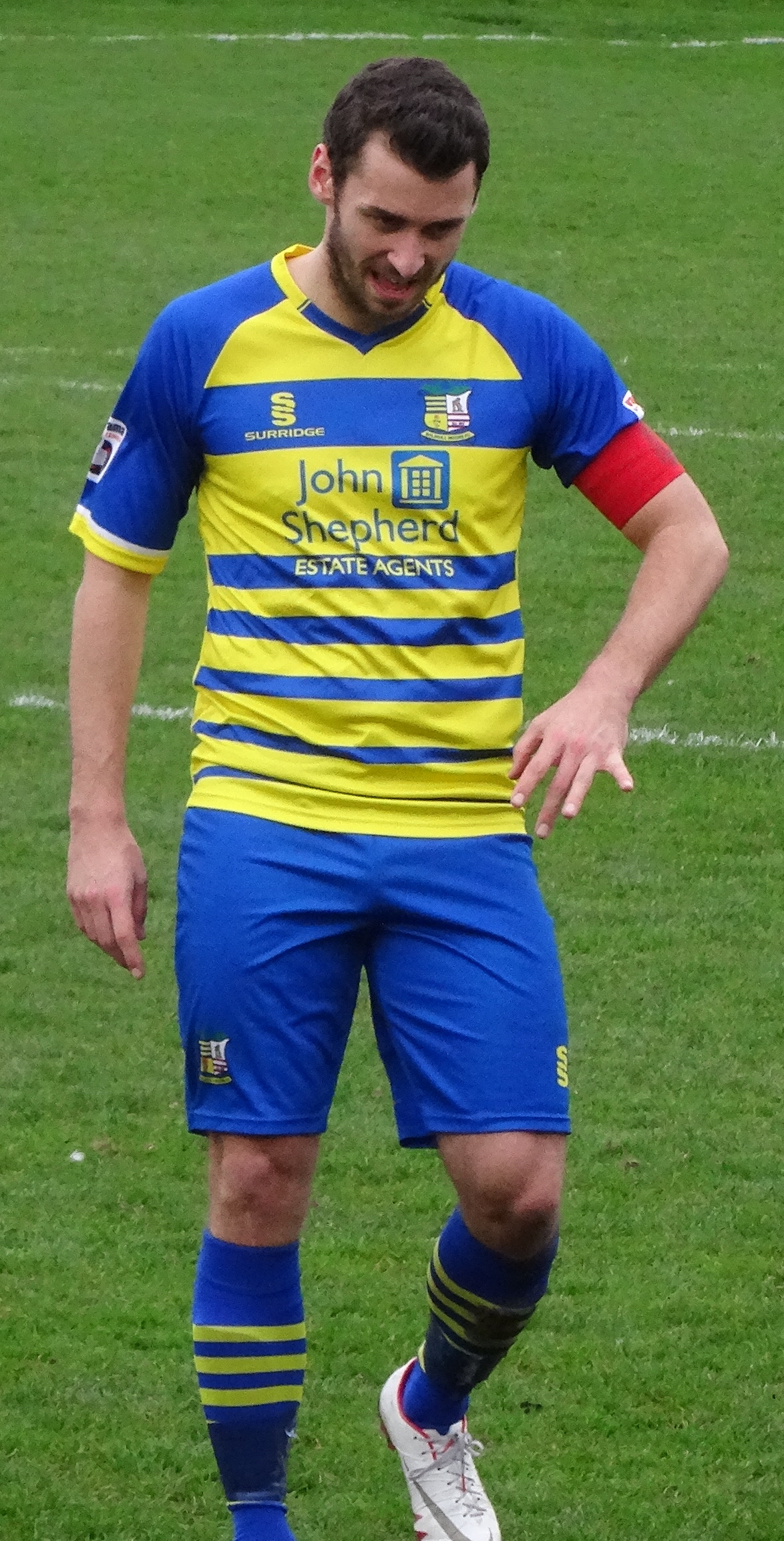
- Sammons playing for Solihull Moors in 2017

Personal information
- Full name: Ashley George Sammons
- Date of birth: 10 November 1991 (age 35)
- Place of birth: Solihull, England
- Height: 5 ft 9 in (1.75 m)
- Position: Midfielder

Team information
- Current team: Evesham United

Youth career
- –2008: Birmingham City

Senior career*
Years	Team	Apps	(Gls)
2008–2012	Birmingham City	0	(0)
2012	Hereford United	9	(1)
2012–2013	Worcester City	2	(0)
2013	Redditch United	7	(2)
2013	Worcester City	2	(0)
2013–2015	Redditch United	76	(30)
2015	Corby Town	14	(7)
2015–2016	Redditch United	31	(11)
2016–2017	Hednesford Town		
2017–2018	Solihull Moors	14	(0)
2017–2018	Redditch United (Note: Initially joined on dual registration)		
2018–2020	Rushall Olympic		
2020–	Stratford Town		
2023–	Evesham United		

International career
2007	England U17	3	(0)
- * Club domestic league appearances and goals as of 24 February 2019

Ashley George Sammons (born 10 November 1991) is an English footballer who plays as a midfielder for Evesham United.

Sammons began his career with Birmingham City, for whom he made only one appearance, in the League Cup. He moved into non-league football with Hereford United, Worcester City, Redditch United (three spells), Corby Town and Hednesford Town before joining National League club Solihull Moors in 2017. He then joined Redditch for a fourth time, initially on a dual registration, in November 2017, and left Moors in January 2018.

He represented his country at under-17 level.

== Club career ==
Sammons joined Birmingham City's youth academy after being spotted playing for his local under-10s team. He progressed through the academy teams, playing for the under-18s while still a schoolboy, and was in the starting eleven for the 5–0 victory over Burton Albion in the final of the Birmingham Senior Cup; though nominally a reserve team, several first-team players were included. In November 2008 Sammons signed his first professional contract, to expire in the summer of 2011. He was given a squad number and included among the substitutes for the FA Cup match against Wolverhampton Wanderers in January 2009, but remained unused. He captained the under-18 team to the semi-final of the 2008–09 FA Youth Cup, in which they lost 6–1 on aggregate to their Liverpool counterparts; Sammons scored Birmingham's goal, "curling a 30-yard shot" past the Liverpool goalkeeper.

Though included in the squads for pre-season friendlies, he did not initially receive a squad number for the 2009–10 season. After manager Alex McLeish named only six of the permitted seven substitutes for the League Cup match at Southampton, because they "could fill the squad with younger players that have just stepped up from the Academy but they're not ready", Sammons told the Birmingham Mail that he disagreed, feeling that he, Jordon Mutch and Mitchell McPike were all capable of playing first-team football. Three weeks later he was named on the bench for the Premier League match at Hull City, but again remained unused. He made his first-team debut in the starting eleven for the League Cup third-round match at Sunderland on 22 September 2009. McLeish described the player as "a disciplined passer of the ball [who's] got good energy", stressing that although he didn't "just want to throw young players jerseys every time we have an injury crisis", in this case it was deserved.

He made no further first-team appearances before a knee injury disrupted his 2010–11 season, at the end of which he signed a new one-year contract. He was released when that contract expired at the end of the 2011–12 season.

On 10 August 2012, Sammons signed for Football Conference club Hereford United. He was released by Hereford on 8 October 2012 after making nine appearances and scoring one goal.

Sammons then joined Conference North club Worcester City on 27 December 2012. After a short stay with Worcester City, Sammons left to join Redditch United in March 2013. Sammons left Redditch United in June 2015 for National League club Corby Town, but returned to Redditch in November.

Sammons signed for Hednesford Town on 21 May 2016. He left the Pitmen in January 2017, reuniting with his former boss Liam McDonald at Solihull Moors. He then joined Redditch for a fourth time, initially on a dual registration, in November 2017, and left Moors in January 2018.

On 3 July 2018, Sammons completed a move to Southern League Premier Central club Rushall Olympic on a one-year deal, and again was reunited with his manager at Redditch United and Solihull Moors, Liam McDonald.

In March 2023, he joined Southern League Division One South side Evesham United.

== International career ==
As a 15-year-old, Sammons played three matches for the England under-17 team in the 2007 Nordic Tournament, against their Icelandic, Finnish and Swedish counterparts.

== Personal life ==
Sammons was born to Bryan and Kim Sammons in Solihull where he attended Langley School. His older brother Greg played rugby union for Leicester Tigers.

== Honours ==
Birmingham City

- Birmingham Senior Cup: 2008
