= Salman Rawaf =

British-Iraqi doctor and medical researcher

Salman Rawaf is a professor of public health at Imperial College London. He is the director of Imperial's World Health Organization Collaborating Centre (WHOCC) for Public Health Education and Training, established in 2007 as part of the School of Public Health. He is notable for his work on global health, having served as WHO advisor to governments in the Middle East and elsewhere, including on response committees during the COVID-19 pandemic. He was a member of the WHO's HRH Leadership Hub, advising the WHO in regards to their HRH curriculum. Most of his earlier career was spent in paediatric and public health training and directorships in the UK’s National Health Service (NHS).

== Biography ==
Between 1988 and 2009, Rawaf served as Director of Public Health for Wandsworth in south-west London, as well as Merton and Sutton in 1998–99. Since then, he has worked as a professor of public health at Imperial College London and as the director of the university’s WHO Collaborating Centre.

Across his career he served on several WHO advisory boards consulting on global health initiatives, including work in the Eastern Mediterranean. During the COVID-19 pandemic he advised the governments of Iraq and the United Arab Emirates. In research, Rawaf has over 600 publications and is an Honorary Professor at King Saud University in Saudi Arabia and Ghent University in Belgium.

Rawaf is the founder and editor-in-chief of the journal Public Health Medicine. He is also an executive founder of the Arab Public Health Association, and is the current President of the International Association of Medical Colleges.

In 2015 Rawaf was awarded a Life Achievement Award in Healthcare Excellence by the Indus Foundation, an Indian non-profit promoting higher education.
