= Peter Salmon =

Peter Salmon may refer to:

- Peter Salmon (filmmaker) (born 1976), New Zealand based film and television writer/director
- Peter Salmon (judge) (born 1935), New Zealand judge who chaired the Royal Commission on Auckland Governance
- Peter Salmon (producer) (born 1956), British television producer and executive
- Peter Salmon (swimmer) (1929–2003), Canadian swimmer
- Pete Salmon (born 1992), Jamaican cricketer
