= James Geary =

American writer and journalist (born 1962)

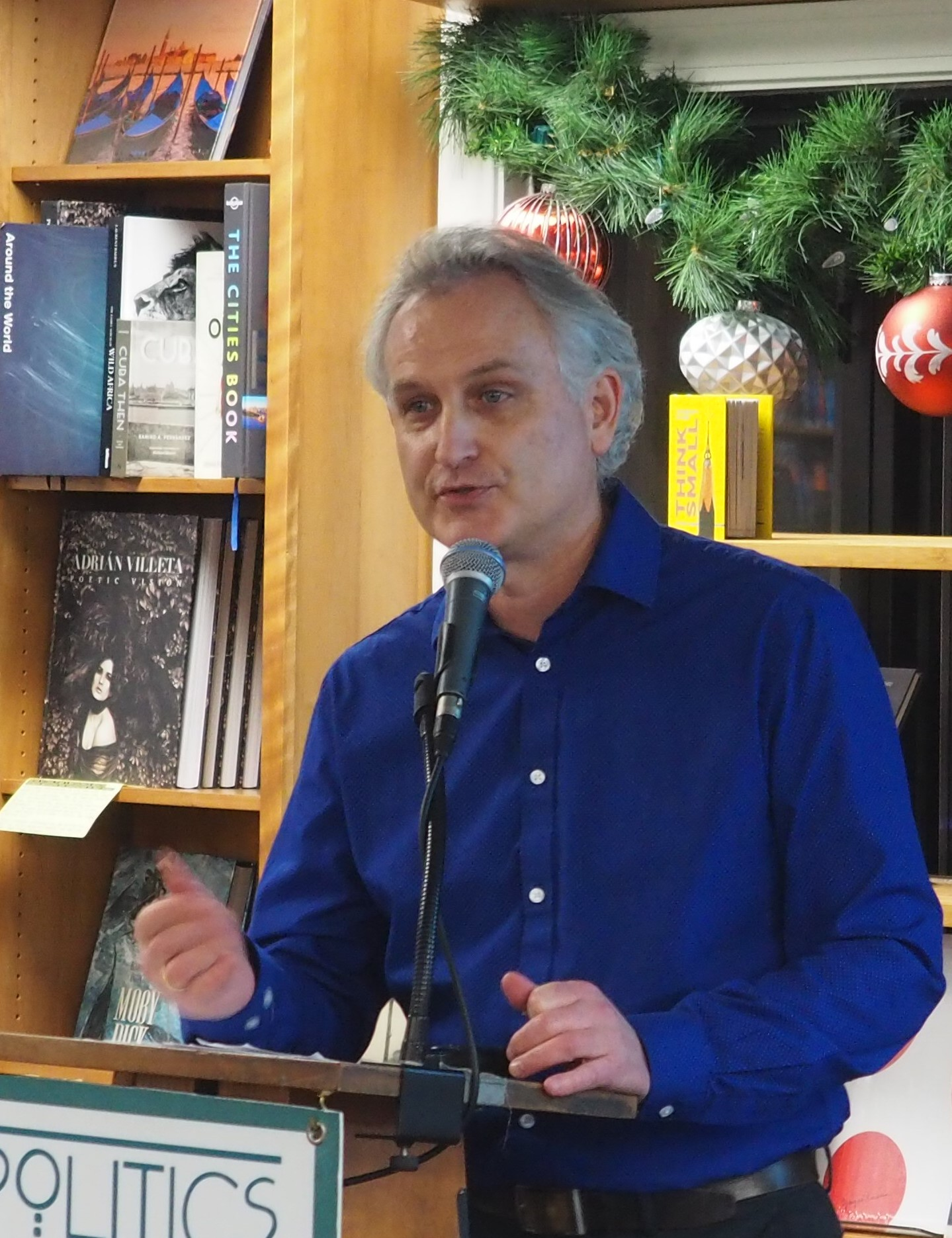
- Geary in 2019
- Born: 1962 (age 63–64)
- Education: Bennington College
- Writing career
- Genre: non-fiction
- Notable work: Nieman Reports

James Geary (born 1962) is an American writer, former Europe editor of Time and deputy curator of the Nieman Foundation for Journalism at Harvard. In this role he is also editor of Nieman Reports, oversees other Nieman print and online publications and manages a range of duties related to the Nieman Fellowship program and the foundation's journalism outreach efforts.

Among his journalistic credits, apart from his work at Time, Geary was Editor at Large for Ode magazine and writes online for The Huffington Post, Salon.com and the Certified Financial Planner Board of Standards Inc's Newsletter.

== Career ==
Geary graduated from Bennington College. He teaches at the Harvard Extension School.

Geary's literary efforts include Geary’s Guide to the World's Great Aphorists (2007), claimed to be the largest collection of aphorisms in the English language, and follows on from his previous volume on aphorists and aphorisms, The World in a Phrase (2006). It was published in the UK as We Are What We Think. It has also been published in Brazilian Portuguese – as O Mundo em uma Frase – and Korean. He also wrote a popular science book called The Body Electric (2002), a survey of cybernetic projects attempting to replace or enhance human biological senses (also published in Spain as El Cuerpo Electrónico), and two much earlier books of poetry written while he was a student in San Francisco, 17 Reasons Why and Words for Refrigerator Doors.

Geary wrote I Is an Other: The Secret Life of Metaphor and How It Shapes the Way We See the World (2011), described on his website as "a fascinating look at metaphors and their influence in every aspect of our lives, from ordinary conversation and commercial messaging to news reports and political speeches". The book has also been translated into Mandarin Chinese.

Geary publishes a blog about aphorisms, All Aphorisms, All The Time. He is a regular speaker at literary festivals where he gives a largely unscripted lecture on aphorisms which includes his juggling routine.

== Family ==
He is married with three children.

== Works ==
- The Body Electric: An Anatomy of the New Bionic Senses, Rutgers University Press, 2002 ISBN 978-0813531946
- The World in a Phrase: A Brief History of the Aphorism, Bloomsbury, 2005 ISBN 978-1582344300
- We Are What We Think: A Journey Through the Wisest and Wittiest Sayings in the World, James Geary, 2005 ISBN 978-0719561344
- Geary’s Guide to the World's Great Aphorists, Bloomsbury, 2007 ISBN 978-1596912526
- I Is an Other: The Secret Life of Metaphor and How It Shapes the Way We See the World, Harper, 2011 ISBN 978-0061710285
- Wit's End: What Wit Is, How It Works, and Why We Need It, W. W. Norton, 2018 ISBN 9780393254945
