= Edward Salmon (cricketer) =

English cricketer (1853–1907)

Edward Henry Pearse Salmon (23 December 1853 – 1 February 1907) was an English first-class cricketer active 1876–79 who played for Middlesex and Marylebone Cricket Club (MCC). He was born in Madras; died in Cliftonville.
