= John Salmon (cricketer) =

Australian cricketer

Personal information
- Full name: John Lionel Salmon
- Born: 31 March 1934; Canterbury, Victoria, Australia
- Died: 22 May 2021 (aged 87); Stawell, Victoria, Australia

Domestic team information
- Years: Team
- 1953–1959: Victoria
- Source: Cricinfo, 2 December 2015

John Lionel Salmon (31 March 1934 – 22 May 2021) was an Australian cricketer. He played fifteen first-class cricket matches for Victoria between 1953 and 1959 as an opening bowler.

== See also ==
- List of Victoria first-class cricketers
