= Alexander Vassiliev =

Russian-British espionage historian (born 1962)

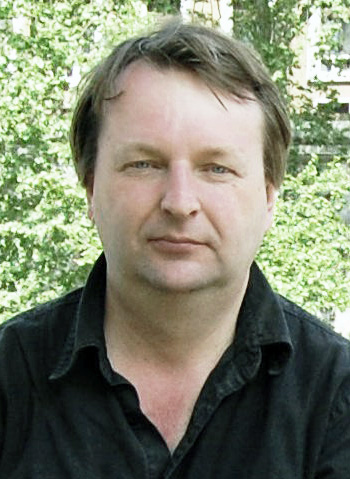
- Alexander Vassiliev
- Born: May 1, 1962 (age 64); Moscow, RSFSR, USSR
- Education: Moscow State University
- Writing career
- Language: Russian, English
- Period: 1983–present
- Genre: Espionage
- Subjects: Soviet intelligence, Russian intelligence
- Notable works: The Haunted Wood (1999), Spies (2009)
- Website: portfolio.vassiliev.org

Alexander Yuryevich Vassiliev (Note: Also transliterated as Vassilyev or Vasilyev) (Russian: Александр Юрьевич Васильев; born 1962) is a Russian-British journalist, writer, and espionage historian living in London who is a subject matter expert in the Soviet KGB and Russian SVR. A former officer in the KGB, he is known for his two books based upon KGB archival documents: Spies: The Rise and Fall of the KGB in America, co-authored with John Earl Haynes and Harvey Klehr, and The Haunted Wood: Soviet Espionage in America: the Stalin Era, co-authored with Allen Weinstein.

== Biography ==
=== Early life ===
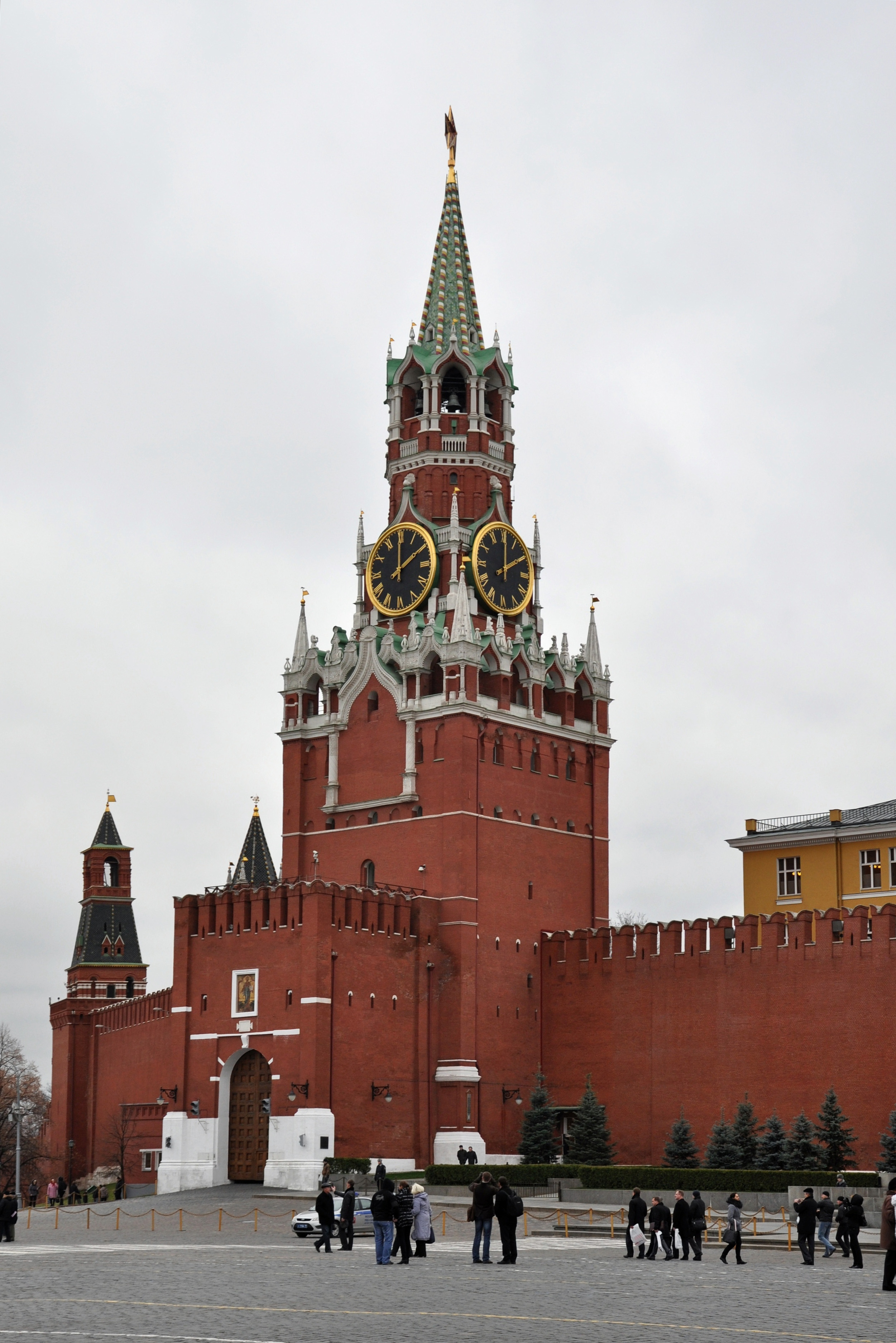
Spasskaya Tower (1491) in Moscow, where Vassiliev was born

Vassiliev was born in Moscow, Russian SFSR on May 1, 1962. He joined the Communist Party of the Soviet Union (CPSU) in 1983 while he was a student at Moscow State University (MGU). He graduated from MGU with a degree in journalism in 1984. Vassiliev worked in the international department of Komsomolskaya Pravda (Young Communists' Truth) from 1984 to 1985. In 1985, he became a student in the Andropov Red Banner Institute of the KGB of the Soviet Union (USSR), completing his studies there in 1987.

=== Soviet intelligence ===
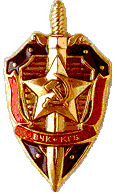
KGB symbol

Vassiliev worked as an operative of the First (American) Department of the First Chief Directorate of the KGB from 1987 to 1990. In February 1990, Vassiliev resigned from the KGB for political and moral reasons. He resigned from the CPSU in that same year. He returned to the editorial staff of Komsomolskaya Pravda, where he worked as a reporter and then columnist, writing mostly about international issues and espionage from 1990 to 1996. He also worked as an author and presenter of several political shows on the Ostankino Channel One from 1991 to 1993.

In the summer of 1993, Vassiliev received a telephone call from Iurii Kobaladze, press officer of the Foreign Intelligence Service (SVR) of the Russian Federation, requesting a meeting. Kobaladze asked Vassiliev to participate in a book project with Crown Publishers, a division of Random House, which had arranged for a five-book series based upon KGB archival documents, each edited by one Russian and one American editor. The SVR (successor to the KGB), was in the midst of a budgetary crisis and sought to improve its image as an effective service and had agreed to the proposal. Although having misgivings, Vassiliev finally agreed to work on a book dealing with Soviet Espionage in America in the 1930s and 1940s as part of the project.

In the fall of 1993, Vassiliev signed a book contract and met the American chosen by Crown to work with him, historian Allen Weinstein, a specialist in the Alger Hiss spy case. Vassiliev quit his television job and in early 1994 began to work on the book project in earnest, working with archival documents provided at the press bureau of the SVR.

Documents housed in SVR archives were carried to Vassiliev at the SVR press office; he was allowed to make copious notes both summarizing and transcribing their content in the presence of two SVR officers. Although locked up in a safe each night with the archival material, no one checked what he was writing and Vassiliev was allowed to take notebooks home as he filled one and brought in another. A total of eight notebooks were kept, along with a number of unbound pages. Vassiliev later recalled that he attempted to transcribe as many documents as possible verbatim and painstakingly noted archival file and document numbers for each.

The writing of draft chapters for Vassiliev's first book, The Haunted Wood: Soviet Espionage in America — The Stalin Era, began in 1995, with each vetted by the SVD Declassification Commission, the head of the archives department, and Kobaladze. Vassiliev was unable to name Americans who assisted Soviet intelligence in his draft chapters owing to SVR regulations which forbid the "outing" of agents and sources, so cover names were used in Vassiliev's draft. Many cover names were already well known in the United States, and Weinstein had little difficulty understanding who was who and retained control over the final draft.

Beginning in 1995, the political environment began to change in Russia, Vassiliev later recalled, with the popularity of Boris Yeltsin plummeting and an anxious mood sweeping the country. A conservative nationalistic restoration seemed to be in the offing, headed by Russian Presidential candidate Gennady Ziuganov. Adding to the difficulty, Crown Publishing found it necessary to cancel the five volume book deal for financial reasons, throwing the entire project into doubt. In January 1996, Vassiliev was informed that he would be receiving no new files from the archives.

=== Emigration ===
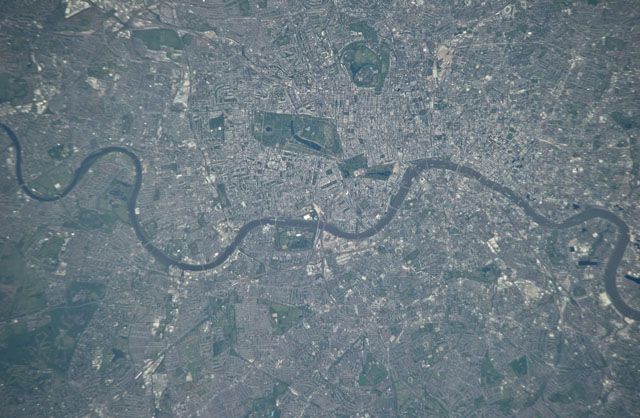
Satellite view of inner London, whither Vassiliev emigrated

Feeling a communist-nationalist restoration somewhat likely and their own safety tenuous, Vassiliev and his wife Elena decided to emigrate to Great Britain in 1996, leaving his precious notebooks with trusted friends for safekeeping rather than risking losing them to inquisitive officials at the airport. Copies of his draft chapters for The Haunted Wood were transferred to computer disks and some key documents were transcribed prior to their leaving. The resulting book based upon these materials was published in the United States by Random House in 1999. The years 2001 to 2003 were filled with two legal actions related to The Haunted Wood. After losing his cases in June 2003, Vassiliev took some time away from the bitter subject which had taken the last ten years of his life.

=== Wikipedia and new research ===
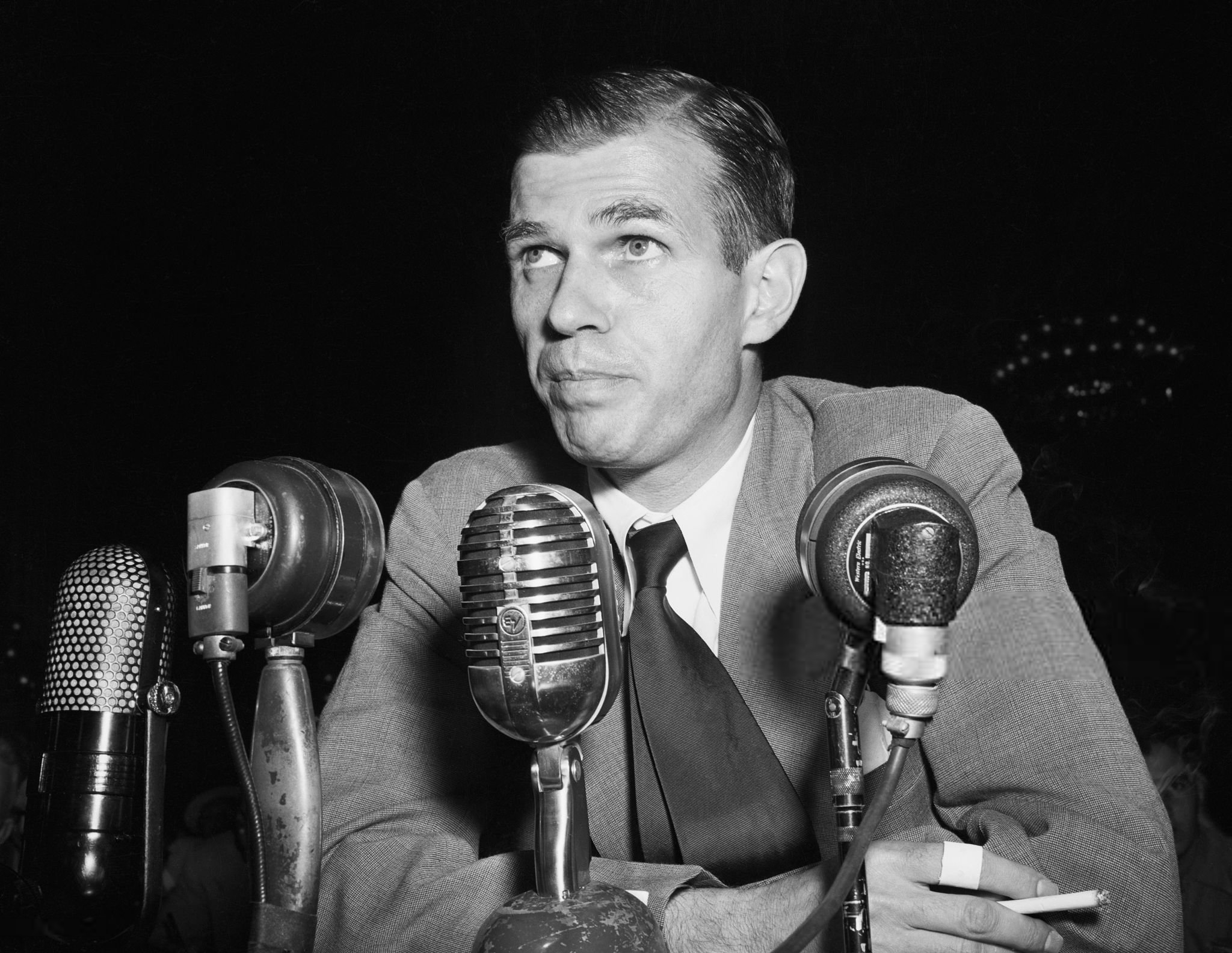
Alger Hiss in 1948

In 2005, Vassiliev became interested in Wikipedia and decided to check the article for Alger Hiss to see how accurate it was. At the end of the article was an external link to the website of historian John Earl Haynes, on which Vassiliev found a document in his own handwriting which he had introduced at his London trial, along with some comments questioning the accuracy of the document. Vassiliev wrote a letter to Haynes attempting to set the matter straight — and a book collaboration project was born.

Vassiliev managed to recover his original notebooks with transcriptions and summaries of secret Soviet foreign intelligence archival documents, and these served as the core of a second publication. In May 2009, Yale University Press published Spies: The Rise and Fall of the KGB in America, co-authored by Haynes, Vassiliev, and Harvey Klehr of Emory University, another widely recognized scholar in the field of American communist history. Upon completion of the project, Vassiliev donated his original notebooks to the U.S. Library of Congress. The contents of these were scanned in original film, transcribed into Russian, and translated into English, and are now available online in all three forms through the Cold War International History Project at the Woodrow Wilson International Center for Scholars.

=== BBC and publishing ===
Vassiliev worked in the BBC Russian Service as an online producer from 2000 to 2009. He served as a co-publisher, editor, and designer of The Hyde Park, a Russian magazine in London, from 2004 to 2006. In 2009, Vassiliev published his first novel, an espionage thriller called Russian Sector in both Russian-language and English-language editions. In 2014, he published Oblik (Look) in Russian only. He continues to work in publishing as designer, editor, producer, and publisher.

== Legal battles ==
=== Alexander Vassiliev vs Frank Cass ===
Vassiliev launched two lawsuits in association with The Haunted Wood, representing himself as a litigant in person in both cases. In July 2001, Vassiliev sued for libel Frank Cass & Co., publisher of the journal Intelligence and National Security, in the High Court of Justice in London, over the article "Venona and Alger Hiss" by John Lowenthal, published in Autumn 2000 issue of the journal. In January 2003, Frank Cass's lawyers offered Vassiliev to settle the monetary claim for more than £2,000 and promised not to republish the John Lowenthal article. Vassiliev rejected the offer. In May 2003, Frank Cass proposed to settle the case for £7,500 but Vassiliev also rejected that offer. The trial Alexander Vassiliev vs Frank Cass started on 9 June 2003 and concluded on 13 June 2003, with Judge David Eady presiding. Frank Cass prevailed on the basis of "fair comment".

== Personal ==
Vassiliev was married in 1983 and fathered a son in 1986. He was divorced in 2009.

== Works ==
=== Non-fiction ===
Vassiliev is an expert in Soviet and Russian intelligence, about which he wrote several books.

- The Haunted Wood: Soviet Espionage in America: The Stalin Era (1999)
- Spies: The Rise and Fall of the KGB in America (2009)
- Alexander Vassiliev Papers (2009) (Finding Aid)
- Vassiliev Notebooks (2009)

=== Fiction ===
- Russian Sector
- Oblik ("Look") (2014)

=== Publishing ===
As editor and publisher, Vassiliev promotes Russian classical literature by republishing more than a dozen dual-language English-Russian editions by Alexander Pushkin, Mikhail Lermontov, Nikolai Gogol, Ivan Turgenev, Leo Tolstoy, Fyodor Dostoevsky, and Anton Chekhov. He also edits and publishes French Classics in Russian by Gustave Flaubert, Alexandre Dumas Fils, Honoré de Balzac, Guy de Maupassant, Stendhal, and Marcel Proust.

== See also ==
- Soviet espionage in the United States
  - Alger Hiss–Whittaker Chambers case
  - Julius and Ethel Rosenberg case

== External sources ==
- "Alexander Vassiliev".
- "Russian Classics in Russian and English".
- "French Classics in French and English".
- "Vassiliev Notebooks". Cold War International History Project, Woodrow Wilson International Center for Scholars.
- "SECRETS, LIES, AND ATOMIC SPIES", PBS Transcript, Airdate: February 5, 2002
- Alexander Vassiliev's page on Facebook
- Amazon Alexander Vassiliev author page
- Judgment in the Case of Alexander Vassiliev vs Frank Cass, Royal Courts of Justice, London, June 13, 2003.
- John Lowenthal, "Venona and Alger Hiss," Intelligence and National Security, vol. 15, no. 3 (Autumn 2000), pp. 98–130.
  - "A Critical View of The Haunted Wood," Amazon.com, revised version.
