= Greg Sammons =

English rugby union player

- Born: Greg Sammons; 31 December 1987 (age 38)
- Height: 6 ft 0 in (1.83 m)
- Weight: 16 st 0 lb (102 kg; 224 lb)
- School: Rugby school

Rugby union career
- Position: Hooker
Senior career
| Years | Team | Apps | (Points) |
- Bedford Blues (loan)
| – | Nottingham | | |
| – | Leicester Tigers | | |
| – | Birmingham & Solihull | | |
| – | Mogliano | | |

Greg Sammons (born 31 December 1987) is an English rugby union hooker. He joined Leicester's senior squad in the 2008–2009 season from the academy. He initially joined the academy as a back rower before moving to the front row. In his youth he was a district Basketball player in Solihull.

He now plays in Italy for Mogliano. His younger brother Ashley Sammons is a professional football player for Birmingham City F.C.
