= Harry Salmon =

Harry Salmon may refer to:

- Harry Salmon (baseball) (1895–1983), American baseball pitcher in the Negro leagues
- Harry Salmon (businessman) (1881–1950), British businessman
- Harry Morrey Salmon (1892–1985), naturalist and bird photographer
