= Salman bin Khalid =

Qatari poet

- Born: January 29, 1991 (age 35); Doha
- Occupations: Poet, Lyricist and Diplomat
- Writing career
- Language: Arabic

Salman bin Khalid bin Faris bin Dari Al-Otaibi (Arabic: سلمان بن خالد بن فارس بن داري العتيبي) is a Qatari poet whose career began through the radio program "Flow of Emotions", broadcast on Qatar’s Voice of the Gulf radio station and hosted by broadcaster Adel Abdullah. The program aims to discover talents in various fields across the Persian Gulf region. His first poetry collection was published in 2017, and his second collection is expected to be released in conjunction with the Doha International Book Fair.

Salman has written numerous poems characterized by a romantic style, many of which have been published on various websites and in printed magazines. He has also written the lyrics for several Gulf songs, including "Don’t Be Upset", performed by Qatari singer Saud Jassim in 2018. To date, he has published only one poetry collection, Kloos, which was released in 2017 by Kalemat Publishing and Distribution in Doha. In 2020, Salman participated in the Diwan Al-Adham event, organized by the Qatari Ministry of Culture and Sports in collaboration with the Qatar Center for Cultural and Heritage Events and the Qatar Poetry Center.

== Poems ==
- I Don’t Think I’ll Love You Forever
- You Are in Safe Hands
- Oh, My Longing for the Past
- Fear
- O Lord, Take Me Before Him
- It Seems Separation Will Come From Us
- If I Truly Loved Myself

== Songs ==
- Don’t Be Upset – performed by Saud Jassim: 2018
- The beloved prince – dedicated to the Emir of Qatar: 2019
- And You Walk – performed by Abdulaziz Al-Ma’na: 2022
- Because It Is You – performed by Abdulqader Al-Ahmad: 2023
