= Salman Aljumaili =

Iraqi politician

Salman Aljumaili سلمان الجميلي
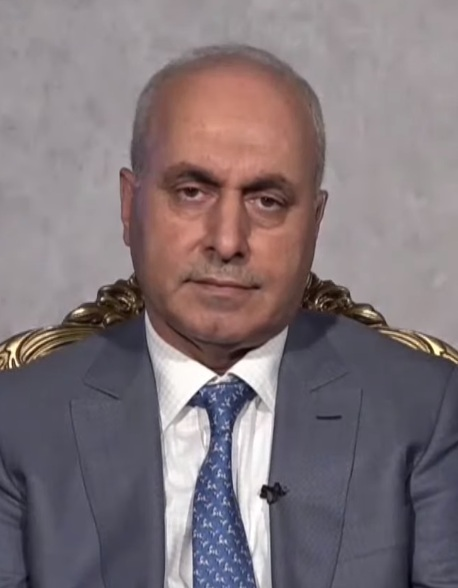
- Al-Jumaili interviewing Altaghier TV, 30 April 2021

Minister of Planning of Iraq
- In office 2014–2018

Personal details
- Born: 10 January 1963 (age 62); Fallujah, Iraq
- Profession: politician

Salman Aljumaili (Arabic: سلمان الجميلي) (born 10 January 1963) is an Iraqi politician, and Iraq's Planning Minister from 2014 to 2018.

== Biography ==
Aljumaili was born 10 January 1963 in Fallujah, Iraq. He was the Minister of Planning in the government of Haider Abadi in 2014, and was a former member of the Iraqi Council of Representatives and Chairman of the "Iraqi List" and Vice-Chairman of the Committee on Foreign Relations in the House of Representatives. He was born in Fallujah in 1963 and graduated from the Faculty of Law and Politics, University of Baghdad in 1986–87 and then received his doctorate in political science from the Nahrain University.
