= Eleanor Seely Salmon =

American geologist

- Born: February 16, 1910; Rochester, New York
- Died: September 30, 1984; New York City, New York
- Occupation: Geologist
- Known for: Petroleum geology, paleontology
- Parent: William Harry Salmon & Flora Seely Salmon

Eleanor Seely Salmon (February 16, 1910, Rochester, New York – September 30, 1984, New York City) born to Flora Seely Salmon and William Harry Salmon. She was a geologist who specialized in petroleum exploration, drilling, and refining. Although she did not have many of her own publications, she made many important contributions by editing.

== Education ==
Salmon started her education as a young girl at Columbia Preparatory School in Rochester, New York. She also attended St. Agatha's School in New York City. Although she was originally interested in studying French, with some encouragement from her first geology teacher Howard Meyerhoff, Salmon quickly discovered her passion for geology and adjusted her scholarly goals. She attended Smith College and in 1932 graduated with distinction as an undergraduate in geology. Salmon was elected into Phi Beta Kappa as well as graduating magna cum laude, both high honors for a liberal arts and her science major. In 1942, she earned her Ph.D. in geology at Columbia University.

== Career ==
After receiving her Ph.D., Salmon had difficulty finding work in the geology job market as she was not respected within the geology community because she was a woman; she decided to use her skills in chemistry to work as an analytical and specialized chemist in Brooklyn at the Vacuum Oil Company in the Technical Service Laboratory (1942–1946). Geology was largely viewed as a male profession at the time, which made it difficult for her to find a job within her desired field. However, she eventually became the managing editor of the Catalog of Foraminifera, which she had previously worked on at the American Museum of Natural History in 1942. Thirteen years later, Salmon joined the American Petroleum Institute Central Abstracting and Indexing Service in New York where she put her language skills to good use. She was required to work from English, French, German, Italian and Russian language sources while she worked as an abstractor for the Drilling and Exploration Bulletin. In 1966 Salmon went on to become the editor of the Refining Bulletin, as well as becoming the editor of an alternate energy sources bulletin. Though she had few published works of her own, Salmon excelled at editing and found satisfaction in her work. Even after her retirement in 1975, including dealing with health issues related to emphysema, Salmon continued to work freelance for the American Petroleum Institute as well as providing services as a translator for the French Bureau de Recherches Géologiques et Miniferes.

== Catalog of foraminifera ==
During Salmon's time at the American Museum of Natural History in 1942, she worked as an assistant to Angelina Messina who was a curator of micropaleontology. Together they prepared catalogs of foraminifera, which are tiny organisms that provide vital information to geologists about ancient climates within their fossilized chambers. With Salmon's help, Messina's work was internationally recognized and their 69-volume catalog of foraminifera was used in universities and in every micropaleontological laboratory for large oil companies. Their work classifying the American Museum of Natural History's foraminifera collection continues to be used by paleontologists, geologists, and climate scientists today.

== Groups and organizations ==
Salmon was a prominent member of the Geological Society of America, the American Association for the Advancement of Science, the American Association of Petroleum Geologists; though she was also a member of many groups outside of her educational and professional field. Salmon believed in equality for all, and was a member in several charities and non-profit organizations, such as the American Civil Liberties Union which aimed at protecting the rights of individuals, The Nature Conservancy which focuses on land and water conservation, and the Society of Sigma Xi, which combines both her passion for science and equality. She was also a member of the National Organization for Women, an American feminist organization.

== Publications ==
=== A Molluscan Faunule from the Pierre Formation in Eastern Montana ===
In 1934, Salmon and co-author Horace N. Coryell published a report in The American Museum of Natural History detailing the fossil findings of Theron Wasson, Chief Geologist of the Pure Oil Company. It summarizes the stratigraphy of the Pierre formation south of Glendive, Montana where the fossils were obtained, along with a more detailed lithographic description of the member in which the fossils occur, and especially of the concretions in which they are found. There is also a list of fossils of this faunule, mostly Mollusca, including a few new species. The species included in this list consist of eight Gastropoda, ten Caphalopoda, fifteen Pelecypoda (now referred to as Bivalvia, two Scaphopoda (or Tusk shells), and the two new species being ammonoid Cephalopoda, coming to a total of thirty-five species. A discussion of the classification and nomenclature of one of Meek's species of Cephalopoda is also included.

=== Salmon, Eleanor S. "Mohawkian Rafinesquinae." Journal of Paleontology, vol. 16, no. 5, 1942. ===
In September 1942, Salmon authored a paper, "Mohawkian Rafinesquinae", in the "Journal of Paleontology". In this report Salmon, talks about the species of the brachiopod genus, Rafinesquina, which have been found in the Middle Ordovician (Mohawkian). This paper is a taxonomic revision: Rafinesquina is emended and a new genus, Oepikina, is proposed. The stratigraphic utility of the taxa is discussed; species are less useful for stratigrahic correclation than species assemblages.

== Personal life ==
Salmon remained unmarried, and never had any children of her own. After she died, her funeral was held at Riverside Cemetery in Rochester, New York. Her burial plot can be found in section G of the cemetery.
