= Edward Solomon (disambiguation) =

Edward Solomon (1855–1895) was an English composer, conductor, and pianist.

Edward Solomon may also refer to:

- Edward Philip Solomon (1845–1914), British lawyer and politician in colonial South Africa
- Edward I. Solomon (born 1946), American chemist
- Ed Solomon (born 1960), American screenwriter and filmmaker

== See also ==
- Ed Salamon, American radio producer and executive.
- Edward Salomon (1828–1909), German-American politician; 8th Governor of Wisconsin
- Edward S. Salomon (1836–1913), German-American Civil War officer and 9th Governor of Washington Territory
