= Thomas Salmon =

Thomas Salmon may refer to:

- Thomas Salmon (musicologist) (1648–1706), English cleric and writer on music
- Thomas Salmon (bishop) (1715?–1759), Anglican bishop in Ireland
- Tom Salmon (priest) (1913–2013), Anglican Dean of Christ Church Cathedral, Dublin
- Thomas P. Salmon (1932–2025), Governor of the U.S. state of Vermont, 1973–1977
- Thomas M. Salmon (born 1963), his son, Auditor of Accounts in the U.S. State of Vermont
- Thomas Salmon (historian) (1679–1767), English historical and geographical writer
- Thomas William Salmon (1876–1927), American physician and a leader of the mental hygiene movement
