= Salman Zain Al Deen =

Lebanese poet, novelist and critic

- Born: Lebanon
- Occupations: Writer, Novelist, Poet, and Critic
- Notable work: Rainbow, Separate Pronouns, Scheherazade and Permissible Speech, blown novel

Salman Zain Al Deen a Lebanese poet, author, novelist and critic who also works as educational inspector. His works include poems, prose and literary criticism, especially of novels.

== Works and writings ==
His works include:

- "Lanterns and wind," poem, Dar Noufel for Publishing, 2009,
- "Supplies of the Road", poem, 2002,
- The Cage of Freedom, 2007,
- Shehrezad and the Allowed Talk, reading in women's novels, published by Arab Scientific Publishers, Inc., 2010,
- Rainbow, Nelsen Publishers, Sweden and Beirut, 2011,
- Separate Consciences, poetry collection published in 2015 by Nelsen Publishers in Sweden and Beirut, with cover and illustrations painted by the Lebanese artist Amine Al- Basha,
- "Passages," poem, published by Nelsen Publishers in Sweden and Beirut, 2016,
- Honourable Men, a critical study, Dhfaf Lebanese Publishing House and Algerian Ikhtilaf Publishing House, 2017, including a critical reading in 60 Arabic novels, the Palestinian library "Kul Shei" and Dar Kalema publishing house in Tunisia,
- "The States of Water," poem, Dhfaf Lebanese Publishing House and Algerian Ikhtilaf Publishing House, 2018,
- When Shahriar Tells the story, a reading in 50 Arabic novels, Arab Scientific Publishers, Inc., Beirut,
- I've Been Told, Majesty the King, a reading in women's novels, Arab Scientific Publishers, Inc.
- Once Upon a Time, criticism, Arab Scientific Publishers, Inc.
- In the Drift of a Novel, published by Hamad bin Khalifa University Publishing House, 2020, including critical readings of 30 Arabic novels.

== Awards ==
- Saeed Fiyadh Award for poetic creativity.
- Saeed Aqle Award for poem.
