= Park Road Allotments =

Garden allotments in Isleworth

Coordinates: 51.472°N 0.321°W

Park Road Allotments are allotments in Old Isleworth. They were managed by the local council who rented the land from the estate of the Duke of Northumberland. The allotments are recognised as an asset of community value but, in 2015 when the 100-year lease expired, they were threatened by redevelopment by the Duke, who proposed to build flats and houses upon the site while providing allotment space in nearby Syon Park. These plans were opposed by local parties such as the Isleworth Society and, on 20 June 2017, the planning committee of Hounslow council rejected them. The matter was then appealed and a public inquiry started on 9 October 2018.

== Panorama ==
Panorama of the allotments

== See also ==
- Northfields Allotments
