= Darkha Sulman Khel =

Daraka Sulman Khel Suleman khel
- Union council and town
- Country: Pakistan
- Region: Khyber-Pakhtunkhwa
- District: Lakki Marwat District
- Time zone: UTC+5 (PST)

Daraka Sulman Khel is a town and union council of Lakki Marwat District in the Khyber-Pakhtunkhwa province of Pakistan.
