= Edward M. Salomon =

American business executive (1887–1935)

Colonel Edward M Salomon (October 5, 1887 – June 12, 1935) was president and general manager of New Bry's department store in Memphis Tennessee. He was also President of the Goodfellows of Memphis, member of the Ellis Auditorium Commission, President of the Chickasaw Council, Boy Scouts of America, Colonel of the Governor's staff, President of the Sam Schloss lodge of the B'nai Brith, President of the East Memphis Civic Club, member of flood relief, and developer of New Brys Airport which resulted eventually in the Municipal Airport of Memphis. He was the nephew of Edward S. Salomon.

== Life ==
Salomon, who was Jewish, was born in Chicago, on October 5, 1888. He began his career under George Brandes as a stock boy in the Boston store, advanced to become the merchandise manager of the Omaha store, then became the basement manager of New Brys in Memphis. He was promoted a month later to president and general manager of The New Bry's Department store in Memphis Tennessee.
