= Edward Salmon =

Edward Salmon may refer to:

- Edward Salmon (soldier), 17th century soldier and MP for Scarborough
- Edward Togo Salmon (1905–1988), British ancient historian
- Edward Salmon (cricketer) (1853–1907), English cricketer
- Edward H. Salmon (born 1942), American politician in the New Jersey General Assembly
- Edward L. Salmon Jr. (1934-2016) American bishop, Episcopal Church
- Edward D. Salmon, professor, department of biology, University of North Carolina, Chapel Hill, Member US-NAS
