= Svetlana Chervonnaya (political historian) =

Russian historian

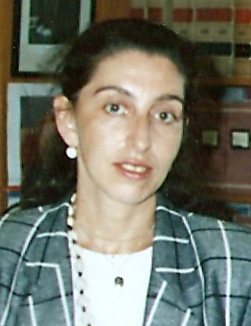
Svetlana Chervonnaya in the summer of 1990 as a visitor at Harvard University.

Svetlana Alexandrovna Chervonnaya (Russian: Светлана Aлександровна Червонная, born October 14, 1948) is a Russian historian specializing in the political history of the Cold War period and Soviet espionage activities in the United States of America. Along with Ellen Schrecker, Chervonnaya is among scholarly voices arguing against post-Soviet American triumphalism. In the post-Soviet period, Chervonnaya has worked as an investigator and producer of documentary television shows seen in the United States, Germany, and Russia.

== Early life and education ==
Chervonnaya was born in Moscow on October 14, 1948, to ethnic Jewish parents. Chervonnaya's ancestors hailed from Ukraine, Poland, and Belarus, having been forced to live in such places during Tsarist times due to antisemitic restrictions upon Jewish residence.

Chervonnaya's father was an investigator in the Procurator General's Office in Moscow, part of the People's Commissariat for Justice headed by Andrei Vyshinsky. He worked non-political cases including economic crimes, gang crimes, and homicide cases. By the time Svetlana started school, he had left the Procurator's office and became a criminal defense attorney.

A great uncle on Svetlana's mother's side, Efim Dreizer, was a victim of the Great Terror of the 1930s. He was arrested, confessed under duress, tried in the first Moscow show trial in 1936 and executed for purportedly participating in a criminal plot in the Red Army directed by Leon Trotsky. His family were treated harshly as the family of a so-called "enemy of the people" and met death and exile during the terror. They were "rehabilitated" (restored to full citizenship rights) during Khrushchev's "Thaw" of 1956–1958; Efim Dreizer was posthumously rehabilitated only in 1988, during Gorbachev's Glasnost campaign.

Chervonnaya graduated from secondary school in 1966 and enrolled in Moscow State University in the department of history, where she was admitted to the elite American history program on the basis of a competitive examination taken at the end of her second year. She specialized in the study of Franklin D. Roosevelt's New Deal and the post-World War II "New Left" in America, writing her diploma work on Malcolm X and black nationalism.

Chervonnaya married in 1970 and has two children, a daughter born in 1974 and a son born in 1987. Her husband, a physicist and mathematician, died of cancer in 1989.

== Career ==
=== Soviet period ===
Upon completion of her university work, Chervonnaya was given a post as a member of the junior research staff at the Institute for US and Canadian Studies, the leading research institute for American studies in the Soviet Union, where she concentrated in the study of American political opposition movements. After two years she was promoted to the rank of Junior Fellow and became a Senior Fellow at age 33. She was awarded the Soviet equivalent of a Ph.D. degree in 1977 and remained at the institute for three decades.

Despite her post at the Institute of the USA and Canada, Chervonnaya decided not to join the Communist Party of the Soviet Union, a fact which, combined with her Jewish heritage, made foreign travel impossible during the Brezhnev era.

Chervonnaya's initial academic work related to the study of the contemporary black and Hispanic movements in the United States, about which she published repeatedly in the leading Soviet American studies journal and in books.

Chervonnaya became interested in the spy cases of Julius and Ethel Rosenberg and Alger Hiss in the 1980s, at a time when such topics were regarded as off-limits in the USSR. Since the fall of the USSR in 1991, she has emerged as one of the preeminent specialists on the Espionage history of the USSR and the United States. In this capacity, Chervonnaya has been a consultant and contributor to a number of television documentaries, working as Associate Producer and research historian of "The Rosenberg File: Case Closed," the Moscow Field Producer of "Secrets, Lies, and Atomic Spies," as the Russian Production Coordinator of "Mystery of the U2" and other documentaries.

=== Post-Soviet period ===
After the fall of the Soviet Union in 1991, Chervonnaya worked as a freelance writer and producer of documentary television programming, participating in the production of shows for broadcast in Russia, Germany, and in the United States. In America, Chervonnaya's work has been seen on the Discovery channel (1997), A&E History Channel (1999, 2000, 2001, 2003), and PBS (1999, 2002).

In 2009, backed by a grant from The Nation Institute, a foundation associated with the American magazine The Nation, Chervonnaya launched a scholarly website on Soviet espionage in America, "DocumentsTalk." The site contains primary source documents in pdf form, biographies of leading participants, as well as interpretative discussions. Since May, 2010, she is running the website on her own.

In March and April 2010, Chervonnaya was a visiting scholar at the Kennan Institute for Advanced Russian Studies, part of the Woodrow Wilson International Center for Scholars in Washington, D.C.

== Historical disputes ==
Chervonnaya's work in the field of espionage history has been the object of some debate. From the middle 1960s onward, scholarly debate on the history of Soviet-American relations and the history of the international Communist political movement has been divided into two more or less mutually exclusive camps — "traditionalism" and "revisionism." These two interpretative constructs are highly correlated with matters of contemporary politics, with "traditionalists" apt to be believers in traditionalist conservatism and "revisionists" apt to be liberal or radical critics of militarism and nationalism.

The criticism of traditionalist historians has occasionally verged on ad hominem attacks. US Air Force historian Eduard Mark has called Chervonnaya "one of the USSR's more prolific propagandists in the twilight years of the USSR," while Haynes has similarly described Chervonnaya as a "Moscow historian/propagandist."

As a scholar who has explored recently opened archival material on espionage and rejected several interpretations of documents regarded by some "traditionalists" as axiomatic, Chervonnaya remains a somewhat controversial counter-voice to what has been called the "Cold War triumphalism" of traditionalist scholars.

== Works ==
=== Select books and chapter contributions ===
As was commonplace among academic publishing in the Soviet Union, many of Chervonnaya's publications take the form of chapters written for collective book projects:

- "American Students in the Struggle for Civil Rights and Racial Justice," in USA: Students and Politics. Moscow: Nauka, 1974.
- "The Black American Movement" and "The Chicano Movement," in Mass Movements of Social Protest in the USA. Moscow: Nauka, 1978.
- "Domestic Factors in American Policy in the Third World," in The USA and Developing Countries in 1970s. Moscow: Nauka, 1981.
- Under a Code Name and Without. With Igor Geevsky. Moscow: Novosti Press Agency Publishing House, 1985.
- Race and Ethnicity in the Social and Political Life of the USA. With Igor Geevsky. Moscow: Nauka, 1985.
- The Black Americans, in the series "Social Science Today." Moscow: 1987.
- Constitution and the Rights of American Citizens, 1787–1987. Co-editor and co-author. Moscow: Mysl, 1987.
- The Resolution of Social Conflicts: American Experience. Editor and co-author. Moscow: USA & Canada Institute publication, 1998.
- "American Mosaic, or Can there be ‘Unum’ in ‘Pluribus?'" in America Coming into the Third Millennium. Moscow: Nauka, 2000.
- American Political System: Current Dimensions. Editor-in-chief and co-author. Moscow: Nauka, 2000.

=== Select articles ===
- "The Life and Death of Malcolm X," in Modern and Contemporary History, no. 5, 1972. —co-author.
- "The Chicano Workers Effort at Labor Organizing," in Rabochii klass i sovremennyi mir (The Working Class and the Modern World), no. 5, 1976.
- "The U.S. Supreme Court and the Civil Rights," in USA: Economics, Politics, Ideology, no. 4, 1978.
- "Black Congressmen and Africa," in USA: EPI, no. 12, 1978.
- "Miami Events: Causes and Aftershocks," in USA: Economics, Politics, Ideology, no. 8, 1980.
- "The Deadlocks of Minority Politics," in USA: Economics, Politics, Ideology, no. 8, 1982.
- "The Jury in the American Court," in Soviet Justice, no. 21, 1986. —co-author.
- "The Critical Choices of Russia's Democracy," in William and Mary Bill of Rights Journal, vol. 1, no. 2 (Fall 1992).
- "American Labor in the Face of Change," in USA: Economics, Politics, Ideology, no. 9, 1993.
- "New Aspects of Labor-Management Regulation in the USA," in USA: Economics, Politics, Ideology, no. 2, 1995.
- "Protection of Minority Rights in the USA," in USA: Economics, Politics, Ideology, no. 7, 1995.
- "Where the Rosenbergs Guilty as Charged? The Soviet Ex-Agent Sheds a New Light on the Rosenberg Case," in New Times, March 23, 1997.
- "The Secrets of Arlington Hall: The Rosenberg Case through the Eyes of VENONA," in USA: Economics, Politics, Ideology, no. 8, 1997.
- "Can there be 'Unum' in 'Pluribus'? The Problems of American Identity Revisited," in USA: Economics, Politics, Ideology, no. 10, 1997.
- "'We Are Patient': Moscow Can Shed Light on the Circumstances in the Rosenberg Case." Interview with Robert Meropol. Nezavisimaia Gazeta, July 11, 1998.
- "America Through the Mirror of Impeachment," in USA: Politics, Economics, Culture, November 1999. —co-author.
- "George Bush and the American Society,” in The Changing International Context and the Place of Russia: The Materials of “Expertise” Round-Table. Moscow: Gorbachev Foundation, 2001.
- "On the Threshold of the Progressive Era," in USA: Politics, Economics, Culture, February 2001. —co-author.
- "Rudolph Abel: The Legend of the Cold War," in Nezavisimoe Voennoe Obozrenie, July 11, 2003. —co-author.
- "The Mystery of 'Ales'" (expanded web version), in The American Scholar, June 2007. —co-author.
- “The Secrets of Venona: The Case of Klaus Fuchs. An Attempt at Historical Investigation,” in: Ethik in der Wissenschaft – Die Verantwortung der Wissenschaftler. Zum Gedenken an den Atomwissenschaftler Klaus Fuchs (29.12.1911–28.1.1988). Herausgegeben von Günter Flach & Klaus Fuchs-Kittowski, Abhandlungen der Leibniz-Sozietät der Wissenschaften, trafo Wissenschaftsverlag, Berlin, 2008.
- “10 Minutes which shook the world”, "Diletant" (Moscow, Russian language), No. 7, July 2012.
- "Left Behind: Boris E. Skvirsky and the Chita Delegation at the Washington Conference, 1921–22", "Intelligence and National Security", Vol. 29, No. 1, February 2014 (on-line at "Intelligence and National Security" from April 2013.) —co-author.

=== Documentaries ===
- "The Rosenberg File: Case Closed," produced by Global American Television Inc. for Discovery Channel, 1997. —Investigator and associate producer.
- "Mystery of the U2," produced by Indigofilms for A&E History Channel, 1999. —Russian production coordinator.
- "Hugo Junkers Story," produced by Vidicom TV, Germany, 2000. —Russian field director.
- "History Undercover: Psychic Espionage," produced by Indigofilms for A&E History Channel, 2000. —Russian production coordinator.
- "Secrets, Lies and Atomic Spies," produced by WGBH and Powderhouse Productions for PBS's "Nova," 2002. —Russian field producer.
- "POW Generals (Nazi Generals in Soviet Captivity)," produced by Dialog Studio for KULTURA Channel, Moscow, 2002. —Co-writer.
- "Soviet UFO Sightings," produced by Bill Brummel Productions for A&E History Channel, 2003. —Russian field producer.
- "Rokovoe reshenie" (The Fateful Decision), produced by Studio 2V for RGTRK, Moscow. First broadcast, March 2004. —Writer and producer.
- "Russia – America," 3 parts of an 11-part documentary series, Duel’ razvedok (Duel of the Intelligence Services), produced by Studio 2V for RGTRK, Moscow, 2005. —Writer and producer.
- "Posly surovoi pory" (The Ambassadors of Stormy Times), produced by Aquila TV for TVRC, Petersburg, 2010. —Co-writer.
