= Harvey Klehr =

Historian of American communism (born 1945)

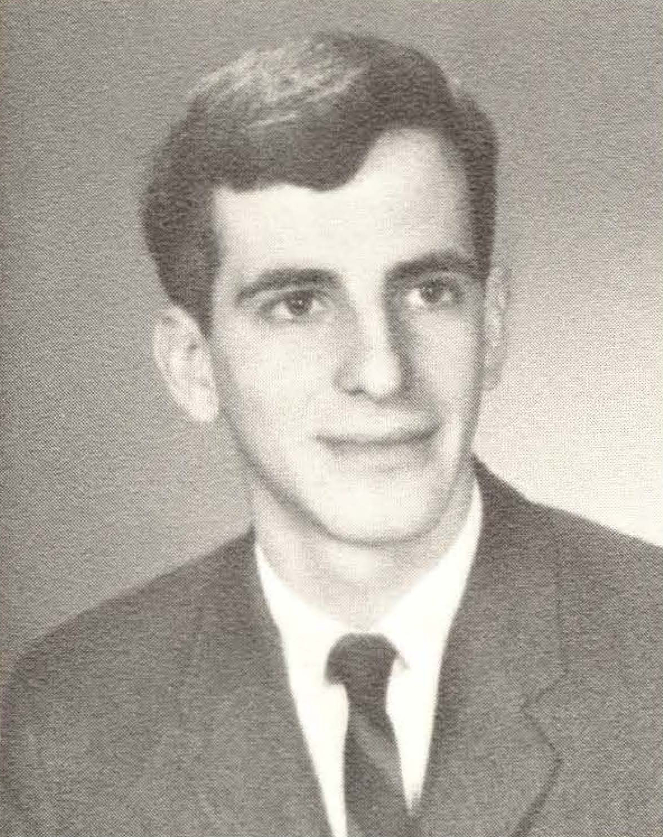
Klehr in the Franklin & Marshall College yearbook, 1967

Harvey Elliott Klehr (born December 25, 1945) is a professor of politics and history at Emory University. Klehr is known for his books on the subject of the American Communist movement, and on Soviet espionage in the United States (many written jointly with John Earl Haynes).

== Early years ==
Born in Newark, New Jersey, Klehr received his Bachelor's degree from Franklin and Marshall College in 1967. He received his doctorate from the University of North Carolina at Chapel Hill in 1971, after defending a dissertation entitled "The Theory of American Exceptionalism". Klehr later recalled that his interest in the American radical left had been shaped by the domestic political upheaval of the era of the Vietnam War during which he had attended college. In 2010, Klehr wrote:

I originally intended to study traditional American politics, but became distracted by the upheavals of the era. I considered myself on the political left, but hardly a revolutionary. Some of my friends and classmates, however, were associated with the Southern Student Organizing Committee (SSOC), a spin-off of Students for a Democratic Society ... .

Two political events from those tumultuous years gave me my lifetime research agenda. During the 1968 presidential election, a number of radicals, including some I knew, supported George Wallace for president. They certainly had no sympathy for the Alabama governor but argued that his election would precipitate an American revolution. Their rationale was that a dose of fascism would prepare the way for American radicalism. ...

After the American incursion into Cambodia in 1970, student protestors held a mass meeting on the Chapel Hill campus. A number of speakers called for a student strike to shut down the university. My advisor, Dr Lewis Lipsitz, had been one of the most prominent leftists on campus for many years. ... When Lew urged the crowd not to strike since a university should not be closed down, he was booed.

Convinced that the student left was losing its grip on reality and was likely to fail, I became increasingly intrigued by the question of why the American left always seemed to fail. What was it about America or the left that accounted for 'American exceptionalism,' the inability of socialists or communists to make inroads comparable to those it enjoyed elsewhere?

== Academic career ==
Following graduation, Klehr was hired to teach political theory at Emory University in Atlanta. After generating several journal articles from his dissertation, Klehr moved to the study of the demographic composition of the party leadership of the Communist Party, USA, agglomerating biographical information from archival study and person-to person interviews, Klehr examined the social composition of the party's leadership caste for the first time. The result of this research was a first book, Communist Cadre: The Social Background of the American Communist Party Elite, published in 1978 by the Hoover Institution Press.

Klehr's book drew the attention of Theodore Draper, a pioneering historian of American communism who had published seminal books on the topic in 1957 and 1960 on the story of the American communist movement from its origins to 1929 but had found himself unable to continue the saga into later years despite having accumulated a substantial research library on the topic. Draper pushed Klehr to continue his history to include its glory days in the years of the Great Depression. Klehr made possible the acquisition of Draper's archive by Emory University Library and began intensive study of the topic. The result was the publication of a second book in 1984, The Heyday of American Communism: The Depression Decade.

In the nearly quarter-century between the publication of Draper's second book on American communism and Klehr's 1984 effort at continuation, a new school of social historians had come to the fore in the field of American history, an unorganized group sharing a disaffection with the "traditionalist" orientation towards leaders and the machinations of high politics. These self-described "revisionists" made Klehr's 1984 work a focus of heated intellectual critique by asserting that it was an example of polemic Cold War-era anti-Communism. The highly politicized argument was returned in kind by the "traditionalists", who frequently saw in the "revisionists" and their predilection for local history and the party rank-and-file a thinly-disguised apologetic for the abuses of communism "glorifying the CPUSA, hiding its warts, and apologizing for its crimes." For more than two decades, the debate raged among historians of American radicalism, with Klehr emerging as one of the leading defenders of the "traditionalist" approach and its associated critique.

The historical approaches were largely connected to the contemporary views of their adherents, Klehr later noted:

The disagreements between the two camps were only partly generational, because some traditionalists, like myself and my long-time co-author John Haynes, were roughly the same age as our revisionist counterparts. To some degree, the combatants were divided by current political loyalties, with most revisionists locating themselves at least on the left wing of the Democratic Party, if not as members of various socialist groupings. But traditionalists themselves ranged from such self-identified socialists as Irving Howe to conservative Republicans.

== Awards ==
Klehr has received a number of awards, including Emory's Thomas Jefferson Award (in 1999). He was a member of the National Council on the Humanities, serving a term that expired in 2010.

== Works ==
- Communist Cadre: The Social Background of the American Communist Party Elite. Stanford, California: Hoover Institution Press, 1978. OCLC 4683880.
- The Heyday of American Communism: The Depression Decade. New York: Basic Books, 1984. OCLC 10456780.
- Biographical Dictionary of the American Left. Editor, with Bernard K. Johnpoll. Westport, Connecticut: Greenwood Press, 1986.
- Far Left of Center: The American Radical Left Today. New Brunswick, New Jersey: Transaction Publishers, 1988. OCLC 17210024.
- The American Communist Movement: Storming Heaven Itself. With John Earl Haynes. New York: Twayne Publishers, 1992. OCLC 25201075.
- The Secret World of American Communism. With John Earl Haynes and Fridrikh Igorevich Firsov. New Haven, Connecticut: Yale University Press, 1996. OCLC 30779937.
- The Amerasia Spy Case: Prelude to McCarthyism. With Ronald Radosh. Chapel Hill: University of North Carolina Press, 1996. OCLC 32590046.
- The Soviet World of American Communism. With John Earl Haynes and Kyrill Anderson. New Haven, Connecticut: Yale University Press, 1998. OCLC 37187391.
- Venona: Decoding Soviet Espionage in America. With John Earl Haynes. New Haven, Connecticut: Yale University Press, 1999. OCLC 44694569.
- In Denial: Historians, Communism and Espionage. With John Earl Haynes. San Francisco: Encounter Books, 2003. OCLC 62271849.
- Communism, Espionage, and the Cold War: A Unit of Study for Grades 9-12. With Robert Gabrick. Los Angeles: National Center for History in the Schools, University of California, Los Angeles, 2004.
- Early Cold War Spies : The Espionage Trials That Shaped American Politics. With John Earl Haynes. New York: Cambridge University Press, 2006.
- Spies: The Rise and Fall of the KGB in America. With John Earl Haynes and Alexander Vassiliev. New Haven, Connecticut: Yale University Press, 2009.
- The Communist Experience in America: A Political and Social History. New Brunswick, New Jersey: Transaction Publishers, 2010. —Selected articles.
- Secret Cables of the Comintern, 1933-1943. With Fridrikh Igorevich Firsov and John Earl Haynes. New Haven, Connecticut: Yale University Press, 2014.
