= John Earl Haynes =

Historian of American communism (born 1944)

John Haynes
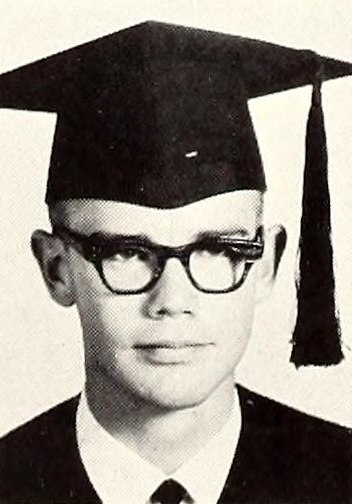
- Haynes in the Florida State University yearbook, 1966
- Born: 1944 (age 81–82); Plant City, Florida, U.S.
- Education: Florida State University; University of Minnesota
- Known for: Historian

John Earl Haynes (born 1944) is an American historian who worked as a specialist in 20th-century political history in the Manuscript Division of the Library of Congress. He is known for his books on the subject of the American Communist and anti-Communist movements, and on Soviet espionage in the United States (many written jointly with Harvey Klehr).

== Early years ==
Haynes was born on November 22, 1944, in Plant City, Florida. Haynes received his undergraduate degree from Florida State University in 1966, and his master's degree and doctorate from the University of Minnesota in 1968 and 1978, respectively.

== Career ==
During the late 1970s, Haynes served as a legislative assistant to Wendell Anderson, a Democratic Governor of Minnesota named to replace Walter Mondale in the U.S. Senate when the latter was elected Vice President of the United States. Following the dissolution of the Soviet Union during the first years of the 1990s, sensitive archives in Russia began to tentatively be opened to scholars. In 1993, in his capacity with the Manuscript Division of the Library of Congress, Haynes became the first American scholar to examine the records of the Communist Party USA, housed in the former archive of the Communist International in Moscow. Haynes was later instrumental in helping to forge a December 1998 agreement between the institutional forerunner of today's Russian State Archive of Socio-Political History (RGASPI), keeper of the Comintern documents, and the Library of Congress which led to the microfilming of the CPUSA collection and its sale to academic institutions.

== Works ==
- "The 'Rank and File Movement" in Private Social Work". Labor History, vol. 16, no. 1 (Winter 1975). doi:10.1080/00236567508584323
- "Liberals, Communists, and the Popular Front in Minnesota: The Struggle to Control the Political Direction of the Labor Movement and Organized Liberalism, 1936-1950". PhD dissertation. University of Minnesota, 1978.
- Dubious Alliance: The Making of Minnesota's DFL Party. Minneapolis: University of Minnesota Press, 1984. OCLC 10072296.
- Communism and Anti-Communism in the United States: An Annotated Guide to Historical Writings. New York: Garland, 1987. OCLC 14413516.
- The American Communist Movement: Storming Heaven Itself. With Harvey Klehr. New York: Twayne Publishers, 1992. OCLC 25201075.
- The Secret World of American Communism. With Harvey Klehr and Fridrikh Igorevich Firsov. New Haven, Connecticut: Yale University Press, 1996. OCLC 30779937.
- Red Scare or Red Menace? American Communism and Anticommunism in the Cold War Era. Chicago: Ivan R. Dee, 1996. OCLC 33208418.
- The Soviet World of American Communism. With Harvey Klehr and Kyrill Anderson. New Haven, Connecticut: Yale University Press, 1998. OCLC 37187391.
- Calvin Coolidge and the Coolidge Era: Essays on the History of the 1920s. (Editor.) Washington, DC: Library of Congress, 1988. OCLC 38426204.
- Venona: Decoding Soviet Espionage in America. With Harvey Klehr. New Haven, Connecticut: Yale University Press, 1999. OCLC 44694569.
- Files of the Communist Party of the USA in the Comintern Archives. (Editor.) IDC Publishers, 2000. —Microfilm collection.
- "The Cold War Debate Continues: A Traditionalist View of Historical Writing on Domestic Communism and Anti-Communism". Journal of Cold War Studies, vol. 2, no. 1 (Winter 2000), pp. 76–115. OCLC 90637039. JSTOR 26925044.
- In Denial: Historians, Communism and Espionage. With Harvey Klehr. San Francisco: Encounter Books, 2003. OCLC 62271849.
- Early Cold War Spies: The Espionage Trials that Shaped American Politics. With Harvey Klehr. New York: Cambridge University Press, 2006. OCLC 63171119.
- Spies: The Rise and Fall of the KGB in America. With Harvey Klehr and Alexander Vassiliev. New Haven, Connecticut: Yale University Press, 2009. OCLC 262432345.
- Secret Cables of the Comintern, 1933-1943. With Fridrikh Igorevich Firsov and Harvey Klehr. New Haven, Connecticut: Yale University Press, 2014. OCLC 861955213.
