= Magog =

Magog may refer to:

== In religion ==
- Magog (Bible), a grandson of Noah in the Old Testament
- Gog and Magog, a Biblical and Quranic pair

== Fictional people ==
- Magog, of Gog and Magog (statues) in Guildhall, London
- Magog ("Magos"), appearing with Gog ("Gos"), in Gargantua

== Places in Canada ==
- Magog, Quebec, a town
- Magog Township, Quebec, a former township
- Magog River, Quebec
- Lake Magog, Quebec
- Mount Magog, on the border between Alberta and British Columbia

== Entertainment ==
- Magog (comics), an anti-hero in DC Comics' Kingdom Come miniseries
- Magog, a 1972 novel by Andrew Sinclair
- Magog, a fallen angel in the Dresden Files novels by Jim Butcher, first appearing in Small Favor
- Guards of Magog, referenced in the song "Supper's Ready" by Genesis on the 1972 album Foxtrot
- Magog, a fictional race of beings from the TV show "Andromeda"

== Other uses ==
- HMCS Magog (K673), a Royal Canadian Navy frigate during the Second World War
- Magog, an unaccepted synonym for a genus of sponges Chondrilla (sponge)
- Magog, a nickname given within the Skull and Bones collegiate secret society
- Oaks of Avalon, a pair of oak trees known individually as Gog and Magog, Glastonbury, Somerset, England
- Gog and Magog, twin rock formations in Stewart Island / Rakiura, New Zealand
- Magog, giant of Irish myth who fathered the Partholonians and Nemedians.

== See also ==
- Gog Magog Hills, a range of hills south of Cambridge, England
- Gog (disambiguation)
