= 2009 Magog municipal election =

The 2009 Magog municipal election was held on November 1, 2009, to elect a mayor and councillors in the city of Magog, Quebec. In the mayoral contest, Vicki May Hamm was elected over incumbent Marc Poulin.

== Results ==
2009 Magog election, Mayor of Magog
Candidate	Total votes	% of total votes
Vicki May Hamm	5,649	50.41
(incumbent)Marc Poulin	4,668	41.65
Alain Vanden Eynden	890	7.94
Total valid votes	11,207	100.00

- Vicki May Hamm has a diploma in social work from the Cégep de Sherbrooke and has been involved in several public initiatives in Magog. In 2003, she campaigned for an unsuccessful proposal to undo the merger of Magog Township with the city of Magog. She was elected to the Magog municipal council in 2005, defeating incumbent councillor Michel Voyer in the city's fourth ward. She chaired the toponymy committee after the election and was responsible for overseeing street name changes in the amalgamated community. In 2006, Hamm was the only member of council to oppose a commercial re-zoning that allowed for the possible establishment of a Wal-Mart store. She won an upset victory over Marc Poulin for the mayoralty in 2009. During the campaign, she supported development in the Mont-Orford National Park. In 2010, she initiated a re-organization of Magog's administrative structure. By virtue of her position as mayor, Hamm also serves on the Memphrémagog Regional County Municipality, where she chaired the local development centre until her resignation in August 2010. In November 2010, she took part in the reconstruction of an orphanage in Haiti.
- Marc Poulin was first elected as mayor of Magog in 1998, after serving as a councillor for twelve years. The following year, he launched a significant residential development project and a December blood drive. In 2001, he promoted a merger between Magog, Magog Township and Omerville; the provincial government mandated this merger the following year, and Poulin was elected as mayor of the expanded city in December 2002. He declined an offer to run as a Parti Québécois candidate in the 2003 provincial election, saying that he was not a supporter of Quebec sovereigntism. He was re-elected to a third term as mayor in 2005, without opposition. Poulin was defeated in 2009 following a divisive campaign. He has openly criticized Vicki May Hamm, his successor, and has said that he may run for mayor again in 2013.
- Alain Vanden Eynden is a businessperson in Magog. He spoke against proposed development at the head of Lake Memphremagog in 2000, arguing that the area's tourist appeal depends on its environmental integrity. He was elected to the Magog municipal council in 2005, winning a four-way contest in the city's fourth district. In 2008, he supported a referendum initiative for a new library. In 2009, Vicky May Hamm accused Vanden Eynden of conspiring with Marc Poulin to siphon votes away from her; this accusation was rejected. In 2010, Vanden Eynden was president of the Magog Orford colors festival.

2009 Magog election, Councillor, District One
Candidate	Total votes	% of total votes
(incumbent)Michel Bombardier	585	53.77
Luc Dion	503	46.23
Total valid votes	1,088	100.00

2009 Magog election, Councillor, District Two
Candidate	Total votes	% of total votes
Yvon Lamontagne	506	46.25
(incumbent)Stéphane Simard	355	32.45
Jules Lalancette	233	21.30
Total valid votes	1,094	100.00

2009 Magog election, Councillor, District Three
Candidate	Total votes	% of total votes
(incumbent)Denise Poulin-Marcotte	accl.	.

2009 Magog election, Councillor, District Four
Candidate	Total votes	% of total votes
Olivier Tremblay	634	54.10
Perle Bouchard	538	45.90
Total valid votes	1,172	100.00

2009 Magog election, Councillor, District Five
Candidate	Total votes	% of total votes
Robert Ranger	539	42.88
Claude Bolbuc	427	33.97
Pierre Boulé	291	23.15
Total valid votes	1,257	100.00

2009 Magog election, Councillor, District Six
Candidate	Total votes	% of total votes
(incumbent)Jacques Laurendeau	accl.	.

2009 Magog election, Councillor, District Seven
Candidate	Total votes	% of total votes
(incumbent)Gilbert Kurt Boucher	accl.	.

2009 Magog election, Councillor, District Eight
Candidate	Total votes	% of total votes
Nathalie Bélanger	635	65.13
(incumbent)Gilles Robinson	340	34.87
Total valid votes	975	100.00

2009 Magog election, Councillor, District Nine
Candidate	Total votes	% of total votes
Nathalie Pelletier	745	59.13
(incumbent)Serge Gosselin	515	40.87
Total valid votes	1,260	100.00

2009 Magog election, Councillor, District Ten
Candidate	Total votes	% of total votes
Diane Pelletier	523	51.32
Patricia Tremblay	496	48.68
Total valid votes	1,019	100.00

- Diane Pelletier is a former regional director of Quebec's ministry of culture and communications. She has also served as chair of the Comite du patrimoine paysager estrien, a group devoted to preserving landscapes. Her campaign in 2009 was centred on environmental issues. She served as chair of Magog's environmental and technical services committee after the election; in 2010, she organized a municipal composting competition.

Source: Official results, Government of Quebec
