= Québec solidaire candidates in the 2008 Quebec provincial election =

Québec Solidaire fielded 122 candidates in the 2008 Quebec provincial election. One candidate, Amir Khadir, was elected. Some of the party's candidates have their own biography pages; information about others may be found here.

== Candidates ==
=== Argenteuil: Loïc Kauffeisen ===
Loïc Kauffeisen was born in Roubaix in northern France. He has a bachelor's degree in business administration from the State University of New York at Buffalo (1993), lived in Gore, Quebec from 2001 to 2008 and later moved to Saint-Jérôme. Kauffeisen is the sole owner of a bakery called La Faluche. He received 456 votes (2.09%) in 2008, finishing fifth against Liberal incumbent David Whissell.

=== Borduas: Éric Noël ===
Éric Noël is a graduate of Cégep de Sorel-Tracy in electrodynamics. He lived in McMasterville at the time of the 2008 election and was the production coordinator at an energy technology company. An avid sportsperson and amateur musician, he is also involved in campaigns for the environment and social justice. Twenty-three years old in his first campaign, he has run for Québec Solidaire in two elections.

Electoral record
| Election | Division | Party | Votes | % | Place | Winner |
|---|---|---|---|---|---|---|
| 2007 provincial | Richelieu | Québec Solidaire | 778 | 2.59 | 5/6 | Sylvain Simard, Parti Québécois |
| 2008 provincial | Borduas | Québec solidaire | 966 | 3.45 | 4/6 | Pierre Curzi, Parti Québécois |

=== Bourget: Gaëtan Legault ===
Gaëtan Legault was the founder of the Coalition to Humanize Notre Dame Street, a coalition that fought the expansion of Montreal's Notre Dame Street East in 2008. He has been a Québec solidaire candidate in two elections.

Electoral record
| Election | Division | Party | Votes | % | Place | Winner |
|---|---|---|---|---|---|---|
| Provincial by-election, 12 May 2008 | Bourget | Québec solidaire | 700 | 4.33 | 5/6 | Maka Kotto, Parti Québécois |
| 2008 provincial | Bourget | Québec solidaire | 1,180 | 4.55 | 4/6 | Maka Kotto, Parti Québécois |

=== Brome—Missisquoi: Diane Cormier ===
Diane Cormier has a background as a teacher, psychologist and administrator. In the 2008 election, she identified as an entrepreneur. A longtime supporter of Québec Solidaire, she became a party member shortly before the election. Her campaign was centred on environmental issues. She received 884 votes (2.90%), finishing fifth against Liberal Party incumbent Pierre Paradis.

=== Nicolet-Yamaska: Marianne Mathis ===
Marianne Mathis was born and raised in Saint-Sylvère, Quebec. She was a founding member of Québec Solidaire, having previously been involved in the feminist movement and Option citoyenne, and she has been a party candidate in two provincial elections. Mathis was 21 years old in 2008, and was studying for a Bachelor of Arts degree in geography at the Université Laval. She focused her 2008 campaign on agriculture, economic development, and stemming the flow of young people from the area.

In March 2009, Parti Québécois legislator Jean-Martin Aussant announced that Mathis had become a member of his office.

Electoral record
| Election | Division | Party | Votes | % | Place | Winner |
|---|---|---|---|---|---|---|
| 2007 provincial | Saint-Maurice | Québec Solidaire | 796 | 3.07 | 4/5 | Robert Deschamps, Action démocratique |
| 2008 provincial | Nicolet-Yamaska | Québec Solidaire | 950 | 4.11 | 4/4 | Jean-Martin Aussant, Parti Québécois |

=== Orford: Patricia Tremblay ===
Patricia Tremblay is a mental health nurse. Originally from the Saguenay area, she worked for a CLSC in Coaticook at the time of the 2008 election. She is also an environmental activist who has served as president of the Societe pour la conservation du Lac Lovering. In 2007, she organized a public campaign against the presence of a landfill near the head of Lake Memphremagog. She has also opposed the provincial government's decision to privatize part of Mont-Orford National Park.

Tremblay has run for Québec solidaire in two provincial elections. In 2009, she was nearly elected to a city council seat in Magog.

Electoral record
| Election | Division | Party | Votes | % | Place | Winner |
|---|---|---|---|---|---|---|
| 2007 provincial | Orford | Québec Solidaire | 1,404 | 3.58 | 5/5 | Pierre Reid, Liberal |
| 2008 provincial | Orford | Québec Solidaire | 1,128 | 3.33 | 4/5 | Pierre Reid, Liberal |
| 2009 municipal | Magog City Council, Ward Ten | n/a | 496 | 48.68 | 2/2 | Diane Pelletier |

=== Richelieu: Paul Martin ===
Paul Martin is a lifelong resident of Sorel (now Sorel-Tracy), Quebec, with over thirty years of teaching experience at the Cégep de SorelTracy. In 2003–04, he served as secretary-general of the Commission scolaire de SorelTracy. An engineer by background, he received a Ph.D. in educational science in 2007.

Martin joined Québec Solidaire shortly after its formation in 2006. He received 705 votes (2.86%) in 2008, finishing fourth against Parti Québécois incumbent Sylvain Simard.
