= Action démocratique du Québec candidates in the 2007 Quebec provincial election =

The Action démocratique du Québec (ADQ) party ran a full slate of 125 candidates in the 2007 provincial election and elected forty-one members to become the official opposition in the National Assembly of Quebec. Many of the party's candidates have their own biography pages; information about others may be found here.

== Candidates ==
=== Argenteuil: Georges Lapointe ===
Georges Lapointe (born June 7, 1948) was a Parti Québecois candidate in the 2003 provincial election and before running for the ADQ in 2007. On both occasions, he was defeated by Liberal David Whissell. He lived in Gore, Quebec during the 2007 campaign.

Electoral record
Election	Division	Party	Votes	%	Place	Winner
2003 provincial	Argenteuil	Parti Québecois	5,906	24.91	2/5	David Whissell, Liberal
2007 provincial	Argenteuil	Action démocratique	7,906	29.65	2/5	David Whissell, Liberal

=== Brome—Missisquoi: Jean L'Écuyer ===
Jean L'Écuyer was a resident of Eastman, Quebec at the time of the 2007 election. He trained as an engineer and had worked for Bell Canada for twenty-eight years. In 2002, he received a Master of Business Administration degree. During the 2007 campaign, he promoted more private sector involvement in Quebec's health system. He received 11,221 votes (31.53%), finishing second against Liberal Party incumbent Pierre Paradis. L'Écuyer became interim director-general of the ADQ in 2009.

There was a Jean L'Écuyer who ran for the Longueuil city council in 1986 and was elected to the Commission scolaire Jacques-Cartier in 1987. It is not known if this was the same person.

=== Chapleau: Jocelyn Dumais ===
Jocelyn Dumais is a cement contractor in Gatineau. He gained notoriety in the 1990s and 2000s for opposing Quebec's labour laws governing construction workers.

Dumais was raised in Lac-Bouchette, Quebec, where his father was a wealthy insurance agent. He worked in a paper mill after graduating and later moved to Kitimat, British Columbia, where he worked at an Alcan plant. He was a union member in this period and once helped to organize a strike against restrictive labour legislation. He moved to Windsor, Ontario in 1971 and worked as a unionized carpenter, and then moved to the Ottawa area in 1981 to work in construction. A newspaper article from December 1993 listed him as forty-three years old.

During the 1970s, the government of Robert Bourassa passed legislation requiring that all construction workers in Quebec be members of recognized unions or have permits from the Commission de la construction du Québec (CCQ). In 1991, Dumais was fined $35,985 for using illegal workers. He subsequently led a public campaign against the labour legislation and the CCQ, forming an organization called the Association pour le droit au travail (ADAT). In 1993 and again in 1999, Dumais and his supporters blocked all bridge traffic from Hull to Ottawa to bring attention to their campaign. He also launched a constitutional challenge against Quebec's labour laws, arguing that they violated the Canadian Charter of Rights and Freedoms by preventing Ontario residents from working in Quebec. The Supreme Court of Canada heard his case, but rejected his argument. Diane Francis, a right-wing columnist for the Financial Post, promoted Dumais's campaign over the course of several years.

Dumais has also questioned the effectiveness of Quebec's language laws, arguing that the French language could be better protected through cultural promotion. He wrote against Quebec separatism in 1994, and, when running for office in 2007, he argued that both Canada and Quebec were indivisible.

Dumas finished second against Liberal incumbent Benoît Pelletier, a senior cabinet minister in Jean Charest's government. Pelletier later announced that Quebec Ministry of Labour would recognize the Ontario work experience of Quebec construction workers, allowing more to legally enter Quebec's system. While this legislation did not meet all of Dumais's goals (e.g., workers were still required to unionize), he nonetheless supported it as a change from the previous model.

Dumais subsequently left the ADQ and supported the Quebec Liberal Party in the 2008 provincial election, appearing with Jean Charest at a campaign rally in Gatineau. He ran for city council in the 2009 Gatineau municipal election.

Electoral record
Election	Division	Party	Votes	%	Place	Winner
2007 provincial	Chapleau	Action démocratique	8,071	24.92	2/6	Benoît Pelletier, Liberal
2009 municipal	Gatineau Council, Limbour Ward	n/a	1,403	26.95	3/4	Nicole Champagne

=== Orford: Steve Bourassa ===
Steve Bourassa has been an ADQ candidate in two elections. He was twenty-nine years old in his first campaign and identified as a financial consultant. From 2002 to 2006, he was chairman of the board of directors for a multi-million dollar funeral home.

In his first campaign, Bourassa called for public consultation on proposed development at the Mont-Orford National Park and suggested monthly fundraising breakfasts to raise money for low-income children. He focused on regional development, education reform, and an outreach to seniors in the 2007 campaign. He was nearly elected in the second campaign, amid an increase in ADQ strength across the province.

In November 2007, he announced his departure from politics. His father has been a councillor in Sainte-Anne-de-la-Rochelle.

Electoral record
Election	Division	Party	Votes	%	Place	Winner
2003 provincial	Orford	Action démocratique	6,145	17.56	3/5	Pierre Reid, Liberal
2007 provincial	Orford	Action démocratique	11,798	30.09	2/5	Pierre Reid, Liberal

=== Outremont: Pierre Harvey ===
Pierre Harvey was a physician based in Rivière-du-Loup at the time of the election, specializing in C. difficile. He presented the ADQ's election promise that patients would be able to attend private hospitals at public expense if they did not receive necessary surgery due to hospital delays. Considered a strong candidate for his party, he received 2,236 votes (8.87%) for a disappointing fifth-place finish against Liberal Raymond Bachand.

He is not to be confused with a different Pierre Harvey who ran for the ADQ in the 2008 provincial election.

=== Richelieu: Philippe Rochat ===
Philippe Rochat was born in Switzerland and moved to Saint-Robert, Quebec in 1985. A dairy and cattle farmer for many years, he began working for CIT Sorel-Varennes in 2008. He finished second against Parti Québécois incumbent Sylvain Simard in 2007. He subsequently ran for mayor of Saint-Robert in 2009 and was narrowly defeated.

Electoral record
Election	Division	Party	Votes	%	Place	Winner
2007 provincial	Richelieu	Action démocratique	9,413	31.37	2/6	Sylvain Simard, Parti Québécois
2009 municipal	Mayor of Saint-Robert	n/a	419	48.05	2/2	Gilles Salvas
