= 2002 Magog municipal election =

The 2002 Magog municipal election was held on December 1, 2002, to elect a mayor and councillors in the city of Magog, Quebec. This was the city's first election following an amalgamation with two neighbouring townships.

== Results ==
2002 Magog election, Mayor of Magog
Candidate	Total votes	% of total votes
Marc Poulin	5,770	64.33
Jean-Guy St-Roch	3,199	35.67
Total valid votes	8,969	100.00

2009 Magog election, Councillor, District One
Candidate	Total votes	% of total votes
Michel Bombardier	accl.	.

2002 Magog election, Councillor, District Two
Candidate	Total votes	% of total votes
Gerald Dussault	419	60.90
Gisele Bisson	254	36.92
Gerald Deschenes	15	2.18
Total valid votes	688	100.00

2002 Magog election, Councillor, District Three
Candidate	Total votes	% of total votes
Denise Poulin-Marcotte	1,130	76.87
Serge Poulin	340	23.13
Total valid votes	1,470	100.00

2002 Magog election, Councillor, District Four
Candidate	Total votes	% of total votes
Jean-Guy Gingras	413	68.95
Jean-Yves Theriault	186	31.05
Total valid votes	599	100.00

2002 Magog election, Councillor, District Five
Candidate	Total votes	% of total votes
Michel Voyer	796	69.40
Jean-Louis Le Cavalier	351	30.60
Total valid votes	1,147	100.00

2002 Magog election, Councillor, District Six
Candidate	Total votes	% of total votes
Jacques Laurendeau	745	74.35
Marcel Lavoie	257	25.65
Total valid votes	1,002	100.00

2002 Magog election, Councillor, District Seven
Candidate	Total votes	% of total votes
Gilbert Kurt Boucher	606	61.40
Roger Crevier	381	38.60
Total valid votes	987	100.00

2002 Magog election, Councillor, District Eight
Candidate	Total votes	% of total votes
Gilles Robinson	514	52.34
Jean-Marie Bergeron	468	47.66
Total valid votes	982	100.00

2002 Magog election, Councillor, District Nine
Candidate	Total votes	% of total votes
Serge Gosselin	379	46.67
Jocelyne Mongrain	231	28.45
Raymond Cloutier	202	24.88
Total valid votes	812	100.00

2009 Magog election, Councillor, District Ten
Candidate	Total votes	% of total votes
Yvan Cote	accl.	.

Sources: Nelson Afonso, "Poulin elected to lead new city of Magog," 2 December 2002, p. 1.
