= Robert Benoit =

Canadian politician (born 1944)

- In office 1989–2003
- Parliamentary group: Quebec Liberal Party

Personal details
- Born: Saint-Hyacinthe, Quebec
- Citizenship: Canada
- Profession: University Professor

Robert Benoit (born April 11, 1944) is a Canadian politician in the province of Quebec. He served in the National Assembly of Quebec from 1989 to 2003 as a member of the Quebec Liberal Party.

== Early life and career ==
Benoit was born in Saint-Hyacinthe, Quebec and studied commerce and administration at the Collège Paul-Valéry in Montreal. He received an investment dealer's diploma in 1968 and was hired by Dominion Securities Quebec in the same year. He became active with the Liberal Party in 1978 and campaigned for the "non" side in the 1980 Quebec referendum on sovereignty.

Benoit was president of the Quebec Liberal Party from 1985 to 1989 and led the party's finance committee for at least part of this time. At the party's 1987 conference, he called for Liberals to shift from a purely economic focus and devote more attention to social issues, creating policies to benefit the homeless and unemployed. The following year, Benoit helped persuade the party's youth wing to endorse the Canada-United States Free Trade Agreement. He also supported the unsuccessful Meech Lake Accord on reforming the Canadian constitution.

For twenty-three years, Benoit was the next-door neighbour of Canadian author Mordechai Richler.

== Legislator ==
Benoit was chosen as the Liberal candidate for Orford in the 1989 provincial election, despite objections from some local organizers who regarded him as a candidate of the party establishment. He was easily elected. The Liberals won a second consecutive majority government, and Benoit entered legislature as a backbench supporter of Robert Bourassa's government. He was appointed as parliamentary assistant to the premier on November 29, 1989, and served in this position until December 14, 1993.

Benoit campaigned in Quebec's Eastern Townships in support of the Charlottetown Accord on Canadian constitutional reform in 1992. The accord was defeated in a referendum. In April 1993, Benoit said he would support a liberalization of Quebec's Charter of the French Language, which restricts the public use of languages other than French. He was re-elected in the 1994 election as the Liberals lost government to the Parti Québécois. After the election, he served as his party's critic for the environment and industry.

In 1995, Benoit supported Progressive Conservative candidate Guy Lever in a federal by-election in Brome—Missisquoi. Lever finished a distant third against Denis Paradis of the Liberal Party of Canada. Benoit later became one of the first Quebec Liberal MNAs to encourage federal Progressive Conservative leader Jean Charest to seek the Quebec Liberal leadership in 1998. Charest was eventually chosen as leader without opposition.

Benoit was elected to a third term in the 1998 provincial election. The Parti Québécois were re-elected provincially, and Benoit once again served as his party's critic for the environment. In 2002, he negotiated with Parti Québécois minister André Boisclair to secure the amalgamation of Magog, Quebec with neighbouring communities. He did not seek re-election in 2003, standing aside for star candidate Pierre Reid.

== Out of the legislature ==
After leaving the legislature, Benoit taught history at the college level and tutored in the Université de Sherbrooke's Master of Business Administration program.

Benoit strongly opposed the Charest government's decision to sell part of the Mont-Orford National Park to private developers in 2006. He helped form the group SOS Parc Mont-Orford to lobby against the sale and tried to overturn the decision via an emergency resolution within the Liberal Party.

He called for fundamental changes to the Liberal Party in 2010, saying that it had become simply "a machine for collecting money."

== Electoral record ==
1998 Quebec general election: Orford
Party	Candidate	Votes	%	±%
Liberal	Robert Benoit	21,164	50.96	−0.11
Parti Québécois	Olivier Désilets	16,248	39.12	−1.81
Action démocratique	René Forget	3,624	8.73	+2.16
Socialist Democracy	Josué Côté	352	0.85	
Natural Law	Claire Desmeules	144	0.35	−0.43
Total valid votes		41,532	100.00	
Rejected and declined votes		396		
Turnout		41,928	81.32	−1.47
Electors on the lists		51,560		
Source: Official Results, Le Directeur général des élections du Québec.

1994 Quebec general election: Orford
Party	Candidate	Votes	%	±%
Liberal	Robert Benoit	19,082	51.07	−6.41
Parti Québécois	Ginette Therrien	15,295	40.93	+8.91
Action démocratique	Michel Roy	2,454	6.57	
Natural Law	Jean-Paul Lapointe	293	0.78	
Parti économique	Carole Blouin	242	0.65	
Total valid votes		37,366	100.00	
Rejected and declined votes		554		
Turnout		37,920	82.79	+8.59
Electors on the lists		45,802		
Source: Official Results, Le Directeur général des élections du Québec.

1989 Quebec general election: Orford
Party	Candidate	Votes	%
Liberal	Robert Benoit	17,236	57.48
Parti Québécois	Henri Bourassa	9,601	32.02
Unity	Claude-M. Ostiguy	1,696	5.66
New Democratic	Denis Boissé	861	2.87
Parti 51	André Perron	594	1.98
Total valid votes		29,988	100.00
Rejected and declined votes		760	
Turnout		30,748	74.20
Electors on the lists		41,442	
Source: Official Results, Le Directeur général des élections du Québec.
