= 2005 Magog municipal election =

The 2005 Magog municipal election was held on November 6, 2005, to elect a mayor and councillors in the city of Magog, Quebec. Marc Poulin was re-elected to a third term as mayor without opposition.

== Results ==
2005 Magog election, Mayor of Magog
| Candidate | Total votes | % of total votes |
|---|---|---|
| (incumbent)Marc Poulin | accl. | . |

2005 Magog election, Councillor, District One
| Candidate | Total votes | % of total votes |
|---|---|---|
| (incumbent)Michel Bombardier | 442 | 61.99 |
| Yvon Bernier | 271 | 38.01 |
| Total valid votes | 713 | 100.00 |

2005 Magog election, Councillor, District Two
| Candidate | Total votes | % of total votes |
|---|---|---|
| Yvon Lamontagne | 233 | 50.00 |
| Bertrand Bergeron | 184 | 39.48 |
| Gisele Bisson | 49 | 10.52 |
| Total valid votes | 466 | 100.00 |

2005 Magog election, Councillor, District Three
| Candidate | Total votes | % of total votes |
|---|---|---|
| (incumbent)Denise Poulin-Marcotte | accl. | . |

2005 Magog election, Councillor, District Four
| Candidate | Total votes | % of total votes |
|---|---|---|
| Alain Vanden Eynden | 279 | 34.92 |
| Rejean Lacroix | 234 | 29.29 |
| Marcel Lavoie | 186 | 23.28 |
| Serge Poulin | 100 | 12.52 |
| Total valid votes | 799 | 100.00 |

2005 Magog election, Councillor, District Five
| Candidate | Total votes | % of total votes |
|---|---|---|
| Vicky May Hamm | 463 | 52.26 |
| (incumbent)Michel Voyer | 423 | 47.74 |
| Total valid votes | 886 | 100.00 |

- Michel Voyer is a businessperson in Magog. In the 1980s, he was president of the downtown association and the Chamber of Commerce. He is a Canadian federalist and supported the "Oui" side in the 1992 Canadian referendum on the Charlottetown Accord. He served on the Magog Township council from 1995 until its merger with Magog in 2002, when he was elected for the new city's fifth ward. He initially favoured the de-merger of Magog Township in 2004, but changed his mind following two provincial amendments to the new city of Magog's charter. He was defeated in 2005 and later served on the board of Magog's business development corporation.

2005 Magog election, Councillor, District Six
| Candidate | Total votes | % of total votes |
|---|---|---|
| (incumbent)Jacques Laurendeau | accl. | . |

2005 Magog election, Councillor, District Seven
| Candidate | Total votes | % of total votes |
|---|---|---|
| (incumbent)Gilbert Kurt Boucher | accl. | . |

2005 Magog election, Councillor, District Eight
| Candidate | Total votes | % of total votes |
|---|---|---|
| (incumbent)Gilles Robinson | 358 | 52.42 |
| Michel Pomerleau | 325 | 47.58 |
| Total valid votes | 683 | 100.00 |

2005 Magog election, Councillor, District Nine
| Candidate | Total votes | % of total votes |
|---|---|---|
| (incumbent)Serge Gosselin | 467 | 73.66 |
| Pierre Goulet | 167 | 26.34 |
| Total valid votes | 634 | 100.00 |

2009 Magog election, Councillor, District Ten
| Candidate | Total votes | % of total votes |
|---|---|---|
| Jocelyne Mongrain | accl. | . |

Sources: Patrick Lavery, "Magog mayor gets four more years: Four acclaimed to council, 16 vie for remaining seats," Sherbrooke Record, 18 October 2005, p. 3; "Meet your new municipal councils," Sherbrooke Record, 8 November 2005, p. 7.
