= Green Party of Quebec candidates in the 2008 Quebec provincial election =

The Green Party of Quebec ran eighty candidates in the 2008 provincial election, none of whom were elected. Information about these candidates may be found on this page.

== Candidates ==
=== Brome-Missisquoi: Louise Martineau ===
Louise Martineau has a Bachelor of Arts degree in politics and international relations and a Master of Arts degree in philosophy, both from the Université de Sherbrooke. She joined the Green Party in 2004 and has been a party candidate at both the federal and provincial levels. Her website features a political/poetic manifesto entitled La Flamme Sacrée du Québec.

Martineau sought the leadership of the Quebec Green Party in November 2010. She finished third against Claude Sabourin.

Electoral record
Election	Division	Party	Votes	%	Place	Winner
2004 federal	Brome—Missisquoi	Green	2,011	4.55	4/5	Denis Paradis, Liberal
2008 provincial	Brome—Missisquoi	Green	1,012	3.32	4/6	Pierre Paradis, Liberal

=== Chapleau: Roger Fleury ===
Roger J. Fleury has Bachelor of Arts, Bachelor of Social Science, and Master of Education degrees from the University of Ottawa, and is a retired teacher of history and economics. He served on the board of the Pavillon du Parc, a centre for severely disabled children located in Aylmer, until its administration was taken over by the Quebec government in the 1990s; one of Fleury's own children is severely disabled.

He has been a Green Party candidate in two elections and also ran for mayor of Gatineau in 2009. Sixty-six years old during the municipal campaign, he was president of the Coalition for Rapid Transit in the Outaouais and called for a light rail network to replace the city's planned Rapibus transitway. He also proposed a new Gatineau city square that would combine a football stadium, soccer pitch, and amphitheatre.

Electoral record
Election	Division	Party	Votes	%	Place	Winner
2007 provincial	Chapleau	Green	1,755	5.42	4/6	Benoît Pelletier, Liberal
2008 provincial	Chapleau	Green	1,032	4.04	4/7	Marc Carrière, Liberal
2009 municipal	Mayor of Gatineau	n/a	1,198	1.71	5/6	Marc Bureau

=== Orford: Louis Hamel ===
Louis Hamel is a businessperson who served on the city council of Deauville before it was amalgamated into Sherbrooke. He has been a Green Party candidate in two provincial elections. In the 2007 election, he spoke against the provincial government's sale of a part of the Mont-Orford National Park. He was forty-eight years old in 2008.

Electoral record
Election	Division	Party	Votes	%	Place	Winner
2007 provincial	Orford	Green	1,798	4.59	4/5	Pierre Reid, Liberal
2008 provincial	Orford	Green	1,026	3.03	5/5	Pierre Reid, Liberal

=== Richelieu: Patrick Lamothe ===
Patrick Lamothe was born and raised in Sorel-Tracy, Quebec. He was twenty-two years old at the time of the election and was completing a Bachelor's Degree in teaching secondary social studies at the Université du Québec à Montréal. He called for measures that would stop the exodus of young people from the Sorel-Tracy area. He received 693 votes (2.81%), finishing fifth against Parti Québécois incumbent Sylvain Simard.
