= Holy Thorn =

A Holy Thorn may refer to:

- One of the thorns from the Crown of Thorns

- Holy Thorn Reliquary, a reliquary created to hold one of the Holy Thorns

- The Glastonbury Thorn
