= Pierre Reid =

Canadian politician (1948–2021)

Member of the National Assembly of Quebec for Orford
- In office May 1, 2003 – August 29, 2018
- Preceded by: Robert Benoit
- Succeeded by: Gilles Bélanger

Minister of Government Services
- In office 2005–2006
- Succeeded by: Henri-François Gautrin

Minister of Education
- In office 2003–2005
- Preceded by: Sylvain Simard
- Succeeded by: Jean-Marc Fournier

Personal details
- Born: August 16, 1948 Jonquière, Quebec, Canada
- Died: November 14, 2021 (aged 73)
- Party: Quebec Liberal Party
- Profession: Teacher

Pierre Reid (August 16, 1948 – November 14, 2021) was a Canadian politician and educator in the province of Quebec. He served in the National Assembly of Quebec from 2003 to 2018, representing Orford as a member of the Quebec Liberal Party. Reid was a former cabinet minister in Jean Charest's government.

He is not to be confused with a senior public servant in Quebec named Pierre Reid.

== Early life and academic career ==
Reid was born in Jonquière, Quebec. He held a Bachelor of Science degree from Université Laval (1970) and a Ph.D. in mathematics from Université de Paris XI (1974).

After working as a computer consultant for IBM Canada, Reid became a professor of administrative data processing at the Université du Québec à Chicoutimi in 1976. Two years later, he joined the business administration department at the Université de Sherbrooke. He became a vice-rector of the university in 1989, and four years later he defeated Marie Malavoy to become university rector.

Reid supported the Université de Sherbrooke's links to Gaz Métropolitain, which provided a $105,000 scholarship for research in the natural gas sector. He speculated about privatizing some academic programs in 1996, to find new revenue sources in light of government cutbacks. In 2001, he welcomed a $4.7 million investment from the government of Canada to fund health researchers on campus.

Reid was appointed an associate deputy minister at Industry Canada in 2001.

== Legislator ==
=== Education minister ===
Reid was a star candidate for the Liberal Party in the 2003 provincial election and was easily elected as the Member of the National Assembly of Quebec for Orford. The Liberal Party won a majority government in this election under Jean Charest's leadership, and Charest appointed Reid as his education minister on April 29, 2003. A Montreal Gazette report from this period indicated that Reid was well regarded for his skills as a manager and administrator.

University funding

Reid made significant changes to university student funding in 2004, shifting $103 million from bursaries to repayable loans. He also announced that student loans would become easier to obtain and that repayments would be proportional to income after graduation; in some cases, graduates would not be required to make payments during periods of unemployment.

Student leaders and the opposition Parti Québécois strongly criticized the shift from bursaries to loans, describing it as a betrayal of the province's lower-income students. The Canadian Federation of Students also criticized Reid's repayment policy, with one student leader sarcastically describing it as "Study now, pay forever". Reid argued in response that his changes would allow more students to register at universities.

There were several protests against Reid's funding reforms in 2004 and 2005, including one protest in February 2005 that turned violent. Reid promised to re-invest "massive" funding into loans and bursaries after a revolt of the Liberal Party's youth wing in late 2004, but did not remain in the education portfolio long enough to carry this out.

Reid promised in November 2004 that he would maintain Quebec's long-standing university tuition freeze during the Charest government's first mandate, but would not make any commitments beyond that time.

Jewish private schools funding

In December 2004, Reid announced a new association between Quebec's public schools and Jewish private schools in a bid to improve cultural ties. This decision was made after the firebombing of one of Montreal's United Talmud Torah schools which resulted in the destruction of a library.

The following month, Quebec media sources discovered that the Charest government had agreed to pay full funding to Jewish private schools through the cultural association. This was a shift from a previous policy of funding about sixty per cent of the costs. The funding decision was made without cabinet approval or discussion; when it became public knowledge, Reid indicated that other private religious and cultural schools would also be eligible for such funding. Several public school officials, teachers groups, and parents groups criticized the decision on the grounds that it would undermine public education.

The Charest government was ultimately forced to cancel its plans following an extremely negative public reaction. While still supporting the funding change in principle, Charest acknowledged that his government had handled the matter poorly. One Montreal Gazette columnist argued that the Charest government mishandled the issue by not announcing its funding policy change from the beginning. The controversy damaged Reid's public standing.

High schools

In May 2003, Reid announced that francophone schools would start English lessons in the first grade and devote more class time to English-language education. The previous Parti Québécois government had brought English lessons forward from the fourth to the third grade, but had reduced the overall time devoted to English.

Reid announced in 2004 that persons with serious criminal records would not receive provincial teaching certificates. He dropped plans to introduce a professional teaching order after teachers voted in large numbers against the plan.

Federal initiatives

In addition to serving as provincial education minister, Reid was also appointed to a two-year term as chair of the Council of Ministers of Education, Canada in October 2003. Reid was critical of the Canadian Council on Learning introduced by Jean Chrétien's federal government, saying that its money would be better spent on provincial initiatives.

=== Government services minister and backbencher ===
Widely regarded as having mishandled the university funding and Jewish private school files, Reid was demoted to government services minister after a cabinet shuffle on February 18, 2005. An editorial in the Montreal Gazette later described this as a "make-work" position for Reid. This position offered him a much lower public profile, and he was dropped from cabinet entirely on February 27, 2006. During his time as government services minister, Reid announced that the Charest government would replace an information management system approved by the previous ministry.

Reid supported the Charest government's plan to sell part of the Mont-Orford National Park to private interests in 2006, despite the concerns of environmental groups and some Liberal backbenchers. Critics noted that Reid was the friend of a key developer who stood to benefit from the sale, although Reid responded that his friend was only one of many potential buyers.

Reid was narrowly re-elected in the 2007 provincial election, which reduced the Liberals to a minority government. He was returned to a third term in the 2008 election, as the Liberals regained majority status. He has not been returned to cabinet.

In 2010, Reid and Canadian prime minister Stephen Harper announced funding for a new arena in honour of hockey coach Pat Burns, who was suffering from and later died of terminal cancer. The arena is located in Stanstead, in Reid's Orford division.

== Death ==
Reid died aged 73 on November 14, 2021.

== Electoral record ==
2014 Quebec general election: Orford
Party	Candidate	Votes	%	±%
Liberal	Pierre Reid (incumbent)	13,055	44.09	+7.51
Parti Québécois	Michel Breton	7,767	26.23	+4.32
Coalition Avenir Québec	Marc-Alexandre Bourget	6,227	21.03	-3.12
Québec solidaire	Patricia Tremblay	2,291	7.74	+2.35
Option nationale	Denis Spick	273	0.92	-0.22
Total valid votes		29,613	100.00	
Rejected and declined votes		387		
Turnout		30,000	72.82	
Electors on the lists		41,195		
Source: Official Results (2014 election), Le Directeur général des élections du Québec.

2012 Quebec general election: Orford
Party	Candidate	Votes	%
Liberal	Pierre Reid (incumbent)	11,448	36.58
Parti Québécois	Michel Breton	9,560	30.55
Coalition Avenir Québec	Jean L'Écuyer	7,558	24.15
Québec solidaire	Patricia Tremblay	1,687	5.39
Green	Guillaume Corriveau	554	1.77
Option nationale	Marie-Hélène Martin	356	1.14
Coalition pour la constituante	Serge Trottier	134	0.43
Total valid votes		31,297	100.00
Rejected and declined votes		291	
Turnout		31,588	78.10
Electors on the lists		40,443	
Source: Official Results (2012 election), Le Directeur général des élections du Québec.

2008 Quebec general election: Orford
Party	Candidate	Votes	%	±%
Liberal	Pierre Reid	14,709	43.40	+10.12
Parti Québécois	Michel Breton	12,516	36.93	+8.47
Action démocratique	Pierre Harvey	4,516	13.32	−16.77
Québec solidaire	Patricia Tremblay	1,128	3.33	−0.25
Green	Louis Hamel	1,026	3.03	−1.56
Total valid votes		33,895	100.00	
Rejected and declined votes		425		
Turnout		34,320	61.65	−12.43
Electors on the lists		55,668		
Source: Official Results, Le Directeur général des élections du Québec.

2007 Quebec general election: Orford
Party	Candidate	Votes	%	±%
Liberal	Pierre Reid	13,050	33.28	−16.20
Action démocratique	Steve Bourassa	11,798	30.09	+12.53
Parti Québécois	Michel Breton	11,158	28.46	−3.08
Green	Louis Hamel	1,798	4.59	+3.17
Québec solidaire	Patricia Tremblay	1,404	3.58	
Total valid votes		39,208	100.00	
Rejected and declined votes		344		
Turnout		39,552	74.08	+2.66
Electors on the lists		53,391		
Source: Official Results, Le Directeur général des élections du Québec.

2003 Quebec general election: Orford
Party	Candidate	Votes	%	±%
Liberal	Pierre Reid	17,314	49.48	
Parti Québécois	Yvon Bélair	11,037	31.54	
Action démocratique	Steve Bourassa	6,145	17.56	
UFP	Véronique Grenier	498	1.42	–
Total valid votes		34,994	100.00	
Rejected and declined votes		393		
Turnout		35,387	71.42	
Electors on the lists		49,547		
Source: Official Results, Le Directeur général des élections du Québec.
