= Pierre Bélanger (volleyball) =

Canadian volleyball player (born 1952)

Personal information
- Born: 28 January 1952 (age 73); Magog, Quebec, Canada

Sport
- Sport: Volleyball

Pierre Bélanger (born 28 January 1952) is a Canadian volleyball player. He competed in the men's tournament at the 1976 Summer Olympics.
