= Vieux Clocher de Magog =

Concert venue in Magog, Quebec

Le Vieux Clocher de Magog
- Interactive map of Le Vieux Clocher de Magog
- Address: Merry Street; Magog, Quebec; Canada
- Coordinates: 45°16′04″N 72°09′19″W
- Type: Performance venue

Construction
- Opened: 1981

Website
- vieuxclocher.com

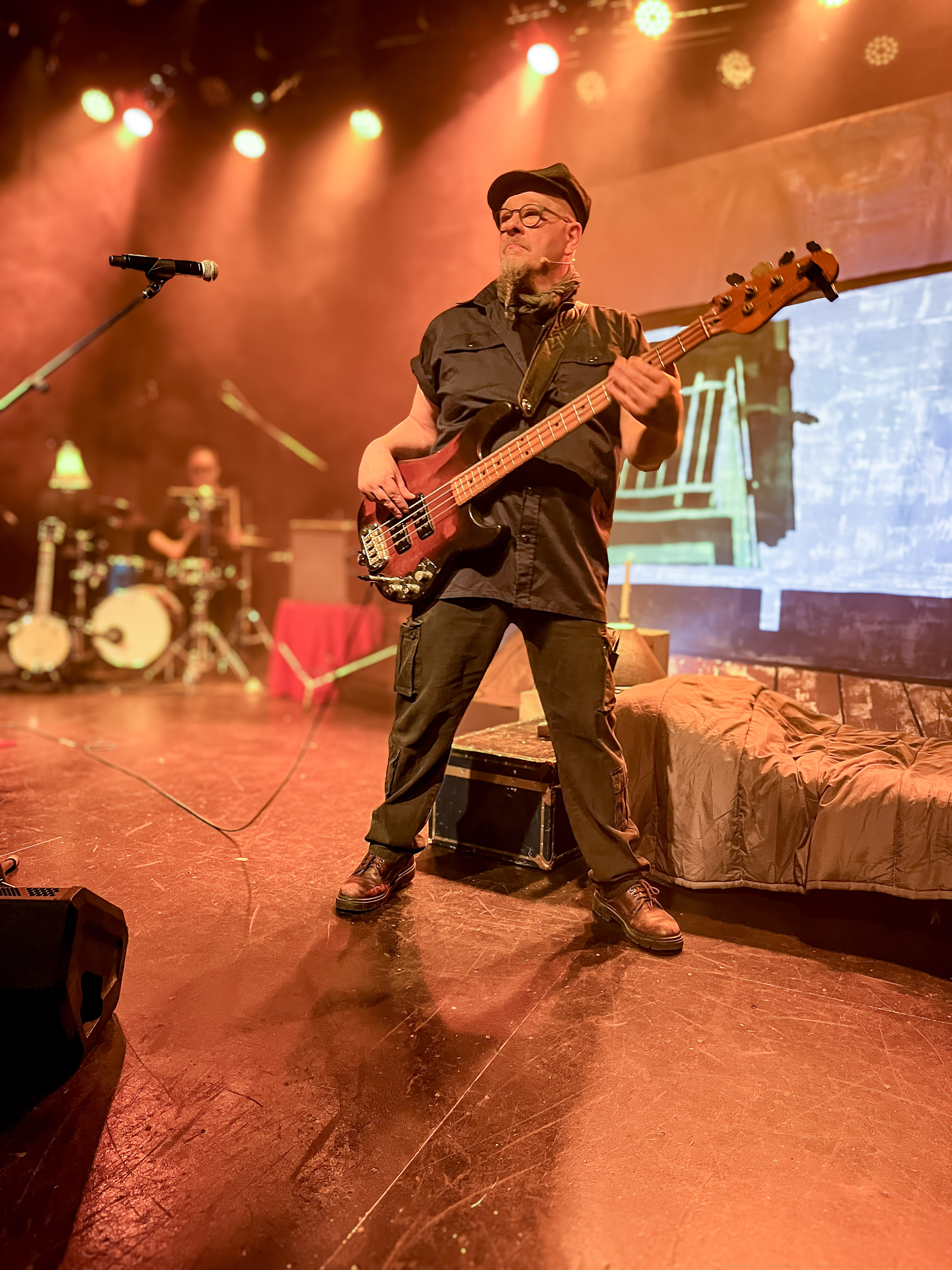
André Vanderbiest in 2025 at the Vieux Clocher de Magog.

Le Vieux Clocher de Magog (lit. 'The Old Bell Tower of Magog') is a performance venue on Merry Street in Magog, Canada. Housed in a former church, it is a recognized cultural venue for the presentation of music, comedy, and storytelling shows.

== History ==
In October 1880, Ralph Merry donated $100 to obtain the endowment of the Quebec Church Society to build an Episcopal church. It was built in 1881. The first professional show was presented there in 1974. The venue celebrated its 50th anniversary in 2024.

In 1981, the hall was acquired by Bernard-Y. Caza and his brothers, Pierre-Albert and Géraldy Guy, following an advertisement in La Tribune (Sherbrooke) indicating that an "old bell tower" was for sale. At the time, the building was in poor condition and without electricity, having been abandoned following a bankruptcy.

Obtaining the permits required to operate the venue led to a misunderstanding with municipal authorities, related in part to an application for a dance permit. The owners had to clarify that it was not a nude dancing establishment before the necessary authorizations were granted.

In its early days, the hall had approximately 200 seats, with a bar located on the lower floor. This configuration complicated service during intermissions. The bar was subsequently moved into the main hall, which adopted a cabaret format. Today, the capacity reaches approximately 400 spectators.

Le Vieux Clocher hosts a varied programme including singing, jazz, comedy, and storytelling shows. Over the years, the venue has helped bring attention to several Quebec artists, including: Richard Desjardins, Fred Pellerin, André Sauvé, Rock et Belles Oreilles, Louis-José Houde, Patrick Huard, Gilles Vigneault, Lise Dion, Jean Lapointe, Jean-Michel Anctil, Richard Séguin, France D'Amour, Stéphane Rousseau, and Michel Barrette.

Le Vieux Clocher is recognized for its intimate atmosphere and the closeness between artists and the audience.

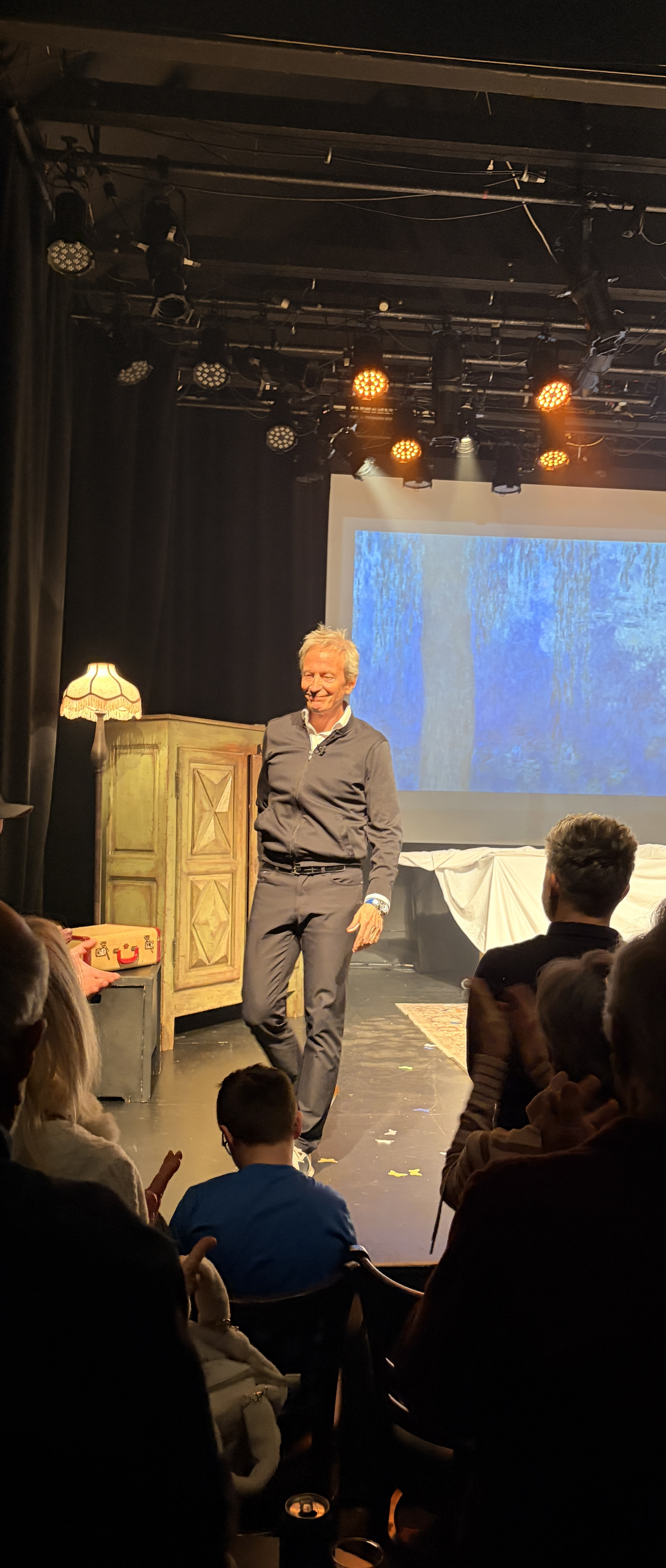
Alain Choquette in 2026 at Le Vieux Clocher de Magog.

== See also ==
- Granada Theatre (Sherbrooke)
