= Ralph Merry =

Ralph Merry, III (1753 – 1825) is known as the founder of Magog, Quebec. He was born in Lynn, Massachusetts, on March 16, 1753, and died and was buried in the Outlet, Lower Canada (now Magog, Quebec), in 1825. His grandfather, Ralph Merry, arrived in New England in the late seventeenth century from London, England. He sold his vessel, married and settled in Lynn, Massachusetts, where he had one son, Ralph II.

Ralph III married Sarah Sylvester, with whom he had eight children. He served in the American Revolution, enlisting in 1775, stationed in Lynn and nearby Salem, Massachusetts. After the war, he lived for a time in Providence, Rhode Island, and then moved to St. Johnsbury, Vermont, in 1792.

Like many Americans at the time, Merry was enticed by the prospect of land in Lower Canada, which was then being freely offered to those who would swear loyalty to the Crown. Merry purchased large tracts and settled at the Outlet on Lake Memphremagog in 1798. The village that grew from this settlement would be renamed as Magog in 1855.

Merry developed saw and grist mills on the Magog River, as well as ironworks, though these were unsuccessful due to the poor ore quality of the region. He continued to develop the village with a carpenter's shop, wool mill, and a general store that opened in 1820. By 1823 this was a stage stop on the mail route between Montreal and Stanstead. Merry built a comfortable home for his family in 1821, which still stands today as the oldest structure in Magog.

Merry died in 1825 and is interred at Pine Hill Cemetery in Magog.
