= Gog =

Gog or gog may refer to:

== Religion ==
- Gog and Magog, entities from various religious texts

== People ==
- Anikó Góg, Hungarian triathlete
- Cristian Gog, Romanian mentalist
- GOG or Genival Oliveira Gonçalves (born 1965), Brazilian rapper
- Gog, a slang term for a person from North Wales

== Places ==
- Gog (woreda), a district in Gambela, Ethiopia
- Gog, an archaic spelling of the town of Goch, North Rhine-Westphalia, Germany
- Gog Magog Hills, a hill range south of Cambridge, England, colloquially known as 'The Gogs'
- Gog and Magog, twin rock formations in Stewart Island / Rakiura, New Zealand
- Goodview Garden stop, a light rail stop in Hong Kong (MTR station code GOG)

== Fiction ==
- Gog (DC Comics), a DC Comics super-villain
- Gog (film), a 1954 3-D science fiction film by Herbert L. Strock
- Gog (Marvel Comics), a Marvel Comics super-villain and monster
- Gog (novel), a 1931 satire by Giovanni Papini
- Gog, a 1967 novel by Andrew Sinclair
- Gog and Magog ("Gos et Magos"), characters in the 16th century novels Gargantua and Pantagruel
- Gogs, an animated UK television series
- Guardians of Ga'Hoole, a New York Times best-selling book series

== Other uses ==
- GOG.com, formerly Good Old Games, an online video game retailer
- Gog (trilobite), a genus of trilobite
- Gog and Magog (statues), of Guildhall, London
- GOG Håndbold, a Danish handball club
- Gynecologic Oncology Group, a non-profit organization researching gynecological cancers
- Giovine Orchestra Genovese, music organization, concert society and cultural association, based in Genoa, Italy
- Oaks of Albion, a pair of oak trees in Glastonbury, Somerset, England, known individually as Gog and Magog

== See also ==
- Gogg, a character in the 1993 television series Cro
