= Granada Theatre (Sherbrooke) =

Canadian Theatre

- Théâtre Granada
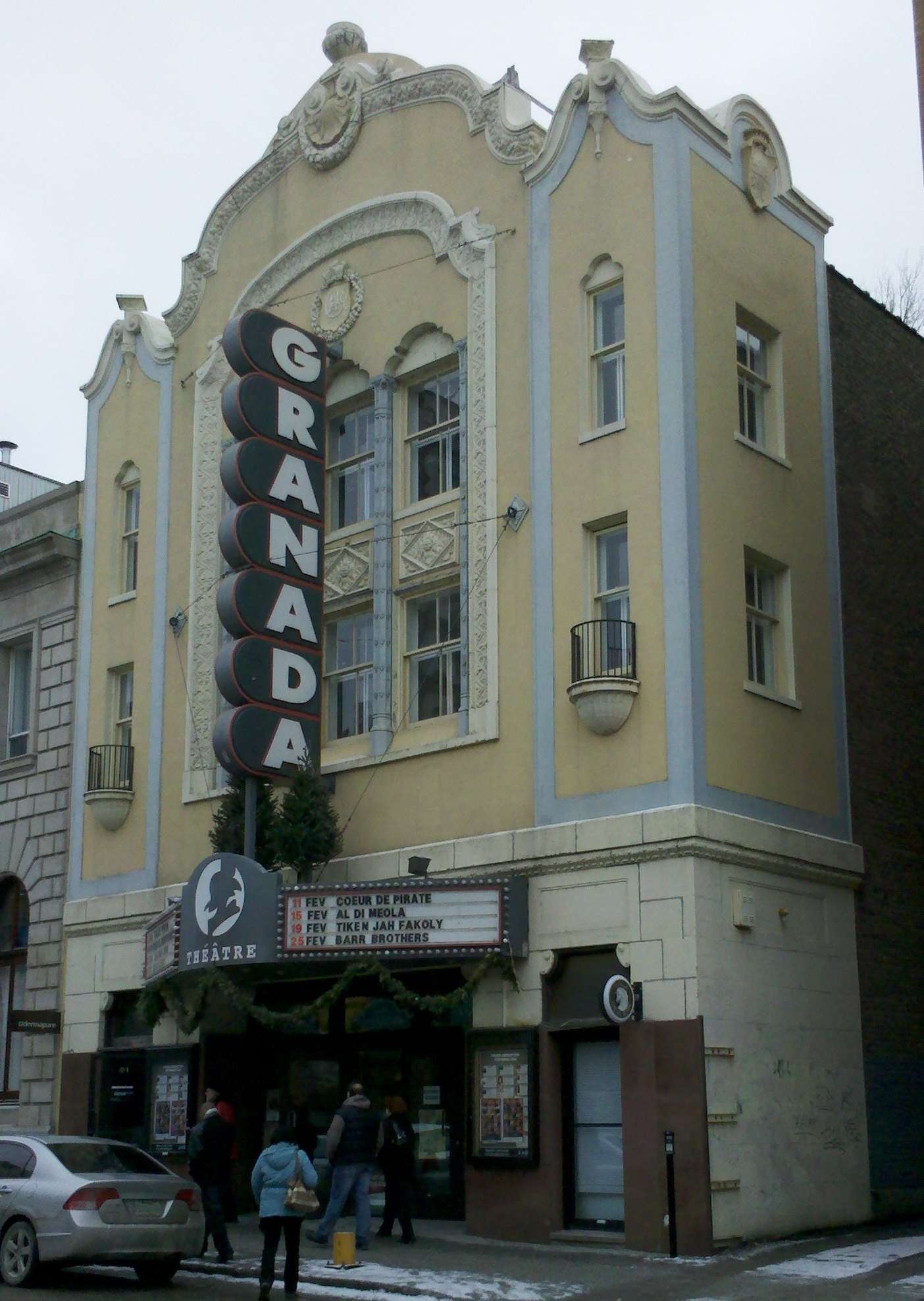
- Interactive map of Granada Theatre
- Address: 53, rue Wellington Nord; Sherbrooke, Quebec; J1H 5A9
- Coordinates: 45.402222°N 71.891111°W
- Owner: City of Sherbrooke
- Capacity: 1,200
- Type: Atmospheric theatre
- Designation: National Historic Site of Canada

Construction
- Opened: January 18, 1929
- Architect: Daniel J. Crighton

Website
- theatregranada.com

The Granada Theatre (French: Théâtre Granada) is a theatre in Sherbrooke, Quebec, Canada.

The Granada Theatre was listed as a National Historic Site of Canada on June 5, 1996.

The building was designed in the Spanish Revival style by Daniel J. Crighton with its interior decor by prolific theatre decorator Emmanuel Briffa.

== History ==
It was built as an atmospheric theatre in 1928 by United Amusement Corporation Limited, a subsidiary of Famous Players. It was inaugurated on January 18, 1929.

During the 1970s, the opening of movie theatres in shopping centers in suburban areas are made at the expense of the existing downtown movie theaters. Film showings became increasingly rare.

In 1998, the city of Sherbrooke bought the theater in order to protect the building.

== See also ==
- Vieux Clocher de Magog
