= Orford (electoral district) =

Provincial electoral district in Quebec, Canada

Coordinates: 45.20°N 72.16°W

Quebec electoral district

Provincial electoral district
- Legislature: National Assembly of Quebec
MNA
Charles Milliard
Liberal
- District created: 1972
- First contested: 1973
- Last contested: 2026

Demographics
- Population (2011): 50,395
- Electors (2012): 40,317
- Area (km²): 1,580.6
- Pop. density (per km²): 31.9
- Census division(s): Le Val-Saint-François (part), Memphrémagog (all)
- Census subdivision(s): Austin, Ayer's Cliff, Bolton-Est, Eastman, Hatley (township), Hatley (municipality), Magog, North Hatley, Ogden, Orford, Potton, Saint-Benoît-du-Lac, Sainte-Catherine-de-Hatley, Saint-Étienne-de-Bolton, Stanstead (township), Stanstead (city), Stukely-Sud

Orford is a provincial electoral district in the Estrie region of Quebec, Canada, that elects members to the National Assembly of Quebec. It notably includes the municipalities of Magog, Orford, Stanstead, and Sainte-Catherine-de-Hatley.

It was created for the 1973 election from parts of the Shefford, Sherbrooke and Stanstead electoral districts.

In the change from the 2001 to the 2011 electoral map, it lost the part of western Sherbrooke that it formerly had to the Richmond electoral district and the municipalities of Barnston-Ouest and Stanstead-Est to the Saint-François electoral district. However, it gained a number of municipalities from Brome-Missisquoi.

In 2026, it lost Sainte-Anne-de-la-Rochelle, Lawrenceville, and Bonsecours.

== Members of the National Assembly ==
Legislature	Years	Member	Party
Riding created from Shefford, Sherbrooke and Stanstead
30th	1973–1976	Georges Vaillancourt	Liberal
31st	1976–1981	Georges Vaillancourt	Liberal
32nd	1981–1985	Georges Vaillancourt	Liberal
33rd	1985–1989	Georges Vaillancourt	Liberal
34th	1989–1994	Robert Benoit	Liberal
35th	1994–1998	Robert Benoit	Liberal
36th	1998–2003	Robert Benoit	Liberal
37th	2003–2007	Pierre Reid	Liberal
38th	2007–2008	Pierre Reid	Liberal
39th	2008–2012	Pierre Reid	Liberal
40th	2012–2014	Pierre Reid	Liberal
41st	2014–2018	Pierre Reid	Liberal
42nd	2018–2022	Gilles Bélanger	Coalition Avenir Québec
43rd	2022–2026	Gilles Bélanger	Coalition Avenir Québec
43rd	2026–2026	Gilles Bélanger	Independent
44th	2026–Present	Charles Milliard	Liberal

== Election results ==
2026 Quebec general election
** Preliminary results — Not yet official **
Party	Candidate	Votes	%	±%
Liberal	Charles Milliard	13,080	37.80	
Parti Québécois	Jocelyn Caron	8,664	25.04	
Conservative	Benoit Robitaille	4,785	13.83	
Coalition Avenir Québec	Allison Turner	4,113	11.89	
Québec solidaire	Eve-Lyne Clusiault	3,349	9.68	
Parti nul	David Cherniak	168	0.49	
Présence	Lucie Pinard	158	0.46	
Canadian	Ngaire DeNora	147	0.42	
Climat Québec	Madeleine Smith	138	0.40	
Total valid votes				
Total rejected ballots				
Turnout			72.95	
Electors on the lists			–	–
Source: Élections Québec

2022 Quebec general election redistributed results
Party	Vote	%
Coalition Avenir Québec	13,338	42.80
Québec solidaire	5,050	16.21
Liberal	4,789	15.37
Parti Québécois	4,183	13.42
Conservative	3,369	10.81
Others	433	1.39

2022 Quebec general election
Party	Candidate	Votes	%	±%
Coalition Avenir Québec	Gilles Bélanger	14,084	42.95	+2.90
Québec solidaire	Kenza Sassi	5,298	16.16	-1.71
Liberal	Vicki-May Hamm	4,917	14.99	-9.96
Parti Québécois	Monique Allard	4,463	13.61	+1.23
Conservative	Martin Lamontagne Lacasse	3,567	10.88	+9.74
Canadian	Mark Gandey	354	1.08	–
Démocratie directe	Joel Lacroix	109	0.33	–
Total valid votes		32,792	99.04	–
Total rejected ballots		319	0.96	–
Turnout		33,111	71.19	
Electors on the lists		46,514	–	–

2018 Quebec general election
Party	Candidate	Votes	%	±%
Coalition Avenir Québec	Gilles Bélanger	12,117	40.05	+19.02
Liberal	Guy Madore	7,548	24.95	-19.14
Québec solidaire	Annabelle Lalumière-Ting	5,406	17.87	+10.13
Parti Québécois	Maxime Leclerc	3,744	12.38	-13.85
Green	Stéphanie Desmeules	881	2.91	
Conservative	Joseph Tremblay-Bonsens	344	1.14	
Citoyens au pouvoir	Tommy Poulin	211	0.7	
Total valid votes		30,251	98.63	
Total rejected ballots		420	1.37	
Turnout		30,671	70.72	
Eligible voters		43,367		
Coalition Avenir Québec gain from Liberal		Swing		+19.08
Source(s) "Rapport des résultats officiels du scrutin". Élections Québec.

2014 Quebec general election
Party	Candidate	Votes	%	±%
Liberal	Pierre Reid	13,055	44.09	+7.51
Parti Québécois	Michel Breton	7,767	26.23	-4.32
Coalition Avenir Québec	Marc-Alexandre Bourget	6,227	21.03	-3.12
Québec solidaire	Patricia Tremblay	2,291	7.74	+2.35
Option nationale	Denis Spick	273	0.92	-0.22
Total valid votes		29,613	98.71	–
Total rejected ballots		387	1.29	–
Turnout		30,000	72.82	-5.28
Electors on the lists		41,195	–	–

2012 Quebec general election
Party	Candidate	Votes	%	±%
Liberal	Pierre Reid	11,448	36.58	-9.96
Parti Québécois	Michel Breton	9,560	30.55	-3.13
Coalition Avenir Québec	Jean L'Écuyer	7,558	24.15	+11.12
Québec solidaire	Patricia Tremblay	1,687	5.39	+1.79
Green	Guillaume Corriveau	554	1.77	-1.30
Option nationale	Marie-Hélène Martin	356	1.14	–
Coalition pour la constituante	Serge Trottier	134	0.43	–
Total valid votes		31,297	99.08	–
Total rejected ballots		291	0.92	–
Turnout		31,588	78.10	
Electors on the lists		40,443	–	–
Liberal hold		Swing		-3.41

^ Change is from redistributed results. CAQ change is from ADQ.

2008 Quebec general election: Orford
Party	Candidate	Votes	%	±%
Liberal	Pierre Reid	14,709	43.40	+10.12
Parti Québécois	Michel Breton	12,516	36.93	+8.47
Action démocratique	Pierre Harvey	4,516	13.32	−16.77
Québec solidaire	Patricia Tremblay	1,128	3.33	−0.25
Green	Louis Hamel	1,026	3.03	−1.56
Total valid votes		33,895	100.00	
Rejected and declined votes		425		
Turnout		34,320	61.65	−12.43
Electors on the lists		55,668		
Source: Official Results, Le Directeur général des élections du Québec.

2007 Quebec general election: Orford
Party	Candidate	Votes	%	±%
Liberal	Pierre Reid	13,050	33.28	−16.20
Action démocratique	Steve Bourassa	11,798	30.09	+12.53
Parti Québécois	Michel Breton	11,158	28.46	−3.08
Green	Louis Hamel	1,798	4.59	+3.17
Québec solidaire	Patricia Tremblay	1,404	3.58	
Total valid votes		39,208	100.00	
Rejected and declined votes		344		
Turnout		39,552	74.08	+2.66
Electors on the lists		53,391		
Source: Official Results, Le Directeur général des élections du Québec.

2003 Quebec general election: Orford
Party	Candidate	Votes	%	±%
Liberal	Pierre Reid	17,314	49.48	
Parti Québécois	Yvon Bélair	11,037	31.54	
Action démocratique	Steve Bourassa	6,145	17.56	
UFP	Véronique Grenier	498	1.42	–
Total valid votes		34,994	100.00	
Rejected and declined votes		393		
Turnout		35,387	71.42	
Electors on the lists		49,547		
Source: Official Results, Le Directeur général des élections du Québec.

1998 Quebec general election: Orford
Party	Candidate	Votes	%	±%
Liberal	Robert Benoit	21,164	50.96	−0.11
Parti Québécois	Olivier Désilets	16,248	39.12	−1.81
Action démocratique	René Forget	3,624	8.73	+2.16
Socialist Democracy	Josué Côté	352	0.85	
Natural Law	Claire Desmeules	144	0.35	−0.43
Total valid votes		41,532	100.00	
Rejected and declined votes		396		
Turnout		41,928	81.32	−1.47
Electors on the lists		51,560		
Source: Official Results, Le Directeur général des élections du Québec.

1995 Quebec referendum
Side	Votes	%
Non	23,132	52.69
Oui	20,773	47.31

1994 Quebec general election: Orford
Party	Candidate	Votes	%	±%
Liberal	Robert Benoit	19,082	51.07	−6.41
Parti Québécois	Ginette Therrien	15,295	40.93	+8.91
Action démocratique	Michel Roy	2,454	6.57	
Natural Law	Jean-Paul Lapointe	293	0.78	
Parti économique	Carole Blouin	242	0.65	
Total valid votes		37,366	100.00	
Rejected and declined votes		554		
Turnout		37,920	82.79	+8.59
Electors on the lists		45,802		
Source: Official Results, Le Directeur général des élections du Québec.

1992 Charlottetown Accord referendum
Side	Votes	%
Non	19,164	53.66
Oui	16,552	46.34

1989 Quebec general election: Orford
Party	Candidate	Votes	%
Liberal	Robert Benoit	17,236	57.48
Parti Québécois	Henri Bourassa	9,601	32.02
Unity	Claude-M. Ostiguy	1,696	5.66
New Democratic	Denis Boissé	861	2.87
Parti 51	André Perron	594	1.98
Total valid votes		29,988	100.00
Rejected and declined votes		760	
Turnout		30,748	74.20
Electors on the lists		41,442	
Source: Official Results, Le Directeur général des élections du Québec.

1981 Quebec general election: Orford
Party	Candidate	Votes	%	±%
Liberal	Georges Vaillancourt	15,828	54.40	
Parti Québécois	Yvon Bélair	12,186	41.88	
Union Nationale	Jacques E. Tardif	1,083	3.72	–
Total valid votes		29,097	100.00	
Rejected and declined votes		226		
Turnout		29,323		
Electors on the lists		35,703		
Source: Official Results, Le Directeur général des élections du Québec.

1980 Quebec referendum
Side	Votes	%
Non	19,684	66.35
Oui	9,983	33.65

1976 Quebec general election
Party	Candidate	Votes	%
Liberal	Georges Vaillancourt	8,321	32.90
Parti Québécois	Laurent Bertrand	7,685	30.39
Union Nationale	Kevin J. Danaher	6,979	27.60
Ralliement créditiste	Alexandre Basque	2,077	8.21
Parti national populaire	René Lavallée	228	0.90
Total valid votes		25,290	98.13
Total rejected ballots		481	1.87
Turnout		25,771	81.40
Electors on the lists		31,659	–

1973 Quebec general election
Party	Candidate	Votes	%
Liberal	Georges Vaillancourt	13,924	63.09
Parti Québécois	Laurent Bertrand	3,797	17.20
Ralliement créditiste	Maurice Théroux	3,574	16.19
Union Nationale	Ghislain Pelletier	777	3.52
Total valid votes		22,072	98.82
Total rejected ballots		264	1.18
Turnout		22,336	81.23
Electors on the lists		27,497	–

== See also ==
- List of Quebec provincial electoral districts
- Canadian provincial electoral districts
