= Gilles Bélanger =

Canadian politician

Member of the National Assembly of Quebec for Orford
- In office October 1, 2018 – August 27, 2026
- Preceded by: Pierre Reid
- Succeeded by: Charles Milliard

Personal details
- Born: 23 January 1958 (age 68) Saint-Laurent, Quebec, Canada
- Party: Independent (since 2026); Coalition Avenir Québec (until 2026)

Gilles Bélanger is a Canadian politician, who was elected to the National Assembly of Quebec in the 2018 provincial election under the Coalition Avenir Québec. He represented the electoral district of Orford.

== Political career ==
On 28 February 2025, he was appointed cybersecurity and digital technology minister by Premier François Legault to replace Éric Caire.

In January 2026, Bélanger endorsed Christine Fréchette for the 2026 Coalition Avenir Québec leadership election. He announced that he was not running in the 2026 election and later left the CAQ caucus due to decisions made by the government such as the appointment of the economy, innovation and energy portfolio to Frechette's leadership rival, Bernard Drainville in April 2026.

== Electoral record ==
2022 Quebec general election: Orford
Party	Candidate	Votes	%	±%
Coalition Avenir Québec	Gilles Bélanger	14,084	42.95	+2.90
Québec solidaire	Kenza Sassi	5,298	16.16	-1.71
Liberal	Vicki-May Hamm	4,917	14.99	-9.96
Parti Québécois	Monique Allard	4,463	13.61	+1.23
Conservative	Martin Lamontagne Lacasse	3,567	10.88	+9.74
Canadian	Mark Gandey	354	1.08	–
Démocratie directe	Joel Lacroix	109	0.33	–
Total valid votes		32,792	99.04	–
Total rejected ballots		319	0.96	–
Turnout		33,111	71.19	
Electors on the lists		46,514	–	–

2018 Quebec general election: Orford
Party	Candidate	Votes	%	±%
Coalition Avenir Québec	Gilles Bélanger	12,117	40.05	+19.02
Liberal	Guy Madore	7,548	24.95	-19.14
Québec solidaire	Annabelle Lalumière-Ting	5,406	17.87	+10.13
Parti Québécois	Maxime Leclerc	3,744	12.38	-13.85
Green	Stéphanie Desmeules	881	2.91	
Conservative	Joseph Tremblay-Bonsens	344	1.14	
Citoyens au pouvoir	Tommy Poulin	211	0.7	
Total valid votes		30,251	98.63	
Total rejected ballots		420	1.37	
Turnout		30,671	70.72	
Eligible voters		43,367		
Coalition Avenir Québec gain from Liberal		Swing		+19.08
Source(s) "Rapport des résultats officiels du scrutin". Élections Québec.
