= Glastonbury Thorn =

Tree associated with Joseph of Arimathea at Glastonbury

Coordinates: 51.148°N 2.716°W

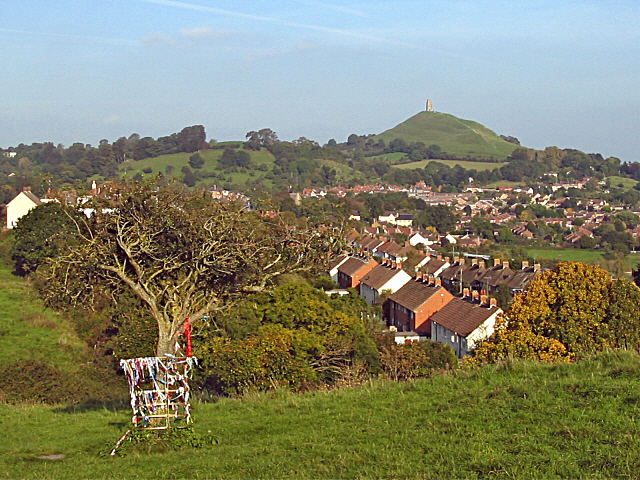
The thorn on Wearyall Hill, before its branches were cut off by vandals in 2010. Glastonbury Tor is in the background.

The Glastonbury thorn is a form of common hawthorn, Crataegus monogyna 'Biflora' (sometimes incorrectly called Crataegus oxyacantha var. praecox), found in and around Glastonbury, Somerset, England. Unlike ordinary hawthorn trees, it flowers twice a year (hence the name "biflora"), the first time in winter and the second time in spring. The trees in the Glastonbury area have been propagated by grafting since ancient times. The tree is also widely called the holy thorn, though this term strictly speaking refers to the original (legendary) tree.

It is associated with legends about Joseph of Arimathea and the arrival of Christianity in Britain, and has appeared in written texts since the medieval period. A flowering sprig is sent to the British Monarch every Christmas. The original tree has been propagated several times, with one tree growing at Glastonbury Abbey and another in the churchyard of the Church of St John. The "original" Glastonbury thorn was cut down and burned as a relic of superstition during the English Civil War, and one planted on Wearyall Hill in 1951 to replace it had its branches cut off in 2010.

== History ==
According to legend, Joseph of Arimathea visited Glastonbury with the Holy Grail and thrust his staff into Wearyall Hill, which then grew into the original thorn tree. Early writers do not connect Joseph to the arrival of Christianity in Britain, and the first literary source to place him in Britain appeared in the thirteenth century. The historicity of Joseph's presence in Glastonbury remains controversial, but the thorn is first mentioned in a pamphlet published by Richard Pynson in 1520 called Lyfe of Joseph of Armathie, which was almost certainly commissioned by Glastonbury Abbey. In this account, the miraculous winter-flowering Thorn is paired with an equally remarkable walnut tree that grew in the Abbey grounds and was said to flower on Midsummer's Day. Both were seen as marks of divine favour, proof that Glastonbury was 'the holyest erth of Englande'.

The Thorn kept Glastonbury's legendary history alive during the centuries between the dissolution and the town's renaissance as a spiritual centre in the twentieth century. The abbey was dissolved in 1539 and substantially demolished during the reign of Elizabeth I, but the Thorn continued to flower at Christmas and many Catholics saw this as "a Testimony to Religion, that it might flourish in persecution".

The Thorn's symbolic fortunes revived when the Stuart dynasty came to power in 1603. James I and Charles I took a much more relaxed view of Catholicism than Queen Elizabeth had done, and both were intrigued by its Christmas-flowering properties. James Montague, Bishop of Bath and Wells from 1608 to 1616, produced a 'Panegiricall entertainement' for Anne of Denmark, King James I's consort, in which the character of Joseph of Arimathea presented the Queen with boughs from both the Thorn and the Walnut, in memory of 'ruinated Glastonbury'. Royal interest in the Thorn, however, made it a very suspect symbol to the growing number of Puritans who saw Christmas as a Catholic survival, and some feared that the Stuarts were intending to restore the Catholic faith. The Puritan cause was strong in Somerset, and when civil war broke out the royal reaction was particularly severe. The Thorn was chopped down by a zealous Parliamentary soldier, probably in 1647.

Although destroyed, the Thorn retained some symbolic resonance for the royalist underground during the years of the Commonwealth, both in England and in the exiled Stuart court. It features in Wenceslaus Hollar's celebrated engraving of Glastonbury, commissioned for Sir William Dugdale's controversial survey of England's ruined monasteries, Monasticon Anglicanum, published in 1655. The restoration of Charles II in 1660 was marked with a lot of spring-like floral imagery, and it may be no coincidence that the most famous of the Thorn legends is first recorded in 1662. According to this, Joseph of Arimathea arrived on Wearyall Hill with his followers on Christmas Day; 'we are weary all', he announced, and planted his staff in the ground, which thereupon burst into flower. This story draws on a fairly common biblical theme in which saintly staves miraculously burst into flower as a sign of divine favour.

This legend, like that of Joseph's arrival itself, fell foul both of regime change (the Stuart dynasty was replaced in 1689) and by the new scholarship of the Age of Reason. Both Joseph and the Thorn were relegated to the status of popular folklore, where, however, they flourished. An anonymous chapbook called The History of that Holy Disciple Joseph of Arimathea went through at least 34 editions during the eighteenth century, and although the texts often differ the chapbook always ends with a description of the Thorn, "a most miraculous Curiosity", which attracted "Thousands of People, of different Opinions" to Glastonbury every year.

At the time of the adoption of the revised Gregorian calendar in Britain in 1752, the Gentleman's Magazine reported that curious visitors went to see whether the Glastonbury thorn kept to the Julian calendar or the new one:

Glastonbury.—A vast concourse of people attended the noted thorn on Christmas-day, new style; but, to their great disappointment, there was no appearance of its blowing, which made them watch it narrowly the 5th of January, the Christmas-day, old style, when it blowed as usual.

Gentleman's Magazine January 1753

Interest in the Thorn amongst 'respectable' society revived during the Victorian era. Renewed interest in Christmas, coupled with a greater sense of moral responsibility, part of the romantic backlash against the perceived soul-lessness of industrialism and urbanisation. New legends began to appear at the end of the nineteenth century, amid new curiosity and speculation about the inhabitants and customs of prehistoric Britain. Some suggested that the Thorn may have been the 'Sacred Tree' of the British Isles in pre-Christian times, and in the twentieth century its legends helped to anchor the mythologies of the New Age.

=== Royal tradition ===
Every Christmas, the Vicar and the Mayor of Glastonbury sent a budded branch of the Glastonbury thorn to The King. Christmas cuttings are known to have been sent to both Charles I and Charles II, but the modern tradition dates from 1929, when the Vicar of Glastonbury, Lionel Smithett Lewis, sent one to Queen Mary and King George V. The event has become a major feature in the town calendar. The thorn also featured on British postage stamps on the 12p and 13p Christmas stamps in 1986.

=== 2010 deliberate damage ===
The Glastonbury thorn was once again attacked and its branches cut off, in this case the 1951 specimen that was growing on Wearyall Hill on the southwestern side of the town, on 9 December 2010. In March 2011, it was reported that a new shoot had appeared on the damaged tree. However, as these new shoots came up they would suspiciously disappear a few days or weeks later.

=== 2012 replanting and further damage ===
On 1 April 2012 a sapling grafted from a descendant of the pre-1951 specimen was planted by the landowners working with Glastonbury Conservation Society and consecrated, but it was snapped in half and irreparably damaged 16 days later.

=== 2019 removal ===
In May 2019 the tree was entirely removed by the land owner.

== Propagation ==
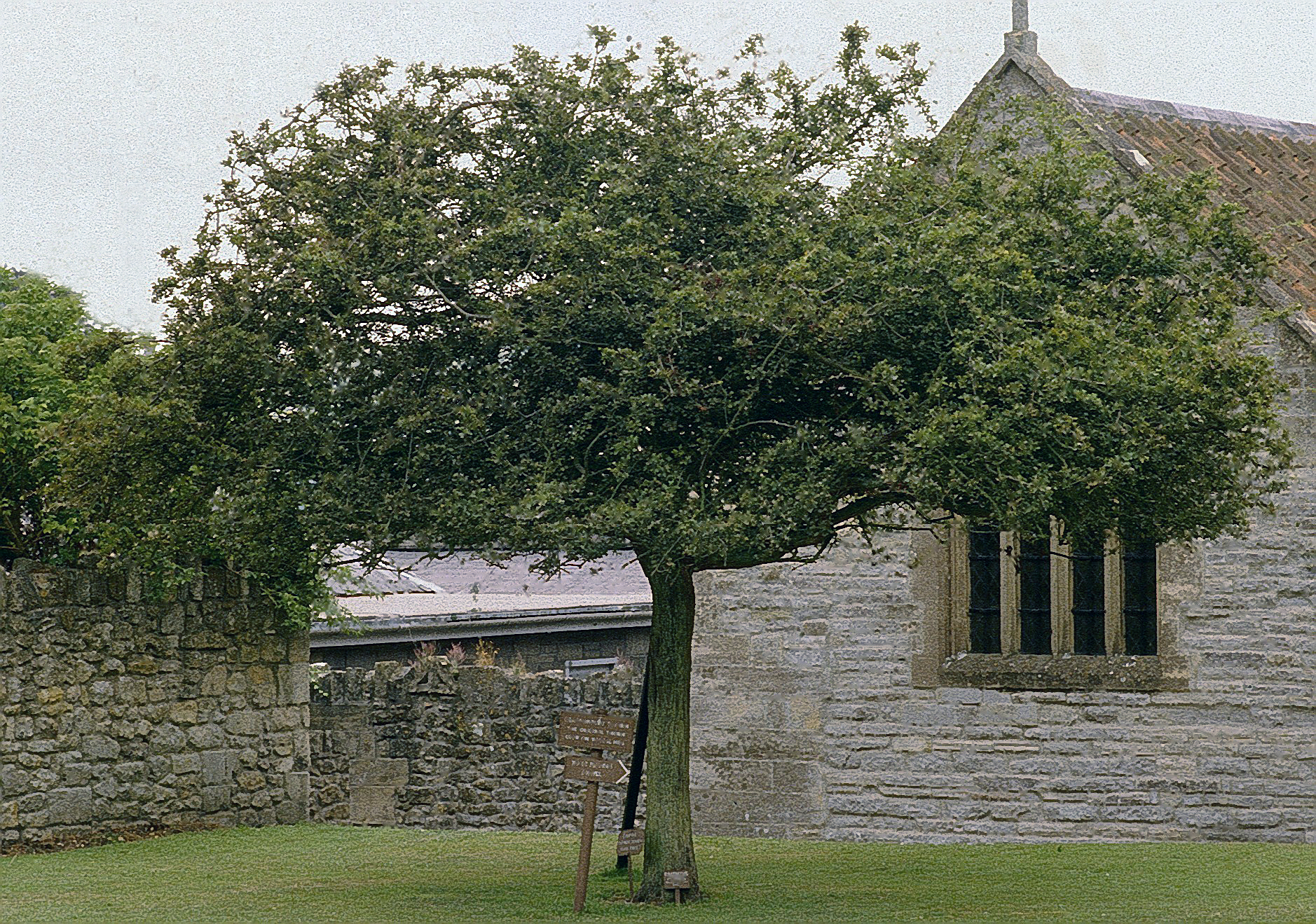
Glastonbury Thorn at Glastonbury Abbey, 1984. This tree died in 1991 and was removed in 1992.

Many have tried to grow the Glastonbury thorn from seed and direct cuttings, but in the later part of the 20th century all attempts reverted to the normal hawthorn type, flowering only in spring.

This tree has been widely propagated by grafting or cuttings, with the cultivar name 'Biflora' or 'Praecox'. An early antiquarian account by Mr Eyston was given in Hearne's History and Antiquities of Glastonbury, 1722 : "There is a person about Glastonbury who has a nursery of them, who, Mr. Paschal tells us he is informed, sells them for a crown a piece, or as he can get."

The tree in the grounds of the church was pronounced dead in June 1991, and cut down the following February. However, many cuttings were taken from it before its destruction. The pre-1991 thorn in the grounds of Glastonbury Church is said to be a cutting from the original plant which was planted in secret after the original was destroyed. Now only trees budded or grafted from the original exist, and these blossom twice a year, in May and at Christmas. The blossoms of the Christmas shoots are usually much smaller than the May ones and do not produce any haws. Plants grown from the haws do not retain the characteristics of the parent stem.

The present "sacred thorn tree" at the Church of St John was grown from a local cutting, like many others in the neighbourhood of Glastonbury. The large tree had been in the churchyard for eighty years. It was planted by Mr George Chislett, then head gardener of Glastonbury Abbey. He also learned how to graft holy thorn cuttings onto the root of blackthorn stock, and so preserve the "miraculous" Christmas blossoming characteristic. His son, Wilf, sent Glastonbury thorn cuttings all over the world, including to Washington, Canada, New Zealand and Australia.

Trees survive from earlier grafts to perpetuate the Glastonbury legend, among them two other holy thorns in the grounds of St John's. The blossom sent to the King now comes from one of these. At the end of term, the pupils of St John's Infants School gather round the tree in St John's parish churchyard on the High Street. They sing carols, including one specially written for the occasion, and the oldest pupil has the privilege of cutting the branch of the Glastonbury thorn that is then taken to London and presented to His Majesty The King. In 1965, the Queen erected a wooden cross at Glastonbury with the following inscription: "The cross, the symbol of our faith, the gift of Queen Elizabeth II, marks a Christian sanctuary so ancient that only legend can record its origin."

== See also ==
- The Oaks of Avalon, a pair of nearby ancient oak trees with druidic connections
