= Parti Québécois candidates in the 2008 Quebec provincial election =

The Parti Québécois (PQ) fielded a full slate of 125 candidates in the 2008 Quebec provincial election and elected fifty-one members to emerge as the Official Opposition party in the national assembly.

== Candidates (incomplete) ==
Riding	Candidate's Name	Notes	Gender	Occupation	Votes	%	Rank
Argenteuil	John Saywell	Saywell is the son of Canadian historian John Saywell. He also ran as a PQ candidate in Argenteuil in 2007. He was elected mayor of Grenville-sur-la-Rouge in a December 2010 by-election, resigned in 2012, and was re-elected mayor in 2013.	M	Lawyer and urban planner	7,353	33.62	2nd
Bourassa-Sauvé	Roland Carrier	Carrier also ran for the PQ in Bourassa-Sauvé in 2007 and sought election to the Montreal city council in 1998 (as a Montreal Citizens' Movement candidate) and in 2005 and 2009 (for Vision Montreal).	M	Lawyer	6,111	26.87	2nd
Brome—Missisquoi	Richard Leclerc	A veteran member of the Quebec sovereigntist movement, Leclerc also ran for the PQ in Brome—Missisquoi in 2007 and 2012.	M	Publicist	8,325	27.32	2nd
Jean-Lesage	Hélène Guillemette	Guillemette was a political attaché to Parti Québécois MNA François Gendron from 2003 to 2005. She sought the PQ nomination for Jean-Lesage in 2007, but lost to Christian Simard. She is married to former Bloc Québécois Member of Parliament (MP) Pascal-Pierre Paillé.	F	Development agent	7,471	26.68	2nd
Orford	Michel Breton	Breton was a constituency assistant to Bloc Québécois Member of Parliament (MP) Christian Ouellet from 2006 to 2011. He was also the PQ candidate for Orford in 2007, 2012, and 2014.	M	Parliamentary assistant	12,516	36.93	2nd
Verdun	Richard Langlais	Langlais was also the PQ candidate for Verdun in 2007 and in a December 2016 by-election. He ran for borough mayor of Verdun as a Vision Montreal candidate in 2009 and for Montreal city council in 2013 as an Option Verdun/Montréal candidate.	M	Entrepreneur	8,314	35.34	2nd
