= 2009 Gatineau municipal election =

- Mayoral election
- November 1, 2009
- Registered: 180,777
- Turnout: 39.41% (▼8.49pp)
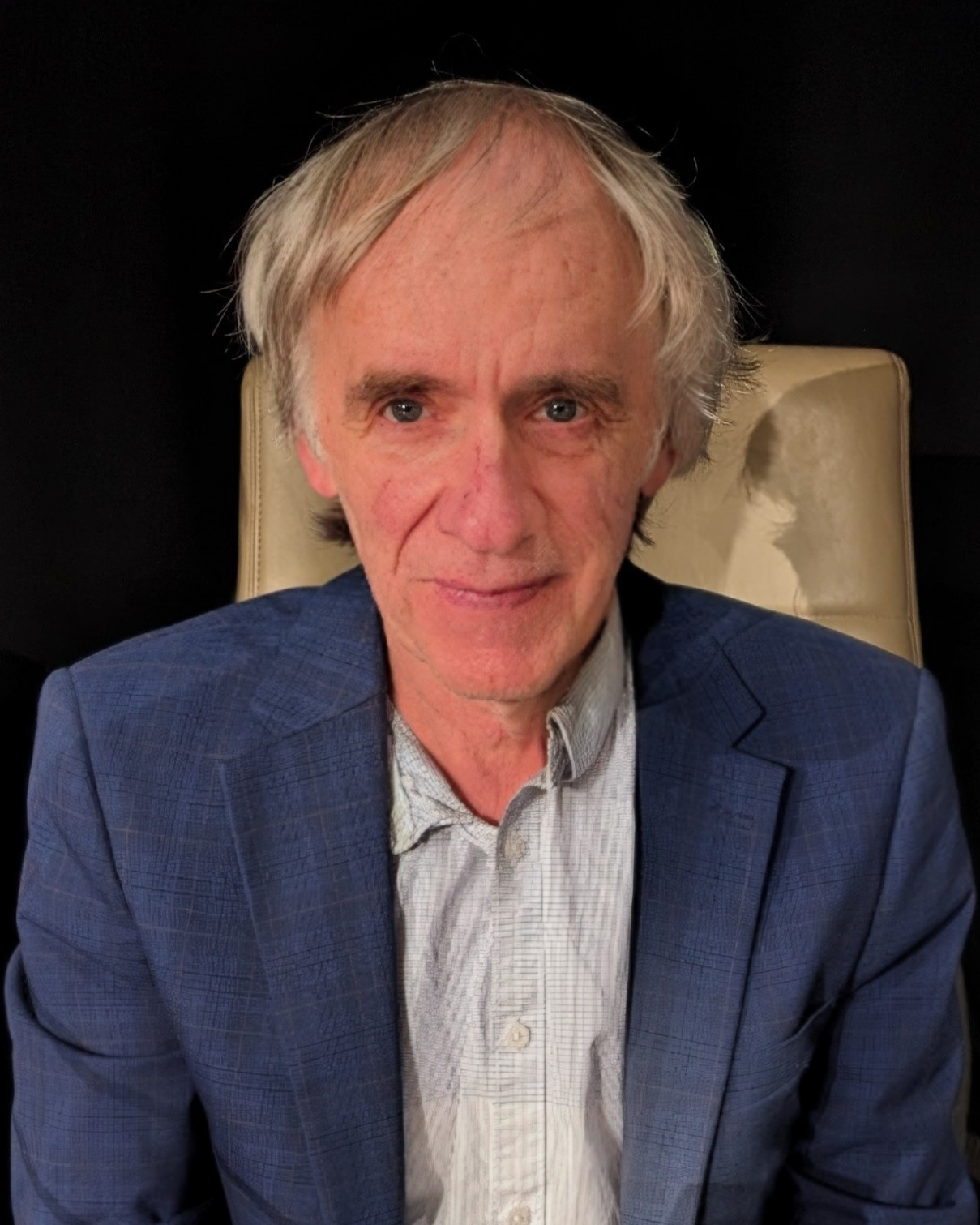
		AD
Nominee	Marc Bureau	Aurèle Desjardins
Party	Independent	Independent
Popular vote	30,929	18,551
Percentage	44.11%	26.46%
Mayor before election
Marc Bureau
Independent
Elected mayor
Marc Bureau
Independent
- City Council election
- November 1, 2009
- 17 seats on Gatineau City Council (Note: The Mayor is a member of City Council, but for the purposes of documentation is treated as their own individual.); 9 seats needed for a majority
Party	Leader	Vote %	Seats	+/–
Independent	–	100.00	17	0
This lists parties that won seats. See the complete results below.

A municipal election was held in Gatineau, Quebec, Canada on November 1, 2009, in conjunction with municipal elections across Quebec on that date. Elections were held for Mayor of Gatineau as well as for each of the 18 districts on Gatineau City Council.

== Controversies ==
Signs in the Gatineau area-sponsoring Lucerne District Councillor candidate Barbara Charlebois posters were removed and vandalized due to her election poster being primarily in English. A similar act of vandalism was perpetrated on the offices of the Regional Association of West Quebecers, a not-for profit organization that support English-Speakers in the community, of which Charlebois is vice-president. Jean-Roch Villemaire, a former provincial candidate for the extreme-separatist Parti indépendantiste, took responsibility for both situations.

== Mayoral race ==
At 8:59 pm, CBC reported that Marc Bureau, the incumbent mayor of Gatineau had won the Gatineau mayoral race.

2009 Gatineau municipal election: Mayor
Candidate	Votes	%
(x)Marc Bureau	30,929	44.11
Aurèle Desjardins	18,551	26.46
Tony Cannavino	17,119	24.42
Luc Desjardins	1,266	1.81
Roger Fleury	1,198	1.71
Richard Gravel	1,052	1.50
Total valid votes	70,115	100

== Aylmer District ==
Candidate	Vote	%
Stefan Psenak	1,790	50.0
Frank Thérien (X)	1,789	50.0

== Lucerne District ==
Candidate	Vote	%
André Laframboise (X)	2,188	53.5
Roch Givogue	1,313	32.1
Barbara Charlebois	587	14.4

== Deschênes District ==
Candidate	Vote	%
Alain Riel (X)	3,152	81.6
Peter L. Després	711	18.4

== Plateau–Manoir-des-Trembles District ==
Candidate	Vote	%
Maxime Tremblay	2,076	48.7
Nycole Turmel	1,980	46.5
Jean-Nicholas Martineau	205	4.8

== Wright-Parc-de-la-Montagne District ==
Candidate	Vote	%
Patrice Martin (X)	2,286	55.0
Jocelyn Blondin	1,871	45.0

== l'Orée-du-Parc District ==
Candidate	Vote	%
Mireille Apollon	2,750	65.1
Claude Millette (X)	1,474	34.9

== Saint-Raymond-Vanier District ==
Candidate	Vote	%
Pierre Philion (X)	1,884	64.8
Jean Bosco Citegetse	1,023	35.2

== Hull–Val-Tétreau District ==
Candidate	Vote	%
Denise Laferrière (X)	1,651	52.2
Pierre Ducasse	1,254	39.6
Mintri Nguyen	260	8.2

== Limbour District ==
2009 Gatineau municipal election: Councillor, Ward Nine (Limbour)
Candidate	Votes	%
Nicole Champagne	1,497	28.76
Stéphane Gauthier	1,411	27.10
Jocelyn Dumais	1,403	26.95
Michel Ghantous	895	17.19
Total valid votes	5,206	100

== Touraine District ==
Candidate	Vote	%
Denis Tassé (X)	2,382	65.2
Thérèse Cyr	1,269	34.8

== Promenades District ==
Candidate	Vote	%
Luc Angers (X)	Acclaimed	

== Carrefour-de-l'Hôpital District ==
Candidate	Vote	%
Patsy Bouthillette	Acclaimed	

== Versant District ==
Candidate	Vote	%
Joseph De Sylva (X)	3,267	72.3
Frédérick Castonguay	1,250	27.7

== Bellevue District ==
2009 Gatineau municipal election: Councillor, District 14 (Bellevue)
Candidate	Votes	%
Sylvie Goneau	1,809	44.90
Mark Bordeleau	1,796	44.58
Serge Charette	424	10.52
Total valid votes	4,029	100

- Sylvie Goneau was narrowly elected to city council in 2009. She had previously served as an assistant to Ottawa councillor Georges Bédard and worked as regional director of the Ambulance St-Jean. After the election, she was appointed as chair of the Commission permanente sur l'habitation.

== Lac-Beauchamp District ==
Candidate	Vote	%
Stéphane Lauzon	1,580	42.2
Jacques Robert	1,548	41.3
Michel Choquette	618	16.5

== la Rivière-Blanche District ==
Candidate	Vote	%
Yvon Boucher (X)	3,396	76.4
Normand Dessureault	1,047	23.6

== Masson-Angers District ==
Candidate	Vote	%
Luc Montreuil (X)	1,888	56.9
Serge Lefebvre	1,433	43.1

== Buckingham District ==
Candidate	Vote	%
Maxime Pedneaud-Jobin	2,188	54.5
Luc St-Jacques	862	21.5
Lévis Brazeau	612	15.2
Carl G. Simpson	356	8.9
