= Oaks of Avalon =

Pair of ancient oak trees

Coordinates: 51.1508°N 2.6857°W

The Oaks of Avalon is the collective name given to a pair of ancient oak trees, Gog and Magog, that stand in Glastonbury in Somerset, South West England. The trees were named after the ancient apocalyptic figures Gog and Magog.

The trees are believed to have been originally part of a ceremonial avenue towards Glastonbury Tor. The avenue was cut down in 1906 to make way for a farm, with the timber being sold to J. Snow & Son, a local timber merchant. At the time of the 1906 felling of the avenue one of the oak trees was measured at 11ft in diameter and had more than 2000 season growth rings. A historically based belief has Joseph of Arimathea following the row of trees towards the tor upon his arrival in Albion.

In April 2017, though already dead, Gog was badly damaged by fire from a candle. The fire is believed to have been accidental, and was put out by Devon and Somerset Fire and Rescue Service.
