= Magog Township, Quebec =

Former township in Canada

Coordinates: 45°10′N 72°15′W

Magog Township is a former township in the Canadian province of Quebec. It was amalgamated into the city of Magog in 2002.
