= Magog, Quebec =

City in Canada

Magog
- City
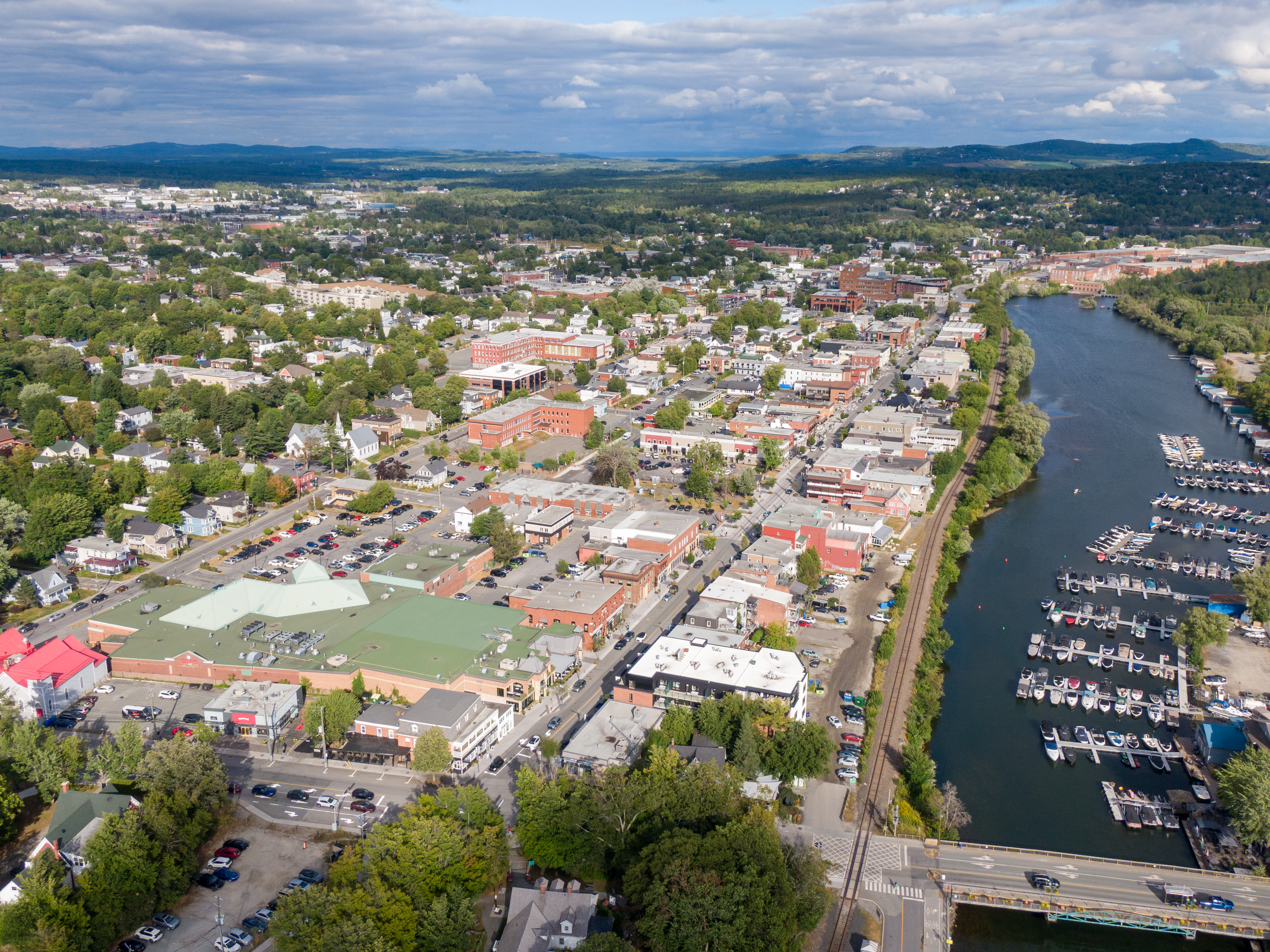
- Magog in 2025

- Logo
- Motto(s): Fidelitate et Labore(Latin) "Through faithfulness and labour"
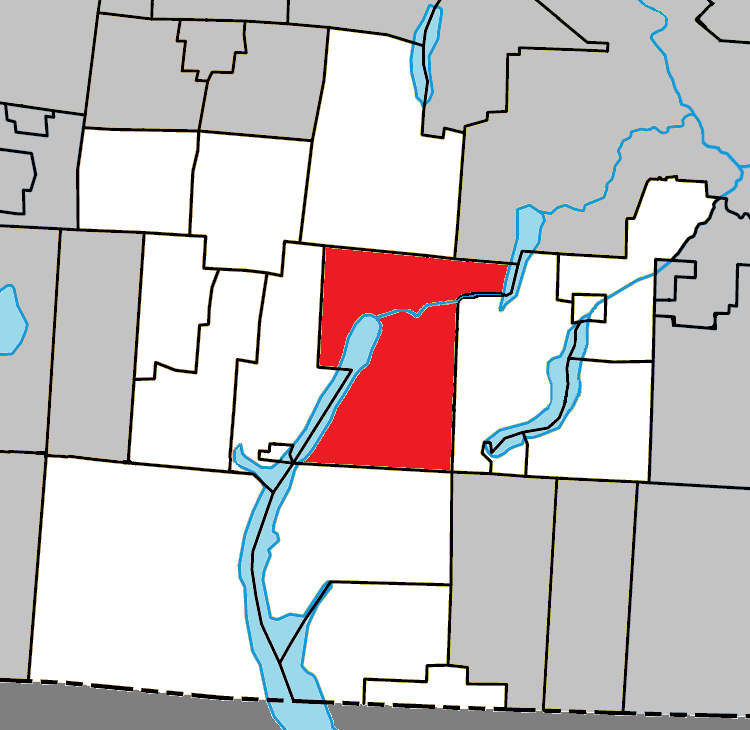
- Location within Memphrémagog RCM

- Location in southern Quebec
- Coordinates: 45°16′N 72°09′W
- Country: Canada
- Province: Quebec
- Region: Estrie
- RCM: Memphrémagog
- Constituted: October 9, 2002

Government
  - Mayor: Nathalie Pelletier
  - Federal riding: Brome—Missisquoi
  - Prov. riding: Orford

Area
  - City: 167.50 km^{2} (64.67 sq mi)
  - Land: 144.26 km^{2} (55.70 sq mi)
  - Urban: 19.57 km^{2} (7.56 sq mi)

Population (2021)
  - City: 28,312
  - Density: 196.3/km^{2} (508/sq mi)
  - Urban: 22,222
  - Pop 2016–2021: ▲6.2%
  - Dwellings: 15,009
- Time zone: UTC−5 (EST)
  - Summer (DST): UTC−4 (EDT)
- Postal code(s): J1X
- Area codes: 819 and 873
- Highways A-10 A-55: R-108; R-112; R-141; R-247
- Website: ville.magog.qc.ca

Magog (locally /ˈmeɪɡɔːɡ/ MAY-gawg; French: [maɡɔɡ]) is a city in southeastern Quebec, Canada, about 120 kilometres (75 mi) east of Montreal at the confluence of Lake Memphremagog—after which the city was named—with the Rivière aux Cerises and the Magog River. It is a major centre and industrial city in the Regional County Municipality of Memphremagog. The city lies in the Eastern Townships tourist region.

In 2002, the City of Magog was merged with the Township of Magog and the Village of Omerville as part of the municipal reorganization in Quebec.

== Etymology ==
"Memphremagog" comes from the Abenaki word mamhlawbagak, which means "at the large expanse of water" or "at the vast lake". "Magog" is believed to be a truncation of the lake's name. However, it could also come from namagok or namagwôttik, which mean "the lake where there is brook trout". Others have theorised that the name has Biblical origins in Gog and Magog, or that it refers to an ancient city by the same name.

== History ==
The Abenaki were the first to inhabit the region and had long visited the Memphremagog and its waterways. White settlement began in 1776, when Loyalists emigrated from nearby Vermont. They called it The Outlet, referring to the flow of water emptying into the Magog River from the lake.

Ralph Merry, who is considered the founding father of Magog, was an American Revolutionary who immigrated to Lower Canada in 1799 and settled in Bolton, to the west of the lake. He bought up all the neighbouring lots, including The Outlet village, where he went on to act as its mayor, judge, and developer. In 1821, he built a house there, which is the oldest standing house in the city.

It was formally named Magog in 1855.

At the end of the 19th century and throughout the 20th, the city's economy was dominated by the textile industry, most notably by a cotton mill operated by Dominion Textile. It was only in the 1960s and the 1970s that the city's economy would achieve desperately needed diversification through tourism, services, and the development of an industrial park.

In 2002, the City of Magog was merged with the Township of Magog and the Village of Omerville as part of the municipal reorganization in Quebec.

== Notable people ==
- Rouville Beaudry, Quebec nationalism activist who served in the Legislative Assembly of Quebec
- Pierre Bélanger, volleyball player who competed in the 1976 Olympics
- Nicolas Boulay, Canadian Football League player
- Reginald W. Buzzell, U.S. Army brigadier general, born in Magog
- Sonia Vachon, actress

== Geography ==
Magog is a city in southeastern Quebec, Canada, about 120 kilometres (75 mi) east of Montreal at the confluence of Lake Memphremagog, the Rivière aux Cerises, and the Magog River. The city of Magog is also in close proximity, 35 km (21.8 mi), to the Derby Line–Stanstead border crossing station at the Canada-United States border.

=== Climate ===
Climate data for Magog
Month	Jan	Feb	Mar	Apr	May	Jun	Jul	Aug	Sep	Oct	Nov	Dec	Year
Record high °C (°F)	17 (63)	15 (59)	24 (75)	29 (84)	33.9 (93.0)	33 (91)	34.4 (93.9)	33.3 (91.9)	30.6 (87.1)	27.2 (81.0)	22.8 (73.0)	18 (64)	34.4 (93.9)
Mean daily maximum °C (°F)	−5.9 (21.4)	−4 (25)	1.7 (35.1)	9.3 (48.7)	17.5 (63.5)	22.1 (71.8)	24.5 (76.1)	23.2 (73.8)	18 (64)	11.4 (52.5)	3.9 (39.0)	−2.7 (27.1)	9.9 (49.8)
Daily mean °C (°F)	−10.4 (13.3)	−8.8 (16.2)	−2.8 (27.0)	4.6 (40.3)	12 (54)	16.9 (62.4)	19.4 (66.9)	18.2 (64.8)	13.3 (55.9)	7.1 (44.8)	0.5 (32.9)	−6.7 (19.9)	5.3 (41.5)
Mean daily minimum °C (°F)	−14.9 (5.2)	−13.5 (7.7)	−7.3 (18.9)	−0.1 (31.8)	6.4 (43.5)	11.7 (53.1)	14.3 (57.7)	13.2 (55.8)	8.6 (47.5)	2.9 (37.2)	−2.9 (26.8)	−10.7 (12.7)	0.6 (33.1)
Record low °C (°F)	−37.2 (−35.0)	−38 (−36)	−31.7 (−25.1)	−17.2 (1.0)	−6.1 (21.0)	−2 (28)	2 (36)	0.6 (33.1)	−5 (23)	−8.9 (16.0)	−20.6 (−5.1)	−32.2 (−26.0)	−38 (−36)
Average precipitation mm (inches)	86.5 (3.41)	62 (2.4)	80.2 (3.16)	81.7 (3.22)	100.3 (3.95)	110.4 (4.35)	120.2 (4.73)	120 (4.7)	97.8 (3.85)	95.6 (3.76)	92.3 (3.63)	87.6 (3.45)	1,134.5 (44.67)
Source: Environment Canada

== Demographics ==
In the 2021 Census of Population conducted by Statistics Canada, Magog had a population of 28,312 living in 13,439 of its 15,009 total private dwellings, an increase of 6.2% from its 2016 population of 26,669. With a land area of 144.26 km^{2} (55.70 sq mi), it had a population density of 196.3/km^{2} (508.3/sq mi) in 2021.

Population trend:

Census	Population	Change (%)
2021	28,312	▲6.2%
2016	26,669	▲5.2%
2011	25,358	▲6.2%
2006	23,880	▲6.0%
Merger	22,535 (+)	▲58.00%
2001	14,283	▲1.7%
1996	14,050	▲0.1%
1991	14,034	N/A

(+) Merged with the Township of Magog and the Village of Omerville on October 9, 2002.

Mother tongue (2011)

Language	Population	Pct (%)
French only	22,975	92.2%
English only	1,390	5.6%
Both English and French	255	1.0%
Non-official languages	270	1.1%
French and non-official language	20	0.08%
English and non-official language	5	0.02%
English, French and non-official language	5	0.02%

== Economy ==
The city is the economic core of the Regional County Municipality of Memphremagog.

=== Industry ===
For several generations, it was a one-industry (textile) manufacturing town, where Dominion Textile made cotton goods. The main plant is still there. However, the plant has considerably reduced its activities to a few employees, who mainly make pillows.

=== Tourism ===
Magog is in a resort area, with shops and services catering to vacationers and tourists. Tourism is related to the lake and the nearby Mount Orford.

== See also ==
- List of cities in Quebec
- 2002 Magog municipal election
- Vieux Clocher de Magog
