= Salmon (disambiguation) =

Salmon is any of several species of fish of the family Salmonidae.

Salmon may also refer to:

- Salmon as food

== Fish ==
- Australian salmon (Arripis trutta)
- Blackhead salmon (Narcetes stomias)
- Indian salmon (Eleutheronema tetradactylum)
- Beaked salmon (Gonorynchus)
- King threadfin (Polydactylus macrochir), also known as king salmon, threadfin salmon or just salmon

== Places in the United States and Canada ==
- Salmon, Idaho, United States, a city
- Salmon Bay, a body of water in Seattle, Washington, United States
- Salmon Site, a nuclear test site in Mississippi, United States
- Salmon River (disambiguation), various rivers in the United States and Canada
- Salmon Creek (disambiguation), various creeks in the United States
- Salmon Brook (Merrimack River tributary), Massachusetts, United States
- Salmon Branch, Tennessee, United States, a stream
- Salmon Glacier, British Columbia, Canada
- Salmon Inlet, British Columbia

== Personal name ==
- Salmon (given name), a list of people and a biblical figure
- Salmon (surname), including a list of people with the name

== Vessels ==
- HMS Salmon, two ships of the British Royal Navy
- Salmon-class submarine, a class of submarines of the United States Navy
- USS Salmon, three submarines of the United States Navy

== Other uses ==
- Salmon (color), a pale pink-orange color
- Salmon (company), a financial technology company
- Salmon (protocol), a computing protocol
- Salmon Air, a commuter airline based in Idaho, United States
- Salmon High School, Salmon, Idaho
- Salmon Tandem Monoplane, a British light aeroplane

== See also ==
- Salmon House (disambiguation)
- Salmonfly, a family of giant stoneflies
- Salmon fly, artificial flies tied to catch Atlantic Salmon
- Salmon fly patterns, artificial flies tied to imitation giant stoneflies
- Salmond (disambiguation)
- Salman (disambiguation)
- Salmone (disambiguation)
- Sammon (disambiguation)
