= Rivière au Saumon =

Rivière au Saumon may refer to:

- Rivière au Saumon (Baie James), a tributary of the northeast shore of James Bay in the administrative region of Nord-du-Québec, Quebec, Canada.
- Rivière au Saumon (Saint-Jean River tributary), a tributary of Saint-Jean River in Lac-Jérôme, Quebec, Canada
- Rivière au Saumon (Le Haut-Saint-François), a tributary of Saint-François River in Weedon, Quebec, Canada
- Rivière au Saumon (Le Val-Saint-François), a tributary of Saint-François River in Melbourne, Quebec, Canada

== See also ==
- Port au Saumon River, a tributary of the northwest shore of the St. Lawrence River in the Capitale-Nationale administrative region, Quebec, Canada
- Rivière à Saumon, a tributary of Wapustagamau Lake in the administrative region of Côte-Nord, Quebec, Canada.
- Saumon River (Papineau), a tributary of the Ottawa River in the administrative region of Outaouais, Quebec, Canada
  - Rivière Saumon Ouest, a tributary of the Saumon River in the administrative region of Outaouais, Quebec, Canada
- Salmon River (disambiguation)
- Rivière aux Saumons (disambiguation)
