= Rivière aux Saumons =

Rivière aux Saumons may refer to:

- Rivière aux Saumons (Anticosti Island), a stream flowing into Gulf of St. Lawrence in Quebec Canada
- Rivière aux Saumons (Ashuapmushuan River tributary), a tributary of the Ashuapmushuan River in the administrative region of Saguenay–Lac-Saint-Jean, Quebec, Canada
- Rivière aux Saumons (Massawippi River tributary), a tributary of the Massawippi River in the administrative region of Estrie, Quebec, Canada

== See also ==
- Port au Saumon River, a tributary of the northwest shore of the St. Lawrence River in the Capitale-Nationale administrative region, Quebec, Canada
- Rivière à Saumon, a tributary of Wapustagamau Lake in the administrative region of Côte-Nord, Quebec, Canada
- Salmon River (disambiguation)
- Saumon River (Papineau), a tributary of the Ottawa River in the administrative region of Outaouais, Quebec, Canada
  - Rivière Saumon Ouest, a tributary of the Saumon River in the administrative region of Outaouais, Quebec, Canada
- Petite rivière aux Saumons, a tributary of the Ashuapmushuan River in Maria-Chapdelaine Regional County Municipality, Saguenay–Lac-Saint-Jean, Quebec, Canada
- Rivière au Saumon (disambiguation)
