= Lake Stukely =

Lake in Quebec, Canada

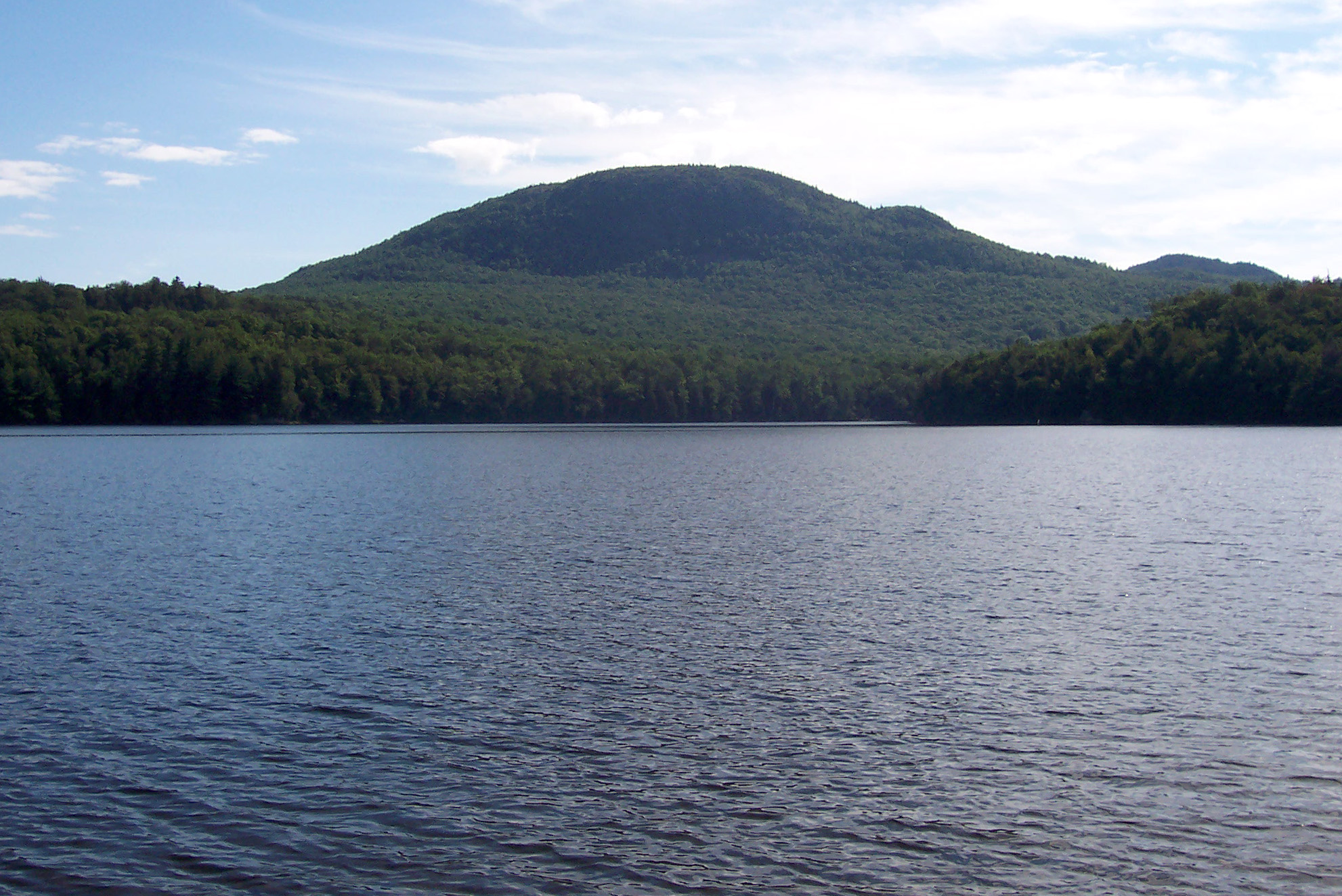
- Lake Stukely and Mont Chauve in Mont-Orford National Park.

- Location within Quebec
- Location: Quebec, Canada
- Coordinates: 45°22′31″N 72°22′31″W
- Type: Natural
- Primary inflows: Lac Stukely landfill (Rivière aux Herbages)
- Basin countries: Canada
- Max. length: 5.3 km (3.3 mi)
- Max. width: 1.6 km (0.99 mi)
- Surface area: 4 km^{2} (1.5 sq mi)
- Max. depth: 32 m (105 ft)
- Water volume: 53.1 km^{3} (43,000,000 acre⋅ft)
- Surface elevation: 285 m (935 ft)
- Islands: Miner Island

Lake Stukely is a 4 square kilometres (1.5 sq mi) natural lake located in the Eastern region of Quebec, Canada. Its waters border the municipalities of Orford, Bonsecours, Eastman and a large part of Mount Orford National Park. It lies at the head of the Saumon River watershed, giving it a fairly long retention time for its size.

The lake was left in a natural state throughout the 19th century, due to the lack of fertile land around it. This changed in the mid-20th century, with the creation of Mount Orford Park and the growth of the resort industry. The shores of the lake underwent several phases of second-home construction, and two campgrounds and a summer camp were created. The lake's natural beauty has been used as a backdrop for several television series.

== Toponymy ==
Lake Stukely is part of the township of Stukely, whose name has been attested since at least 1795, as it appears on the Gale and Duberger map of that period. This toponym is said to have originated from a homonymous village in the Huntingdonshire region of England, whose name is a distortion of the Old English styfic-[leah] meaning "snag ".

The lake was also known as "Bonnallie Lake" and "Bonnalay Lake", after a family who lived in the vicinity of the park. A 1905 postcard uses "Bonneta Lake ". In 1955, the Archdiocese of Sherbrooke applied to the Quebec Toponymy Commission to change the name to "lake Jouvence", after its summer camp. The Commission refused the request. In 1983, the association of lake residents asked the Toponymy Commission to choose between the names "Stukely" and "Bonnalay", which were also used locally. In 1985, the commission decided in favor of "Stukely", deemed older and more predominant; the association finally opted for "lac Stukely" in 1998.

== Geography ==
The lake is located at 45° 22' 31" north latitude and 72° 15' 07" west longitude. It lies 7 km northeast of the urbanized area of Eastman. It straddles the territories of the municipalities of Orford, Bonsecours and Eastman.

It is located in the Sutton Mountains natural region, in the Appalachian mountain range.

=== Geology ===
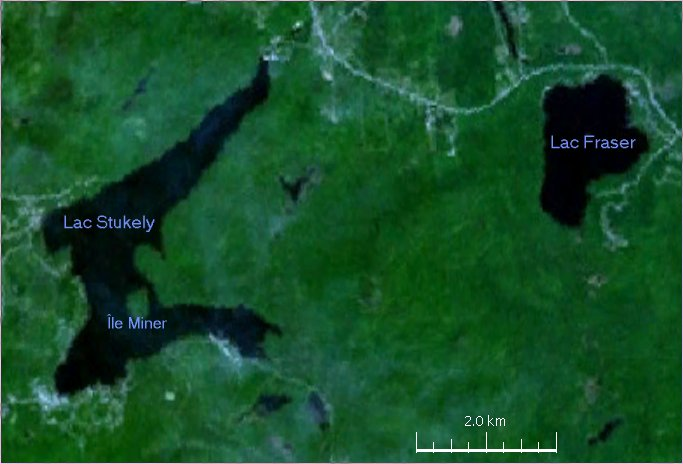
Satellite image of Lake Stukely.

Most of the lake's subsoil is composed of ophiolites derived from an obduction (overthrusting of an oceanic plate onto a continental plate) of the Iapetus Ocean, which occurs discontinuously in the Appalachians from the US border to Baie Verte on the island of New Foundland. It is composed of volcanic rocks, pyroxenite and gabbro. The eastern and western ends are located in a sedimentary formation composed of breccia of varying size and composition. All the rocks are of Cambrian and Ordovician age (542 to 443 million years BC).

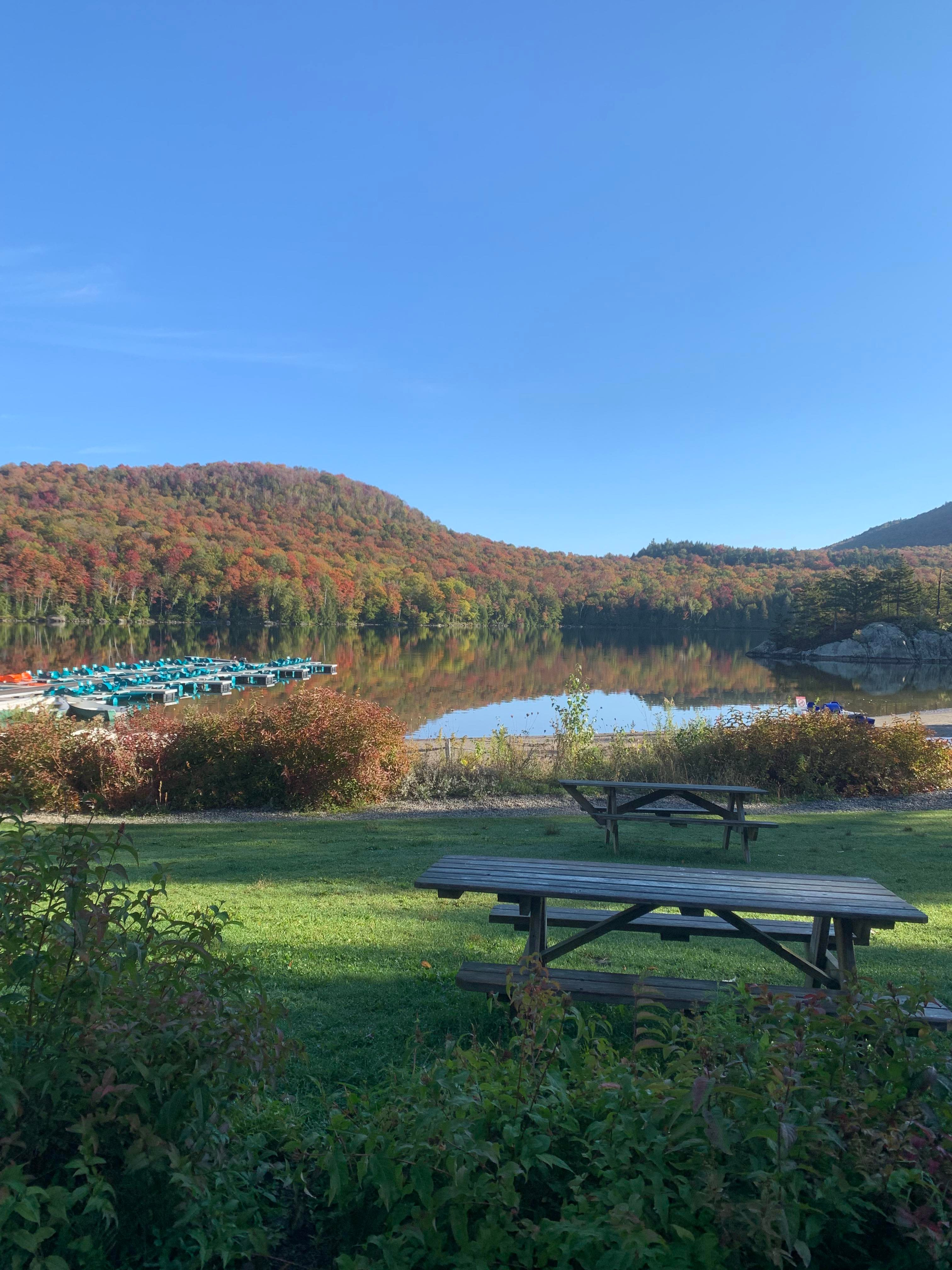
Lake Stukely as seen from the Mount Orford National Park location in 2021.

The Stukely Lake plateau separates Mount Chauve from Mount Orford. To the north of the lake are mixed deposits of sand and till, the result of glacial melting of the Cherry River. The lake deposits, covered by an organic layer, are almost a metre thick on the till near the lake's shores. The typical shoreline profile of the region's water bodies is defined by Léo Provencher of the University of Sherbrooke as "a gently sloping, boulder-strewn, sandy-gravelly beine, adjoined by a slight boulder slope and a moderately sloping till slope, all associated with a mixed tree canopy ".

=== Hydrology ===
The lake's watershed includes some 12 tributary streams with a total length of 12.5 km and covers an area of 18.2 km^{2}. Lac Stukely is the head lake of the watershednotes. (Note: A head lake is a lake located at the head of a watershed, i.e. fed almost exclusively by springs.) The lake discharges via an outlet in its northeastern part, the Lake Stukely outlet, whose flow is regulated by the Stukely dam built in 1950. After passing through the Chain of Lakes and Fraser Lake, its waters flow into the Saumon River and then the Saint-François River. The lake has a relatively long retention time of 4.03 years.

The lake itself covers an area of 4 km^{2}, with an average depth of 13 m and a maximum depth of 32 m. Its greatest dimensions are 5.3 km in length and 1.6 km in width, with an estimated water volume of 53,100,000 m³. Lake Stukely is 285 m above sea level. The lake's main island is Miner Island (surface area 19 acres or 0.077 km^{2}), part of the Mount Orford National Park territory.

The lake's water is considered very soft and slightly acidic, making it susceptible to pollution from acid rain. Its chemical and biological characteristics classify it as an oligotrophic to mesotrophic lake.

=== Land use ===
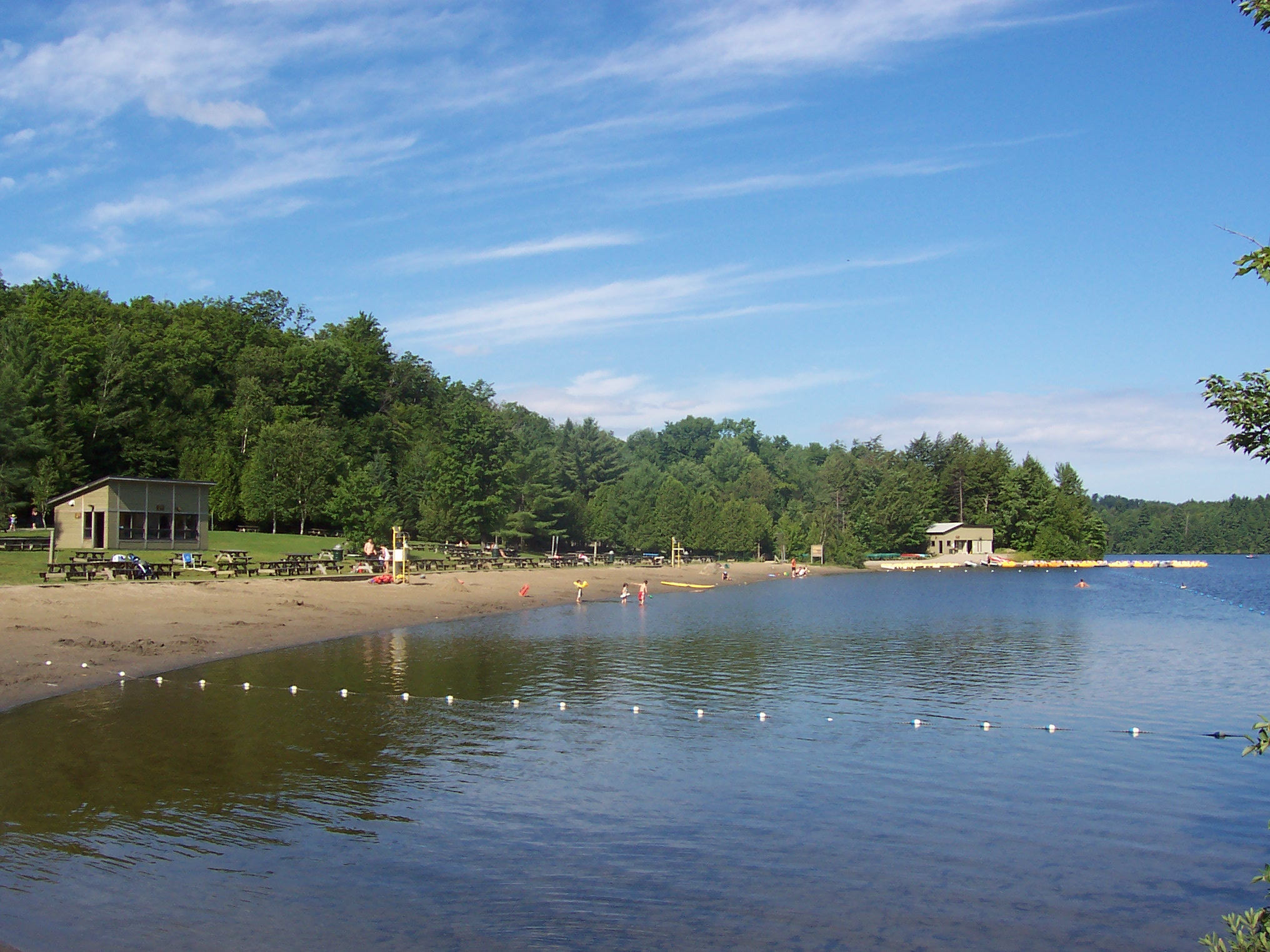
Stukely Lake beach in Mount Orford National Park

The eastern portion of its shoreline is occupied by Mount Orford National Park for approximately 12 km. Two sectors of the park are involved: the Jouvence sector and the Lac-Stukely sector. The latter includes a 358-site campground, some of which are lakeside, as well as a popular beach. Its 2,500-person capacity is often reached. There is also a boat launch for small craft. The Jouvence sector surrounds the resort of the same name, where outdoor activities with accommodation are practiced.

Land use in the watershed is predominantly forested, much of which is protected by the national park. Although agriculture and later logging were practiced in the 20th century, in 2008 forest cover occupied around 70% of the watershed, and water cover around 25%. Settled areas on the western edge of the lake account for around 3.5% of its surface area, wetlands for around 1%, and the remainder is made up of wasteland and cultivated land. Artificialization of the lake's shores is low, with 82% natural or 2.5% regenerating; only a small portion is ornamental (12.5%) or degraded (2.5%).

== Climate ==
Lake Stukely lies in the humid continental climate zone of the Köppen classification.

Magog weather survey (15 km southeast of Lake Stukely)
Month	Jan.	Feb.	March	April	May	June	July	Aug.	Sept.	Oct.	Nov.	Dec.	per year
Average minimum temperature (°C)	−14,9	−13,5	−7,3	−0,1	6,4	11,7	14,3	13,2	8,6	2,9	−2,9	−10,7	0,6
Average temperature (°C)	−10,4	−8,8	−2,8	4,6	12	16,9	19,4	18,2	13,3	7,1	0,5	−6,7	5,3
Average maximum temperature (°C)	−5,9	−4	1,7	9,3	17,5	22,1	24,5	23,2	18	11,4	3,9	−2,7	9,9
Rainfall (mm)	86,5	62	80,2	81,7	100,3	110,4	120,2	120	97,8	95,6	92,3	87,6	1 134,5
of which snow (cm)	63,4	45,1	45,5	16,5	0,3	0	0	0	0	2,1	27,9	58,2	259

Source: Environment Canada

== History ==
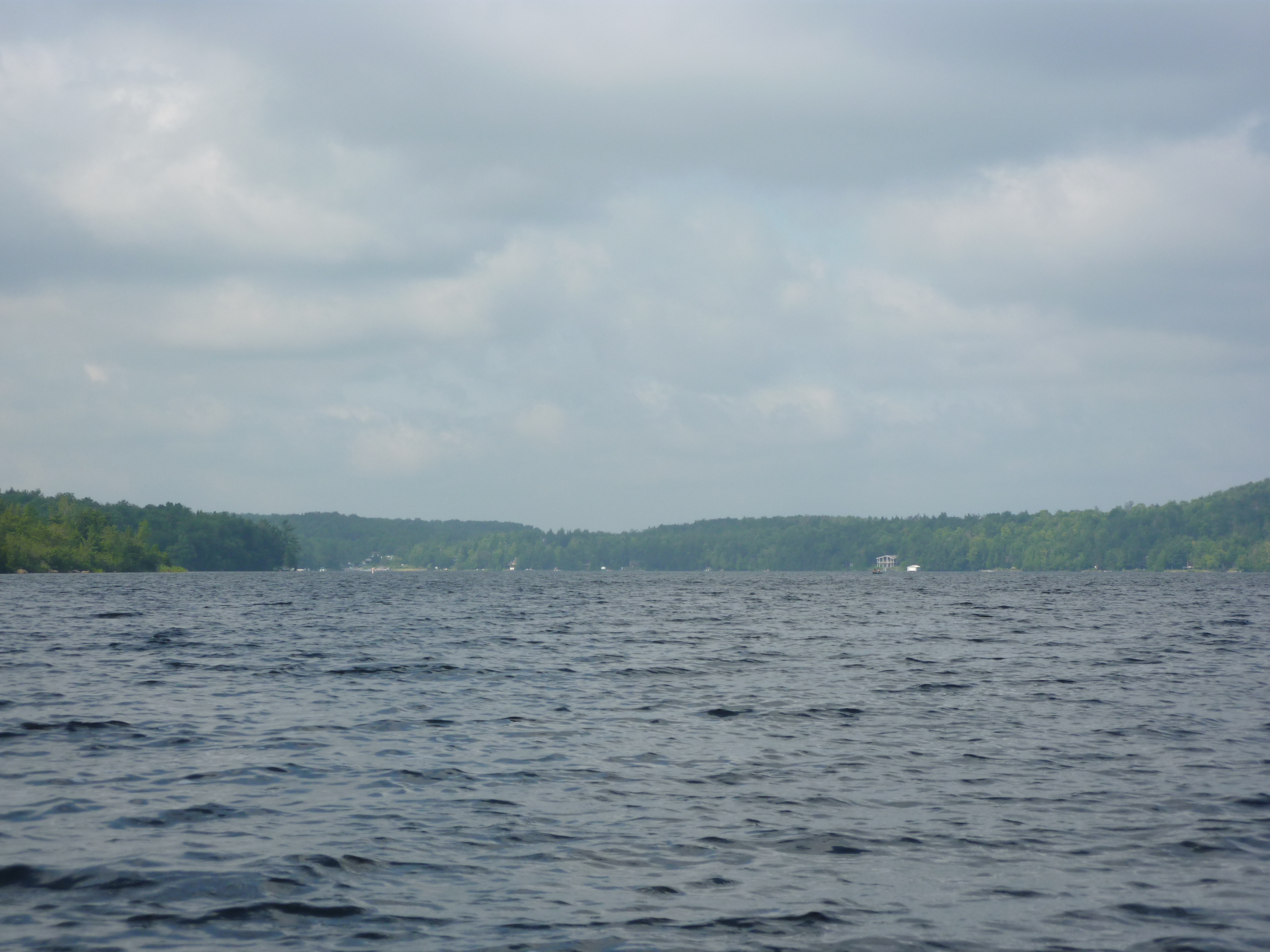
Westward view from a position on Lake Stukely opposite the beach of Mont-Orford Park. Human settlements are visible in the distance on the western shore of the lake.

Despite having been opened to settlement in the late eighteenth century via the townships of Stukely and Orford, the Stukely Lake area remained undeveloped due to its mountainous location and relatively unfertile land. A road linking Montreal to Sherbrooke was eventually built between 1834 and 1836 near the lake outlet; a coach service opened in 1837, stopping at "Bonnalie Mills", near the lake outlet. In 1905, a branch line of the Eastman-Valcourt railroad was built along the south shore of the lake to the present-day national park campground. The campground was used mainly for logging until 1920.

In 1944, the Miner family of Granby bought a large parcel of land northeast of the park to build a second home. The rest of the lake was mainly used for hunting and fishing until the 1950s.

Also in 1944, the Archdiocese of Sherbrooke purchased a hunting and fishing lodge near the lake outlet, to be used as a summer camp. Camp Jouvence initially welcomed young people from Catholic organizations for their human and Christian formation, and underwent several expansions until the 1960s. As the Quiet Revolution brought about a number of changes in Quebec, Camp Jouvence's mission underwent a change, as groups with a non-Christian nature, such as the Cercles des jeunes naturalistes, began to be welcomed both during the summer and winter months. Management of the site was handed over to a secular non-profit organization, which took over from the episcopate in 1970. In 1974, the site hosted the National Scout Rally. In 1976, the Quebec government acquired the site, which became Base de plein air Jouvence and was subsequently integrated into Mount Orford National Park. From the 1980s onwards, the site's usage continued to evolve, becoming open all four seasons and diversifying its range of leisure activities and accommodation types, welcoming youth groups and the general public. In 2010, the outdoor center employed 60 full-time and 125 casual workers.

In 1920, George Austin Bowen, a physician from Magog, sought to convince regional authorities to create a park to preserve the beauty of Mount Orford, thereby creating a place of tourism and recreation for the region. In 1929, just before the Great Depression, 1,200 acres (485 ha) were secured for this purpose, but the financial crisis put the project on hold for the short term. On April 8, 1938, the park creation act was passed, and it took the government more than four years to secure the park's original 41 km2. In 1967, to meet tourist demand for the 1967 World's Fair, the government built a 300-site campground southeast of the lake. An artificial beach was created out of a sand pit near Stukely. In 1975, the government acquired land in the northern sector of the park, including the Jouvence resort, north of the lake.

From 1958 onwards, the eastern shore of the lake underwent significant development with the construction of secondary residences. Over the years, three real-estate projects followed one another; the first, known as "Développement Normand", began in 1959 and comprised around 150 residences to the south-west of the lake. The second - the "Monbel" - took place to the west. Its 37 lots were completed in 196431. The last development - "Le Domaine des Étoiles" - is located to the west and comprises around 47 residences starting in 1995. A private campground with 164 sites, "Camping Normand", was built southwest of the lake in 1959.

A riverside owners' association was created in 1968.

== Flora and fauna ==
In 2002–2003, around 15 species of aquatic plants were recorded. The most common are the algae Chara and Nitella. Among the most common plants, there are also Eriocaulon Septangularis (Eriocaulon septangulare), Eurasian Water Milfoil (Myriophyllum spicatum), American Vallisneria (Vallisneria americana), Isoetes sp. and Dwarf Pondweed (Potamogeton pusillus).

The forest canopy along its banks is located in the bioclimatic domain of the eastern basswood maple stand, bordering on the yellow birch maple stand, and dominated by Sugar Maple (Acer saccharum). There are also eastern Hemlock (Tsuga canadensis), Eastern White Cedar (Thuya occidentalis), Balsam Fir (Abies balsamea) and Black Spruce (Picea mariana) on the shoreline on the Mont Chauve side, and White Pine (Pinus strobus) on Miner Island and the opposite shoreline.

The lake's zooplankton consists mainly of copepods, with a notable presence at the water's surface of cladocerans and protozoa.

Several species of fish inhabit the lake. Among the most common are Smallmouth Bass (Micropterus dolomieu), Brown Bullhead (Ameiurus nebulosus), Cyprinids, Sunfish (Lepomis gibbosus), Rainbow Smelt (Osmerus mordax), White Sucker (Catostomus commersonii) and Yellow Perch (Perca perca), Lake Trout (Salvelinus namaycush) and Rainbow Trout (Oncorhynchus mykiss).

The lake's surroundings are home to five reptile species, including the Snapping Turtle (Chelydra serpentina) and Painted Turtle (Chrysemys picta). It is also inhabited by sixteen species of amphibians, including the Green Newt (Notophthalmus viridescens), the Green Frog (Lithobates clamitans), the Northern Frog (Lithobates septentrionalis) and the Bullfrog (Lithobates catesbeianus).

Aquatic birds include the Bald Eagle (Haliaeetus leucocephalus), Osprey (Pandion haliaetus), Canada Goose (Branta canadensis), Wood Duck (Aix sponsa), Mallard (Anas platyrhynchos), Black Duck (Anas rubripes). Green-winged Teal (Anas crecca), Ring-necked Duck (Aythya collaris), Bufflehead (Bucephala albeola), Common Goldeneye (Bucephala clangula), Common Merganser (Mergus merganser), common Merganser (Lophodytes cucullatus), common Loon (Gavia immer), Pied-billed Grebe (Podilymbus podiceps), Double-crested Cormorant (Phalacrocorax auritus), American Bittern (Botaurus lentiginosus), Green Heron (Butorides virescens), Great Blue Heron (Ardea herodias), Spotted Redhorse (Actitis macularius), Solitary Redhorse (Tringa solitaria), Wilson's Snipe (Gallinago delicata), American Woodcock (Scolopax minor), Hudsonian Gull (Larus smithsonianus), Ring-billed Gull (Larus delawarensis) and American Kingfisher (Megaceryle alcyon).

Among the mammals found on the lake in the Mont-Orford National Park sector are the Muskrat (Ondatra zibethicus), River Otter (Lontra canadensis), Moose (Alces alces) and Canadian Beaver (Castor canadensis). Beavers are very abundant in the area between the lake and Mount Chauve, and this region was given the name La Castorie, a name still attributed to a nearby pond.

== Pop culture ==
As the shores of Lake Stukely are sparsely populated, it has been featured in several Canadian TV series. CF-RCK uses the lake landscape as a background setting. The series Le Courrier du roy and Rue de l'anse use it for their outdoor scenes. The Radisson series and Jean Pierre Lefebvre's movie Mon amie Pierrette may also have used the lake for a few scenes.

== See also ==
- Mont-Orford National Park
- List of lakes of Quebec

== Bibliography ==
- Desautels, Claude (May 2010). Lac Stukely: Son histoire, son développement, son association (PDF). Eastman: Association pour la protection de l’environnement du Lac Stukely inc. ISBN 978-2-9811968-1-1.
- Lalande, Francine (2001). Parc national du Mont-Orford: Synthèse des connaissances (PDF).
- Poirier, Dominic; Dubois, Maïtée (October 2008). Diagnostic environnemental global du bassin versant du Lac Stukely (PDF). Sherbrooke: Regroupement des associations pour la protection de l’environnement des lacs et des cours d’eau de l’Estrie et du haut bassin de la rivière Saint-François.
