= Cherry River (Quebec) =

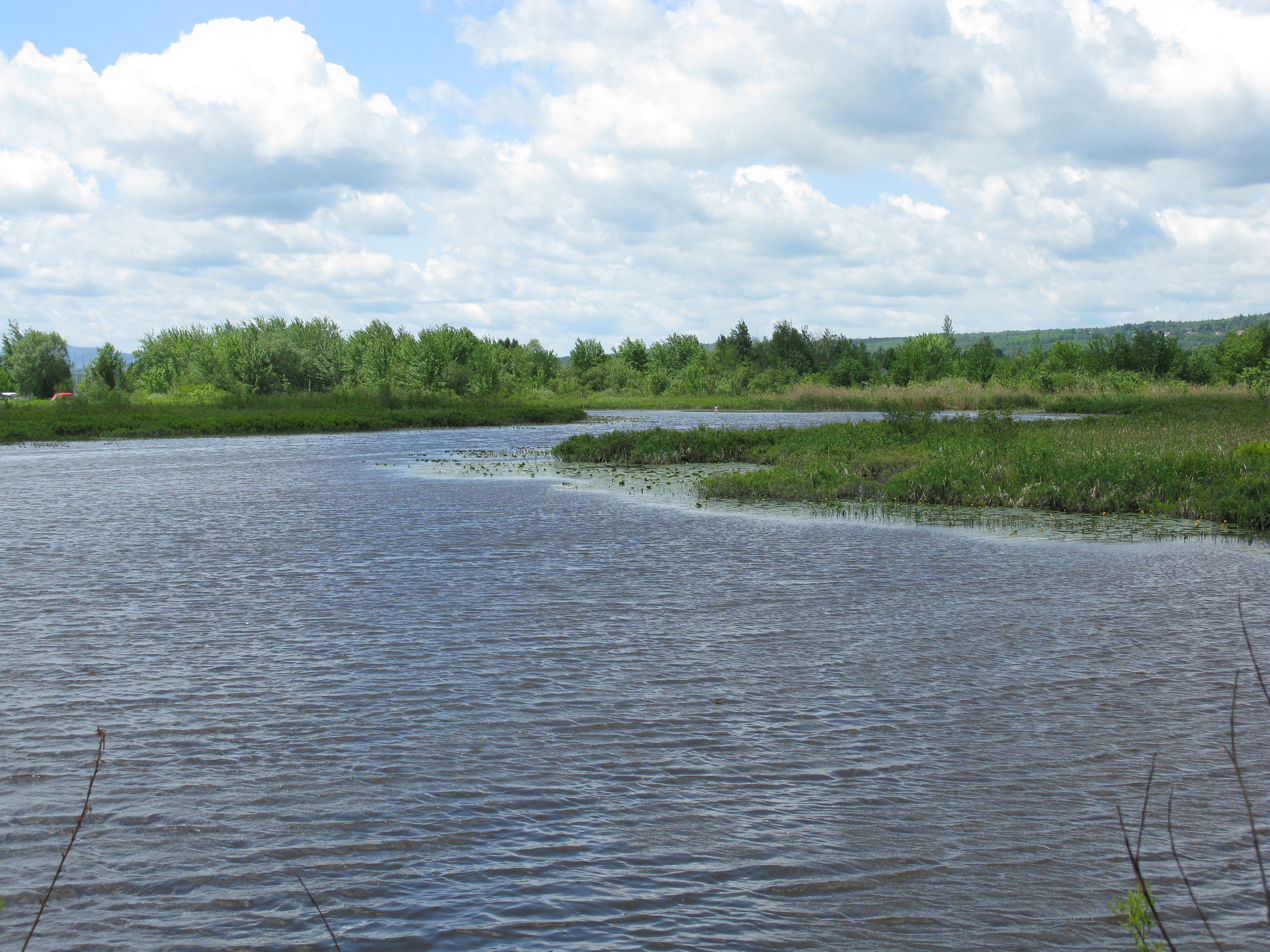
- A riverbend in the Cherry River
- Native name: Rivière aux Cerises (French)

Location
- Country: Canada
- Province: Quebec
- Administrative region: Estrie

Physical characteristics
- Source
  - location: Orford (secteur Saint-Élie d'Orford), Étang de la source
- Mouth
  - location: Sherbrooke (secteur Deauville), Lake Memphremagog
  - coordinates: 45°16′13″N 72°10′16″W
  - elevation: 204 m
- Length: 11.9 km (7.4 mi)

Basin features
- Tributaries
  - left: Branche de l'Est (East Branch), ruisseau de la Cuvette (Cuvette Creek).
  - right: Ruisseau du Grand Rocher.

The Cherry River or Rivière aux Cerises is a river in Magog, Quebec that is part of the Lake Memphremagog watershed. This river flows through the cities Orford, then Magog, in the Memphremagog Regional County Municipality, in the administrative region of Estrie, in Quebec, in Canada.

The river was flooded by the creation of dams in the late 19th century, creating a permanent wetland around it.

== Geography ==
The main hydrographic slopes adjacent to the "Cherry River" are:

- North side: Key Creek (ruisseau Key);
- East side: Magog River, Red Creek (ruisseau Rouge), Dorman Creek, Meadow Creek, Saint-François River;
- South side: Lake Memphremagog;
- West side: Gagné stream, Montjoie Lake.

The "Cherry River" originates from "Etang aux Cerises", located south-east of Lake Stukely, south of Fraser Lake, northeast of Mount Orford, and Northwest of the center of the village of Cherry River. L'Étang aux Cerises receives the waters from:

- the northwest slope of Mount Orford by the "Grand Crescent Creek" and the "Billot Creek";
- the north slope of the "Hill of Pines" (Colline des Pins);
- the north, through Mai Creek (which receives the waters of Perdu Creek).

From the landfill of the "Etang des Cerises", the Cherry River runs for 11.9 km depending on the following segments:

- 2.0 km southeast in forest zone through Sayat-Nova Pond, to the confluence of Cuvette Creek (coming from the north and constituting the outlet of "Lac de la Cuvette");
- 0.8 km southeast to the "Grand Rocher Creek" (west of the Lynx Peak);
- 1.0 km southeastward passing south of the hamlets of Cherry River and Chéribourg, to confluence with Castle Creek (from the north);
- 0.9 km to the south, to the confluence of the "Branche de l'Est" creek, which drains the "Lac à la Truite" upstream;
- 4.0 km to the south, parallel to (on the east side) of Red Creek, to Highway 10;
- 3.2 km to the mouth of the river, crossing a marsh area, the railway and route 112.

The Cherry River flows to the bottom of a small bay on the Magog Bay on the north shore of Lake Memphremagog next to Cabana Point in the Deauville area. The route 112 crosses the "rivière aux Cerises" at its confluence with Lake Memphremagog. After crossing a small bay, towards the south, the current crosses under the railway bridge located on the north shore of Lake Memphremagog.

== Toponymy ==
Cherry is the fruit of the cherry tree. In this region, cherries are ripe in the middle of summer. The term "Cherry" is related to several place names in this area: the pond, the "Cherry River" hamlet, the marsh and the river.

The toponym "rivière aux Cerises" was officially registered on December 5, 1968, at the Commission de toponymie du Québec.

== See also ==
- Orford, a municipality
- List of rivers of Quebec
