= Salmon River (Vancouver Island) =

Coordinates: 50°22′23″N 125°55′47″W

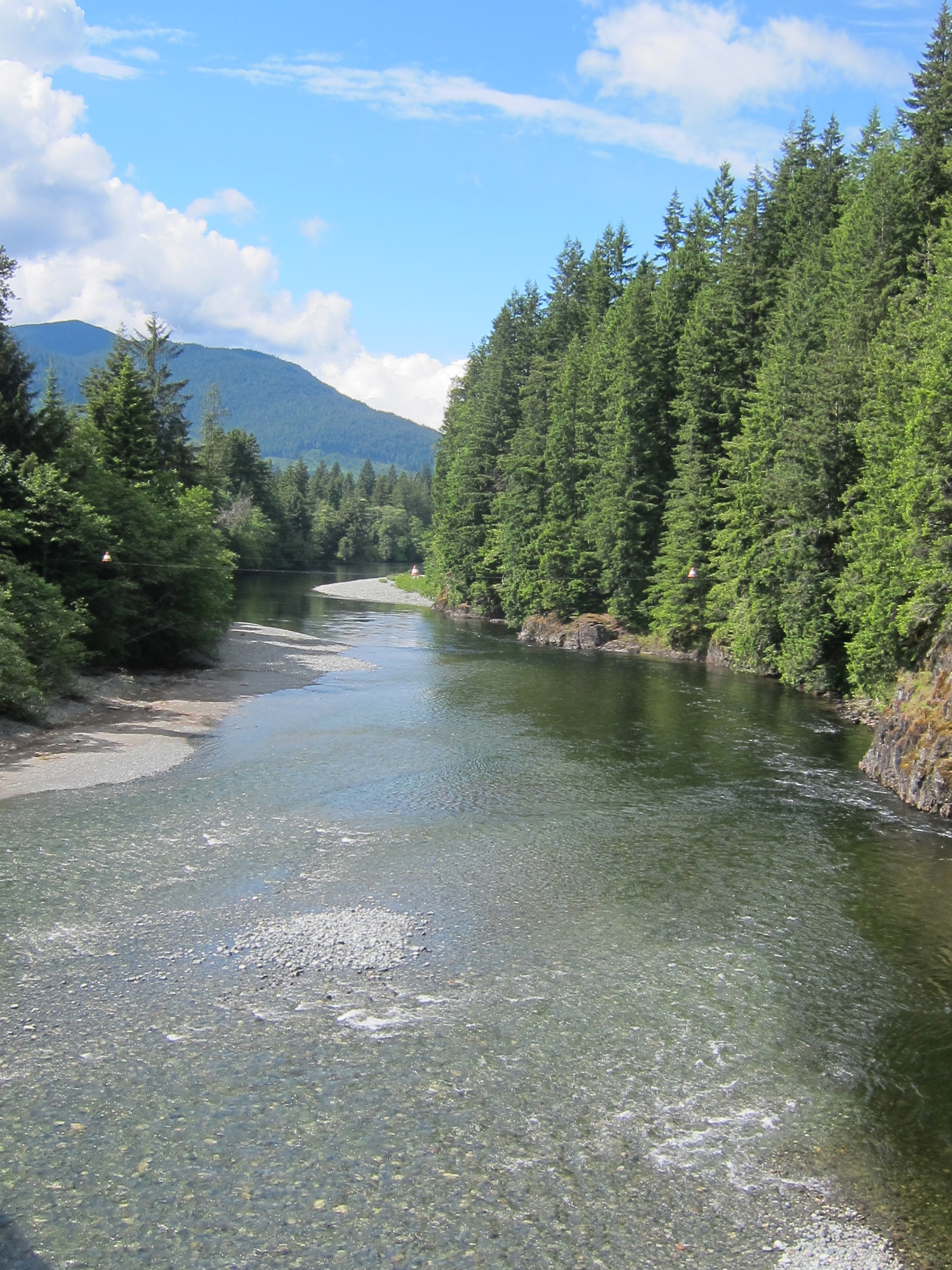
The Salmon River near Sayward, British Columbia

The Salmon River is a river in the north of Vancouver Island in British Columbia, Canada. Its headwaters lie in Strathcona Park. It flows northwest, through the Sayward Valley into Kelsey Bay next to the village of Sayward before finally entering Johnstone Strait. The river supports steelhead and several species of Pacific salmon.

== See also ==
- List of rivers of British Columbia
