= Salmon River =

Salmon River may refer to:

== Canada ==
=== British Columbia ===
- Salmon River (Fraser River), in the Central Interior
- Salmon River (Haida Gwaii), on Moresby Island
- Salmon River (Langley), in the Lower Fraser Valley
- Salmon River (Portland Canal), in northwestern British Columbia
- Salmon River (Shuswap Lake), near Salmon Arm
- Salmon River (Vancouver Island), near Kelsey Bay
- The Salmo River, in the West Kootenay region, was known historically as the Salmon River
- The Pa-aat River, on Pitt Island in the North Coast region, was formerly called the Salmon River

=== New Brunswick ===
- Salmon River (New Brunswick)

=== Nova Scotia ===
- Salmon River (Nova Scotia), in Colchester County
  - Salmon River, Colchester County (community), a community located along this river
- Salmon River, Digby County
- Salmon River, Richmond County

=== Ontario ===
- Salmon River (Ontario)

== United States ==
- Salmon River (Alaska) any of several rivers in Alaska
- Salmon River (California)
- Salmon River (Connecticut)
- Salmon River (Idaho), known as the River of No Return, the largest US river with this name
- Salmon River (New York), a tributary of Lake Ontario
- Salmon River (Lake Champlain), south of Plattsburgh, New York
- Salmon River (Clackamas County, Oregon)
- Salmon River (Lincoln County, Oregon)
- Salmon River (Washington)

== See also ==
- King Salmon River (disambiguation)
- Rivière au Saumon (disambiguation)
- Rivière aux Saumons (disambiguation)
- Salmon Creek (disambiguation)
- Salmon Branch, Tennessee, United States
