= Two Against Tyre =

"Two Against Tyre" is a story based on an unpublished story featuring Eithriall the Gaul, one of the lesser-known characters created by American writer Robert E. Howard. The story celebrated the pageantry of medieval knighthood, the exoticism of the Orient, the ferocity of the invaders from the steppes, the mysteries of the seraglio and the rise and fall of great dynasties. It was adapted by Marvel Comics into the Conan The Barbarian comics episode Two Against Turan, with major changes in the story line.

== Publication history ==
=== Original story ===
“Two Against Tyre” is a Historical fiction adventure story featuring Eithriall the Gaul, based on an unfinished draft (originally untitled) by prolific Texas pulp writer Robert E. Howard. It is set in the Phoenician city of Tyre at the height of its commercial and political power, at the time of an Assyrian King named Shalmaneser. Of the five known kings of that name, the data in the story fits either Shalmaneser III (859–824 BC) or Shalmaneser V (727–722 BC) - both of them powerful warrior kings with vast imperial ambitions, who both feature prominently in the Old Testament.

- Howard enthusiast Glenn Lord published a version of “Two Against Tyre” in issue #12 (Spring 1970) of his magazine "The Howard Collector". Lord also included it in the 1979 book, also named "The Howard Collector", published by Ace Books and including the best of the material published during the magazine's 1961-1973 existence.
- It was printed in 1975, by the publisher Dennis McHaney in a limited Chapbook Edition. McHaney's other booklet that year, Two Against Tyre, consisted of 900 unnumbered copies, and 600 numbered copies on deluxe paper - using the title of the short story, as the title of the book and lead material in a collection of other REH material.
- The Zebra Books Berkley "Second Book of Robert E. Howard" also included versions of this short story.

Altogether, the story has been published in the following ways:

1. The Howard Collector (magazine) #12, Glenn Lord, Spring 1970
2. Two Against Tyre, Dennis McHaney, 1975
3. The Second Book Of Robert E. Howard, Zebra Books, May 1976
4. The Howard Collector (book), Ace Books, April 1979
5. The Second Book Of Robert E. Howard, Berkley, March 1980
6. Lord of Samarcand and Other Adventure Tales of the Old Orient, Bison Books, Ap

=== Conan version (comics) ===
The non-Conan story "Two Against Tyre," was adapted for Marvel Comics publication into the Conan story "Two Against Turan" - published in Marvel's "Conan the Barbarian (comics)" #29, August 1973. It was written from a script by Roy Thomas, and pencils by John Buscema, inks by Ernie Chan (as "Ernie Chua"). In this version it featured an early segment in the adventures of the Cimmerian hero - the start of Conan's long and highly ambiguous relationship with the powerful eastern kingdom of Turan.

Robert E. Howard is, of course, immediately associated with Conan the Barbarian, but he was a popular pulp writer in many genres. Many volumes collect a large portion of his other works, for example, Westerns and fight stories as well as his lesser-known sword and sorcery adventures. To fulfill the need for original Conan adventures, based on original Howard material, many such published and unpublished Howard stories were adapted as Conan yarns, either stories or comics - rewritten by various other writers to fit plausibly into the known career of Conan.

Eithriall the Gaul was especially suited to be transformed into Conan, as the two are virtually identical - in physical and mental abilities, in basic attitude to life and in the specific situation of a Barbarian finding his way in a supposedly civilized city. Like Conan, Eithriall even repeatedly uses the name of the god Crom as an expletive. The only clear difference is that Eithriall is blond-haired while Conan's hair is black. Howard regarded Conan's Cimmerians as ancestors of the Celts, which include the Gauls. It would fit Howard's general scheme to consider Eithriall a remote descendant, or a later reincarnation, of Conan.

However, the transformation of "Two Against Tyre" into "Two Against Turan" was not limited to changing names and backgrounds. The Marvel Comics adaptors took up the first part of the Howard story line, but then led it in a completely different direction - adding a strong element of sorcery absent from the original Howard story which is pure historical fiction. Even the meaning of the title was reversed - "Two Against Tyre" referred to the protagonist Eithriall and a comrade in arms which he finds in the city, while "Two Against Turan" refers to two enemies of Turan whom Conan defeats.

Publication details:

- "Two Against Turan!" - Adapted from Robert E. Howard's "Two Against Tyre"

Publisher: Marvel Comics - Conan the Barbarian (Vol 1) 29-A by Marvel

Credits:

- John Buscema; Artist
- Ernie Chan (aka Ernie Chua); Inker
- John Costanza; Letterer
- Glynis Oliver / Glynis Wein; Colorist
- Roy Thomas; Editor
- Robert E. Howard; Writer (original)
- Roy Thomas; Writer (comics adaptation)

== Plot summary ("Two Against Tyre") ==
Eithriall the Gaul has arrived in Tyre, known as "The World's Richest Capital" - partly seeking adventure and fortune, partly in search of a man named Shamash - apparently an Assyrian - who had done him an (unspecified) wrong and on whom he seeks revenge. Even in cosmopolitan Tyre, Eithriall attracts attention as a particularly outlandish "Barbarian". Witnessing what seems a funeral procession with hundreds of women crying "The Tammuz is dead!" Eithriall - unfamiliar with the Phoenician cult of the Dead and Reborn God Tammuz/Adonis - asks an innocent question which is misunderstood as mocking the god, setting the mob afire. The Gaul fights back the blood-thirsty crowd, but is nearly overwhelmed when given timely refuge by a man calling himself Ormraxes the Mede.

Eithriall feels an immediate kinship with this man, seeing in him a fellow Barbarian - though one much much more familiar with Tyrian civilization. Sitting together in an inn, Ormraxes explains the political situation: Shalmaneser, King of Assyria, already rules the world's biggest Empire, but he seeks to expand further westwards. The Princes of Syria are banding together to block the Assyrian expansion into their territory. This is of great interest to Eithriall, who thinks of enlisting as a mercenary with one of these Princes - but before he could ask further, soldiers of the King of Tyre burst in, seeking to arrest Ormraxes, whom they call "Khumri". The two fight back to back, but are overwhelmed.

Eithriall is stunned and left for dead. He wakes in a room with a group of men, one of whom is tending his wounds. Their leader, Akuros - a rich Tyrian merchant - explains that he is a friend of Khumri and asks Eithriall to help free him from the king's dungeons. Eithriall immediately agrees, since Ormraxes/Khumri had saved his own life. It turns out that Khumri is an agent of the anti-Assyrian coalition; the King of Tyre, an Assyrian ally, intends to turn him over to Shalmaneser, who would flay him alive. Akuros heads a secret anti-Assyrian faction in Tyre, though he cannot act openly.

The escape is successfully effected - some of the guards are bribed, and Eithriall fights and kills those who remain. Khumri is freed in the nick of time, just before the Assyrian King's men were to take him. A boat arranged by Akuros takes them out of the island-city of Tyre. Before their departure, Akuros and Khumri make two agreements: A political one - after the anti-Assyrian coalition wins, there will be no retaliation against Tyre for its king's support of the Assyrians; and also a personal commercial agreement - Khumri will buy from Akuros cedar wood, lapis lazuli and precious stones. Akuros addresses Khumri as "My Lord" and treats him with great deference; obviously, he is a far more important person than Eithriall (or the reader) realized. Khumri and Eithriall then ride eastwards to further adventures, which Howard never got around to writing.

Had Howard written a sequel, Eithriall would have likely found himself involved in the crucial Battle of Karkar (853 BC), where the valiant rulers of Western Syria (among them King Ahab of Old Testament fame) did halt the Assyrian imperial advance, at least for one generation (though at a later the time the Assyrians, led by a later Shalmaneser, came back in an overwhelming strength).

== Plot summary ("Two Against Turan") ==
Conan of Cimmeria has made it to Aghrapur, capitol of Turan. He witnesses a procession of the idol of the Tarim, honored god among Turanians, and blunders when he mocks the god, setting the mob afire. The Cimmerian fights back the blood-thirsty crowd, and is given timely refuge by Eithriall...or is it Ormraxes?...who needs the help of a burly ally. They are set upon by soldiers of King Yildiz. Eithriall is captured and Conan left for dead. When Conan awakes, a hooded man tends his wounds and feeds him, requesting that Conan help rescue Eithriall. This Conan does, returning him to the hooded man. The man removes the hood to unveil that he is identical to Eithriall... in fact, that Eithriall is a wizard, and the two are separated halves of each other, who must reunite or perish. Conan learns that, once reunited, the wizard will be a dark force pledged to crushing all of Turan. Conan ends the threat before it is unstoppable by throwing a dagger into the jewel that is used remerge Eithriall together with Ormraxes. The two burst into flames and end any future plans of "crushing Turan for all time". Turan soldiers enter into the house, seeing the Cimmerian standing in front of piles of smoldering ashes. In consideration of this, Conan is offered a place with the Turanian army's special units.

As readers of the Conan saga know, in later parts of his career Conan will become a staunch enemy of Turan and lead various forces of robbers and marauders against its outposts and commerce, on both land and sea - a narrated in such stories as "The Devil in Iron".
