= Salmon Creek =

Salmon Creek may refer to:

== Streams in the United States ==
- Salmon Creek (Walker Creek tributary) in Marin County, California
- Salmon Creek (Sonoma County, California)
- Little Salmon Creek (Mendocino County), California
- Big Salmon Creek (California), also in Mendocino County
- Salmon Creek (Housatonic River), a tributary of the Housatonic River in Connecticut
- Little Salmon River (Lake Ontario), Oswego County, New York
- Salmon Creek (Cayuga Lake), Tompkins County, New York
- Salmon Creek (Clark County, Washington)
- Salmon Creek (Black River tributary), Thurston County, Washington
- Salmon Creek (Skookumchuck River tributary), Thurston County, Washington

== Inhabited places ==
- Salmon Creek, California
- Salmon Creek, California, the former name of Beatrice, Humboldt County, California
- Salmon Creek, Washington

== Other ==
- Salmon Creek Middle School, in Occidental, California
- Salmon Creek, a wine brand of the Bronco Wine Company

== See also ==
- Salmon Branch, a creek in Tennessee
- Salmon River (disambiguation)
