= Salmon House =

Salmon House may refer to:

== Houses ==
- W. S. Salmon House, is a house in southeast Portland, Oregon, United States, listed on the National Register of Historic Places.
- George Salmon House, South Carolina, United States
- Salmon Washburn House, an historic house in Taunton, Massachusetts, United States
- Salmon-Stohlman House, an historic home in Somerset, Maryland, United States

== Places ==
- Salmon House Falls, at the confluence of the Dean and Takia Rivers in British Columbia, Canada. The location is referred to also as Salmon House

== See also ==
- Salmon (disambiguation)
