= Salman Khan (disambiguation) =

Salman Khan (born 1965) is an Indian actor, narrator, singer, and television presenter.

Salman Khan may also refer to:

- Sal Khan (born 1976), American educator and entrepreneur
- Salman Khan (Indian cricketer) (born 1998)
- Salman Khan (Pakistani cricketer) (born 1971)
- Salman Khan (rower), Indian rower (born 1998)
- Salman Yusuff Khan (born 1985), Indian dancer
- Salman Khan Baloch (born 1976), Pakistani politician
- Salman Khan Ustajlu (died 1623), Turkoman military leader

== See also ==
- Salman Khan filmography, filmography of the Indian actor
- Salman Khan Films, Indian film production company
- Salman (disambiguation)
- Khan (disambiguation)
