= Salman (myth) =

South Arabian god

A god worshiped in pre-Islamic South Arabia. Salman may have been the same as a West Semitic god called Shalman/Shalaman, which some scholars believe survives as a theophoric element in the names Solomon and Shalmaneser. The deity is also attested in texts from Ugarit, Palmyra, Hatra, and North and South Arabia.

== See also ==
- Salman (name)
