= Salmone =

Salmone (meaning salmon in Italian) may refer to:

- Salmone (Elis), a town of ancient Elis, Greece
- Monte Salmone, a mountain in the Alps
- Cape Salmone, Crete, mentioned in the Bible in Acts 27:7
- Salmone Creek, Vancouver, Washington
- Salmone (A 5430), lead ship of the Italian Navy Classe Salmone minesweepers

== See also ==
- Salmon (disambiguation)
