= Sayward =

- Village
- Village of Sayward
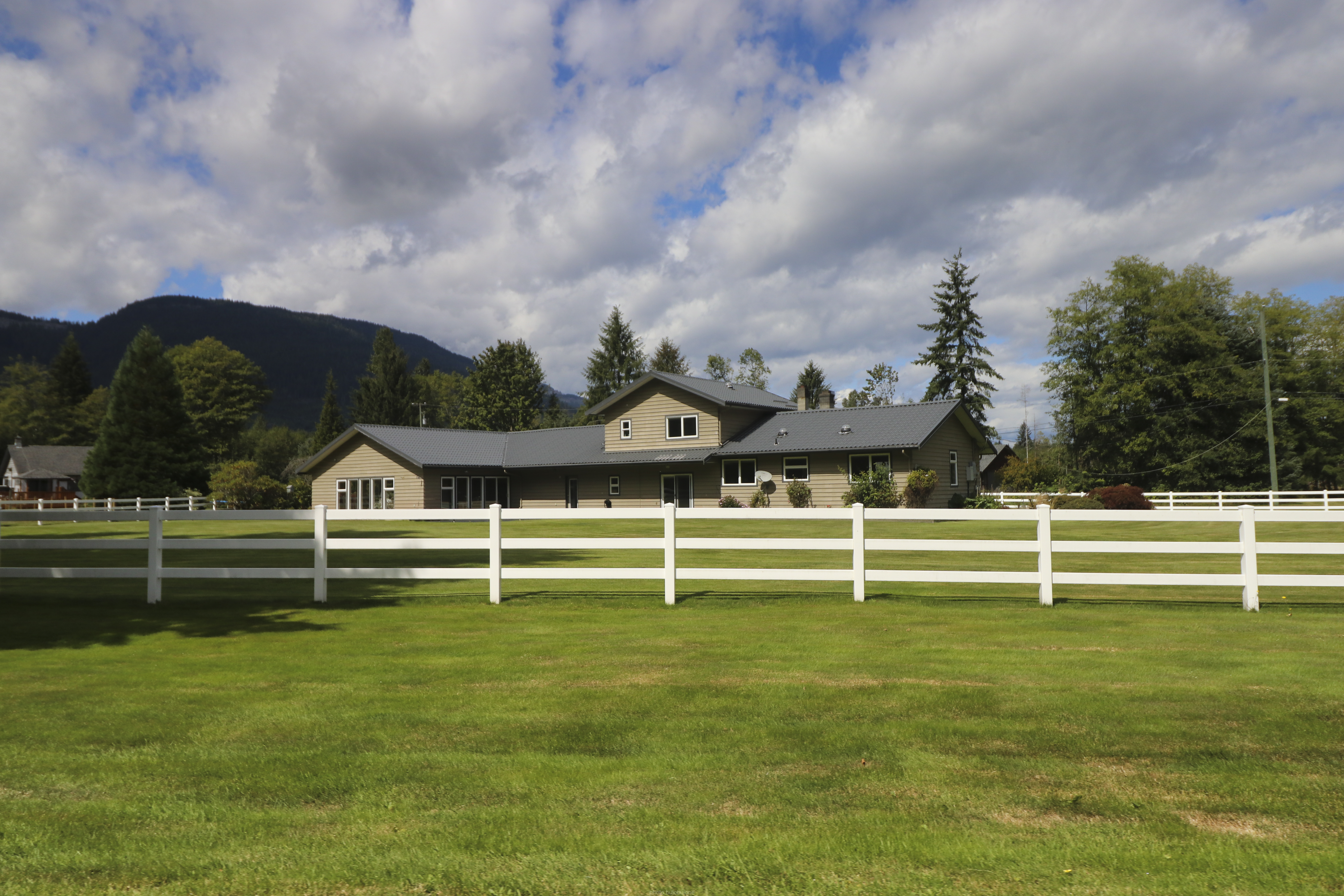

- Location of Sayward in British Columbia Sayward (British Columbia)
- Coordinates: 50°23′1″N 125°57′37″W
- Country: Canada
- Province: British Columbia
- Region: Vancouver Island
- Regional district: Strathcona
- Incorporated: 1968

Government
  - Governing body: Sayward Village Council
  - Mayor: Mark Baker

Area
  - Total: 4.72 km^{2} (1.82 sq mi)
- Elevation: 30 m (98 ft)

Population (2006)
  - Total: 311
  - Density: 72.2/km^{2} (187/sq mi)
- Time zone: UTC−07:00 (PT)
- Highways: 19
- Waterways: Johnstone Strait
- Website: Official website

Sayward is a village located in the Sayward Valley on the northeast coast of Vancouver Island in British Columbia, Canada. It is about 1.6 kilometres (1 mi) inland from Kelsey Bay on a spur from Highway 19.

The village (like its West Kootenays namesake) was called after William Parsons Sayward, a successful Victoria lumber merchant who was born in Maine in 1818 and came to Victoria from California in 1858. The 2016 population of the village was 311, down from 341 in 2006 and 379 in 2001. The village lies off the coast of Hardwicke Island.

== Demographics ==
In the 2021 Census of Population conducted by Statistics Canada, Sayward had a population of 334 living in 166 of its 182 total private dwellings, a change of 7.4% from its 2016 population of 311. With a land area of 4.44 km^{2} (1.71 sq mi), it had a population density of 75.2/km^{2} (194.8/sq mi) in 2021.

== See also ==
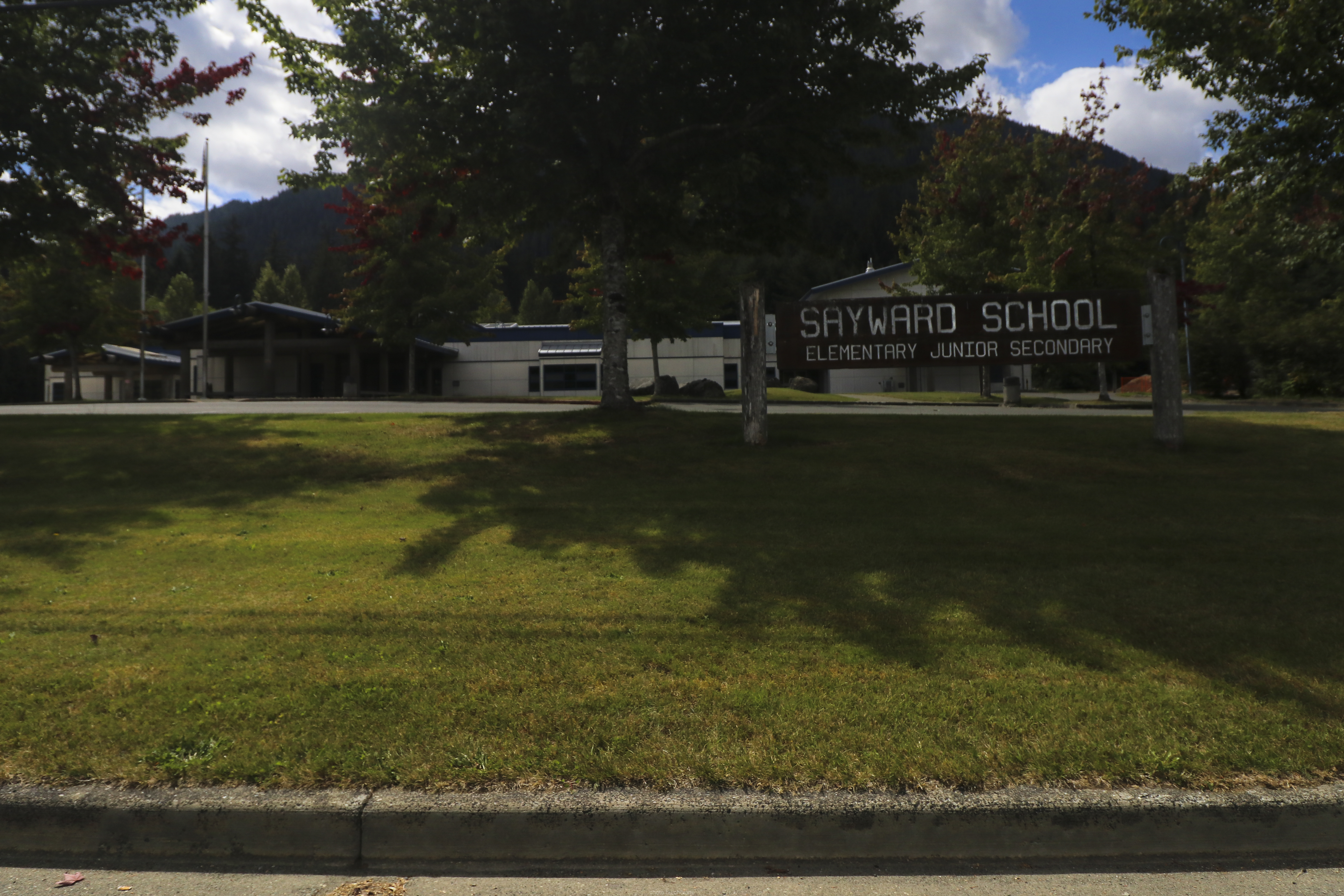
Sayward School

- Sayward Valley
