= Salman =

Salman may refer to:

== People ==
- Salman (name), people with the name

== Places in Iran ==
- Salman, Khuzestan, a village in Khuzestan Province
- Salman, alternate name of Deh-e Salman, Lorestan, a village in Lorestan Province
- Salman, Razavi Khorasan, a village in Razavi Khorasan Province
- Salman, alternate name of Salami, Iran, a city in Razavi Khorasan Province
- Salman, Semnan, a village in Semnan Province
- Salman, Tehran, a village in Tehran Province
- Salman, Zanjan, a village in Zanjan Province

== Other ==
- Salman (myth), a god worshipped in pre-Islamic southern Arabia

== See also ==
- David S. Weiss, Salman on the Dennis Miller radio show
- Salmon, fish species
- Salmon (disambiguation)
- Solomon (disambiguation)
