= Salmon River (Haida Gwaii) =

Coordinates: 52°42′09″N 131°49′01″W

The Salmon River is a river on Moresby Island in the Haida Gwaii archipelago of the North Coast of British Columbia, Canada, flowing northeast into McEchran Cove.

== See also ==
- List of rivers of British Columbia
- Salmon River (disambiguation)
