= Salmon River (Alaska) =

There are several rivers named Salmon River in Alaska.

- Salmon River (Portland Canal) arises from Salmon Glacier in British Columbia and flows through Hyder, Alaska.
- Salmon River (Kobuk River) arises in the Baird Mountains of the Brooks Range and flows 60 miles south to join the Kobuk River.
- The Sheenjek River was formerly named the Salmon River.

Other Salmon Rivers in Alaska include one on Chichagof Island (name may not be in current use), one arising in Glacier Bay National Monument and running through Gustavus, Alaska, one emptying into Kuskokwim Bay, and one a tributary of the Aniak River. The name is also listed as a synonym for several other rivers and is applied to a distributary watercourse of the South Fork, Kuskokwim River.

== See also ==
- King Salmon River four rivers in Alaska
- Salmon Creek Dam power dam on Salmon Creek near Juneau
- King Salmon Creek, British Columbia, Canada
- Salmon River (disambiguation)
