= Kelsey Bay =

Coordinates: 50.400°N 125.967°W

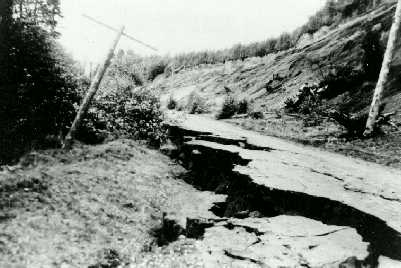
The 1946 soil failure north of Campbell River on Kelsey Bay Highway

Kelsey Bay is a small coastal settlement located in the Sayward Valley on northern Vancouver Island in British Columbia about 1 mi (1.6 km) from the community of Sayward. The wharf at Kelsey Bay was previously the southern terminus for the B.C. Ferries Inside Passage route until 1978, when Highway 19 was extended north to Port Hardy and the terminus relocated there. Kelsey Bay is part of the Village of Sayward.

== History ==
Charles William Kelsey and his family moved to Kelsey Bay from the State of Washington in 1906. They originally were headed for Alaska. They stopped at Topaz Harbour, started hand-logging and never did get to Alaska. They moved from Hardwicke Island in a scow-house which was their unique floating home. This was beached at the beginning of the rock cut and continued to be their home for some years. In January 1925, they moved to the wharf, operated a store-telegraph office and founded the post office which was named in their honor, which became The Kelsey Bay Post Office. The town was named after them. This is documented by Frances Duncan, granddaughter of William Kelsey. Mrs. Duncan still lives in Sayward and is 83 years old. During the summer months a Canadian Coast Guard Inshore Rescue Boat Station is located in Kelsey Bay The station is staffed by a coxswain and two crewmembers running a Rigid Hull Inflatable Fast Rescue Craft.
