= Rivière Saumon Ouest =

Location
- Country: Canada
- Province: Quebec
- Region: Outaouais
- MRC: Papineau Regional County Municipality
- Municipality: Notre-Dame-de-Bonsecours

Physical characteristics
- Source: Lake Sugar Bush
  - location: Notre-Dame-de-Bonsecours
  - coordinates: 45°47′27″N 74°47′45″W
  - elevation: 241 m (791 ft)
- Mouth: Saumon River
  - location: Notre-Dame-de-Bonsecours
  - coordinates: 45°42′37″N 74°50′35″W
  - elevation: 107 m (351 ft)
- Length: 14.3 km (8.9 mi)

Basin features
- Progression: Ottawa River, Saint Lawrence River, gulf of Saint Lawrence
- Tributaries
  - left: (upstream) discharge from a few lakes, Red Cove, discharge from a few lakes including Puant Lake, discharge from several lakes, discharge from several lakes, discharge from a few lakes, discharge from a few lakes, discharge from three lakes.
  - right: (upstream) 3 streams, discharge from three small lakes, discharge from Saddle Lake.

The Rivière Saumon Ouest (English: Salmon River West) is a tributary of the Saumon River, flowing only in the territory of the municipality of Notre-Dame-de-Bonsecours, in the Papineau Regional County Municipality, in the administrative region of Outaouais, in the province from Quebec, to Canada.

This small valley is mainly served by the Kenauk road (East–west direction), the Angèle Coast and the Azélie Coast.

Forestry (especially forestry) is the main economic activity in this valley.

== Geography ==
The West Salmon River originates from Sugar Bush Lake (length: 0.9 km (0.56 mi); altitude: 241 m (791 ft)) located in forest area.

The mouth of Sugar Bush Lake is located on the south side, at the bottom of a bay stretching over 0.25 km (0.16 mi). From the mouth of Sugar Bush Lake, the West Salmon River descends on 14.3 km (8.9 mi), with a drop of 134 km (83 mi), according to the following segments:

- 2.4 km (1.5 mi) southerly in a straight line crossing a small, very narrow lake and collecting the discharge (coming from the west) from a small lake, to a bend in the river;
- 7.6 km (4.7 mi) towards the east by collecting by collecting six streams (coming from the north), up to the Red Creek (coming from the north);
- 4.3 km (2.7 mi) first towards the south to a bend in the river, then towards the east by forming a few serpentines, to its mouth.

From the confluence of the Saumon West river and the Saumon river, the current descends on 10.9 km (6.8 mi) following the course of the Saumon river to the north bank of the Ottawa River; then on following the course of the Ottawa River, to St. Lawrence River.

== Toponymy ==
The toponym "Rivière Saumon Ouest" was formalized on November 3, 1983, at the Place Names Bank of the Commission de toponymie du Québec.

== See also ==
- Ottawa River, a stream
- List of rivers of Quebec
