= Mont Orford =

Mountain and ski resort in Quebec, Canada

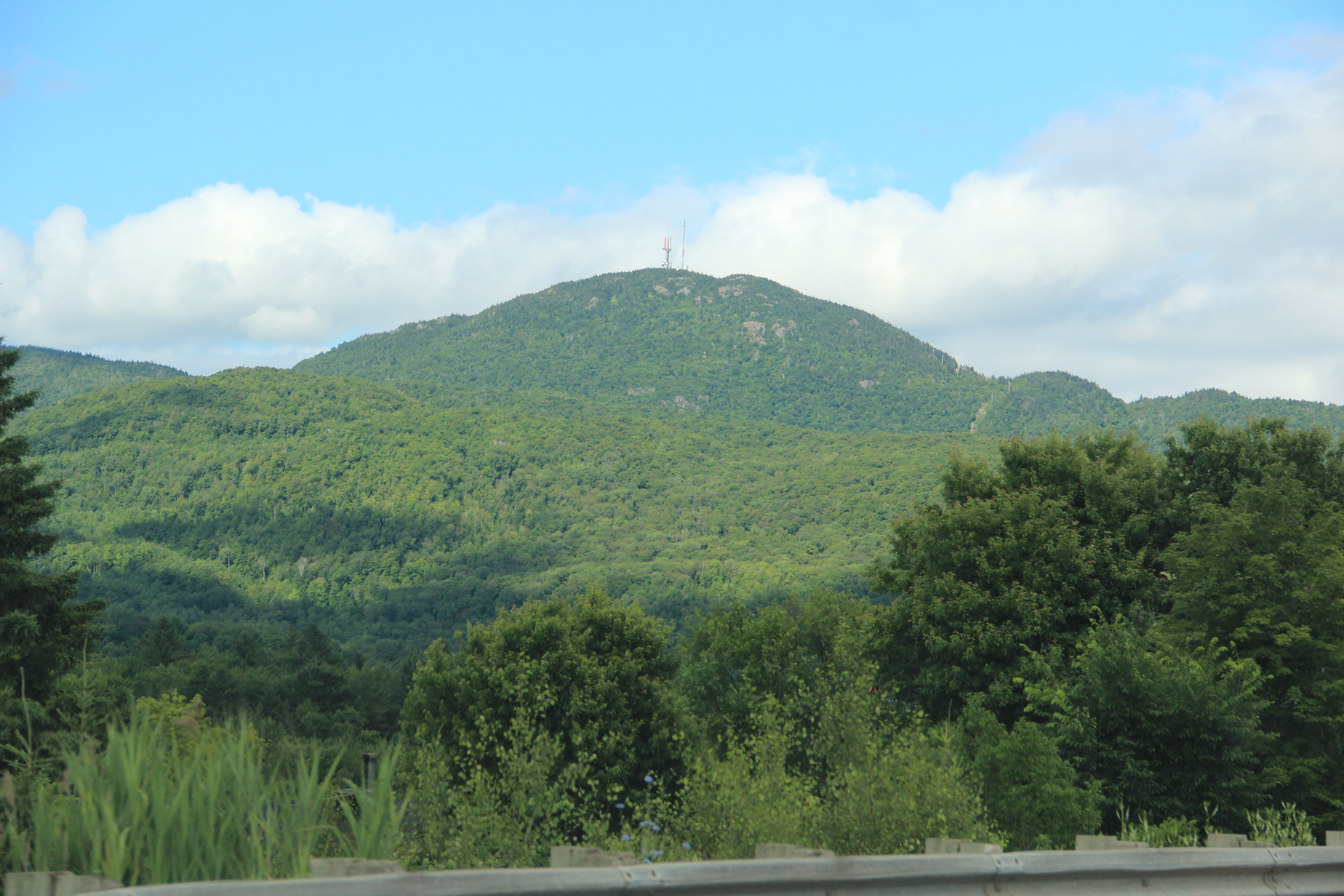
- Interactive map of Mont Orford
- Location: Orford, Quebec
- Nearest city: Magog
- Coordinates: 45°20′00″N 72°13′00″W
- Vertical: 589 m (1,932 ft)
- Top elevation: 853 m (2,799 ft)
- Base elevation: 261 m (856 ft)
- Trails: 61 Total; 33% Easy; 26% Intermediate; 41% Difficult
- Longest run: 4 km (2 mi)
- Lift system: 1 gondola, 4 chairlifts, 4 magic carpet
- Website: Official website

Mount Orford (French: Mont Orford) is a mountain and ski resort located in the Mont-Orford National Park in the Estrie region of Quebec, Canada. It is 10 km (6 mi) northwest of the centre of the city of Magog.

== History ==
Mount Orford is named after the township Orford. Its name first appears in print between 1815 and 1831.

In 2006, the provincial government and then-Environment Minister Claude Béchard announced the increase of the size of Orford as a national park. In addition, they would have sold the ski resort and golf course to private interests. Inside the 80 hectares (200 acres) that were to be sold, developers planned to build condominiums, restaurants, boutiques and a hotel. The planned development was to be similar to Mont-Tremblant but on a lesser scale, and several other projects had been planned previously. This was successfully opposed by several groups, including environmental. On May 7, 2007, new Environment Minister Line Beauchamp announced that the province would not sell Orford. Following on the heels of strong citizen support Orford Park has since been expanded several times adding over 100 square kilometers of protected area.

== Recreation ==
The ski resort consists of three summits: Mont Giroux, Mont Orford, and Mont Alfred Desrochers. It is the home mountain of Olympic medalist Nicolas Fontaine, for whom there is a track named in his honour.

Other infrastructure on the mountain currently include:

- Base lodge with bar, cafeteria, and rooftop terraces
- Groomed cruising trails as well as moguls/glades
- Ski shop, repair shop, and rental center

Former infrastructure :

- Triple yurt summit lodge
- Summit snack bar

== See also ==
- Eastern Townships
- List of protected areas of Quebec
- List of ski areas and resorts in Canada
- Lake Stukely
