= Sammon =

Sammon may refer to:

== People ==
- Sammon (surname), notable persons with the surname Sammon

== Other ==
- Jimon and Sammon, one of the factions of Tendai Buddhism
- Sammon projection, an algorithm that maps a high-dimensional space to a space of lower dimensionality
