= Salmon Creek (Skookumchuck River tributary) =

Stream in Thurston County, Washington, U.S.

Coordinates: 46°47′56″N 122°45′43″W

Salmon Creek is a stream in Thurston County in the U.S. state of Washington. It is a tributary to the Skookumchuck River.

Salmon Creek was so named on account of its stock of salmon.
