= W. S. Salmon House =

Historic building in Portland, Oregon, U.S.

- U.S. National Register of Historic Places
- Portland Historic Landmark
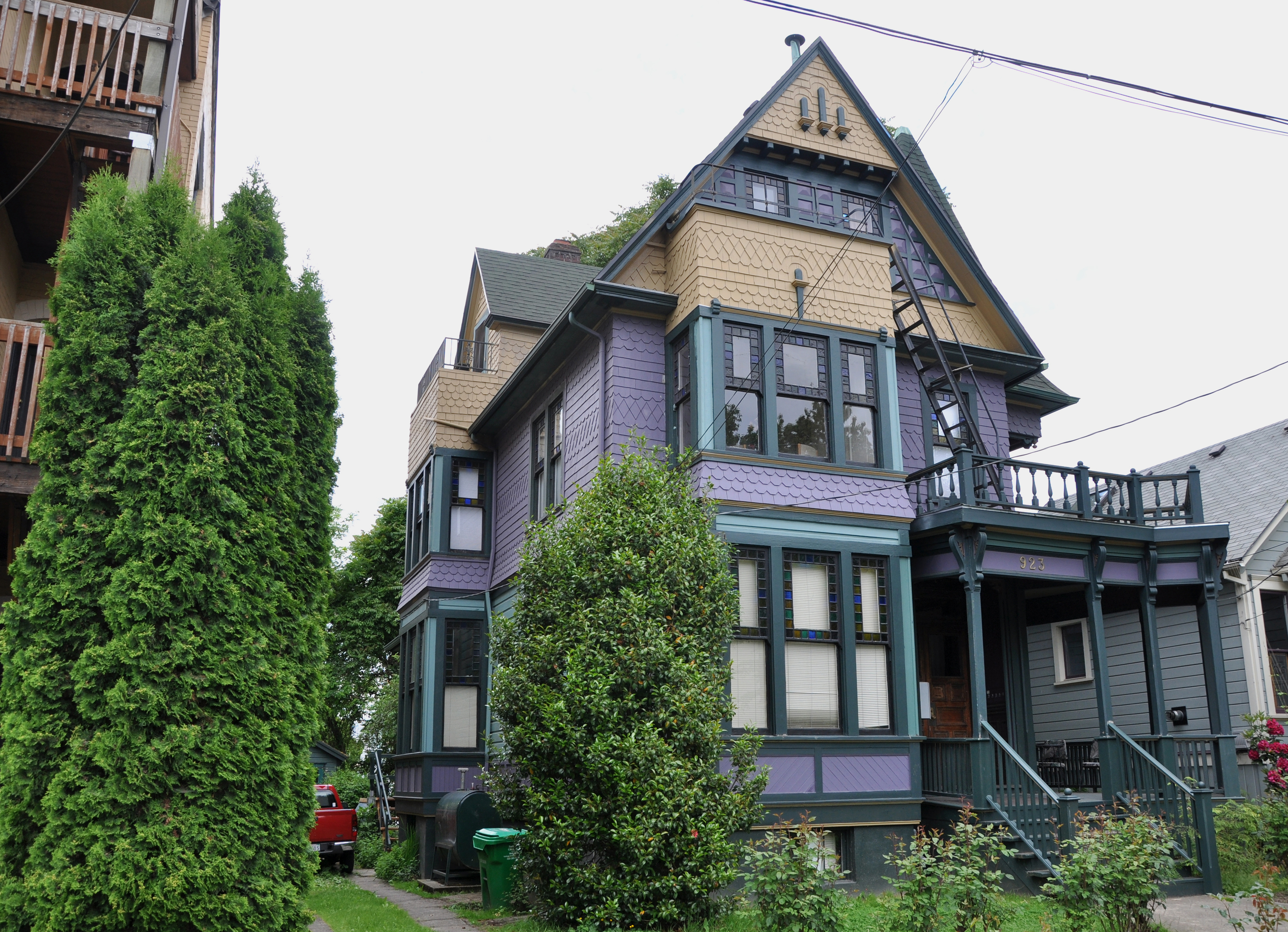
- W. S. Salmon House in 2011
- Location: 923 SE 13th Avenue; Portland, Oregon
- Coordinates: 45°30′58″N 122°39′10″W
- Area: 2,478 square feet (230.2 m^{2})
- Built: 1890
- Architectural style: Queen Anne
- NRHP reference No.: 93001496
- Added to NRHP: January 21, 1994

The W. S. Salmon House in southeast Portland in the U.S. state of Oregon, is a 2.5-story apartment house listed on the National Register of Historic Places. Built in the Queen Anne style in 1890, it was added to the register in 1994.

The 2,478-square-foot (230.2 m^{2}) structure, built as a single-family dwelling for W. S. Salmon, was originally located on the northwest corner of Southeast 13th Avenue and Morrison Street. In 1913, architect R. F. Wassell bought the house and had it moved to the west side of Southeast 13th Avenue between Belmont and Yamhill streets, about 1.5 blocks south of its original site. Although the exact date is unknown, at some point after 1900 the house was converted from a single-family dwelling into an apartment house with five units.

Significant external features include the asymmetrical shape of the building, projecting bays, a second-floor wrap-around porch, imbricated shingles, and other ornamentation. The five apartments—two on each of the first two floors and one in the attic—feature Queen Anne ornamentation, including recessed alcoves with plaster decorations, a variety of elongated sash windows, tile inserts around a large Rumford fireplace in the largest apartment, carved wooden newel posts, a dogleg staircase with an oval window above the landing, and a pressed tin ceiling in the vestibule.

Salmon was the co-owner of the Albina Sash and Door Company, and it is thought that he used the house to attract business during a late 19th-century building boom on Portland's east side. Development in the area was enhanced by completion of the Morrison Bridge over the Willamette River and the subsequent eastward extension of street car lines. One of the new lines ran along Southeast Belmont Street.

== See also ==
- National Register of Historic Places listings in Southeast Portland, Oregon
