= Orford, Quebec =

Orford
- Township municipality
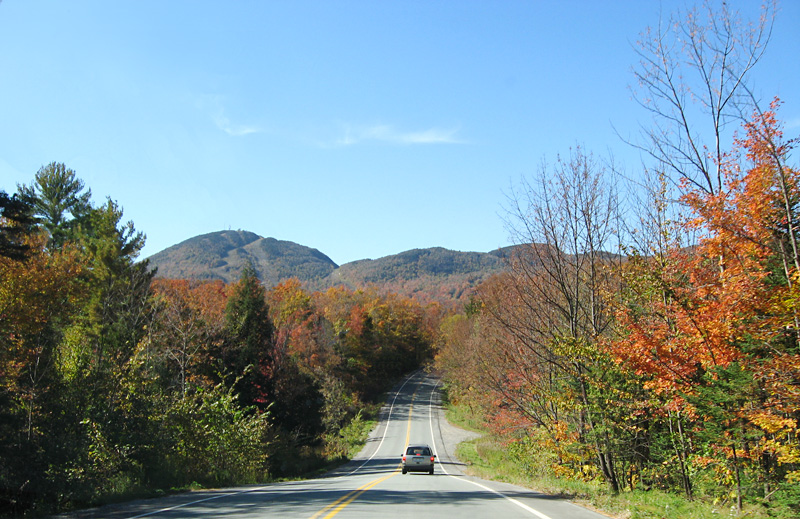

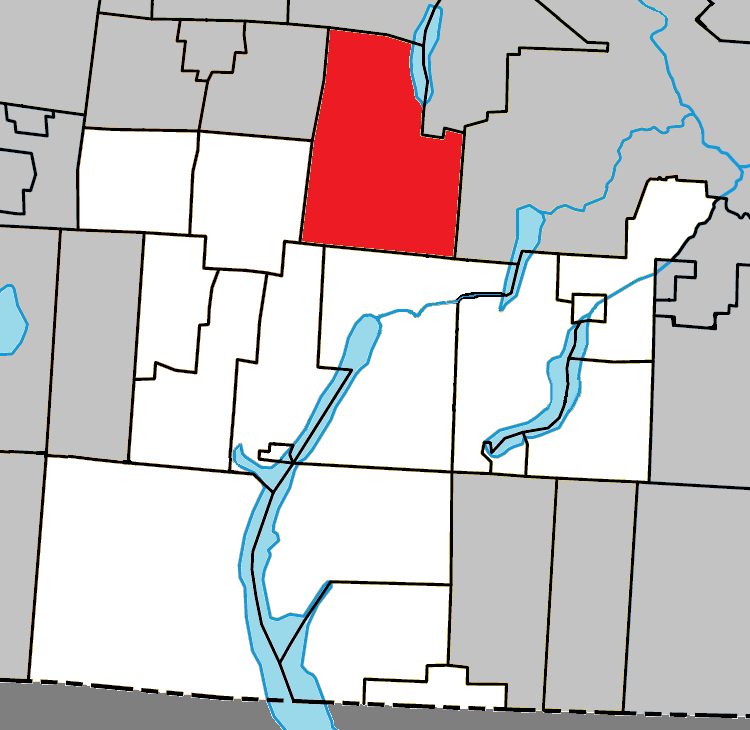
- Location within Memphrémagog RCM

- Location in southern Quebec
- Coordinates: 45.38°N 72.2°W
- Country: Canada
- Province: Quebec
- Region: Estrie
- RCM: Memphrémagog
- Constituted: July 1, 1855
- Named for: Orford, Suffolk

Government
  - Mayor: Alain Brisson
  - Federal riding: Brome—Missisquoi
  - Prov. riding: Orford

Area
  - Total: 148.60 km^{2} (57.37 sq mi)
  - Land: 136.14 km^{2} (52.56 sq mi)

Population (2021)
  - Total: 5,007
  - Density: 36.8/km^{2} (95/sq mi)
  - Pop 2016-2021: ▲15.4%
  - Dwellings: 3,099
- Time zone: UTC−5 (EST)
  - Summer (DST): UTC−4 (EDT)
- Postal code(s): J1X 8R8
- Area code: 819
- Highways: R-141; R-220
- Website: www.canton.orford.qc.ca

Orford is a township municipality of about 5,000 people in Memphrémagog Regional County Municipality in the Estrie region of Quebec, Canada.

Orford's main attraction is its ski resort on Mount Orford, attracting thousands of people every winter.

Orford is well known for the Mont-Orford National Park. The park has thousands of acres of forest and two major lakes, Stukley and Fraser. Cherry river runs through the park and ends up in Lake Memphremagog. The township has many lakes and is a tourist destination in Quebec.

== History ==
A region still little frequented at the beginning of the 19th century, the township of Orford was proclaimed in 1801 on the lands of the county of Buckinghamshire. The name refers to the village of Orford in Suffolk, England. In 1855, the municipality of the township of Orford was created. Its initial development was ensured by loyalist immigration. This founded the village of Cherry River, north of Magog. Nevertheless, the rest of the municipality remains mostly wild, until the advent of the project to create a national park.

The Huntingdon Mine was discovered in 1865 by Avary Knowlton. In 1951 it was bought by the Quebec Copper Corporation Limited, which shipped the ore to Noranda's Horne Smelter.

The Mont-Orford National Park, which was created in 1938, was allocated nearly half of the territory. Cherry River then becomes the gateway to the park. The creation of a ski resort and a golf course created a tourist craze for the region. Today, the population is divided between 40% permanent residents and 60% vacationers.

== Demographics ==
In the 2021 Census of Population conducted by Statistics Canada, Orford had a population of 5,007 living in 2,244 of its 3,099 total private dwellings, a change of 15.4% from its 2016 population of 4,337. With a land area of 136.14 km^{2} (52.56 sq mi), it had a population density of 36.8/km^{2} (95.3/sq mi) in 2021.

Canada census – Orford, Quebec community profile

	2021	2016
Population	5,007 (+15.4% from 2016)	4,337 (+21.3% from 2011)
Land area	136.14 km^{2} (52.56 sq mi)	136.19 km^{2} (52.58 sq mi)
Population density	36.8/km^{2} (95/sq mi)	31.8/km^{2} (82/sq mi)
Median age	50.4 (M: 50.4, F: 50.4)	49.1 (M: 49.7, F: 48.6)
Private dwellings	3,099 (total)	2,791 (total)
Median household income	$99,000	$80,620

References: 2021 2016

Population trend:

Census	Population	Change (%)
2021	5,007	▲15.4%
2016	4,337	▲21.3%
2011	3,575	▲20.0%
2006	2,979	▲25.0%
ADJ	2,383 (+)	▲19.9%
2001	1,987	▲39.2%
1996	1,427	▲44.9%
1991	985	N/A

ADJ = adjusted figure due to boundary change.

Mother tongue (2021)

Language	Population	Pct (%)
French only	4,650	92.9%
English only	185	3.7%
Both English and French	80	1.6%
Other languages	80	1.6%

== See also ==
- List of township municipalities in Quebec
