= Mont-Orford National Park =

National park of Quebec, Canada

- IUCN category II (national park)
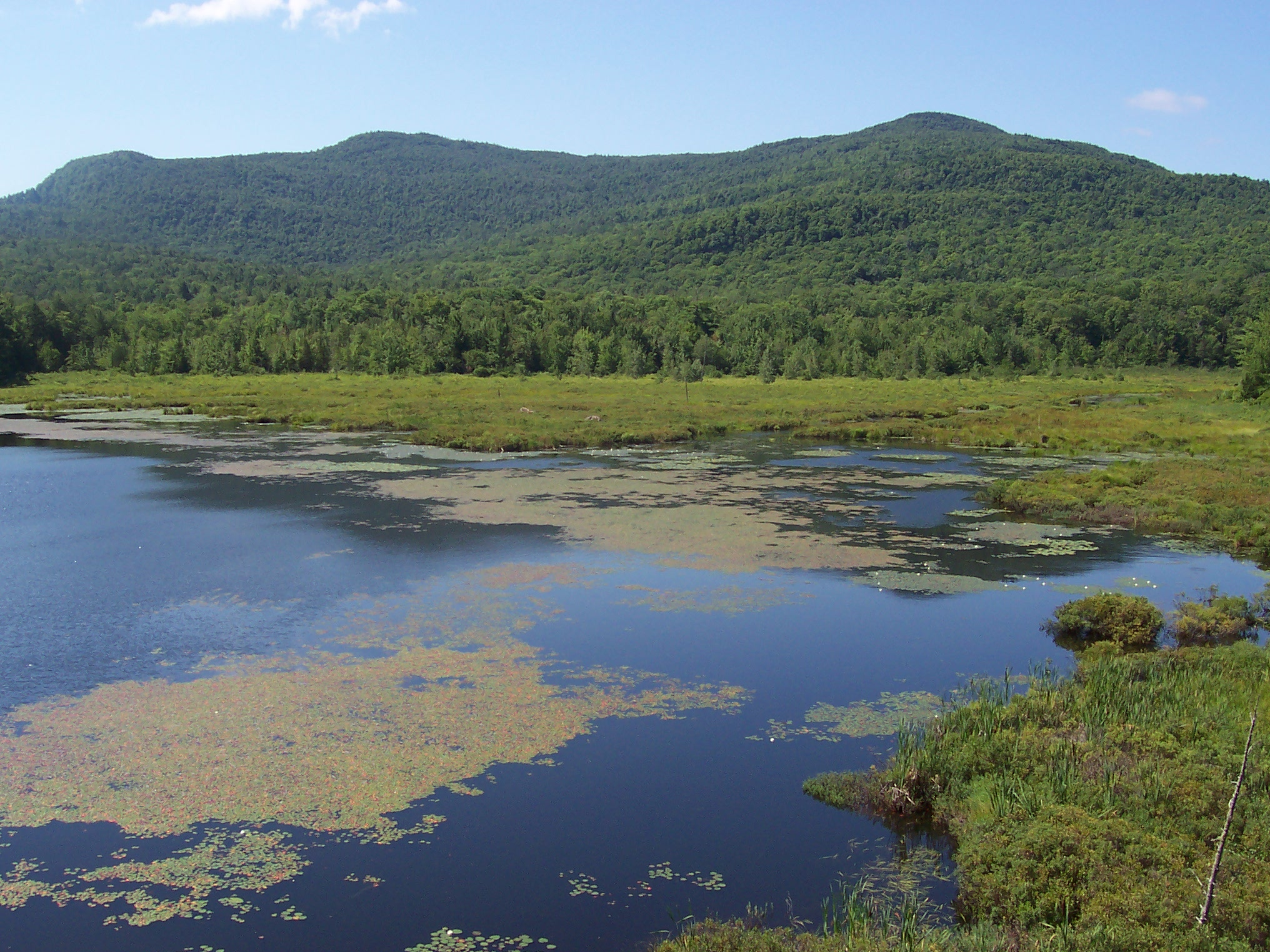

- Location within Southern Quebec
- Interactive map of Mont-Orford National Park
- Location: Orford, Memphrémagog Regional County Municipality, Quebec, Canada
- Nearest city: Magog, Quebec
- Coordinates: 45°20′00″N 72°13′00″W
- Area: 58.37 square kilometres (22.54 sq mi)
- Established: 1938

Mont-Orford National Park is a national park in Orford, Quebec, Canada that is maintained and protected by the Sépaq, a provincial body.

== Geography ==
The park is located immediately north of Magog in the Eastern Townships tourist region of the province. It encompasses several mountain peaks, among which are Mont Orford, Mont Giroux (Pic aux Corbeaux), Mont Alfred Desrochers, Mont Chauve, and the Massif des Chênes.

== Recreation ==
The park is open year-round. Popular summer activities in the park include camping, hiking, swimming, cycling, canoeing, kayaking, pedalos, row boating, rock climbing, paddle surfing, and wildlife watching. The most popular winter sport in the park is alpine skiing, with cross-country skiing, snowshoeing, snow walking, and Ski-Vel (wheelchair skiing).
