= Rivière au Saumon (Saint-Jean River tributary) =

Location
- Country: Canada
- Province: Quebec
- Region: Côte-Nord
- MRC: Minganie Regional County Municipality
- Unorganized territory: Lac-Jérôme

Physical characteristics
- Source: Unidentified lake
  - location: Lac-Jérôme
  - coordinates: 50°56′09″N 64°20′21″W
  - elevation: 490 m (1,610 ft)
- Mouth: Saint-Jean River (Minganie)
  - location: Lac-Jérôme
  - coordinates: 50°32′11″N 64°06′31″W
  - elevation: 22 m (72 ft)
- Length: 71.7 km (44.6 mi)

Basin features
- Tributaries
  - left: (upstream)
  - right: (upstream)

The rivière au Saumon (English: Salmon River) is a tributary of the Saint-Jean River, flowing in the unorganized territory of Lac-Jérôme, in the Minganie Regional County Municipality, in the administrative region of Côte-Nord, in the province of Quebec in Canada.

Forestry is the main economic activity in this valley.

== Geography ==
The salmon river draws its source at the mouth of a small lake (length: 0.4 km (0.25 mi); altitude: 490 m (1,610 ft)) in the unorganized territory of Lac-Jérôme. The mouth of this lake is located at:

- 93.3 km (58.0 mi) north-west of the village center of Havre-Saint-Pierre;
- 72.5 km (45.0 mi) north-west of the mouth of the Saint John River;
- 47 km (29 mi) north-west of the mouth of the Salmon river.

From its source, the Salmon river flows over 71.7 km (44.6 mi) with a drop of 468 m (1,535 ft), entirely in the forest zone, according to the following segments:

Upper course of the salmon river (segment of 30.6 km (19.0 mi))

- 9.4 km (5.8 mi) first south to the outlet (coming from the southwest) of two lakes; then south-east to the lake ?; then south across the lake? (length: 5.2 km (3.2 mi); altitude: 376 m (1,234 ft)), to its mouth. Note: This lake is characterized by a first peninsula attached to the east shore, stretching to the southwest on 1.1 km (0.68 mi) and a second peninsula attached to the west shore, s' stretching over 0.7 km (0.43 mi) to the east;
- 6.4 km (4.0 mi) first towards the south-east, crossing a small triangular lake at the end of the segment, to its mouth;
- 14.8 km (9.2 mi) first south-east on 7.7 km (4.8 mi) to the northwest shore of Lac Collas; then east and south across Collas Lake (length: 7.1 km (4.4 mi) matching the shape of a soup ladle with the handle on the south side; altitude: 274 m (899 ft)) over its full length to its mouth. Note: this lake receives 5 lake discharges, the largest of which comes from the south;

Lower course of the salmon river (segment of 41.1 km (25.5 mi))

- 10.2 km (6.3 mi) towards the east by forming a loop towards the north, followed by another towards the south to bypass a mountain, collecting the discharge (coming from the north) from Robin lake, crossing the lake Le Bouthiller (length: 1.7 km (1.1 mi); altitude: 249 m (817 ft)) on 2.8 km (1.7 mi), to its mouth;
- 8.9 km (5.5 mi) first towards the east to a bend in the river corresponding to the outlet (coming from the east) of several lakes; then south, crossing Renfrew Lake (length: 3.6 km (2.2 mi); altitude: 223 m (732 ft)) on 2.8 km (1.7 mi), to its mouth. Note: Renfrew Lake is characterized by a large rectangular peninsula attached to the west shore, stretching for 1.1 km (0.68 mi) to the east; which gives the lake the shape of a question mark backwards;
- 16.8 km (10.4 mi) towards the south-east by collecting the discharge (coming from the north) of Lake Esnault and the discharge (coming from the southwest) of a set of lakes, up to the discharge (from the northwest) of Lac Douayren;
- 5.2 km (3.2 mi) towards the east in a deep valley, forming a loop towards the north, then curving towards the south-east, until its mouth.

The Salmon River flows on the west bank of the Saint-Jean River, about halfway between the southern limit of Labrador and the north shore of the Gulf of Saint Lawrence. This confluence is located at:

- 27.9 km (17.3 mi) north-west of the village center of Mingan;
- 32.5 km (20.2 mi) north of the mouth of the Saint-Jean river (i.e. near the village of Rivière-Saint-Jean);
- 13 km (8.1 mi) west of Manitou Lake which is part of the hydrographic side of the Mingan River.

From the mouth of the Salmon river, the current descends the course of the Saint-Jean River towards the southwest on 43.4 km (27.0 mi) , to the north shore of Gulf of Saint Lawrence.

== Toponymy ==
The toponym "rivière au Saumon" was formalized on December 5, 1968, at the Place Names Bank of the Commission de toponymie du Québec.

== See also ==
- List of rivers of Quebec
