= Shalmaneser =

Shalmaneser (Salmānu-ašarēd) was the name of five kings of Assyria:

- Shalmaneser I (r. c. 1274–1245 BC)
- Shalmaneser II (r. 1030–1019 BC)
- Shalmaneser III (r. 859–824 BC)
- Shalmaneser IV (r. 783–773 BC)
- Shalmaneser V (r. 727–722 BC), who appears in the Bible as the conqueror of the Kingdom of Israel

It may also refer to:

- Shalmaneser, an artificial intelligence in John Brunner's 1968 novel Stand on Zanzibar
- Salmanazar, a wine bottle size measuring 9 litres
- George Psalmanazar (c. 1679–1763), a Frenchman who posed as a Formosan immigrant
