= Rivière à Saumon =

Location
- Country: Canada
- Province: Quebec
- Region: Côte-Nord
- MRC: Le Golfe-du-Saint-Laurent Regional County Municipality
- Municipality: Petit-Mécatina

Physical characteristics
- Source: Unidentified Lake
  - location: Petit-Mécatina
  - coordinates: 51°49′17″N 59°18′02″W
  - elevation: 408 m (1,339 ft)
- Mouth: Wapustagamau Lake
  - location: Petit-Mécatina
  - coordinates: 51°31′21″N 59°06′27″W
  - elevation: 119 m (390 ft)
- Length: 51.1 km (31.8 mi)

Basin features
- Progression: Wapustagamau Lake, rivière Saint-Augustin Nord-Ouest, Saint-Augustin River, Saint-Augustin Bay, gulf of Saint Lawrence

The rivière à Saumon (English: Salmon River) is a tributary of Wapustagamau Lake, flowing in the unorganized territory of Petit-Mécatina, in the Le Golfe-du-Saint-Laurent Regional County Municipality, in the administrative region of Côte-Nord, in the province of Quebec, in Canada.

== Geography ==
The Salmon River generally flows southeast between the rivière Saint-Augustin Nord-Ouest and the Saint-Augustin River. The Salmon River originates at the mouth of an unidentified lake (length: 2.9 km (1.8 mi); altitude: 408 m (1,339 ft)) in the unorganized territory of Petit-Mécatina. This long, misshapen lake is mainly fed by four small lake outlets. This source is located at:

- 157 km (98 mi) south-west of the village center of Blanc-Sablon;
- 76.2 km (47.3 mi) north-west of the mouth of the rivière Saint-Augustin Nord-Ouest;
- 36.0 km (22.4 mi) north-west of the mouth of the Rivière aux Saumons.

From its source, the salmon river flows over 51.1 km (31.8 mi) with a drop of 289 m (948 ft), entirely in the forest zone, according to the following segments:

Upper course of the salmon river (segment of 28.1 km (17.5 mi))

- 3.5 km (2.2 mi) to the north, especially when crossing the lake ? (length: 3.2 km (2.0 mi); altitude: 399 m (1,309 ft)) first north, then east, to its mouth;
- 7.9 km (4.9 mi) to the east, in particular by crossing three lakes: the lake? (length: 1.6 km (0.99 mi); altitude: 399 m (1,309 ft)); Lake ? (length: 1.6 km (0.99 mi); altitude: 382 m (1,253 ft)); Lake ? (length: 1.0 km (0.62 mi); altitude: 342 m (1,122 ft)), to its mouth.
- 7.8 km (4.8 mi) towards the south-east by crossing two small lakes; then crossing 1.0 km (0.62 mi) to the south towards the lake? (length: 2.0 km (1.2 mi); altitude: 328 m (1,076 ft)), to its mouth. Note: This last lake looks like a big man's head looking west;
- 8.9 km (5.5 mi) first towards the south-east to the north shore of the lake ?; then east, crossing the lake ? on 3.6 km (2.2 mi) (length: 4.1 km (2.5 mi); altitude: 311 m (1,020 ft)), to its mouth. Note: this lake receives on the southwest side the discharge of ten lakes;

Lower course of the salmon river (segment of 23.0 km (14.3 mi))

- 3.6 km (2.2 mi) towards the east by forming a curve towards the north to go around mountains, until the mouth of a lake (coming from the southeast), that the current crosses a hundred meters;
- 10.3 km (6.4 mi) towards the south-east in a deep valley, crossing the lake? (length: 3.9 km (2.4 mi) triangular in shape with a bay to the northwest; altitude: 197 m (646 ft)), to its mouth;
- 5.3 km (3.3 mi) to the south, crossing the lake? (length: 2.5 km (1.6 mi); altitude: 170 m (560 ft)), to its mouth. Note: This lake receives the discharge (coming from the west) from a set of lakes and the discharge (coming from the east) from a set of lakes;
- 3.8 km (2.4 mi) to the south, in particular by crossing the lake in mid-segment? (length: 0.9 km (0.56 mi) in rectangular form; altitude: 165 m (541 ft)) over its full length, up to its mouth. Note: The lake? receives the discharge (coming from the west) of three lakes.

The Salmon River flows on the north shore of Wapustagamau Lake, about halfway between the southern limit of Labrador and the north shore of the Gulf of St. Lawrence. This confluence is located at:

- 137 km (85 mi) south-west of the village center of Blanc-Sablon;
- 42 km (26 mi) north-west of the mouth of the Saint-Augustin North-West river (near the village of Saint-Augustin);
- 56 km (35 mi) north-west of the north shore of the Gulf of St. Lawrence.

From the mouth of the Salmon river, the current crosses Wapustagamau Lake west on 3.5 km (2.2 mi), then descends the course of the outlet of Wapustagamau lake on 10.2 km (6.3 mi), the course of the rivière Saint-Augustin Nord-Ouest east on 61.1 km (38.0 mi), the course of the Saint-Augustin River southeasterly on 5.4 km (3.4 mi), cross Baie Saint-Augustin east on 19.6 km (12.2 mi), as far as the north shore of Gulf of St. Lawrence.

== Toponymy ==
The toponym "Rivière à Saumon" was formalized on December 5, 1968, at the Place Names Bank of the Commission de toponymie du Québec.

== See also ==
- List of rivers of Quebec
