= Sayward Valley =

Coordinates: 50.366°N 125.926°W

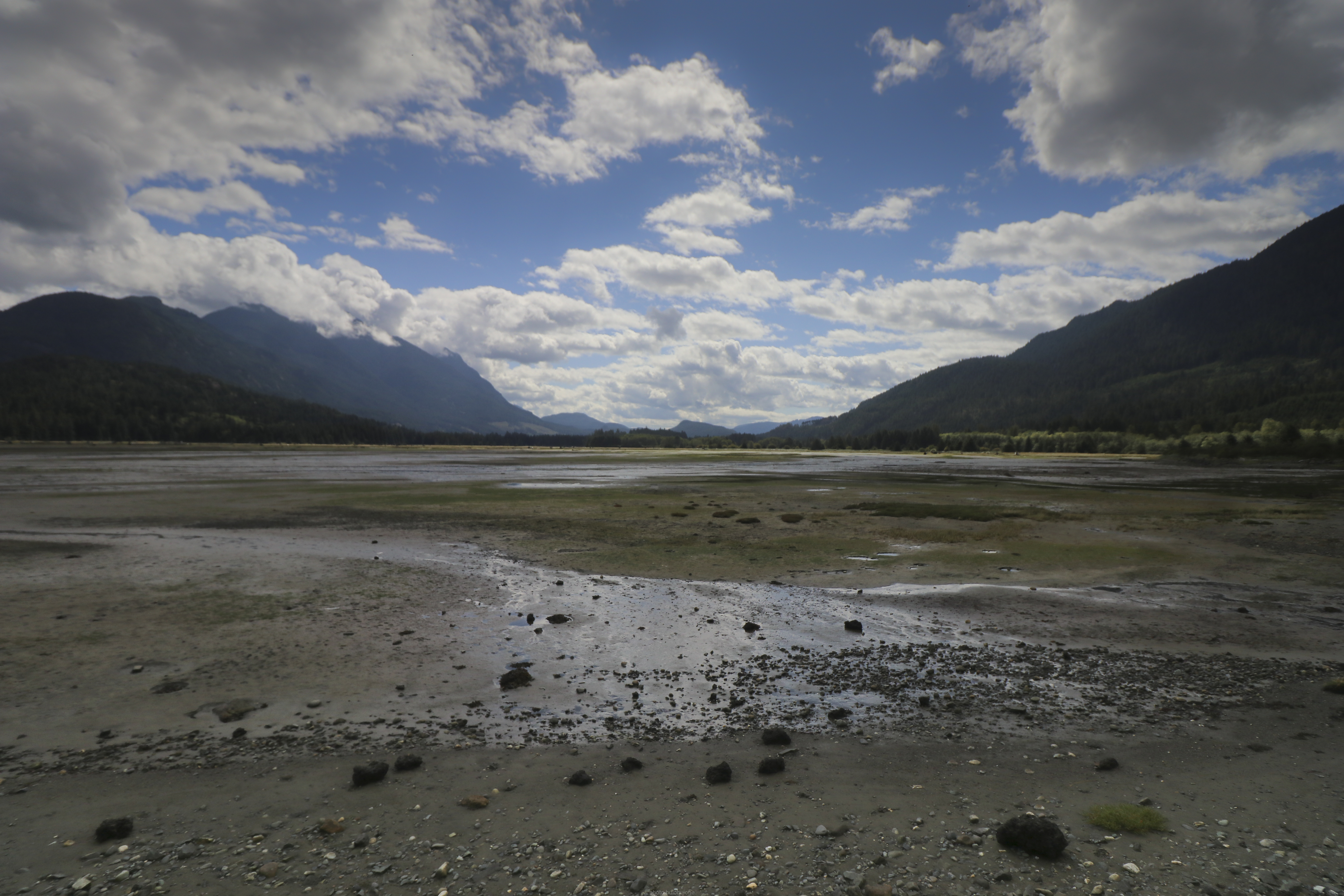
Sayward Valley

Sayward Valley is a low-lying area in northeastern Vancouver Island. It is occupied by a floodplain of the Salmon River. The soils there have variable drainage and are mostly of loam texture. Upland soils in the valley have clay loam to gravelly loamy sand texture and show podzol profile development in most cases.

Forest vegetation is dominated by large Douglas fir, western hemlock and western red cedar. Other large trees include grand fir (at its northern limit), Sitka spruce, western white pine, black cottonwood, red alder and bigleaf maple.
