= Salmon Branch =

Stream in Hickman and Perry County, Tennessee, U.S.

Coordinates: 35.6934012°N 87.7366893°W

Salmon Branch is a stream in Hickman and Perry counties, Tennessee, in the United States. It is a tributary to Cane Creek.

Salmon Branch was named for a pioneer named Salmon who settled on the creek in about 1820.

== See also ==
- List of rivers of Tennessee
