= Saumon River =

Rivière Saumon

Location
- Country: Canada
- Province: Quebec
- Region: Outaouais
- MRC: Papineau Regional County Municipality
- Municipality: Notre-Dame-de-Bonsecours

Physical characteristics
- Source: Lake Papineau
  - location: Notre-Dame-de-Bonsecours
  - coordinates: 45°47′12″N 74°47′45″W
  - elevation: 171 m (561 ft)
- Mouth: Ottawa River
  - location: Notre-Dame-de-Bonsecours
  - coordinates: 45°38′49″N 74°54′50″W
  - elevation: 36 m (118 ft)
- Length: 22.4 km (13.9 mi)

Basin features
- Progression: Ottawa River→ St. Lawrence River→ Gulf of St. Lawrence
- River system: Ottawa River drainage basin
- Tributaries
  - left: (upstream) agricultural stream, mountain stream, discharge of a set of lakes, mountain stream, discharge from Maholey Lake, discharge from Collins Lake, Bent Creek.
  - right: (upstream) Pesant creek, discharge from Lac Écho, discharge from Lac Presseau, discharge from a set of lakes, West Saumon river, discharge from Lake Balsam, discharge from Lac du Cèdre, stream (via Lac Poisson Blanc), stream (via Lac Poisson Blanc), discharge of three small lakes.

The rivière Saumon (English: Salmon River) is a watercourse flowing southwest by crossing only the territory of the municipality of Notre-Dame-de-Bonsecours, in the Papineau Regional County Municipality, in the administrative region of Outaouais, in Quebec, in Canada.

Recreational and tourist activities are the main economic activity in this valley; forestry, second; and agriculture at the bottom.

== Geography ==
The neighboring watersheds of the Salmon River are:

- North Coast :
- east side: the Little Salmon River;
- west side: Hébert cove, West Saumon River, Red cove;
- north side: Lake Papineau.

The Saumon River descends in a narrow valley, bordered by cliffs, in forest and mountainous territory, except by crossing the strip of land bordering the Ottawa River.

The mouth of Papineau Lake is on the south side of a bay 1.0 km (0.62 mi) long. From the mouth of Papineau Lake, the Saumon River descends on 22.4 km (13.9 mi), with a drop of 135 m (443 ft), according to the following segments:

- 3.7 km (2.3 mi) towards the southwest by crossing a marsh zone towards the end of this segment, until the outlet of Lake Falls coming from the northeast;
- 1.3 km (0.81 mi) to the southwest by collecting the waters of Bent stream, then crossing a marsh zone, to the west shore of Lac du Poisson Blanc;
- 1.6 km (0.99 mi) south to a small lake which receives from the west the outlet from Lac du Cèdre;
- 1.0 km (0.62 mi) south-east to the outlet of a set of lakes, in particular: Maholey, Craig, lac à Jimmy, Double, Cameron, at the Perchaude and Schryer;
- 2.8 km (1.7 mi) to the west, then the southwest, crossing the Rapide Black, to the outlet of Balsam Lake coming from the northwest;
- 1.1 km (0.68 mi) south to the outlet of the West Saumon river from the west;
- 4.8 km (3.0 mi) towards the south-west flowing in a narrow valley between mountain cliffs, collecting the waters of the outlet of Lac Presseau, to the outlet of Lac Écho coming from the west;
- 4.4 km (2.7 mi) south-west to Crique à Pesant coming from the west;
- 1.7 km (1.1 mi) west to the mouth that flows into the Ottawa River 1.5 km (0.93 mi) east of the town hall of Montebello. The Salmon River flows into the Ottawa River between the bay at Huneault and the bay at Laurier-Laroche, upstream from the flats at Kemp. The mouth of the Saumon River is located almost opposite the hamlet Lefaivre, located in Ontario.

From the confluence between the Saumon River and the Ottawa River, the current descends on following the course of the Ottawa River, up to St. Lawrence River.

== Toponymy ==
Formerly, this watercourse was designated the Kinonge River, a hydronym of Amerindian origin of the Algonquin nation meaning 'pike'. The toponym Kinonge River is indicated on the map of the seigniory of La Petite-Nation, dated 1854 or 1855, in the form of the River Kinonge or Saumon and also on the map of the seigniory of La Petite-Nation of 1887, in the form of Salmon River or Kinongé.

The toponym Rivière Saumon was formalized on November 3, 1983, at the Place Names Bank of the Commission de toponymie du Québec.

== See also ==
- List of rivers of Quebec
