= Frank v Canada (AG) =

- Supreme Court of Canada

Hearing: 21 March 2018 Judgment: 10 January 2019
- Full case name: Gillian Frank and Jamie Duong v Attorney General of Canada
- Citations: [2019] 1 S.C.R. 3
- Docket No.: 36645
- Ruling: Appeal allowed

Holding
- Sections 222(1) (b) and (c), 223(1) (f) and 226 (f) of the Canada Elections Act are declared to be of no force or effect; the words "a person who has been absent from Canada for less than five consecutive years and who intends to return to Canada as a resident" are struck from s. 11(d) of the Act and are replaced with the words "an elector who resides outside Canada"; and the word "temporarily" is struck from ss. 220, 222(1) and 223(1)(e) of the Act.

Court membership
- Chief Justice: Richard Wagner; Puisne Justices: Rosalie Abella, Michael Moldaver, Andromache Karakatsanis, Clément Gascon, Suzanne Côté, Russell Brown, Malcolm Rowe, Sheilah Martin

Reasons given
- Majority: Wagner C.J., joined by Moldaver, Karakatsanis, Gascon, JJ.
- Concurrence: Rowe J.
- Dissent: Côté and Brown JJ.
- Abela and Martin JJ. took no part in the consideration or decision of the case.

Frank v Canada (AG) 2019 SCC 1 is a case decided by the Supreme Court of Canada regarding the voting rights of expatriate Canadians. The majority in the 5–2 decision struck down a passage in the Canada Elections Act which had limited the right to vote to "a person who has been absent from Canada for less than five consecutive years and who intends to return to Canada as a resident".

== Background ==
Section 3 of the Canadian Charter of Rights and Freedoms (1982) states:

"Every citizen of Canada has the right to vote in an election of members of the House of Commons or of a legislative assembly and to be qualified for membership therein.

This is subject to Section 1, which states:

The Canadian Charter of Rights and Freedoms guarantees the rights and freedoms set out in it subject only to such reasonable limits prescribed by law as can be demonstrably justified in a free and democratic society.

In May 1993, the government of Brian Mulroney amended the Canada Elections Act so that Canadians living abroad could vote in federal elections under the condition that they were:

... a person who has been absent from Canada for less than five consecutive years and who intends to return to Canada as a resident ...

Those who returned to visit Canada within the five-year limit had this time reset, so that those who frequently returned to visit Canada maintained the right to vote from abroad. After Stephen Harper's government came to power in 2006, it began strictly enforcing the five-year limit, so that it never reset for those who visited Canada.

The provisions in the act were challenged by Canadian citizens Gillian Frank and Jamie Duong. Both worked at universities in the United States, as they could not find suitable work in Canada. When they found they could not vote in the 2011 Canadian federal election, they pursued a case.

The Justin Trudeau government introduced the Elections Modernization Act shortly before the Supreme Court's decision; the legislation restored expatriate voting rights, but left open whether future governments could take them away again.

== See also ==
- International Register of Electors
