= Section 329 of the Canada Elections Act =

Canadian election law

Section 329 of the Canada Elections Act was designed to prevent the transmission of any election results until polls were closed nationwide. Section 329 stated that:

"No person shall transmit the result or purported result of the vote in an electoral district to the public in another electoral district before the close of all of the polling stations in that other electoral district."

But on January 13, 2012, the Canadian government said it planned to repeal Section 329 of the Canada Elections Act due to technological changes and the inability to enforce it. It was just another step in the changing dynamic of journalism, technology, and the democratic process.

Section 329 was repealed on June 19, 2014, as part of the Fair Elections Act.

== History ==
The idea of an election in which no one knew the results until voting was over was not present in the 19th century. In 1855, in every province but New Brunswick, voters cast their ballots orally. This led to a system where information on who voted for who could be used for nefarious reasons. Intimidation and blackmail to force people to vote in a certain way.

But another election practice in this time period would not work in later times. This was the practice of holding elections on different dates in different ridings. In this system, knowing or guessing the results of one riding impacted the way the political parties and people acted in the others.

"The system allowed the party in power to hold elections in a safe riding first, hoping in this way to influence the vote in constituencies less favourable to them. The system even enabled a candidate who lost in one riding to run again in another." In some cases this was drawn out to extremes: the 1872 election was stretched out more than two months by the Conservatives.

There was no real effect to the democratic process because of these long, drawn out elections because communication between ridings and provinces was very slow. It wasn't until the railroad and the telegraph that technology could interfere. In 1938, a ban was put in place to stop the transmission of results from one area to another before polls were closed.

At the end of the 20th century, the ban started to feel obsolete in the face of technology, but bigger issues came to the surface. Proponents of the ban stated the need to make sure each poll had the same information when they are voting. Opponents of the ban stated freedom of speech as a right that the ban infringed upon.

The ban's main purpose was to compensate for the time gap between Eastern and Western Canada. Before 1996, there was a four-hour difference between closing polls in St. John's and Vancouver. But in 1996 the government imposed another policy to help this gap. They introduced staggered voting hours. "Under staggered voting hours, only results from less than ten percent of ridings could be available to late voters since the majority of polls across Canada open and close at the same time. Despite this, the prohibition on the transmission of election results remains in place."

In theory, staggered voting hours has helped the problem of information from other ridings getting out, due to most of the country voting around the same time. "10 per cent of the country finishes voting with 2.5 hours remaining in B.C., and 88 per cent of votes are in with only 30 minutes left in B.C. voting. Then the votes have to be counted."

Dave Teixera suggests that "there is no way to mobilize the numbers required to "strategically" vote (meaning vote in a way you may not traditionally vote in order to topple the sitting government) based on Eastern results with 30 minutes remaining in B.C. voting...sharing the known voting results via social media will have zero motivating effect on voters in B.C. There is simply no time, nor any desire to change one's vote due to the outcome in another part of the country."

== Controversy ==
Most of the dissent regarding the ban comes from Western Canada. That is where the biggest challenge to Section 329 occurred during the 2000 federal election.

British Columbia resident Paul Bryan posted election results in Atlantic Canada before the polls closed in B.C. He posted the results on his website to deliberately protest against Section 329. The fine for breaking Section 329 was determined to be $25,000 or less.

According to Bryan, modern communications made the ban obsolete. When the British Columbia provincial court charged him, Bryan argued that his actions were protected in the Canadian Charter of Rights and Freedoms. Bryan cited two sections of the charter in his defense. Bryan said the charter guaranteed him free expression and free political association and that allowed him to circumvent Section 329.

During the legal proceedings, Bryan had cross-country support. He had the support of the Canadian Civil Liberties Association, the National Citizens Coalition, and the CBC. Bryan even had the support of Stephen Harper.

But the B.C provincial court did not agree with Bryan. He was convicted and fined $1,000. In 2003, the British Columbia Supreme Court overturned the ruling. This effectively made Section 329 moot in British Columbia. This had a major impact on the 2004 Federal election in B.C. It allowed the media to inform B.C voters results of the election in Eastern Canada before polls closed in British Columbia. There was no great difference between this election and past ones in terms of the fears of the proponents of Section 329.

Once again in 2005, the B.C court of Appeal reversed the provincial's court decision, citing the need of fairness and ensuring all voters receive equality on election day.

After the British Columbia court of appeal, Bryan took his case to the Supreme Court of Canada. It was there that the short term fate of Section 329 was decided. On March 15, 2007, the Supreme Court upheld the ban by a vote of 5–4. The key to the Supreme court's decision was what they called, "informational equality for all voters." In the Supreme Court's view, Section 329 "contributes in a positive way to the fairness and reputation of the electoral system."

== Tweet the Results ==
The largest mass scale protest to Section 329 came in the 2011 federal election. In this election many people took to Twitter to disobey the law. Twitter users used proxy names for parties (from fruit and soft drinks) and created fake accounts to get away with sharing the illegal information.

One Twitter account in particular was key. The account, Tweettheresults, has been for some time a proponent of changing Section 329. They went offline during the 2011 election, to avoid fines or legal battles. But they encouraged others to use the #tweettheresults hashtag to share the information.

Other Twitter users were content with using the occasion for humour. One account sent out the following tweet, full with self-imposed censorship: "Conservatives ███ █████ in ███ ridings," the tweet said. "Liberals ███ █████. NDP █████ ██ ███ ███ seats!"

During election night, the #tweettheresults hashtags topped Twitter's list of trending topics.

== Repeal ==
On January 13, 2012, the federal government announced it "would end the ban on posting early election results before polls closed across the country."

The plans were announced on Twitter by Tim Uppal, minister for democratic reform. At a later press conference, Uppal said, "This ban, which was enacted in 1938, is out of place and unenforceable."

Elections Canada found the ban impossible to enforce because of social media and the internet. They gave up "monitoring premature release of data." The plan is not just supported by the Conservatives, "Repealing the ban is consistent with recommendations by the Chief Electoral Officer, who highlighted the difficulties associated with enforcing the ban in his report following the 41st general election."

== Journalism ==
There were cases of news outlets breaking Section 329. Due to a feed switching error at the network's master control on the night of the 2011 election, CBC Television's live broadcast to the Atlantic Provinces, where the polls had already closed, began broadcasting to the rest of the country in lieu of the prerecorded lead-in special that was supposed to air at that time. After about ten minutes, the broadcast was taken off the air. In its place was a "Sorry, we're experiencing technical difficulties" message. Once the polls closed in each region, CBC continued their coverage normally.

After the incident Election Canada said they would enforce Section 329 based on complaints. CBC was never charged with breaking Section 329.
