= Sauvé v Canada (Chief Electoral Officer) =

- Supreme Court of Canada

Hearing: December 10, 2001 Judgment: October 31, 2002
- Full case name: Richard Sauvé v The Attorney General of Canada, the Chief Electoral Officer of Canada and the Solicitor General of Canada; Sheldon McCorrister, Chairman, Lloyd Knezacek, Vice Chairman, on their own behalf and on behalf of the Stony Mountain Institution Inmate Welfare Committee, and Clair Woodhouse, Chairman, Aaron Spence, Vice Chairman, and Serge Bélanger, Emile A. Bear and Randy Opoonechaw v The Attorney General of Canada
- Citations: [2002] 3 SCR 519; 2002 SCC 68
- Prior history: Appeal from the Federal Court of Appeal

Court membership
- Chief Justice: Beverley McLachlin; Puisne Justices: Claire L'Heureux-Dubé, Charles Gonthier, Frank Iacobucci, John C. Major, Michel Bastarache, Ian Binnie, Louise Arbour, Louis LeBel

Reasons given
- Majority: McLachlin CJ (paras 1–64), joined by Iacobucci, Binnie, Arbour, and LeBel JJ
- Dissent: Gonthier (paras 65–208), joined by L'Heureux‑Dubé, Major and Bastarache JJ

Sauvé v Canada (Chief Electoral Officer), [2002] 3 S.C.R. 519, 2002 SCC 68 is a leading Supreme Court of Canada decision where the Court held that prisoners have a right to vote under section 3 of the Canadian Charter of Rights and Freedoms. The Court overturned the prior decision of the Federal Court of Appeal and held that section 51(e) of the old Canada Elections Act, which prohibited prisoners serving a sentence of over two years from voting, was unconstitutional. Section 51(e) had been repealed before the date of the Court's judgment, but the decision applied equally to section 4(c) of the new statute, which was substantially the same. The Court ruled that the provision violated section 3 of the Charter and was not a reasonable limit under section 1.

As a result of the decision, all adult citizens living in Canada are now able to vote, save the top two officials of Elections Canada. Relevant sections of the Canada Elections Act was amended in 2018 as part of the Elections Modernization Act.

== See also ==
- List of Supreme Court of Canada cases (McLachlin Court)
- Richardson v. Ramirez, 418 U.S. 24 (1974) - similar US case
- British Columbia Civil Liberties Association
