= Non-resident citizen voting =

Non-resident citizen voting is citizens voting in elections according to their citizenship while not residing in the country of the election. As of 2020 a total of 141 countries grant non-residents such as emigrants or expatriates the right to non-resident citizen voting. There is considerable variation across countries in regard to voter eligibility, voting modalities, i.e. voting in person at diplomatic missions or other physical locations, by post or online, which elections nonresident citizens may vote in, i.e. elections of the national legislature, executive elections, referendums, or sub-national elections, and how nonresident citizen voters are represented. The number of countries enfranchising nonresident citizens accelerated significantly in the 1990s. Social scientists have advanced a number of claims about the causes and consequences of this development and debated its normative implications or pros and cons of nonresident citizen voting.

== Variations ==
Some countries (such as France) grant their expatriate citizens unlimited voting rights, identical to those of citizens living in their home country. Other countries allow expatriate citizens to vote only for a certain number of years after leaving the country, after which they are no longer eligible to vote (e.g. 25 years for Germany, except if you can show that you are still affected by the political decisions in Germany). Other countries reserve the right vote solely to citizens living in that country, thereby stripping expatriate citizens of their voting rights once they leave their home country (such as Ireland, with extremely limited exceptions).

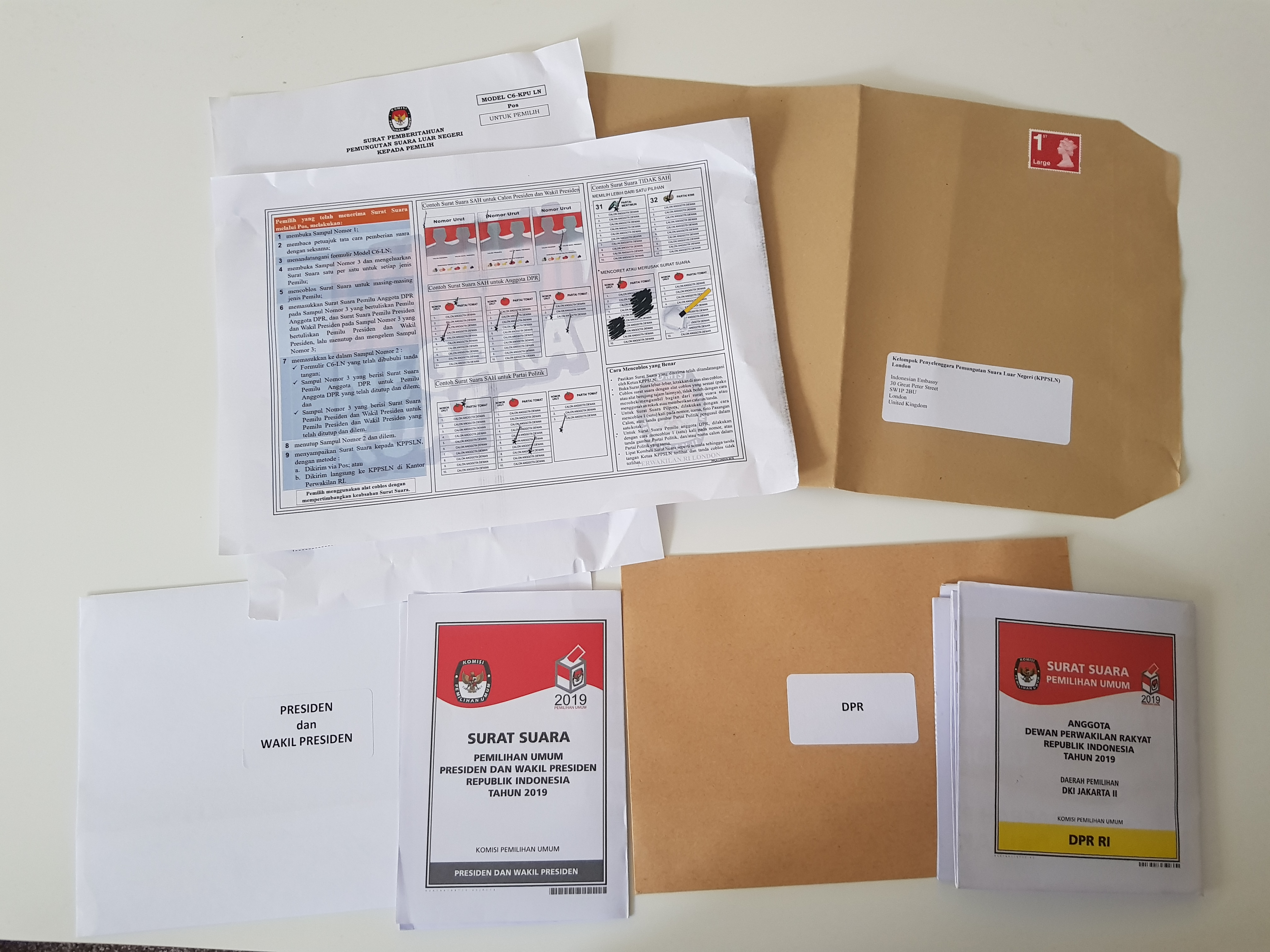
Postal voting package sent to an Indonesian voter in the United Kingdom for the 2019 Indonesian general election

There is similar variation in how non-resident citizens can exercise their right to vote. Most commonly, non-resident voters have to cast their ballots at an embassy or consulate of their country. Some countries are even more restrictive, such as East Timor which "limited in-person voting to only its Australian and Portuguese missions in 2017." At the less restrictive end of the spectrum non-resident New Zealand voters may download their ballots and upload their completed ballots to the Electoral Commission's website or mail in or fax their ballots to the New Zealand Electoral Commission or a New Zealand diplomatic mission.

French non-resident citizen voters may cast ballots in elections for the European Parliament, French presidential elections, national referendums as well as elections to the National Assembly, the lower house of parliament, and elections for members of the Assembly of French Citizens Resident Abroad who in turn elect 12 members of the French Senate. New Zealand non-resident citizen voters may cast their ballots in national as well as local elections. In Colombia non-resident citizens may vote in presidential and legislative elections, but they are excluded from regional and local elections.

Finally, some countries assimilate non-resident voters into existing constituencies for resident citizens whereas others have reserved special seats in their legislatures for non-resident citizen voters. The United States is an example of the first alternative. United States citizens who live abroad may vote in the state where they have established voting residence, and their votes will count toward election results in that state. Italy, on the other hand, established special seats in the Italian Senate and the Chamber of Deputies to represent non-resident citizens.

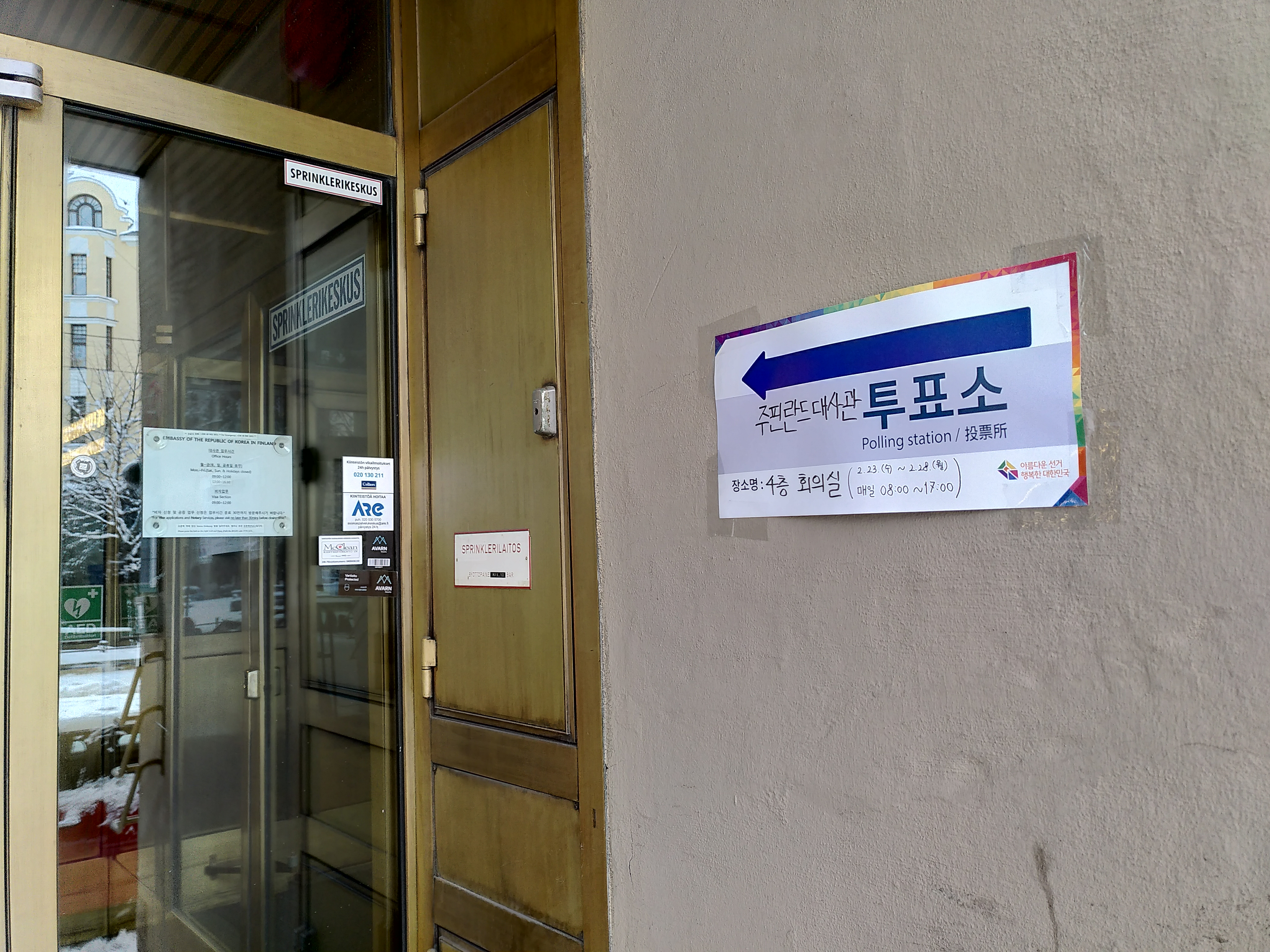
A polling station at the Embassy of the Republic of Korea in Helsinki

== Historical development ==
According to a pioneering study by the International Institute for Democracy and Electoral Assistance, the first case of external voting took place in the United States in the state of Wisconsin in 1862 when the state allowed absentee voting by soldiers fighting in the Civil War. The United Kingdom also allowed absentee voting for soldiers in 1918. After WWII Indonesia adopted legislation in 1953 which allowed not just military personnel or other public servants but also migrant workers and students to vote from abroad. The biggest expansion of external voting occurred in the 1990s.

== Causes and consequences ==
There are a number of different reasons which explain why and when states enfranchise non-resident citizens. One factor is that states seek benefits from emigrants, i.e. states hope that emigrants will be more likely to contribute to the economy of their country of origin through remittances or show loyalty in other ways if they have the right to vote in that country's elections. Second, the enfranchisement of non-resident citizens may be the result of lobbying by emigrant organizations. This played a role in the Mexican case. Third, governing parties will resist non-resident citizen voting if they have grounds to believe that extending the franchise will benefit the opposition. Thus, non-resident citizen voting becomes possible once the opponents of non-resident citizen voting lose power as happened in Italy in the 1990s. Finally, Turcu and Urbatch found evidence for the diffusion of democratic norms favoring non-resident citizen voting. Once one country introduces non-resident citizen voting, neighboring countries become more likely to do the same.

== Normative debates ==
Political theorists and legal scholars have debated the merits of and problems with non-resident citizen voting. Political theorist and citizenship scholar Rainer Bauböck has evaluated a number of arguments in favor of non-resident citizen voting. First, in a democracy all citizens beyond the minimum age requirement should have the right to vote, and non-resident citizens are still citizens and thus should have the right to vote. Second, non-resident citizens make important economic contributions to their countries of origin, and the value of these contributions should be recognized by offering them the right to vote. Ultimately, Bauböck favors a third approach centered around the concept of stakeholder community. He proposes the "[i]ndividuals whose circumstances of life link their future well-being to the flourishing of a particular polity should be recognized as stakeholders in that polity with a claim to participate in collective decision-making processes that shape the shared future of this political community" (page 2422). Thus, the first generation should be allowed to vote in elections in their countries of origin. According to Bauböck, this privilege should not automatically be extended to the second or subsequent generations.

The legal scholar Ruth Rubio Marin is more critical of proposals to extend voting rights to non-resident citizens. She argues that "[a]bsentee voting is an option that, under certain circumstances, sending countries may legitimately embrace; it is not a right that diasporic national communities can simply assert" (page 145).

== By jurisdiction ==
=== Australia ===
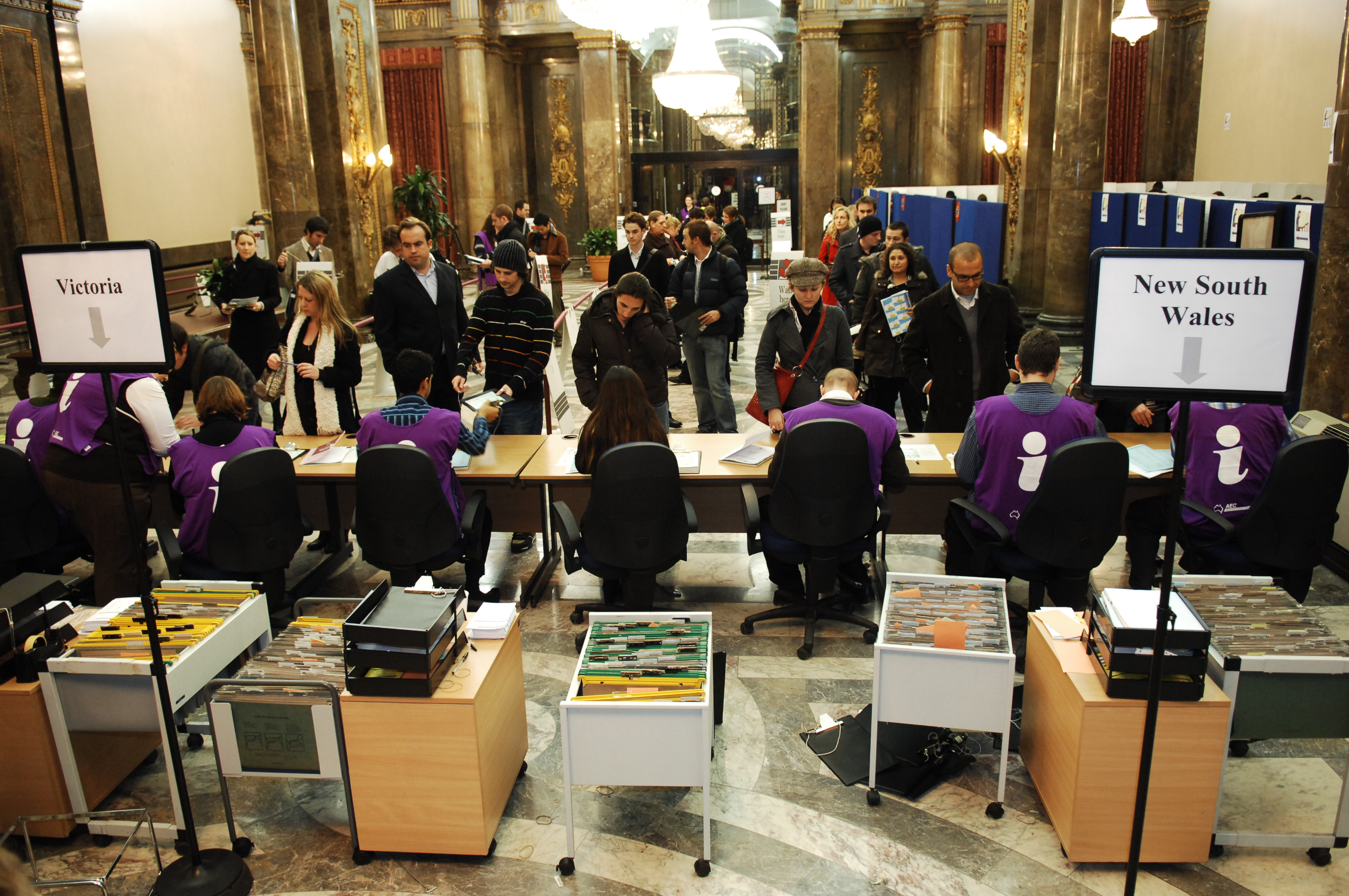
Overseas voters inside Australia House, London, to vote in the 2007 Australian federal election

Australian citizens living abroad may vote if they register to vote within three years of leaving and intend to return to Australia within six years of leaving. Australians who were under 18 when they left Australia may vote if they intend to return to Australia within six years of their 18th birthday. Voting may be done by post or at an Australian embassy, consulate or high commission. Unlike for Australians living in Australia, voting is not compulsory for expatriate Australians.

For the 2023 Australian Indigenous Voice referendum, overseas voting centres were operational at Australian diplomatic offices in 80 countries and territories. While most countries and territories only had one polling place, multiple were available for voters in Brazil, Canada, China, Germany, India, Indonesia, Italy, Japan, New Zealand, Papua New Guinea, Switzerland, Turkey, the United Arab Emirates, the United States and Vietnam. Additionally, telephone voting was available for Australian citizens in Antarctica.

For state and territory elections, the availability of overseas polling places is limited, though interstate polling places are operational for state and territory elections in every state and territory. In New South Wales, voters living or travelling overseas must vote by post unless they are able to vote at an in-person early voting centre in New Zealand. In other jurisdictions, overseas voters normally have to either vote by post or vote online.

=== Austria ===
Austrian citizens living abroad may vote by post in Austrian presidential and parliamentary elections, as well as referendums, with no expiry date. They must enrol on a dedicated foreign voters' register and must renew their registration every ten years.

=== Bangladesh ===
Under the Voter List Ordinance of 2007, Bangladeshi citizens living abroad ware deemed to be residents of the constituency where they had previously lived or where they still maintained ancestral property. However, there are currently no mechanisms in place for postal or proxy voting for them, meaning that they have to travel to the constituency in which they were registered in order to exercise their right to vote. An earlier pilot project to register Bangladeshi voters in Malaysia in 2019 was put on hold due to the COVID-19 pandemic, although in May 2023, the country's Election Commission began registering voters in the United Arab Emirates through its missions in Dubai and Abu Dhabi.

=== Belgium ===
As of 2017, Belgian citizens living abroad can register to vote for elections to the Chamber of Representatives and the European Parliament. Once registered in a consular post (which is optional), the person is subject to compulsory voting. Expatriates cannot vote in regional or local elections.

The very first legislation regarding eligible Belgians abroad was implemented during 1919–25 to accommodate Belgian military stationed in German territories after World War I. Their votes were cast on an earlier date and sent to their corresponding electoral district in Belgium.

The first modern law, the law of 18 December 1998, gave Belgians living abroad the right to vote in federal elections (i.e. for the Chamber and Senate). However, the law was inadequate and not generally applied.

The law of 7 March 2002 improved the procedure. Belgians abroad could register in a municipality of their choice, determining the constituency in which their vote would be cast. In practice, most votes were cast in the linguistically sensitive Brussels-Halle-Vilvoorde constituency.

The sixth Belgian state reform (ca. 2012), which also abolished the Brussels-Halle-Vilvoorde constituency and direct Senate elections, replaced the free choice by an objectively defined municipality (where the person last lived, or else further criteria apply).

The law of 17 November 2016 slightly changed the procedure, and also extended the right to vote for European Parliament elections to Belgians living in a non-EU member state. Belgians living in another EU member state already had the right to vote on Belgian lists in European Parliament elections.

On 26 August 2016, the cabinet also approved the right to vote in regional elections; however, this change is subject to approval by special majority in parliament, causing the measure to stall.

=== Brazil ===
Brazilian citizens living abroad aged between 18 and 70 must vote, as Brazil's policy of compulsory voting includes expatriate Brazilians. Voting is possible, but not mandatory, for Brazilian expatriates aged over 70 or under 18 (Brazil's minimum voting age is 16). Brazilian voters abroad cast ballots only for presidential elections.

=== Canada ===
Per Bill C-76, Canadian expatriates may vote in federal elections by post or in person, no matter how long they've lived outside the country.

Previously, Canadian law dictated that citizens living abroad could only vote by post if they had lived outside the country for less than five consecutive years (citizens that worked for the Canadian government, a Canadian company or an international organisation in which Canada was involved were exempt from this rule). On 11 January 2019, the Supreme Court of Canada, after deliberating the case of Frank v Canada for which the Ontario Court of Appeal had upheld these restrictions, struck down the restrictions. The Supreme Court of Canada ruling affirmed the rights of long-term expats to vote.

Citizens living abroad have always maintained their eligibility to vote in person if possible.

=== Chile ===
Chilean expatriates have the right to vote in presidential elections (primaries, first and second round) and national referendums in the consulate where they registered. The law allowing expatriate Chilean citizens the right to vote was presented by President Michelle Bachelet and approved by Congress in August 2016. The primaries for the 2017 presidential election were the first time that expatriates were allowed to vote.

=== Colombia ===
Regardless of their time living abroad, Colombian expatriates enjoy full voting rights in national referendums, presidential and parliamentary elections. One member of the House of Representatives comes from the international constituency and is elected exclusively by citizens living abroad. In order to vote, Colombian citizens have to register in their respective consulate or embassy in the established periods before the election dates.

=== Costa Rica ===
Costa Rican citizens can vote for president and national referendums regardless of their time living abroad since Electoral Code's reform of 2010. They can't, however, vote in local elections which includes deputies and municipal authorities. The first time this was implemented was in the 2014 Costa Rican general election. Costa Ricans vote in the respective consulate or embassy and have to register their location a year before the election.

=== Czech Republic ===
Czech citizens living abroad may participate in elections. Their votes must be cast at polling stations or sent by post, if they choose to vote using postal voting. For the 2021 election, before postal voting was possible, Czech expats were trying to raise awareness of the difficulty to attend polling stations and called for the ability to vote by post.

Postal voting for cilizen living or stationed abroad is allowed since 2024. It is allowed for elections to the Chamber of deputies, Presidential election and the election to the European parliament.

=== Denmark ===
Danish citizens who leave Denmark may vote in parliamentary elections, referendums and EU Parliament elections (but not local elections) for two years after their move, after which they are disenfranchised unless and until they move back. There are exceptions granting indefinite overseas voting rights for certain categories of expatriates, primarily those working for the Danish government or on job assignments for Danish employers.

For EU Parliament elections, Danish citizens living in EU countries may continue to vote indefinitely.

Danes Worldwide wishes to improve voting rights for citizens abroad, and favors amending the Constitution to do so. In 2024, longtime Danish politician Bertel Haarder publicly endorsed this position.

=== Dominican Republic ===
Dominican citizens abroad can vote for presidential and legislative elections, with seven seats in the Chamber of Deputies reserved for them. Three of them correspond to the United States and Canada, two to Latin America and the Caribbean and another two to Europe. This has been enshrined in the constitution since 2010 and was first implemented in the 2012 Dominican presidential election.

=== El Salvador ===
On 18 October 2022, the Legislative Assembly of El Salvador passed the "Special Law for the Exercise of Suffrage Abroad" to allow citizens abroad to vote in presidential and legislative elections. In November 2022, the Supreme Electoral Court stated it would guarantee the right of Salvadorans abroad to vote in the 2024 presidential and legislative elections.

=== Finland ===
Finnish citizens living abroad are eligible to vote in Parliamentary elections and presidential elections. They may also vote in the elections for the European Parliament provided they have not registered to vote in their country of residence.

=== France ===
French citizens living abroad enjoy full voting rights in presidential and parliamentary elections, regardless of how long they have lived abroad.

France has a dedicated Assembly of French Citizens Abroad, the president of which is the French Foreign Minister. France also has a system of 11 constituencies for French residents overseas, each of which are represented by a deputy who sits in the National Assembly.

=== Germany ===
Article 12(2)(1) of the Federal Voting Act states that German citizens who live abroad and have no residence in Germany may vote in German parliamentary elections and European Parliament elections if:

1. They have resided in Germany for an uninterrupted period of at least three months since their 14th birthday and within the last 25 years; or
2. They have a close personal and direct relationship with German politics and are personally affected by political developments in Germany.

=== Guinea-Bissau ===
Guinea-Bissau has two overseas constituencies - one for Africa (Senegal, Gambia, Guinea, Cape Verde and Mauritania) and one for Europe (Portugal, Spain, France, Belgium and England).

=== Greece ===
Expatriate Greek citizens are allowed to vote in home country elections under certain conditions.

=== Hungary ===
In Hungary, there are effectively two types of non-resident citizens with different voting rights, on account of the electoral system used for the National Assembly, and the large number of ethnic Hungarians in neighbouring countries like Romania holding Hungarian citizenship, who have had the right to vote since 2012, but may never have lived in Hungary itself. Those previously resident in Hungary and enrolled to vote in a constituency, are considered to be temporarily abroad and have full voting rights, casting one vote for a candidate in a single-member constituency and another for a party list for a nationwide constituency, though may only do so in person in their constituency, or at a Hungarian embassy or consulate, whereas those who were not, only have a list vote, though they may vote by mail. With regard to elections to the European Parliament, Hungarian citizens resident in another European Union member state have the option of voting in a constituency in that member state, those resident in a country outside the EU may only vote in the "Hungary" constituency.

=== Iceland ===
Icelandic citizens living abroad remain on the voter roll for 16 years after leaving Iceland, after which they must re-register.

=== India ===
Expatriate Indian citizens have been allowed to vote in all Indian elections since 2010, provided that they have not acquired the citizenship of another country (India does not permit dual nationality). However, overseas voters must be physically present at their original constituency to vote, making it infeasible for most expatriates to actually cast their votes.

=== Indonesia ===
Eligible Indonesians living abroad are able to vote by mail or at diplomatic missions in national elections by registering at the Indonesian overseas election commission in their country of residence. Besides presidential elections, they are also able to vote in DPR elections. All overseas Indonesian voters are included in the Jakarta 2nd constituency, which also contains Central and South Jakarta.

=== Ireland ===
At most elections in Ireland the electoral register is based on residential address, and the only nonresident voters are those serving abroad on government business; this includes Irish diplomats and their spouses, and Defence Forces and Garda Síochána personnel but not their spouses. An exception is in elections to the Seanad (upper house) for which graduates voting in the university constituencies (National University of Ireland and Dublin University) may be nonresident. Expatriates intending to return to Ireland within eighteen months may retain their Irish address for electoral purposes, but must be present to vote in person. Since the 1990s there have been proposals to allow emigrants to vote in elections to the Dáil (lower house) or Seanad, generally via a dedicated (single transferable vote multi-seat) constituency. In 2017 the government agreed to allow expatriate citizens to vote in presidential elections and promised a constitutional referendum to be held alongside the 2019 local election.

=== Israel ===
Israeli citizens may vote regardless of their current resident status. However, in practice, Israeli citizens abroad are required to travel to Israel in order to vote, because voting is only possible in ballot boxes, and ballot boxes are only set up in Israel and in the occupied Palestinian territories. (Voting outside of Israel is available to restricted groups of military and diplomatic personnel that are stationed outside of Israel.)

=== Italy ===
Italian citizens living abroad retain the right to vote in Italian parliamentary elections and referendums. They may vote either by post or at an Italian consulate or embassy. However, for Italian citizens who live in a country which has no Italian diplomatic representation, the only way to vote is to travel to Italy to vote in person. Citizens who choose to do so are reimbursed by the Italian government for 75% of their travel costs.

The Italian Parliament reserves 12 seats for those citizens residing abroad: there are eight such seats in the Chamber of Deputies and four in the Senate of the Republic.

=== Japan ===
Japanese citizens living abroad have been allowed to vote in Diet elections since 2005, when the Supreme Court ruled that a ban on eligible overseas Japanese citizens from voting was unconstitutional. Citizens can vote either by post or at their local Japanese embassy or consulate.

=== Lithuania ===
Lithuania established a single-member "World Lithuanians' constituency" in the Seimas, its unicameral parliament, for its citizens abroad in 2019, taking effect with the 2020 parliamentary election. However, a low turnout in the 2024 elections prompted calls for the constituency to be abolished.

=== Luxembourg ===
Luxembourg citizens living abroad may vote in parliamentary elections and referendums, but not local elections.

=== Malta ===
Maltese citizens may only vote if they have resided in Malta for at least six months in the previous eighteen months prior to registration in the electoral register. Although the law clearly states a residency requirement, it is rarely enforced and hundreds of expatriate fly down to Malta to vote in Elections. There have been attempts and petitions to allow Maltese citizens living abroad to vote by post.

=== Mexico ===
Starting in 2021, former residents are allowed to vote for an expatriate representative in the Mexico City Congress.

=== Morocco ===
Only Moroccan citizens living in Morocco are able to vote in the elections.

=== Namibia ===
Namibian citizens living abroad have been allowed to vote in national elections since 2014, when amendments were made to the Electoral Act 2009, Namibian expatriates may vote at temporary registration points, usually set up at Namibian embassies or high commissions.

=== Netherlands ===
Dutch citizens who live abroad (and have deregistered as Dutch residents) are allowed to vote in elections for the House of Representatives, the European Parliament and an electoral college for the Senate, but cannot vote in municipal or provincial elections. They must register as voters in order to vote from abroad. Dutch citizens in the constituent countries of Sint-Maarten, Aruba and Curaçao may register at the Municipality of The Hague as a Dutch voter abroad, but only if they a) had previously been resident in the Netherlands for at least ten years prior to registration, worked for the Dutch public service, or have a spouse, partner, parent or guardian working for the Dutch public service and share a joint household with them.

=== New Zealand ===
New Zealand citizens living abroad have full voting rights with no expiry date as long as they have lived in New Zealand for at least one year continuously at some point in their lives and have visited New Zealand within the last three years, while permanent residents are eligible to vote if they have visited the country in the past twelve months; in 2023 this was temporarily changed for the 2023 general election, with citizens being eligible if they had visited the country in the past six years, and permanent residents eligible if they had visited in the past four years.

=== Nigeria ===
Nigerian citizens living abroad have full voting rights, however, these rights have not been enacted as the National Assembly and Independent National Electoral Commission are yet to come to an agreement on how to actualize expatriate voting. In 2021, Minister of State for Foreign Affairs Zubairu Dada reiterated the Government's intent to enact diaspora voting, albeit not in time for the 2023 Nigerian general election.

=== North Macedonia ===
Under amendments to North Macedonia's electoral code in 2008, which came into effect with the 2011 Macedonian parliamentary elections, citizens resident abroad were entitled to elect three deputies to the Assembly of North Macedonia, from single-member constituencies, one for Europe and Africa, one for North and South America, and one for Australia and Asia, but only a total of 7,213 registered to vote. This was also used in the 2014 parliamentary elections. However, it was discontinued in 2016, as under changes to the electoral code in 2015, in which a single three-member constituency was created for citizens abroad, candidates were required to have a minimum number of votes, equivalent to those in constituencies in the country itself but these criteria were not met.

=== Norway ===
Norwegian citizens living abroad remain on the voter roll for 10 years after leaving Norway, after which they must re-register. Those living in Svalbard or Jan Mayen registered in the electoral register in the municipality where they were most recently registered in the National Population Registry as resident.

=== Pakistan ===
Following a Supreme Court decision in 2018, which ruled that overseas Pakistanis had the right to vote, the Pakistan Tehreek-e-Insaf government made amendments to the 2017 Elections Act, to enable citizens abroad to vote using electronic voting machines, but this was reversed by the incoming Pakistan Muslim League (Nawaz) government in 2022. Earlier in opposition, the PML (N) had suggested reserving seats for Pakistanis abroad in the country's Parliament, with the party's president, Shehbaz Sharif, proposing that five to seven seats in the National Assembly and two seats in the Senate be created for this purpose.

=== Peru ===
Peruvian citizens living abroad aged between 18 and 70 must vote, as Peru's policy of compulsory voting includes expatriate Peruvians. Nevertheless, the penalty fee for failing to vote is automatically waived for all Peruvians abroad. Voting is possible, but not mandatory, for Peruvian expatriates aged over 70. Peruvian expatriates have the right to vote in presidential (first and second round) elections, congressional elections, and election for representative to the Andean Parliament as well as national referendums in the consulate where they are registered. As of 2021, two members of Congress come from the international constituency and are elected exclusively by citizens living abroad.

=== Philippines ===
Under Republic Act No. 9189 (also known as the Overseas Absentee Voting Act of 2003), Filipino citizens living and working abroad are allowed to vote, with no expiry date.

=== Poland ===
Polish citizens can vote abroad in the presidential elections, parliamentary elections, elections to the European Parliament and referendums but not in local elections. In the 2020 Polish presidential election, there were 169 polling districts abroad (the largest number: 15 in Germany, 11 in the UK, and 9 in the USA) plus 4 polling districts on ships and another 4 on oil platforms; in the 2019 Polish parliamentary election, there were 320 polling districts abroad (the largest number: 54 in the UK, 48 in the USA, and 23 in Germany) plus 5 polling districts on ships and oil platforms; in the 2019 European Parliament election, there were 195 polling districts abroad plus 3 polling districts on ships and oil platforms; in the 2015 Polish referendum, there were polling districts in 86 countries abroad plus on some ships.

=== Portugal ===
Article 49 of the Portuguese Constitution grants all Portuguese citizens the right to vote, regardless of where they live.

Portugal has a Council of Portuguese Communities (Conselho das Comunidades Portuguesas), a consultative body which is part of the Portuguese government and represents the interests of Portuguese citizens living abroad.

4 seats of the Portuguese Parliament (out of 230) are reserved for those living abroad: 2 mandates allocated for Europe, the other 2 from outside Europe.

=== Romania ===
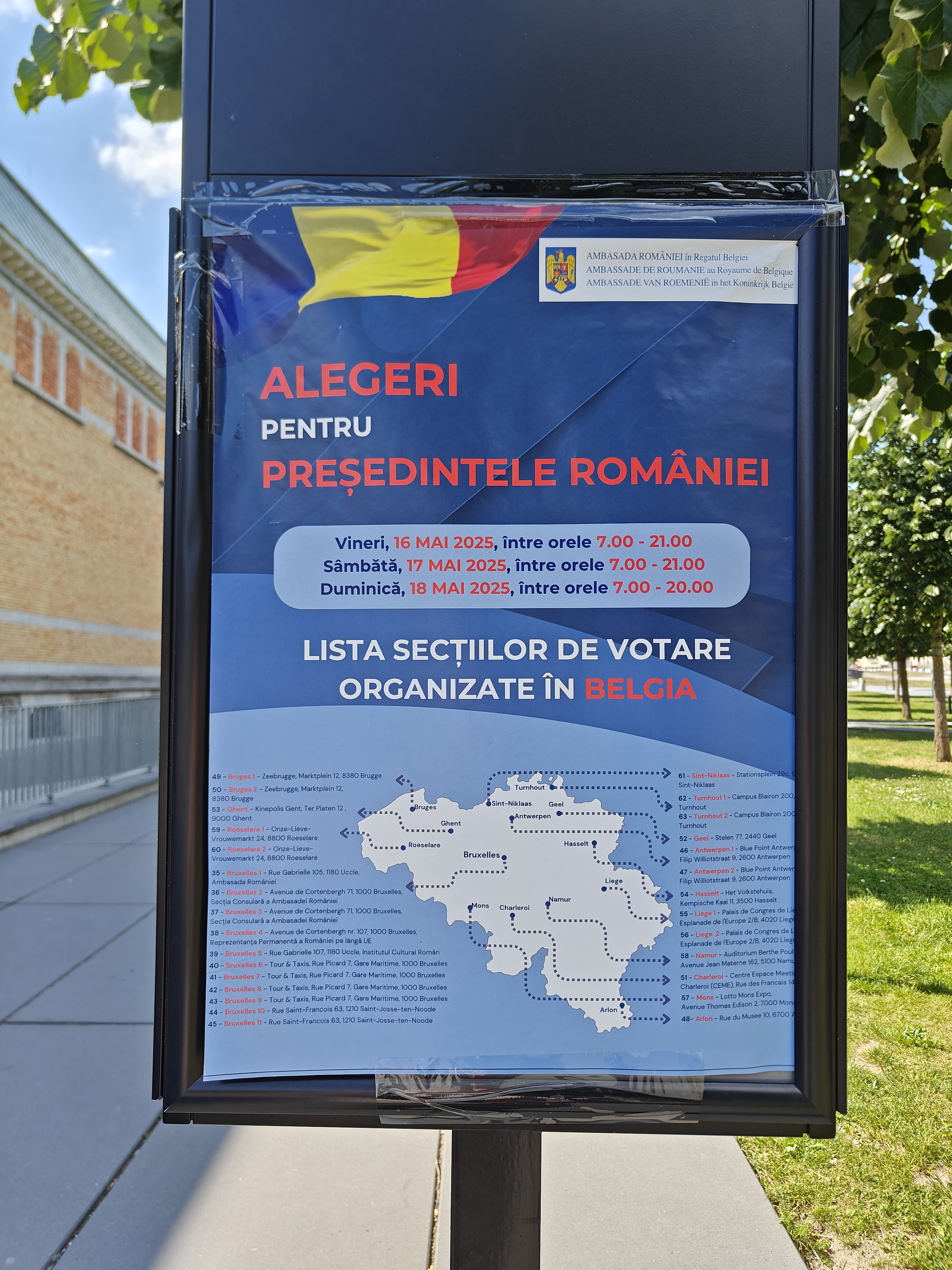
Polling locations in Belgium for the 2025 Romanian presidential election

Romanian citizens living abroad may vote in presidential, parliamentary and European Parliament elections. For presidential elections, they can vote by registering for a postal vote or by going to a polling station abroad. In parliamentary elections, Romanians abroad are represented in Parliament by four members of the Chamber of Deputies and two members of the Senate.

=== Singapore ===
Singaporean citizens living abroad may vote in presidential and parliamentary elections, with no expiry date. Citizens are required to be a resident in Singapore for an aggregate of at least 30 days during the 3-year period before the cut-off date, or be overseas for reasons of employment or education related to the Singapore government, The overseas voting was added to the Elections Act on 15 May 2001, and are required to provide both a registered Local Contact Address (LCA) and an overseas address on the voter's residence registered with the Immigration & Checkpoints Authority (ICA). The overseas voting was first used in the 2006 election.

Prior to 2023, they may only vote in person at one of ten designated overseas polling stations, located in various places such as Australia (Canberra), China (two polling stations: Beijing and Shanghai), Japan (Tokyo), Hong Kong, the United Arab Emirates (Dubai), the United Kingdom (London) and the United States (three polling stations: New York City, San Francisco and Washington, D.C.). Each citizen is assigned to an overseas polling station depending on where they live. Expatriate citizens are also assigned a polling station in Singapore, where they can vote in person if they happen to be in Singapore on election day. Voting is compulsory as with the local electorate, and depending on the country's time zone and Daylight Saving Time, polling station opens at different timings with either the same 12-hour voting window or being extended.

In 2023, an amendment to the Presidential Elections Act and Parliamentary Elections Act was tabled in Parliament that enables Singaporeans living abroad to vote by post in subsequent elections, giving them an additional option. For this method, electors must postmark their downloaded copy of the ballot paper using a provided envelope and send it by before polling day, and must reach Singapore within 10 days after polling day.

=== Slovakia ===
Citizens of Slovakia may vote as non-residents only via mail-in voting. To utilize this right they have to get registered to a special voters' list at least 52 days prior to the election. Mail-in voting can be used only for the elections to the National Council and for national referendums.

=== South Africa ===
Pursuant to the revised section 33 (3) and (4) of the Electoral Amendment Act 18 of 2013, South African citizens living abroad are able to exercise the right to vote in national elections, and are also able to register from outside the country. Expatriate citizens who wish to vote must do so in person at a South African embassy, consulate or high commission. While South Africans abroad could initially only register in person at a diplomatic mission, as of 2023 they are able to register to vote online.

=== South Korea ===
In South Korea, the overseas South Korean citizen voting system was implemented from 1967 to 1971 for presidential and general elections, but was abolished in 1972 when the National Conference for Unification was established along with the constitutional amendment. Then, in 2007, the Constitutional Court of South Korea ruled that restrictions on voting rights of South Korean citizens living overseas are nonconformable to the constitution, and on 12 February 2009, the election law was revised to allow overseas nationals to vote.

=== Spain ===
Article 68, Section 5 of the Spanish Constitution guarantees Spanish citizens living abroad the right to vote. They may do so either at a Spanish consulate or embassy, or by post.

Spain has a General Council of Spanish Citizenship Abroad (Consejo General de la Ciudadanía Española en el Exterior, CGCDE), an advisory body which represents the interests of Spanish citizens living abroad.

=== Sweden ===
Swedish nationals living abroad who have been registered as residents in Sweden are automatically entitled to vote in Riksdag elections and European Parliamentary elections (for those living in another EU Member State) up to ten years after leaving Sweden. There is no time limit to eligibility, but after the initial 10-year period has elapsed, Swedish expatriates must renew their electoral roll registration by filling out a form every 10 years. They cannot vote in either county or municipal elections. Voting take place either by post or at Swedish embassies. Citizens who have never lived in Sweden are not entitled to vote.

=== Switzerland ===
Swiss citizens living abroad may vote, with no expiry date, in elections for the National Council (lower house of parliament) and in federal referendums, provided that they register with the relevant Swiss representation abroad. Their eligibility to vote in elections for the Council of States (upper house of parliament) and in cantonal and municipal elections depends on the law of the canton in which the person was registered before leaving Switzerland.

=== Taiwan ===
Expatriate suffrage is limited to overseas citizens who have once had household registration in the “Free Area”, and voting is possible only for presidential elections. There is no provision for absentee voting. Voters wanting to exercise this right need to apply to be on the electoral roll before each election; this can be done by post. Then they must physically return to vote at their own polling stations on polling day.

=== Tunisia ===
Tunisian expatriates have been granted the right to vote in presidential elections since 1988, and additionally in parliamentary elections since the Tunisian Revolution in 2011. The number of diaspora representatives in the Tunisian parliament is proportional to the size of the diaspora, which makes Tunisia unique.

=== Turkey ===
Turkish non-resident citizens have been able to vote in presidential, parliamentary elections and referendums from their country of residences since 2012.

=== Tuvalu ===
Tuvaluan citizens residing abroad may vote in Tuvaluan elections if they have been resident in Tuvalu for two of the last three years, or if they own land in the electoral district in which they are registered.

=== Ukraine ===
There is a foreign electoral district of Ukraine for national-level but not local elections purposes. Since 2019 it formally excludes the territory of Russia as a place where participants can cast a vote from. As of the day of voting of 2019 Ukrainian parliamentary election, there were 102 polling stations in 72 countries of the World, including 5 in Germany, 4 in the United States, Poland and Italy, and 3 in Canada, Spain, Turkey and China.

=== United Kingdom ===
British citizens living abroad can vote in general elections and referendums, with no time limit. The Elections Act 2022 removed the previous rule whereby British citizens residing abroad could vote for up to 15 years after ceasing to live in the UK. This rule was a hotly debated topic among British citizens abroad, particularly those who had lived in European Union Member States for more than 15 years at the time of referendum on European Union membership, and were thus barred from voting in it despite it being argued that they were more affected by the result than British people living in the UK. The Government intended that registration of overseas electors would be possible from in the autumn of 2023 but the required secondary legislation was only laid before Parliament on 23 October 2023. Registration subsequently became possible on 16 January 2024.

=== United States ===
US citizens living abroad enjoy full federal voting rights, regardless of how long they have lived abroad. In addition, 38 states, plus the District of Columbia, allow US citizens who have never resided in the US to vote in the state if, at a minimum, it is where their parent or legal guardian last resided. However, some states restrict overseas voters to federal elections only, or allow them to vote only if they have not previously registered or voted in another state. These states include:

- Alaska (only federal elections if no intent to return)
- Arizona
- California (only if voter has not registered or voted in any other state)
- Colorado
- Connecticut (only federal elections)
- Delaware (only federal elections)
- District of Columbia
- Georgia
- Hawaii
- Illinois (only federal elections)
- Iowa
- Kansas
- Kentucky
- Maine
- Massachusetts
- Michigan
- Minnesota (only federal elections if no intent to return)
- Montana
- Nebraska (only if voter has not registered or voted in any other state)
- Nevada (only if voter has not registered or voted in any other state)
- New Hampshire
- New Jersey
- New Mexico
- New York (only federal elections if no intent to return)
- North Carolina
- North Dakota
- Ohio
- Oklahoma
- Oregon (only if voter intends to reside in Oregon, has a parent, legal guardian, or spouse who is a military or overseas voter under Oregon law and whose last U.S. residence was in Oregon)
- Rhode Island (only federal elections)
- South Carolina
- South Dakota (only if voter has not registered or voted in any other state)
- Tennessee
- Utah (only if voter has not registered or voted in any other state, and only federal elections)
- Vermont
- Virginia (only if voter has not registered or voted in any other state)
- Washington
- West Virginia
- Wisconsin (only federal elections if no intent to return)
- Wyoming

As of September 6, 2022, in addition to the five U.S. territories, the following 12 states do not allow U.S. citizens who have never resided in the state to vote there: Alabama, Arkansas, Florida, Idaho, Indiana, Louisiana, Maryland, Mississippi, Missouri, Pennsylvania, Texas, and Utah.

Voting in federal elections for president, vice president, and U.S. Congress has no influence on the voter's tax profile or status. Voting does not trigger tax residency or filing requirements.

Additionally, the Democratic Party, through its overseas arm Democrats Abroad, holds a "global presidential primary" election for U.S. voters abroad. This primary sends its own delegation to the Democratic National Convention. All U.S. citizens who are members of Democrats Abroad are eligible to vote in the primary.

== See also ==
- Diaspora
- Multiple citizenship
- Non-citizen suffrage
- Overseas constituency
- Right of return

Portuguese

- Europe (Assembly of the Republic constituency)
- Outside Europe (Assembly of the Republic constituency)

Brazilians

- Brazilian diaspora

Colombians

- Colombian diaspora
