= National Register of Electors =

Database of eligible electors in Canada

The National Register of Electors (French: Registre national des électeurs) is a continuously updated permanent database of eligible electors for federal elections in Canada maintained by Elections Canada. It was established in December 1996 when Bill C-63 was granted royal assent and the preliminary National Register of Electors was populated with data in April 1997 during the final Canada-wide enumeration. It replaced a system which required door-to-door enumeration of eligible electors for each electoral event. The database contains basic information about electors: name, address, sex, and date of birth. An elector may register or update their personal information between elections, or may request to be excluded from it per the Canada Elections Act. Eligible expatriate Canadians voters are included in the International Register of Electors.

Elections Canada has data sharing arrangements with federal, provincial, territorial, municipal, and other agencies throughout Canada to update the National Register of Electors and ensure its currency, and to enable other jurisdictions to update their respective databases with information from the National Register of Electors. Obtaining data from other parties, and sharing of data with those parties, must be consistent with the Canada Elections Act or the various elections legislation of the respective province or territory. Elections Canada has two-way data sharing arrangements with the electoral agencies of each province and territory except Saskatchewan and Yukon, from which it may obtain but to which it cannot send information.

In conjunction with the National Geographic Database, the National Register of Electors is used to create preliminary voters lists for each electoral district in Canada for each election, by-election, and referendum. Each candidate from each electoral district is given a voters list for that district, which is a subset of the data in the National Register of Electors whose addresses are within the boundaries of the district as defined in the National Geographic Database. That data may only be used for election purposes; any other use of that data subjects the user to penalties including fines, imprisonment, or both. The voter lists are updated by returning officers based on information received during an election campaign, ultimately resulting in final voters lists being distributed by election day.

Use of the National Register of Electors has allowed Elections Canada to avoid over $100 million in election-related expenditures up to the 2006 federal election.

== Creation ==
The creation of a national permanent register of electors was first proposed in the 1930s, but serious consideration for such a project was not established until the 1980s. In 1989, the Government of Canada appointed the Royal Commission on Electoral Reform and Party Financing, which in 1991 "recommended that provincial lists be used for federal purposes". A working group was established in 1995, which in March 1996 submitted the report The Register of Electors Project: A Report on Research and feasibility to the chief electoral officer of Elections Canada. It had six main conclusions:

- a national register would be cost effective and feasible
- the minimum election period could be reduced from 47 to 36 days
- the best sources of information to update the register would be Revenue Canada, files from Citizenship and Immigration Canada, and provincial and territorial driver's licence files and vital statistics files
- there was support amongst provincial and territorial agencies
- legislative changes to the Canada Elections Act and the Income Tax Act would be required
- the registration of electors for the first electoral event to use the register would cost the same as previous enumeration methods, and subsequent elections would avoid costs of about $40 million

To that point, the federal government, through Elections Canada, assumed responsibility for ensuring that every eligible elector was registered for each electoral event. For the 1988 federal general election, this required about 110,000 enumerators, who would canvass door-to-door so the cost and effort to the individual was minimal.

Typically, there would be several visitations for those initially missed or not at home, and while at some point the onus shifted to the uncontacted (and thus unlisted) individual to take some minor steps to become registered, the dominant thrust of the approach amounted to a reaching out on the part of the state — literally to the doorsteps of the citizenry.

— Jerome H. Black, Choices

Canvassing to enumerate electors after drawing up ("dropping") the writ of election ensured that a high proportion of those electors were registered for each election, up to 98 per cent for some elections, minimizing participation inequality which typically affects individuals who are poor, young, or have little formal education that tend to not take the initiative to participate in electoral and related events. State enumeration, such as was done in Canada before the implementation of the National Register of Electors, "worked to augment voter turnout among all segments of society and thus mitigated a natural tendency toward participation inequality in electoral politics".

=== Legislation ===
On 18 December 1996, Governor General Roméo LeBlanc granted Royal Assent to Bill C-63 for the creation of a permanent list of voters to be used for all federal elections and referendums in Canada, the National Register of Electors, to be maintained by Elections Canada. In April 1997, Elections Canada conducted a final house-to-house enumeration throughout Canada to establish the preliminary National Register of Electors, which was used for the Canadian federal election that June.

It replaced a system in which voter enumeration was conducted for each election once a writ of election was issued in the respective jurisdiction. Bill C-63 also reduced the minimum length of election campaigns from 47 days to 36 days, as the time required for voter enumeration was significantly reduced. Five provinces adopted similar provincial registers in the 1990s, joining British Columbia, which had relied on a permanent register for a long time.

Passage of the legislation, based on the earlier recommendation of the working group, was "facilitated by the consensus surrounding a single alternative" for a national register. Moreover, Elections Canada presented the idea to elected officials "at an opportune time, when both government and the main opposition parties found the arguments for change especially compelling and indeed self-serving".

=== Legislative changes ===
The Elections Act as amended by Bill C-2 granted royal assent on 31 May 2000 contained thirteen clauses regarding the National Register of Electors, clauses 44 to 56. Maintenance of the register is specified in clause 44, and clause 45 specifies that "an electronic copy of the Register for each electoral district shall be sent to the MP for the constituency" by 15 October of each year Clause 55 permits the chief electoral officer of Elections Canada to "enter into agreements with provincial bodies responsible for establishing voters' lists" and that a payment may be issued to the provincial body. Prohibition of unauthorized use of the National Register of Electors is stipulated in clause 56, which also prohibits electors from providing false information.

Legislation was later introduced to amend the type of data collected and stored in the National Register of Electors. On 17 May 2007, the privacy commissioner of Canada, Jennifer Stoddart, appeared before the Standing Senate Committee on Legal and Constitutional Affairs regarding Bill C-31, An Act to amend the Canada Elections Act and the Public Service Employment Act submitting a letter in which she criticized the proposed changes to the Canada Elections Act. One of the problems was the inclusion of an elector's date of birth in the voter lists sent to polling stations on election day for use by polling clerks and scrutineers; Stoddart stated that verification of an elector's birth year would be sufficient. The second problem she raised was inclusion of the date of birth in the voter lists sent to each candidate for all electoral districts in Canada, and also to all political parties.

Providing date of birth information to politicians for the purpose of target-marketing of constituents is neither a use consistent with protecting the integrity of the electoral system nor a use that a person would reasonably expect when registering to vote.

— Jennifer Stoddart, Office of the Privacy Commissioner of Canada

She stated that inclusion of this information in the voter lists sent to candidates does not "contribute to protecting or improving the integrity of the electoral process".

Despite this, the committee recommended inclusion of an elector's date of birth in the elector lists "on the grounds that this would provide a further safeguard against electoral fraud, especially in cases where a prospective voter presents himself or herself at a poll without adequate identification", and this was included in the committee stage in the House of Commons. At the committee stage in the Senate, an amendment to sections 107(2) and (3) of Bill C-31 was made so that "lists provided to candidates will not include the elector's date of birth or the elector's sex", which is the version that was ultimately granted royal assent.

Bill C-31 also introduced the use of a unique personal identifier for each elector in the National Register of Electors, and changed the date by which electronic elector lists are to be made available to members of Parliament for an electoral district to 15 November from 15 October.

=== Unauthorized use ===
Unauthorized use of data contained in the National Register of Electors or the list of electors generated from it may result in the imposition of a maximum penalty of a $5,000 fine or one year in prison.

== Data sharing ==
The Canada Elections Act permits Elections Canada to synchronize the data in the National Register of Electors with information obtained from external parties. These include federal agencies and Crown corporations including the Canada Revenue Agency, Canada Post (via the National Change of Address service), and Citizenship and Immigration Canada. It also specifies that Elections Canada may obtain information from other jurisdictions, such as from provincial and territorial motor vehicle registrars, and provincial electoral agencies with permanent voters lists. Since 1999, Elections Canada has convened the Advisory Committee of Electoral Partners annually (known as the National Register of Electors Advisory Committee until 2008), usually in November in Ottawa, to discuss the permanent elector databases, data sharing arrangements, and other related topics.

In July 1998, Elections Canada signed a one-year interim agreement with the Division of Driver and Vehicle Licensing in Manitoba to transfer driver licence records to Elections Canada every three months. In September 1998, the first batch of data on storage tape contained in a plastic cartridge was sent to Elections Canada; it had information about 675,000 licensed drivers in Manitoba. In January 1999, Elections Canada lost the tape. A report about the investigation stated that "the tape had been deposited inadvertently into Elections Canada's non-recyclable waste"; before the investigation, there had been concern that the tape and its data had been stolen. It resulted in separate investigations by Privacy Commissioner of Canada George Radwanski, the Office of the Manitoba Ombudsman, and an audit commissioned by Elections Canada conducted by a private security firm. The interim agreement lapsed without renewal.

As a result of this incident, Elections Canada changed its practice so that "upon receipt...these tapes are now sent directly to the secured computer room".

Sources of data for the National Register of Electors
Jurisdiction	Agency or department	Database or data source	Notes
Federal	Canada Post	Change of Address records	Requires consent of individual.
Federal	Canada Revenue Agency	Income Tax returns	Tax filer must consent on prepared income tax statement. Data obtained includes name, address, sex and citizenship status of eligible elector, and information about deceased electors.
Federal	Citizenship and Immigration Canada	Naturalisation data	Requires consent of individual.
Alberta	Elections Alberta	Elector list
British Columbia	Elections BC	Elector list
Manitoba	Elections Manitoba	Elector list
Manitoba	Vital Statistics Agency (Manitoba Consumer and Corporate Affairs)	Decedent data
New Brunswick	Elections New Brunswick	Elector list
Newfoundland and Labrador	Elections Newfoundland & Labrador	Elector list
Northwest Territories	Elections NWT	Elector list
Nova Scotia	Elections Nova Scotia	Elector list
Nunavut	Elections Nunavut	Elector list
Ontario	Elections Ontario	Permanent Register of Ontario	Residents may opt to prevent PREO from sending data to the NRE
Ontario	Municipal Property Assessment Corporation	Voters lists for municipal and school board elections
Prince Edward Island	Elections Prince Edward Island	Elector list
Quebec	Chief Electoral Officer of Quebec	Elector list
Saskatchewan	Elections Saskatchewan	Elector list
Yukon	Elections Yukon	Elector list
City of Winnipeg		Municipal electoral lists

Each province's election legislation specifies how its provincial register of electors is created and maintained, the information it may release for external use (such as integration into the National Register of Electors), and the information it may receive from external parties, such as the National Register of Electors, provincial driver's licence records, and provincial vital statistics records. Section 55 of the Canada Elections Act permits the chief electoral officer of Elections Canada "to enter into agreements with provincial election authorities to share information contained in the National Register with those provincial authorities". A clause in section 56 ensures that data shared in this manner may be used by the provincial or territorial agency, and "that it is not an offence to knowingly use personal information obtained from the Register in accordance with any conditions in an agreement entered into with the Chief Electoral Officer pursuant to section 55".

Users of data from the National Register of Electors
Jurisdiction	Agency or department	Database	Sources of information	Notes
Alberta	Elections Alberta		National Register of Electors	Filters acquired data to include only individuals meeting six-month residency requirement.
British Columbia	Elections BC		National Register of Electors	Filters acquired data to include only individuals meeting six-month residency requirement.
Manitoba	Elections Manitoba		National Register of Electors
New Brunswick	Elections New Brunswick		National Register of Electors
Newfoundland and Labrador	Elections Newfoundland & Labrador	Voters list	National Register of Electors
Nova Scotia	Elections Nova Scotia		National Register of Electors
Northwest Territories	Elections NWT		National Register of Electors, medical insurance data, Student Financial Assistance program data, voter registration data of municipal and Aboriginal governments
Nunavut	Elections Nunavut		National Register of Electors
Ontario	Elections Ontario	Permanent Register of Ontario	National Register of Electors
Ontario	Municipal Property Assessment Corporation	Voters lists for municipal and school board elections	National Register of Electors, property ownership and tenant data
Prince Edward Island	Elections Prince Edward Island		National Register of Electors
Quebec	Chief Electoral Officer of Quebec		National Register of Electors

== Voter registration ==
To register with the National Register of Electors, individuals who will be at least 18 years old at the next election must complete a form certifying Canadian citizenship and providing proof of identity and residential address. Registration will result in the assignment to the individual's entry in the National Register of Electors of a unique identifier that is randomly generated, associating that identifier with the elector's name, address, sex, and date of birth. That individual will then be eligible to cast a ballot in the electoral district in which the individual is normally resident. An elector may register or update their personal information between elections, or may request to be excluded from the National Register of Electors per section 44(3) of the Canada Elections Act.

The National Register of Electors is updated to reflect various changes in the Canadian population, including address changes, reaching voting age, naturalization, and death. Every year, about 3,000,000 address changes are processed by Elections Canada from information obtained from the Canada Revenue Agency, Canada Post, provincial and territorial motor vehicle registrars, and provincial electoral agencies with permanent voters lists. Every year, about 400,000 Canadians reach voting age and 200,000 Canadians die, resulting in changes to the National Register of Electors based on information obtained from the Canada Revenue Agency, provincial and territorial motor vehicle registrars, and provincial electoral agencies with permanent voters lists. Additionally, 120,000 individuals a year become naturalized Canadians, and are added to the National Register of Electors by Elections Canada based on information obtained from Citizenship and Immigration Canada. Collectively, these represent about 20 per cent of the entries in the National Register of Electors.

Information provided by Canadian residents to the Canada Revenue Agency will only be shared with Elections Canada if the resident consents to such a transfer in their income tax and benefits return. If consent is granted, the Canada Revenue Agency will provide the resident's "name, address, date of birth, and Canadian citizenship information". Bill C-31 introduced an amendment to the Act to ensure that tax filers consenting to their personal information being included in the National Register of Electors are Canadian citizens; before this change, it was possible for non-citizen taxpayers to consent, and thus be included in the National Register of Electors, despite not being an eligible elector.

As part of the mandate of The Office of the Chief Electoral Officer, electoral event readiness was identified as a necessity in order to be consistent with the goal of an "electoral process that contributes to fairness, transparency and accessibility for all participants, in compliance with the legislative framework". One element to achieve and maintain a state of readiness for "electoral events whenever they may be called" is the "currency and coverage of National Register of Electors".

As part of the process, Elections Canada mails out letters to 18-year-old citizens explaining how to register for inclusion on the voters list. The letters have been mistaken by some recipients as confirmation that they have been added to the voter list.

In the run-up to each federal election, the National Register of Electors undergoes a comprehensive revision process, running for 28 days starting on the 33rd day before the election. Each federal electoral district is responsible for revising the list of electors in that district. Targeted revision involves sending pairs of "revising agents" to certain areas such as new residential developments, areas known for high population mobility, student residences, nursing homes and chronic care facilities. Electors may also be revised by using mail-in forms, by visiting the returning office in that electoral district, or by registering on polling day.

== Provincial and territorial voter lists ==
Provincial agencies which maintain permanent lists of voters include those in British Columbia and Quebec. Residents of Ontario may opt to have their personal information in the Permanent Register of Electors for Ontario not be shared with Elections Canada for inclusion in the National Register of Electors. By 2000, Alberta, Ontario and Quebec had each conducted one election using a permanent voter register, Newfoundland and Labrador had established one, and New Brunswick had passed legislation to create one.

British Columbia's Election Act permits the provincial chief electoral officer to "register as voters those individuals who appear to be qualified to register as voters" and to "update current voter registration information" based on the National Register of Electors without the involvement of the individual. Data collected may be used in accordance with the Canada Elections Act. This is possible as a result of changes to the British Columbia Election Act made on 20 May 2004. Elections BC shares data with Elections Canada every six months. This coordination ensures that federally registered electors are also registered provincially, and vice versa. Because British Columbia has a six-month residency requirement for an individual to become a registered elector, a criterion not required for the national register, the provincial register will filter updates received from the National Register of Electors to exclude individuals that do not meet that criterion. Before synchronization with the National Register of Electors, the provincial voter list included 71 per cent of eligible electors; after the 2005 provincial election in May 2005, the first to use the synchronized system, it was expected to be 93 per cent, increasing voter registration from 2.11 million to 2.82 million electors from 2.98 million eligible resident citizens.

Elections Alberta signed an agreement with Elections Canada in October 2000 to share data stored in their respective register of electors, and received $750,000 as part of the contract. Despite the sharing agreement, Elections Alberta does not immediately integrate updates received from the National Register of Electors, as the provincial register includes only individuals who satisfy the "six-month residency requirement in the provincial legislation which is not reflected in the federal legislation", and thus excludes some electors from the national registry.

The Northwest Territories updates its voter list based on information in the National Register of Electors, as well as obtaining data from medical insurance data, the Student Financial Assistance program, and voter registration data held by municipal or Aboriginal governments.

As a result of changes to Nova Scotia's Elections Act, it first used the National Register of Electors in the 2003 general provincial election to elect members of the 59th General Assembly of Nova Scotia.

== Voting ==
For a Canadian federal general election, an individual may cast a ballot if the individual is a Canadian citizen, is at least 18 years old on the day of the election, and is registered to vote. The latter is satisfied by inclusion in the National Register of Electors, in which case Elections Canada will mail the elector a voter information card listing locations for advance polls and election day polls, or by independently registering for each election at an advance poll or election day poll.

A revision period beginning 33 days before an election and ending six days before the election enables eligible electors to update their names and addresses on the National Register of Electors, to add their names to it, and request deletion of deceased and other individuals not qualified to vote from the list. An elector may also "file an objection against another elector" by filing an "affidavit of objection with the returning officer" after the issue of writs until 14 days before an election to dispute the eligibility of that individual as an elector.

The National Register of Electors is used to produce "lists of electors for election and referendum purposes", and for by-elections. Elections Canada prepares the preliminary elector lists for every polling station of each electoral district based on address information contained in the National Register of Electors. During the election period, returning officers for each electoral district use the lists to revise information for eligible electors. The lists are also used by candidates during their campaign in the election period, and by Elections Canada to "calculate election expense limits for political parties and candidates".

The voter information card sent to each elector is meant to inform the elector of registration status, and to provide information about the location and date on which to cast a ballot.

== Audit ==
A November 2005 report by the auditor general of Canada stated that the data contained in the National Register of Electors as of May 2004 had "coverage rates of more than 95 percent and currency rates of more than 81 percent", exceeding the stated goal of 92 percent for coverage (the proportion of eligible voters who are included in the National Register of Electors) and 77 percent for currency (the proportion of all eligible voters whose address is correctly listed).

According to Elections Canada, from 1996 to 2008 the National Register of Electors allowed Elections Canada to avoid over $100 million in election-related expenditures. From 2000 to 2005, maintaining the National Register of Electors cost $19.4 million, and required 40 full-time employees. The system implemented by Elections Canada has been studied by other jurisdictions and agencies, including the Electoral Council of Australia (whose members include the Electoral Commissioners of the federal and state governments) in June 1999.

== National Geographic Database ==
Elections Canada and Statistics Canada used the National Register of Electors to generate the National Geographic Database (NGD), a spatial database which contains roads and related attributes such as road "name, type, direction, and address ranges", amongst other data. It was created in 1997, and built from 1998 to 2000 using road data from Elections Canada, street network files from Statistics Canada, the National Topographic Database from Natural Resources Canada, and data from the Digital Chart of the World. The cost to Elections Canada to contribute to the NGD was $3.6 million, and linking the National Register of Electors to the National Geographic Database cost $500,000.

Since 2001, data quality improvements focussing on road and address range currency has been the primary area of updates to the National Geographic Database. It is used by Elections Canada to generate electoral district maps, and by Statistics Canada for census activities. The maintenance costs from the 2000 federal election to 2005 was $16.6 million, requiring 34 full-time employees.

The National Geographic Database is used for electoral purposes to be "able to identify in which electoral district and in which polling division the elector's residence is located". An Electoral Geography Database which contains "the boundaries of the 308 electoral districts and about 58,000 polling divisions" is combined with the NGD to "produce the various maps and other geographic products required to support electoral events".
