= Haig v Canada (Chief Electoral Officer) =

Judgement of the Supreme Court of Canada

Haig v Canada (Chief Electoral Officer) [1993] 2 S.C.R. 995 is a leading Supreme Court of Canada decision on the protection of the right to vote under section 3 of the Canadian Charter of Rights and Freedoms.

== Background ==
Graham Haig had moved from Ontario to Quebec during the summer of 1992. As it happened, this was also the summer of the Charlottetown Accord where each citizen was given the opportunity to vote on whether to adopt the constitutional amendments. Due to his move he was ineligible to vote in either province. The Elections Act provided that the voter must reside in the district on the day of enumeration. For Quebec voters were required to live in the province for the last six months. On enumeration day he was in Quebec and thus was unable to vote.

In September Haig brought an application against the Queen and the Chief Electoral Officer for a declaration under section 3 of the Elections Act on the basis that his ineligibility was in violation of sections 2(b), 3, 6, and 15(1) of the Charter.

The Federal Court rejected the Charter claim which was upheld by the Federal Court of Appeal. Further the claim against the Queen was dropped.

The issues before the Supreme Court was:

1. Whether the exclusion of persons in Haig's position from voting in the referendum violate sections 2(b), 3 and 15(1) of the Charter.
2. Whether any violation can be saved under section 1.

== Opinion of the Court ==
The Court held that there were no violations of the Charter. L'Heureux-Dube J. wrote the majority, with La Forest, Sopinka, Gonthier, and Major JJ. concurring. Both Cory J. and Mclachlin J. wrote separate concurring opinions. Lamer C.J. and Iaccobucci J. each had separate dissenting opinions.
