= C76 =

C76 may refer to:

- Ruy Lopez chess openings ECO code
- Honda C71, C76, C72, C77 Dream, motorcycle different models
- Malignant neoplasm of other and ill-defined sites ICD-10 code
- HMS Newcastle (C76), a 1936 British Royal Navy cruiser
- Wages, Hours of Work and Manning (Sea) Convention, 1946 code
- Creative Technology Singapore Exchange code
- Scania-Vabis bus model
- C76 sound CPU in 1996 Namco arcade game system
- Caldwell 76 (NGC 6231), the "False Comet Cluster", an open cluster in the constellation Scorpius

C-76 may refer to:

- Curtiss-Wright C-76 Caravan, a 1943 military aircraft
- Elections Modernization Act in Canada, enacted as Bill C-76
