= Royal Commission on Electoral Reform and Party Financing =

- Also known as: Lortie Commission
- Commissioners: Pierre Lortie (Chair); Pierre Wilfrid Fortier; William Knight; Robert Thomas Gabor; Lucie Pépin
- Inquiry period: November 1989 – November 1991

The Royal Commission on Electoral Reform and Party Financing or RCERPF, also known as the Lortie Commission, was a Royal Commission established to investigate changes to Canadian election laws defined in the Canada Elections Act. The Royal Commission was appointed by the federal government in 1989 "to review, among other issues, the many anomalies identified by Charter challengers", particularly regarding restrictions in the Elections Act inconsistent with Section Three of the Canadian Charter of Rights and Freedoms.

It reported to the Cabinet of Canada in 1991, and made many recommendations. As a result, in 1992 Bill C-78 was passed, and in 1993 Bill C-114 was passed.

One of the recommendations was that "provincial (elector) lists be used for federal purposes". This led to the establishment of a working group in 1995, which in March 1996 submitted the report The Register of Electors Project: A Report on Research and feasibility to the chief electoral officer of Elections Canada. That report recommended the creation of the National Register of Electors, which was established when Bill C-63 was granted Royal Assent by Roméo LeBlanc, the Governor General of Canada, on 18 December 1996.

== See also ==
- List of Canadian Royal Commissions
