= Figueroa v Canada (AG) =

- Supreme Court of Canada

Hearing: November 5, 2002 Judgment: June 27, 2003
- Full case name: Miguel Figueroa v. Attorney General of Canada
- Citations: [2003] 1 S.C.R. 912, 2003 SCC 37
- Ruling: Figueroa appeal allowed

Court membership
- Chief Justice: Beverley McLachlin; Puisne Justices: Charles Gonthier, Frank Iacobucci, John C. Major, Michel Bastarache, Ian Binnie, Louise Arbour, Louis LeBel, Marie Deschamps

Reasons given
- Majority: Iacobucci J., joined by McLachlin C.J. and Major, Bastarache, Binnie and Arbour JJ.
- Concurrence: LeBel J., joined by Gonthier and Deschamps JJ.

Figueroa v Canada (AG) [2003] 1 S.C.R. 912, 2003 SCC 37 is a leading Supreme Court of Canada decision on the right to participate in a federal election under section 3 of the Canadian Charter of Rights and Freedoms. The Court struck down provisions requiring a political party to nominate 50 candidates before receiving certain benefits.

== Background ==
Miguel Figueroa, the leader of the Communist Party of Canada, challenged the constitutionality of sections 24(2), 24(3) and 28(2) of the Canada Elections Act providing for a 50 candidate threshold as a violation of Section Three of the Canadian Charter of Rights and Freedoms.

The court challenge originated after the 1993 general federal election when the CPC failed to field at least 50 candidates. Under the then Canada Elections Act, which had been amended just prior to the 1993 vote by the former Conservative government of Brian Mulroney, a registered federal party that fails to run at least 50 candidates in a general election would not only be automatically de-registered but would also be stripped of its net assets which would then be turned over to the Government of Canada.

Later that year, Miguel Figueroa, acting on behalf of the Communist Party's membership, challenged these provisions in the Act, arguing that the 50-candidate rule, combined with the increase in candidate deposits—which for smaller parties would be only partially refundable—and the seizure of party assets, together constituted draconian and unfair discrimination against smaller political parties. In 1999, Justice Anne Molloy of the Court of Ontario (General Division) (now named the Superior Court of Justice) struck down many of the Act's provisions as unconstitutional, including the seizure of party assets and the non-refundability of candidate deposits for those failing to garner at least 15% of the vote in an election. Justice Molloy also struck down the 50-candidate threshold requirement for federal parties to maintain their registration.

The Attorney-General, on behalf of the Government of Canada, did not appeal the Molloy rulings on the seizure of assets and the non-refundability of candidate's deposits; these sections of the Canada Elections Act were subsequently changed by the Parliament of Canada.

However, the A-G did appeal Molloy's decision striking down the 50-candidate threshold rule. The case then proceeded to the Ontario Court of Appeal. In 2001, the Court of Appeal rendered a split decision, holding that while in its opinion the 50-candidate rule itself was constitutional, it was unconstitutional to fail to provide the party identifier on the ballot, as this denied important information about candidates to electors when completing their ballot. The Court instructed Parliament to establish a lower threshold in such cases. Following this ruling, Parliament again amended the Act to set a 12-candidate threshold for the party identifier, meaning that parties fielding at least 12 candidates in a general election would have the party name included on the ballot next to their candidates names.

Figueroa, represented by Peter Rosenthal, then sought to appeal this judgment to the Supreme Court of Canada, arguing that the ruling of the Ontario Court of Appeal was flawed in interpreting the Charter of Rights and Freedoms, and that the 50-candidate rule did in fact constitute discrimination against smaller parties under the Charter. The Supreme Court of Canada (SCC) granted leave to appeal, and the case was argued before the SCC in 2002.

== Opinion of the court ==
Justice Iacobucci, writing for the majority, stated that section 3 protects not just the right to vote but also provides the right of every citizen to participate in politics. The right ensures that each citizen can express an opinion about the formation of the country's public policy and the country's institutions. However, Iacobucci noted that section 3 does not protect unlimited participation. Rather it protects:

the right of each citizen to play a meaningful role in the process; the mere fact that the legislation departs from absolute voter equality or restricts the capacity of a citizen to participate in the electoral process is an insufficient basis on which to conclude that it interferes with the right of each citizen to play a meaningful role in the electoral process.

For a violation to be found there must be a prohibition against "meaningful" participation.

== See also ==
- List of Supreme Court of Canada cases (McLachlin Court)
