= R v Bryan =

- Supreme Court of Canada

Hearing: October 16, 2006 Judgment: March 15, 2007
- Full case name: Paul Charles Bryan v. Her Majesty the Queen and Attorney General of Canada
- Citations: 2007 SCC 12, [2007] 1 S.C.R. 527
- Docket No.: 31052
- Prior history: Judgment for the Crown and the Attorney General of Canada in the British Columbia Court of Appeal.
- Ruling: Appeal dismissed.

Holding
- Section 329 of the Canada Elections Act is constitutional and justified under section 1 of the Canadian Charter of Rights and Freedoms.

Court membership
- Chief Justice: Beverley McLachlin; Puisne Justices: Michel Bastarache, Ian Binnie, Louis LeBel, Marie Deschamps, Morris Fish, Rosalie Abella, Louise Charron, Marshall Rothstein

Reasons given
- Majority: Bastarache J. (paras. 1-53)
- Concurrence: Fish J. (paras. 54-82)
- Concurrence: Deschamps, Charron and Rothstein JJ. (para. 83)
- Dissent: Abella J. (paras. 84-134), joined by McLachlin C.J., and Binnie and LeBel JJ.

R v Bryan [2007] 1 S.C.R. 527, 2007 SCC 12 is a decision by the Supreme Court of Canada on freedom of expression and Canadian federal elections. The Court upheld a law that prevented the publicizing of election results from some ridings before the polls closed in others.

The law was later repealed by a vote in parliament, taking effect June 18, 2014 prior to the 2015 Canadian federal election, citing the increased use of social media.

== Background ==
Section 329 of the Canada Elections Act outlawed publishing election results from other ridings in constituencies where polls were still open. However, in the federal election in 2000, one Paul Charles Bryan published results from Atlantic Canada on the Internet despite being told not to by the authorities. Bryan was charged before the Provincial Court of British Columbia, but fought the charges as unconstitutional under section 2 of the Canadian Charter of Rights and Freedoms, which protects freedom of expression and freedom of association. Bryan's victory before the British Columbia Supreme Court meant that voters in British Columbia legally learned of election results in other ridings during the federal election in 2004. However, Bryan lost his case before the British Columbia Court of Appeal.

Stephen Harper, who later became prime minister, labelled Elections Canada "jackasses" and tried to raise money for Bryan. The Canadian Broadcasting Corporation also supported Bryan, hoping to "make election night a bigger event that [sic] it already is."

== Decision ==
The majority of the Court produced three opinions upholding the law, one by Justice Bastarache and one by Justice Fish, with the remaining three judges writing a brief opinion of agreement.

=== Bastarache ===
Justice Bastarache pointed to the Supreme Court case Harper v. Canada (Attorney General) (2004), which had also considered the Canada Elections Act. The Harper decision stated that the Court should be deferential to the government with respect to election legislation, and that the Court should consider the context of the law, citing Thomson Newspapers Co. v. Canada (Attorney General) (1998) to say that this involves considering why someone guarded by the law is at risk and why someone would perceive oneself to be at risk. In this case, Bastarache found the purpose of section 329 was to promote the idea of each voter in Canada knowing as much as each other, as it may be unfair if some voters already know election results in other ridings while earlier voters do not know of any outcomes. This idea of section 329 would also build public trust in elections. Bastarache felt that voters aware of some results may base their own choices on that knowledge, and Bastarache recognized without demand for much proof that it is a principle of democracy that a person cannot base their choice in voting on special knowledge. In this case, Bastarache did not really emphasize the idea that Canadian voters from Western Canada were at risk of being swayed by special knowledge, saying that Canadian voters should be trusted to have some "maturity and intelligence." Instead, Bastarache said what was at stake was the view that Canadian elections are fair, and pointed to polls to reinforce this idea.

On the topic of freedom of expression, Bastarache questioned the value of spreading election results, and said that there was no evidence this could outweigh the principles of democracy of section 329. On whether a violation of freedom of expression could be justified under section 1 of the Charter, Bastarache found that fairness in elections should be a sufficient objective of the law, as should building public trust in elections. Additionally, banning the publishing of election results was needed to achieve this objective, and Parliament considered this to be the best method.

=== Fish ===
Justice Fish states election results from other ridings should not be published in a riding before its polls close so voters can vote without knowing how other voters have voted. Fish says section 329 of the Canada Elections Act does violate section 2(b) of the Charter of Rights for a short while, but section 329 is constitutional because it "relates to a pressing and substantial concern in a free and democratic society", thus satisfying one part of section 1 of the Charter which can limit the rights of Canadians. Section 329 is also constitutional because according to Fish, the court is dealing with "an important element of Canada’s electoral system" so section 1 of the Charter of Rights can be invoked. Fish refers to both a Royal Commission on Electoral Reform and Party Financing publication and a 2005 joint Decima Research-Carleton University Poll; both state Canadians do not want to know election results before their polls close. Fish believes even if there is no harm in releasing results early, the information release would create a "perception" of unfairness, which in itself is a problem.

== Dissent ==
Per McLachlin C.J. and Binnie, LeBel and Abella JJ: The s 329 publication ban is an excessive response to an insufficiently proven harm and a violation of s 2(b) of the Charter that cannot be justified under s 1. The government's s 1 justification falters fatally in its submission that the benefits of the limitation on the freedom of expression are proportional to its harmful effects. Here, when the harm at which the blackout period in s 329 is aimed is considered in the context of staggered hours, there is only speculative and unpersuasive evidence to support the government's claim that the information imbalance is of sufficient harm to voter behaviour or perceptions of electoral unfairness that it outweighs any damage done to a fundamental and constitutional protected right.

== See also ==
- List of Supreme Court of Canada cases (McLachlin Court)
