= Reference re Provincial Electoral Boundaries (Sask) =

Reference Re Provincial Electoral Boundaries (Sask)
- Supreme Court of Canada

Hearing: April 29, 30, 1991 Judgment: June 6, 1991
- Full case name: The Attorney General for Saskatchewan v Roger Carter, QC
- Citations: [1991] 2 S.C.R. 158
- Prior history: Appeal from Saskatchewan Court of Appeal
- Ruling: Sask. appeal allowed

Court membership
- Chief Justice: Antonio Lamer; Puisne Justices: Bertha Wilson, Gérard La Forest, Claire L'Heureux-Dubé, John Sopinka, Charles Gonthier, Peter Cory, Beverley McLachlin, William Stevenson

Reasons given
- Majority: McLachlin J., joined by La Forest, Gonthier, Stevenson and Iacobucci JJ.
- Concurrence: Sopinka J.
- Dissent: Cory J., joined by Lamer C.J. and L'Heureux-Dubé J.

Reference Re Provincial Electoral Boundaries (Sask), [1991] 2 S.C.R. 158 is a landmark decision of the Supreme Court of Canada on the right to vote under section 3 of the Canadian Charter of Rights and Freedoms. The Court rejected the US principle of "one man, one vote" from the US Supreme Court decision of Baker v. Carr (1962), and instead held that the right to vote meant "effective representation".

== Background ==
The government of Saskatchewan passed a law establishing a commission to revise the provincial electoral boundaries. The Act created a quota for rural and urban constituencies, and required that the boundaries conform with the existing municipal boundaries. Consequently, the degree of representation between the districts varied between 15 and 25%.

== Opinion of the Court ==
Justice McLachlin, writing for the majority, held that the deviation between districts did not violate section 3 of the Charter. She stated that "the purpose of the right to vote in section 3 of the Canadian Charter of Rights and Freedoms is not equality of voting power but the right to 'effective representation'. Our democracy is a representative democracy. Each citizen has the right to be represented within the governmental edifice." However, the decision also meant that constituencies should have a reasonably similar number of voters for the representation to be effective; room for disproportionality was allowed due to geographical limits in drawing boundaries and to give minorities more representation within a constituency.

Justice Cory, writing in dissent, held that the provincial government should not be able to impose restrictions on boundaries revision committee, and accordingly, there should be a violation of section 3 of the Charter.

== See also ==
- List of Supreme Court of Canada cases (Lamer Court)
