= International Register of Electors =

Canadian voter database

The International Register of Electors is a database of eligible electors for federal elections in Canada who reside outside Canada. It is maintained by Elections Canada, which also maintains the National Register of Electors.

== Voter registration ==
A Canadian citizen who is resident outside the country may submit an application to Elections Canada either online, by fax, or by mail or courier service. The applicant must be a Canadian citizen and at least 18 years old on polling day. The application must include the last residential address of the applicant before departing Canada, and proof of identity.

Once the application is approved, the elector will be added to the International Register of Electors and become eligible to vote for elections in the electoral district of their last Canadian address. The individual is notified by Elections Canada about inclusion in the register.

Before 2019, eligibility expired for expatriate Canadians once they resided outside the country more than five years. With the grant of royal assent to the Elections Modernization Act of 2019, this condition was eliminated, and any citizen living abroad more than five years were also qualified to cast ballots.

== Voting ==
When an election is called, those entered into the International Register of Electors will be sent a voting kit for that election that contains a ballot, voting instructions, a prepaid return envelope to the Elections Canada Ottawa office, an outer (electoral riding) envelope, and an inner (voting) envelope. Elections Canada does not maintain offices outside Canada, and voting kits and polling stations are not available at embassies, consulates, or high commissions.

The completed ballot is enclosed in the blank inner envelope, which is then sealed and enclosed in the outer envelope on which is printed the elector's name and electoral riding. This is sealed and signed, then enclosed within the prepaid return envelope. The purpose of this system is to ensure vote secrecy. The elector must ensure the ballot arrives at Elections Canada Ottawa office by the stated date. Late ballots, and those with unsigned declarations (on the outer voting envelope), will not be counted.

== Legacy ==
In 2015, there were 44,843 individuals recorded in the International Register of Electors. In 2019, there were 83,774. of which 34,144 cast a ballot in the 2019 Canadian federal election. In comparison with other government services, 235,686 Canadian citizens declared being abroad to Global Affairs Canada in 2019, and about 240,000 passports and travel documents are issued to Canadian citizens abroad annually. A 2022 Statistics Canada report estimated the Canadian diaspora of citizens living abroad (including children) at 4 million in 2016, or 12.6% of the population.

== See also ==
- Frank v Canada (AG)
