= Fair Elections Act =

Canadian statute regulating elections

House of Commons of Canada
- Long title: An Act to amend the Canada Elections Act and other Acts and to make consequential amendments to certain Acts
- Citation: SC 2014, c. 12
- Enacted by: House of Commons of Canada
- Enacted by: Senate of Canada
- Royal assent: June 19, 2014

Legislative history

Initiating chamber: House of Commons of Canada
- Bill title: Bill C-23
- Introduced by: Minister Pierre Poilievre
- First reading: February 4, 2014
- Second reading: February 10, 2014
- Third reading: May 12, 2014

Revising chamber: Senate of Canada
- Bill title: Bill C-23
- First reading: May 14, 2014
- Second reading: May 29, 2014
- Third reading: June 12, 2014
- Status: Amended

The Fair Elections Act (French: Loi sur l’intégrité des élections) is a statute enacted by the Conservative government in the 41st Canadian Parliament. It was introduced on February 4, 2014, by Minister of Democratic Reform Pierre Poilievre, was sent to the Senate with amendments on May 12, 2014, and received royal assent on June 19, 2014.

Many of the amendments made by this Act were subsequently repealed by the Liberal ministry of Justin Trudeau prior to the 2019 general election.

== Bill proposals ==
The Fair Elections Act was announced as implementing 38 recommendations of the Chief Electoral Officer. However, in his testimony to the House of Commons Standing Committee on Procedure and House Affairs, the Chief Electoral Officer stated that the bill contains measures that "undermine its stated purpose and will not serve Canadians well". The government broke the bill into eight broad changes to the Canada Elections Act and other acts and regulations surrounding federal elections in Canada. The bill would do the following:

1. Create a mandatory public registry for political parties that engage in mass-calling, and increases penalties for individuals found guilty of impersonating elections officials or tampering with an election. This is a response to the claims of fraudulent calls being made during the 2011 federal election.
2. Give the Commissioner of Canada Elections more freedom and independence in seeking tougher penalties for those found to be interfering with elections. It also prohibits 12 new elections offences. Finally, the Fair Elections Act moves the Commissioner of Canada Elections from reporting to the Chief Electoral Officer to reporting to the Director of Public Prosecutions.
3. Eliminate the use of vouching and Voter Information Cards as a form of ID.
4. Give political parties the right to receive "advance rulings and interpretations" from Elections Canada within 45 days of making the request. This is to allow political parties to consult with Elections Canada for advice and clarification before they try to implement something.
5. Ban the use of loans to evade donation limit laws. This is a response to Liberal Party of Canada leadership contenders who, in 2006 for example, received "loans" from individuals that would have exceeded the donation limit, but were ruled as legal because the loans would eventually be paid back. However, as of 2014, several leadership contestants still owe money. The bill increases the annual donation limit from $1200 to $1500 per calendar year and raises election spending limits by five percent. The bans against corporate and union donations, as brought in by the Conservative government's Accountability Act in 2006 remain in effect.
6. Allow a Member of Parliament whose elections results are being contested by the Chief Electoral Officer to remain as a sitting Member of Parliament until that dispute is resolved.
7. Repeal the ban on the premature transmission of elections results. The rationale for the ban was that, due to Canada's large geographic size, different time zones would still be voting while others would have already been closed. According to the rationale, a voter in British Columbia could be discouraged from voting if they already know the election results in Ontario. The Supreme Court of Canada unanimously agreed that such a ban infringes on freedom of expression.
8. Propose "better customer service" by re-focusing the mandate of Elections Canada by requiring that it remains focused on "the basics of voting: where, when, and what ID to bring." Another part is adding an extra day of advance polling, giving Canadians a total of four advance polling days - on the tenth, ninth, eighth, and seventh days before Election Day.

== Public response ==
A March 2014 poll conducted by EKOS Research claimed that Canadians were "shrugging off" the bill and that it was failing to make an impact outside of the "Ottawa bubble."

A March 2014 Angus Reid poll found that the less Canadians knew about the bill, the more likely they were to support it.

An April 2014 Ipsos Reid poll found that 87 percent of Canadians believe identification and proof of address should have to be presented in order to vote. Of those 87 percent, 52 percent said they did not "care if those requirements made voting difficult for some."

In response to claims that the Conservatives were using the Fair Elections Act to "cheat the system", an April 2014 CTV News poll found that 61 percent did not believe this to be the case.

An April 2014 Angus Reid poll found that "sound does not necessarily equal fury," noting that, despite constant media coverage and Opposition complaints, public opinion had only changed two percentage points, and remained basically neutral between support or opposition for the bill. However, Angus Reid notes that "awareness is slowly growing and that opposition among those who are aware of the changes is also growing". Of those "very familiar" with the act, 59% oppose it.

== Elections Canada response ==
In October 2013, Chief Electoral Officer Marc Mayrand established an advisory board to advise him "on matters relating to Canada's electoral system, its voting processes, and support for a vigorous democracy that reflects our constitution, deeply held values, and the evolving needs and circumstances of Canadians." With the introduction of the Fair Elections Act, the advisory board, its role, its budget of $439,333, and its expertise were put under scrutiny. The panel included Sheila Fraser, Ian Binnie, John Manley, Preston Manning, Bob Rae, and Hugh Segal.

== Criticism ==
On April 16, 2014, Jeffrey Simpson, writing for the Globe and Mail, claimed the Act demonstrated a "them-against-us" mentality in the Conservative government fighting against Elections Canada.

In doing a "pre-study" of the Fair Elections Act, the Senate committee on Legal and Constitutional Affairs recommended that nine amendments be made to the Act.

On April 25, 2014, Minister Poilievre submitted a number of amendments to the Committee in response to criticism of aspects of the bill. The Globe and Mail summarized the elements of the bill generating controversy:

=== Elimination of vouching ===
Vouching is the practice of allowing a voter with proper identification to vouch for the identity of another individual who lives in the same polling area. This allows for circumstances in which someone may have moved shortly before an election and does not yet have identification showing the new address, or people who do not have driver's licenses. Approximately 120,000 voters in the 2011 general election used vouching. While there have been issues noted with the record keeping on vouching, there is no record of vouching resulting in someone voting improperly. While some challenged the need for eliminating vouching, the Conservatives pointed out that Elections Canada recognizes 39 types of identification. The amendments to the bill proposed by the Conservatives on April 25 modified this provision to allow a voter with identification to sign a written oath of their residence and have that co-signed by another voter with fully proven ID. This process, for example, would allow an aboriginal with a status Indian card, which does not list address, to use that ID and sign an oath regarding their residency.

=== Exempting fundraising costs related to previous donors ===
The bill would exempt from campaign spending limits the costs of fundraising efforts directed at people who had donated $20 or more in the previous five years. This would have allowed parties to spend unlimited funds on soliciting the renewal of support from past supporters. A concern was this would provide additional benefit to the party with the largest current support base, which is currently the Conservatives. The amendments announced by the Conservatives on April 25 removed this provision.

=== Restrictions to communications from the Chief Electoral Officer ===
The bill placed restrictions on what the Chief Electoral Officer (CEO) can say publicly, in particular, the CEO would not have been allowed to encourage people to vote – only to give technical information on how to vote. The Conservatives argued that it is the job of political parties to get people to vote, but other groups note that broadly encouraging people to participate in voting is a legitimate role of the CEO, particularly in light of declining voter turnout. This provision in the bill would likely have ended Elections Canada supported programs such as Student Vote, an initiative to boost civic literacy in children. The amendments announced by the Conservatives on April 25 were described as removing restrictions on what the CEO can communicate, but not the limitations on funding voter participation programs.

=== Transferring investigative power to the Director of Public Prosecutions ===
The Commissioner of Canada Elections is the top investigative official for possible irregularities in campaigning and carrying out of elections. The bill would transfer the Commissioner from reporting to the Chief Electoral Officer to reporting to the Director of Public Prosecutions. The current Commissioner, Yves Côté, has said the move is "not a step in the right direction" and that he has a "deep concern" with proposals to limit what he can say publicly. The current Chief Electoral Officer has warned that this provision needs rules guaranteeing the CEO and the Commissioner can still share information.

=== Restrictions on the amount of political advertising between elections ===
The previous rules restricted to $200,001 the amount any group can spend on political advertising during a political campaign. Under the new bill, this would become the limit on spending in relation to an election, limiting the total spending on political communications in the four to five years between elections. While Democracy Watch noted this restriction would likely be struck down by a court, it was accused of putting a chill on groups that might otherwise carry out communications before the next election in 2015.

=== Changes to the appointment of poll supervisors ===
The bill would require the central poll supervisor (the person in charge of a particular polling station) to be appointed from a list of individuals provided by the candidate of the party that won that riding in the previous election. Although the bill allows the returning offer to refuse such appointments "on reasonable grounds" it does not define what qualifies as reasonable grounds. The amendments announced by the Conservatives on April 25 were described as maintaining Elections Canada's discretion in appointing central poll supervisors.

== Supporters and opponents ==
=== Supporters ===
==== Academics ====
Carleton University public policy professor Ian Lee supported the Fair Elections Act.

==== Elections experts ====
Although he later changed his mind, Jean-Pierre Kingsley, the former Chief Electoral Officer, gave the Fair Elections Act an A minus. He said he would have liked to see tougher fines, but said, overall, it was a "good bill."

==== Media members ====
On April 10, 2014, Sun Media columnist Ezra Levant claimed most of the Fair Elections Act was administrative in nature, and that eliminating the use of vouching was perfectly reasonable.

On April 13, 2014, Huffington Post Canada columnist J.J. McCullough said he supported the bill and that Chief Electoral Officer Marc Mayrand had a vested interest in defending his organization's mandate, staff, and budget.

==== Conservative members ====
- Costas Menegakis
- Steven Fletcher
- Gordon O'Connor
- Chris Warkentin
- Larry Miller
- Bob Dechert
- Greg Rickford

On March 24, 2014, the minister who introduced the bill, Pierre Poilievre, wrote an editorial for The Globe and Mail on why the Fair Elections Act was "in fact, fair."

On April 15, 2014, Conservative MP James Rajotte said that while he personally supported the Fair Elections Act, he had been getting a lot of feedback from his constituents, "including the curtailing of vouching, an expense exemption for calls to donors who've previously donated money to a political party, partisan appointments of polling day officials and the curbing of the ability of Elections Canada to attempt to increase voter turnout."

=== Opponents ===
==== Academics ====
One hundred and sixty professors signed a National Post editorial that stated "if passed", the Fair Elections Act "would damage the institution at the heart of our country's democracy: voting in federal elections."

==== Media members ====
Postmedia News listed nine newspapers which opposed the Fair Elections Act and called for a "national conversation" on what should be implemented. They include:

- Ottawa Citizen
- Montreal Gazette
- Calgary Herald
- Vancouver Sun
- Edmonton Journal
- Saskatoon StarPhoenix

The Globe and Mail editorial board wrote a series of five editorials critical of the Act, and called for it to be killed altogether.

==== Political leaders ====
On April 9, 2014, Liberal Party of Canada leader Justin Trudeau said he would repeal the Fair Elections Act if elected Prime Minister.

==== Elections experts ====
Elections Canada Chief Electoral Officer Marc Mayrand came out strongly against the proposed legislation. However, the appropriateness of his comments, and even his right to make critical comments on proposed legislation were challenged by others. Conservative MP Tom Lukiwski accused Mayrand of political activism, and of giving a "campaign-style speech" to Elections Canada staff in order to stir up dissent and opposition to the bill. Ezra Levant stated that never before has a public servant, whose job is to remain neutral and implement government directives, gone on the offensive in publicly attacking a proposed government policy. Conservative Senator Linda Frum claimed Mayrand was in a conflict of interest by being allowed to run "Get out the Vote" initiatives in order to increase voter turnout and in having a vested interest in seeing voter turnout rise. The Fair Elections Act provision to re-focus Elections Canada's mandate, was interpreted as an effort to eliminate the Get out the Vote campaigns.

Although he was initially in favour of the Fair Elections Act, former Elections Canada CEO Jean-Pierre Kingsley later commented that a subsequent change to the act to abolish the process of vouching "will impact very negatively on the values of participation, impartiality and transparency" and "will directly affect the constitutional right to vote of a significant number of Canadians without justification." Kingsley also disagreed with a provision in the Bill that would allow parties to exclude from limits on campaign spending any money spent to raise donations from people who donated $20 or more in the previous five years. He said that this exempted fundraising activity would effectively be advertising and that the exemption would favour larger parties.

Democracy Watch, a non-profit organization, was against the Fair Elections Act. It laid out its opposition in the Globe and Mail on April 7, 2014 and also in a news release and submission to the House of Commons committee reviewing the bill on April 8, 2014.

== Subsequent developments ==
Consistent with their promise, the Trudeau Ministry, which had been elected in the 2015 federal election, unveiled Bill C-33, later replaced by Bill C-76, which was enacted as the Elections Modernization Act. That Act repealed many provisions of the Fair Elections Act.
