= Elections NWT =

Agency overview
- Formed: 1997
- Type: Department responsible for elections and plebiscites
- Jurisdiction: Northwest Territories
- Agency executive: Stephen Dunbar, Chief Electoral Officer
- Website: www.electionsnwt.ca

Elections NWT (French: Élections TNO) is an independent, non-partisan public agency responsible for the administration of territorial general elections, by-elections, and plebiscites in accordance with the Elections and Plebiscites Act. Elections NWT is headed by the chief electoral officer, an officer of the Legislative Assembly of the Northwest Territories.

Responsibility for the management of territorial elections was devolved to Elections NWT from Elections Canada in 1997.

== Early history ==
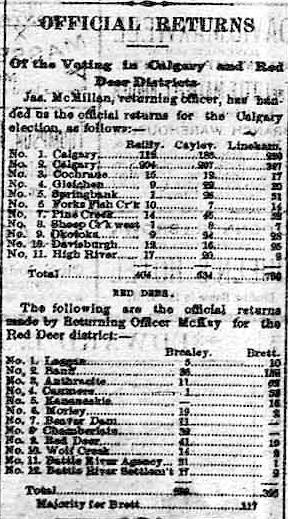
Official results published in the Calgary Tribune on July 4, 1888. The results were only published in local newspapers and not compiled into an official publication.

The first provisions in legislation regarding the oversight of Northwest Territories elections was adopted in 1880 with an amendment to the Northwest Territories Act passed by the Parliament of Canada. The first election legislation was known as Section 15 under the act.

The election legislation established basic parameters for the creation of electoral districts, eligibility of electors and how the ballot casting process was to be conducted. Oversight was held by the lieutenant governor of the North-West Territories to royally proclaim electoral district boundaries on the formula of 1000 electors per 2,600 square kilometres (1,000 sq mi). Other responsibilities included issuing writs and appointing chief returning officers to oversee each election.

The first legislation passed by the Northwest Territories Legislative Assembly regarding election administration was An Ordinance respecting controverted elections. This piece of legislation was given royal assent on August 6, 1884. The ordinance was put in place to deal with potentially corrupt electoral practices. The ordinance required a valid elector to petition the lieutenant governor, with an affidavit stating the offence and a fee of $10.00 Canadian dollars to be presented within two months of the writ being returned.

In 1888, the lieutenant governor ceded his powers of electoral district creation. The powers instead came under federal control with the passage of the North-West Representation Act through the Parliament of Canada. The formula for representation of the electoral districts was revised to 2500 electors per district and no size restriction. The first comprehensive legislation detailing electoral procedures was passed by the Legislative Assembly, An Ordinance respecting Elections to the North-West Legislative Assembly, was given royal assent on December 31, 1892. This legislation formed the basis of electoral law that is in current use today in the territories as well as Saskatchewan and Alberta.

From 1881 until 1905, the chief returning officer for each electoral district was responsible for certifying returns and publishing them in local journals of records. No official publications on election wide statistics and returns were compiled into a single source until the resumption of elections in 1951.

== Chief Electoral Officer of Canada ==
In 1905, the populated regions of the Northwest Territories were carved out to form Alberta and Saskatchewan. The territorial government was reduced to an appointed council, and the lieutenant governor replaced by a commissioner. The council and commissioner were moved by the federal government to the nation's capital, Ottawa, Ontario. Another general election was not held for 46 years. An elections ordinance was introduced in 1951 that, among other changes enfranchised women. The Office of the Chief Electoral Officer of Canada then oversaw territorial elections. Revision of territorial electoral districts remained subject to an act of the Parliament of Canada.

== Establishment of Elections NWT ==
The Northwest Territories Legislature passed an amended Elections Act in the 10th Legislative Assembly in 1987 to create an independent agency to oversee elections. The agency was intended to run the 1991 Northwest Territories general election but was not ready in time. Elections Canada continued to run elections in the territory until 1997, with the last general election under federal authority occurring in 1995.

Elections NWT was supposed to take full control of election regulation in time for the 1995 Northwest Territories general election. Among other issues, lack of funding prevented the legislative assembly from appointing a resident chief electoral officer.

Instead, the 1995 general election was run by Elections Canada. Jean-Pierre Kingsley served as the chief electoral officer to oversee electoral operations and resident staff. Elections Canada was also responsible for publishing reports and returns related to the election.

== Nunavut ==
On April 1, 1999, the territory of Nunavut was carved out of the eastern portion of the Northwest Territories. A general election was called to elect members to the Legislative Assembly of Nunavut.

Elections NWT was mandated to oversee the first Nunavut general election because an agency had not yet been created in the new territory, and the election laws of the Northwest Territories were still in use. The agency also ran Nunavut's first by-election held in the electoral district of Quttiktuq on December 4, 2000.

After the general election, David Hamilton, the chief electoral officer at the time, recommended the creation of a similar non-partisan agency for Nunavut. This recommendation helped to establish Elections Nunavut. The recommendations were subsequently adopted.

== Recent developments ==
Amendments to the Elections and Plebiscites Act in 2010 introduced voter identification requirements into territorial elections.

Amendments in early 2007 entrenched fixed election dates into law and gave the chief electoral officer the power to issue writs on order of the commissioner of the Northwest Territories. The move towards fixed election dates followed a Canada-wide trend but also avoided the next election being held in December, in conflict with scheduled municipal elections as well as the darkest and coldest day of winter.
