= Section 3 of the Canadian Charter of Rights and Freedoms =

Constitutional provision guaranteeing suffrage

Section 3 of the Canadian Charter of Rights and Freedoms constitutionally guarantees Canadian citizens the right to vote for a federal and provincial representative and the right to be eligible for membership in the House of Commons or of a provincial legislature. The rights provided under section 3 of the Charter may be subject to reasonable limits under Section 1 of the Charter.

Section 3 is one of the provisions in the Charter that cannot be overridden by Parliament or a legislative assembly under Section 33 of the Charter, the notwithstanding clause. Section 3's exemption from Section 33 provides extra legal protection to the right to vote and it may prevent Parliament or the provincial governments from disenfranchising any Canadian citizen for ideological or political purposes, among others.

Section 3 has been interpreted by the Supreme Court of Canada to strike down legislation preventing prisoners, persons in mental institutions, and non-resident Canadians from voting.

== Text ==
Under the heading "Democratic Rights," the section reads:

3. Every citizen of Canada has the right to vote in an election of the members of the House of Commons or of a legislative assembly and to be qualified for membership therein.

== History ==
No formal right to vote existed in Canada before the adoption of the Charter. There was no such right, for example, in the Canadian Bill of Rights. Indeed, in the case Cunningham v Homma (1903), it was found that the government could legally deny the vote to Japanese Canadians and Chinese Canadians (although both groups would go on to achieve the franchise before section 3 came into force).

== Interpretation ==
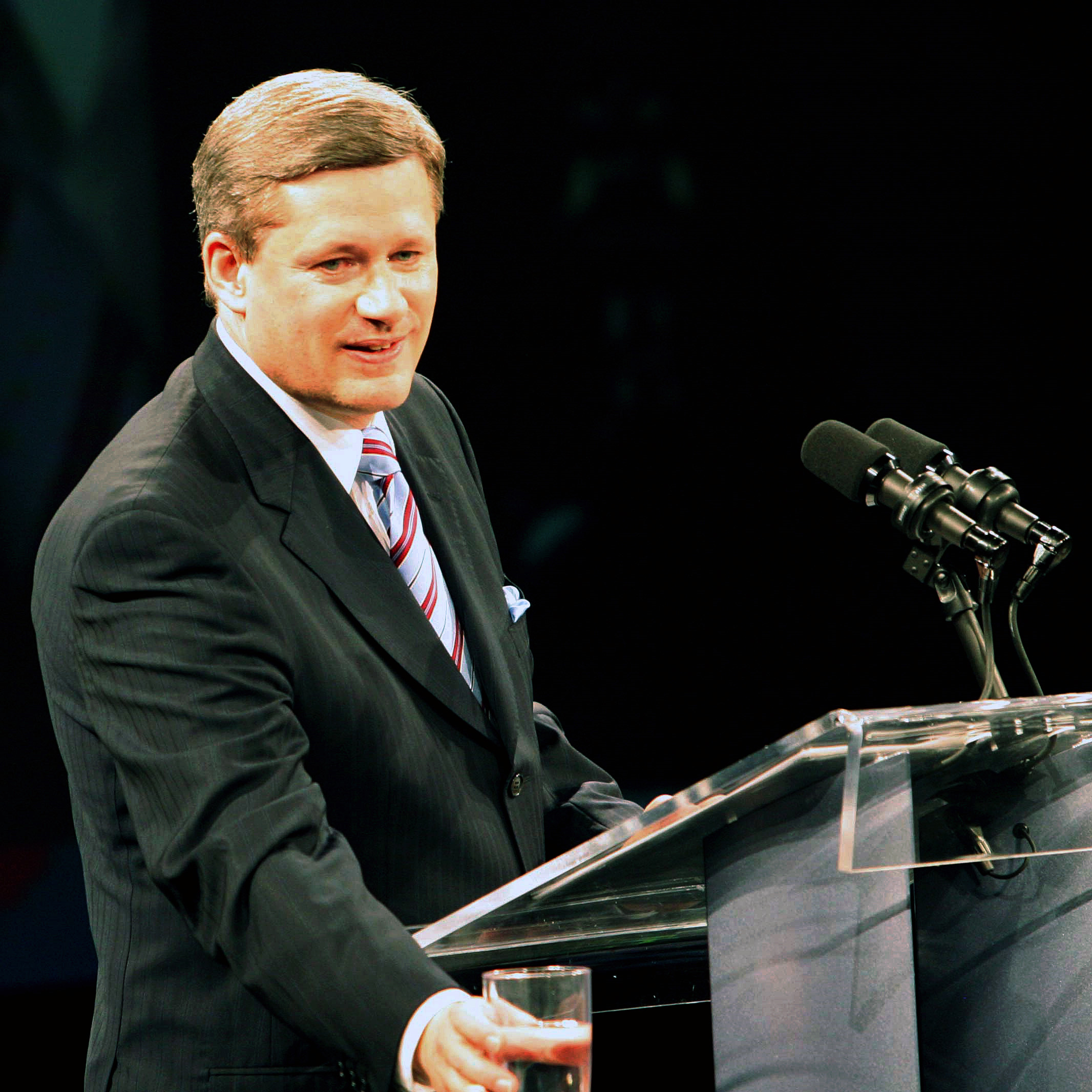
Stephen Harper, who as leader of the National Citizens Coalition challenged limits on campaign spending in Harper v Canada, and as leader of the Conservative Party of Canada opposed prisoners' voting rights after Sauvé v Canada.

=== Voting ===
The section has generated some case law expanding the franchise. In 1988, section 3 had been used to grant suffrage to federal judges and those in mental institutions. A more controversial example is Sauvé v. Canada (2002), in which it was found that prisoners could vote. They did so in the 2004 federal election, despite public opposition from Conservative leader Stephen Harper.

In the 2002 case Fitzgerald v. Alberta, the Court of Queen's Bench of Alberta found that although a minimum voting age of 18 violated section 3 of the Charter, it was justifiable under section 1 of the Charter. The decision was upheld upon appeal.

=== Candidate Requirements ===
Section 3 of the Charter provides the right to citizens of Canada to be qualified for membership in the House of Commons. In the 1996 case Harvey v New Brunswick (Attorney General), the Supreme Court of Canada held that section 3 provides the right to be a candidate and the right to sit as a member of Parliament or a legislature. Fred Harvey, a member of the New Brunswick Legislature was convicted of illegal practice, and contested his subsequent disqualification from the legislature under section 119 of the Elections Act. The six member majority for the Supreme Court held the provision violated section 3 of the Charter, but the violation was justified as a reasonable limit under section 1 of the Charter as it furthered the objective of preserving the integrity of the election process.

In Figueroa v Canada (AG) the court determined that Section 3 explicitly grants both the right to vote and the right to run for office to all Canadian citizens. In Szuchewycz v. Canada the Court of Queen's Bench of Alberta found that the $1000 federal candidate deposit requirement violated Section 3 and could not be justified under Section 1. Justice Inglis noted in paragraph 59 "I agree that the potential to prevent a serious and impressive candidate from running in an election, due to the financial pressure a $1000 deposit could create, is a real risk of the requirement. In my opinion, the impugned Deposit Requirement Provision would infringe many individuals’ – including the Applicant's – ability to communicate their messages to the public, and participate meaningfully in the electoral process as a candidate."

=== Electoral participation and political spending ===
Generally, the courts have interpreted section 3 as being more generous than simply providing a right to vote. As stated in the case Figueroa v. Canada (2003), the section has been viewed as a constitutional guarantee to "play a meaningful role in the electoral process," which in turn encourages governmental "respect for a diversity of beliefs and opinions." This does not mean, however, that interest groups have complete freedom to promote their beliefs and opinions. Since the voter must have an opportunity to balance various ideas in his or her own mind before meaningfully participating in an election, the Supreme Court has, in the case Harper v. Canada (Attorney General) (2004), upheld laws that limit the amount of money a single group can contribute in the election (to prevent a monopolization of the campaign).

=== Sizes of constituencies ===
Although one cannot see this on the face of the Charter, the Supreme Court has also ruled that section 3 guarantees a measure of equality in voting. In Reference re Prov. Electoral Boundaries (Sask.) (1991), it was found that constituencies should have roughly the same number of voters, although perfection was not required. The reasoning behind this expansion of section three's meaning was that it supposedly reflected the original purpose of the section, namely to allow "effective representation." The concession that perfection is not required stemmed from the fact that perfection would be impractical, given geographical limits in drawing boundaries and a general desire to give minorities more representation. While Saskatchewan's constituencies were found to be valid in the 1991 decision, Prince Edward Island's were later deemed unconstitutional by the courts and the province's electoral map had to be redrawn.

=== Referendums ===
While section 3's reach has been expanded to cover the sizes of constituencies, it has not been extended to guarantee the right to vote in a referendum. In Haig v. Canada (1993), it was ruled that since section 3 was designed in specific reference to electing representatives, the right could not include participation in a "device for the gathering of opinions". It was also noted that unlike elections, governments do not have to hold referendums, nor do governments have to commit themselves to the result of a referendum. Thus, how a referendum is administered is within governmental discretion.
