= Canada Elections Act =

Act of the Parliament of Canada

House of Commons
- Long title: An Act respecting the election of members to the House of Commons, repealing other Acts relating to elections and making consequential amendments to other Acts
- Citation: S.C. 2000, c. 9
- Enacted by: House of Commons
- Enacted by: Senate
- Assented to: May 31, 2000

Legislative history

Initiating chamber: House of Commons
- First reading: October 14, 1999
- Second reading: February 22, 2000
- Third reading: February 28, 2000

Revising chamber: Senate
- First reading: February 29, 2000
- Second reading: March 28, 2000
- Third reading: May 31, 2000
- Status: Amended

The Canada Elections Act (French: Loi électorale du Canada) is an Act of the Parliament of Canada which regulates the election of members of parliament to the House of Commons of Canada. The Act has been amended many times over Canada's history.

The Canada Elections Act limits spending on election advertising by interest groups, which was upheld by the Supreme Court of Canada in Harper v. Canada (Attorney General) (2004). It also sets out various provisions regarding the publication or broadcast of election advertising and election results.

== History ==
In 1989, the government of Canada appointed the Royal Commission on Electoral Reform and Party Financing regarding restrictions in the Elections Act inconsistent with Section Three of the Canadian Charter of Rights and Freedoms. In 2003, the Supreme Court of Canada ruled that parts of the Act did indeed violate Section Three on the basis that it unconstitutionally limits small political parties.

In 1996, the Act was amended to establish a Register of Electors and the International Register of Electors.

In 2003, the Act was extended to cover the nomination contests of registered parties. In 2007, it was amended by the Harper government to mandate fixed election dates.

== Notable provisions ==
- In 1993, Miguel Figueroa, then-leader of the Communist Party of Canada, challenged the constitutionality of the Act on the basis that its 50-member-minimum provisions discriminated against smaller political parties. Ontario's Superior Court of Justice ruled that the provisions were indeed unconstitutional. This decision was initially overturned by the Court of Appeal for Ontario, but ultimately upheld in 2003 by the Supreme Court of Canada, which agreed with the lower court's opinion that such provisions limited small parties, thus breaching Section Three of the Canadian Charter of Rights and Freedoms.
- Ever since fixed election dates in Canada were instituted by amending the Act in the 39th Parliament of Canada, Section 56.1 has established them for general elections as the third Monday of October in the fourth calendar year following the last general election while retaining the power of the Governor General to dissolve Parliament earlier at their discretion. Its companion section 56.2 permits the Chief Electoral Officer (with the consent of the Cabinet) to shift the election day by either 1 day or 1 week to avoid conflicts with cultural days or with other elections in Canada.
- Section 329 of the Act outlawed publishing election results from other ridings in constituencies where polls are still open. This section was upheld by the Supreme Court in R. v. Bryan (2007), but was repealed in 2015 because the wide use of the internet and social media had made it outdated and difficult to enforce.
- Section 335 requires that all broadcasters make 6.5 hours of advertising available for purchase by political parties over the course of a general election during "prime time" (the evening hours for TV stations and specialty channels, and morning and afternoon drive for radio stations). Even broadcasters that do not ordinarily accept advertising, such as the CBC's radio services, and (since 2017) premium pay TV channels like Crave/HBO and Super Channel, are required to accept these political ads during a federal election.
- Section 345 requires that all CRTC-licensed over-the-air radio and television networks, which reach the majority of Canadians in the language of broadcast, allocate free time for election broadcasts (in addition to the paid availabilities described above). However, there are no restrictions on when these free-time broadcasts must air, and most of these networks now confine them to late night.
  - As of 2025, the networks subject to this provision are CBC Television, Ici Radio-Canada Télé, CBC Radio One, Ici Radio-Canada Première, TVA, and Noovo. The amount of free time per election varies by network, from roughly 3.5 hours (for the CBC's TV networks) to 62 minutes (for TVA and Noovo).
  - Historically, CTV and the Radiomédia / Corus Québec radio network were also subject to free-time allocations; the Corus Québec network has since ceased operation, while CTV has not operated under a CRTC-issued national network licence since 2001 (and other "networks" such as Global have never operated under such licences). Note that there is currently no free-time allocation required for individual private radio or television stations, or cable specialty channels.
- Section 482(b), which finds anyone who "induces a person to vote or refrain from voting or to vote or refrain from voting for a particular candidate at an election" guilty of intimidation of the electoral process. Anyone convicted under s. 482(b) faces, on a summary conviction, a maximum $2,000 fine, or a maximum of one year in prison, or both. On an indictment, individuals found guilty face a maximum of five years in prison, a maximum $5,000 fine, or both.

== Political action committees ==
In 2015, wealthy U.S.-style political action committees (PAC) organizations were introduced to Ontario and Alberta and were expected to play a major role in Canadian political elections at the provincial and federal level. PACs are new to Canadian federal politics and are "technically federal non-profit corporations" registered with Industry Canada. The Canada Elections Act allows PACs to "spend up to $150,000 on third-party advertising during an election" but "spending outside the election period is [/was] unlimited." up until the enactment of the Elections Modernization Act in 2018, even after which spending was nonetheless unlimited outside of the defined pre-election periods.

In Ontario, the union-funded Working Families Coalition, spent millions on anti-conservative ads before the 2015 Ontario provincial elections. The left-leaning organization Engage Canada released its first anti-Harper attack ad early June 2015. The right-leaning Conservative PAC Foundation founded by high-profile Alberta conservatives Jonathan Denis, Brad Tennant and Zoe Addington in June 2015 funded advertising in support of Conservative Prime Minister Stephen Harper. The developer-funded right-wing group Ontario Proud and related groups have been active in Canadian elections since 2018.

== See also ==
- Canadian federal election
- Federal political financing in Canada
- Reform Act (Canada)
