= Zubairu Dada =

Nigerian politician

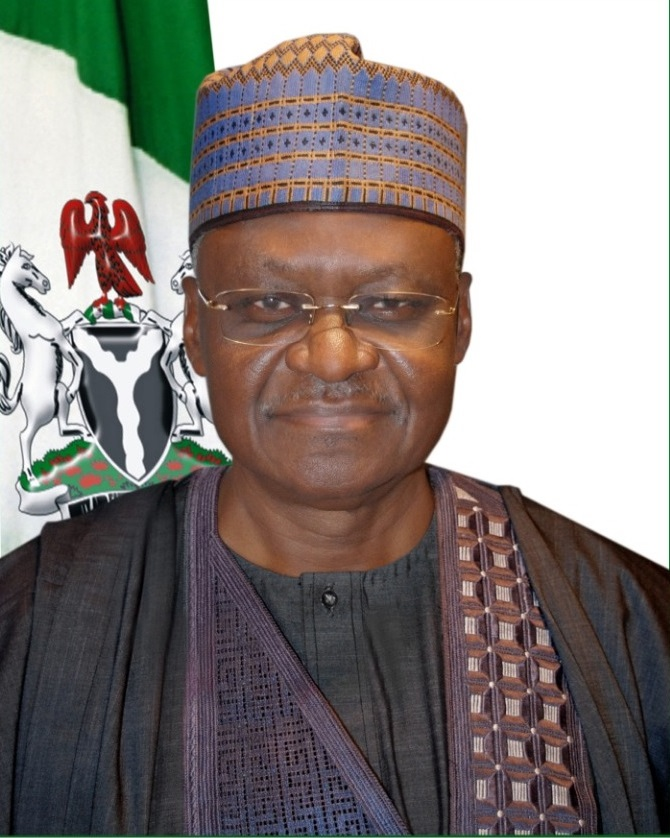
- Minister: State Foreign Affairs

Minister of State Foreign Affairs
- In office 2019

Personal details
- Born: 28 March 1952 (age 74)
- Citizenship: Nigeria

Ambassador Zubairu Dada was born on (28 March 1952) in Minna, Niger State. He is the minister of State Foreign Affairs of the Federal Republic of Nigeria, appointed in 2019. He was the director of Mass Mobilization for Self Reliance, Social Justice, and Economic Recovery from 1993 to 1993 where he rose to a position of Director, National Orientation Agency (NOA).
