= Harper v Canada (AG) =

- Supreme Court of Canada

Hearing: 10 February 2004 Judgment: 18 May 2004
- Full case name: Attorney General of Canada v Stephen Joseph Harper
- Citations: [2004] 1 S.C.R. 827; 2004 SCC 33 (CanLII); (2004), 239 D.L.R. (4th) 193; [2004] 8 W.W.R. 1; (2004), 119 C.R.R. (2d) 84; (2004), 27 Alta. L.R. (4th) 1
- Docket No.: 29618
- Prior history: Judgment for the respondent in the Court of Appeal for Alberta.
- Ruling: Spending limits in the Canada Elections Act are constitutional.

Court membership
- Chief Justice: Beverley McLachlin; Puisne Justices: Frank Iacobucci, John C. Major, Michel Bastarache, Ian Binnie, Louise Arbour, Louis LeBel, Marie Deschamps, Morris Fish

Reasons given
- Majority: Bastarache J., joined by Iacobucci, Arbour, LeBel, Deschamps, and Fish JJ.
- Concur/dissent: McLachlin C.J. and Major J., joined by Binnie J. (in parts)

Harper v Canada (AG), [2004] 1 S.C.R. 827, 2004 SCC 33, is a leading decision of the Supreme Court of Canada wherein the Court ruled that Canada Elections Act's spending limits on third party election advertising did violate section 2(b) of the Canadian Charter of Rights and Freedoms but was justified under Section One of the Canadian Charter of Rights and Freedoms.

== Background ==
The 1974 Election Expenses Act prohibited third party interest groups, defined as any individual or group other than a candidate or a registered political party, from spending money in promoting or opposing candidates and parties. In 1997, the Supreme Court ruled in Libman v. Attorney General of Quebec that restricting third party spending has a valid object "to permit an informed choice to be made by ensuring that some positions are not buried by others."

The Liberal Party of Canada's government introduced Bill C-2 which became the new Canada Elections Act in 2002. Bill C-2 limited third party election advertising maximum spending to $150,000 nationwide, of which a maximum of $3,000 can be spent on a given electoral district.

Stephen Harper, then president of the National Citizens Coalition (he became Prime Minister in 2006), launched a constitutional challenge in June 2000 to Court of Queen's Bench of Alberta in Edmonton. The court held that sections 350 and 351 of the Canada Elections Act were unconstitutional. The Alberta Court of Appeal, in a 2-1 decision, ruled on December 16, 2002, that all provisions on third party activities, except for section 358, violate the Charter of Rights and Freedoms.

== Ruling ==
The majority was written by Justice Bastarache with Justices Iacobucci, Arbour, LeBel, Deschamps and Fish concurring.

The court found that, though the spending limits infringe upon section 2b of the Charter, the law is reasonable and is justified in light of section 1. The majority concluded that the objective of the spending limits is electoral fairness. The law has an effect in creating "a level playing field for those who wish to engage in the electoral discourse, enabling voters to be better informed". In addition, section 3 of the Charter is not infringed because the right of meaningful participation in electoral process includes the right to participate in an informed manner. Without spending limits, individuals or groups can dominate the discussion and prevent opposing views from being heard.

== Dissent ==
Chief Justice McLachlin and Justice Major wrote for the dissent (in parts), with Justice Binnie concurring. The dissenting justices argued that the spending limit set out in section 350 of the Canada Elections Act is inconsistent with section 2b of the Charter of Rights and Freedoms as the third party limits were too restrictive. The limit of $3000 was insufficient to purchase a full-page advertisement in a major Canadian newspaper or to initiate a bulk-mailing campaign within a single riding with Canada Post. Thus, radio and television communication becomes the "exclusive right of registered political parties and their candidates". Section 351 should also be invalidated because "it is keyed exclusively to the spending limits in s. 350". The justices held that the remaining sections of the Elections Act were in violation of s 2(b) but saved by s 1.

== Aftermath ==
Stephen Harper later became Prime Minister and held that office for almost a decade, during which time his Conservative government enacted several far-reaching changes elsewhere to the Canada Elections Act and related electoral laws. Despite this, the Harper government only made minor changes to Sections 350 and 351, which remain in force (complete with limits originally prescribed in 2000 that are neither adjusted for nor indexed to inflation) as of 2016.

== See also ==
- List of Supreme Court of Canada cases (McLachlin Court)
- Elections in Canada
- Canadian electoral system
- R. v. Bryan
- Interest group
