= National Citizens Coalition =

Conservative lobby group in Canada

- Coalition nationale des citoyens
- Abbreviation: NCC
- Formation: 1967: 1975 (incorporated)
- Founder: Colin M. Brown
- Type: Lobby group
- Headquarters: Toronto
- Location: Canada
- President and CEO: Peter Coleman
- Website: www.nationalcitizens.ca

The National Citizens Coalition (NCC) is a Canadian conservative lobby group that was incorporated in 1975 by Colin M. Brown, a successful insurance agent who strongly opposed public health insurance—Medicare. In response to what he perceived to be excessive government spending in Canada, Brown had begun an advertisement campaign in 1967. Its slogan is "More freedom through less government", and campaigns against public sector unions and in favour of smaller government and lower taxes.

From 1998 to 2002, the president of the group was Stephen Harper, who served as the 22nd prime minister of Canada from 2006 to 2015.

== Mandate ==
The NCC has supported privatization, tax cuts and government spending cuts; it also opposes electoral laws that limit third-party spending. It has been heavily involved in advertising, political campaigns and legal challenges in support of its goals of "more freedom through less government." The Tyee on March 23, 2011, described the NCC as an "Alberta-based think tank that crusades for smaller government and less taxes".

== Overview ==
In the 1970s, the three federal political parties—the Liberals under Prime Minister Pierre Trudeau, the Conservatives under Robert Stanfield and the NDP under David Lewis—gave no voice to corporate Canada or the business elite in policy making in the Canadian parliament. Stanfield was supportive of state intervention, as a Red Tory. Lewis thought that big business received too many tax breaks and subsidies as "corporate welfare bums." In the 1970s, labour was increasing its power, public safety nets were being introduced, and participatory government was growing. To reverse this trend, from 1974 to 1976, CEOs took major initiatives. The Business Council on National Issues (BCNI), the Fraser Institute—a conservative and libertarian public policy think tank established in 1974, and the National Citizens' Coalition—incorporated in 1975—were formed to change the political culture to support the business elite. The two latter organizations focussed on changing public opinion.

Incorporated in Ontario in 1975, the NCC was founded by insurance agent Colin M. Brown, who had begun an advertising campaign in 1967 against what he perceived as excessive government spending.

In 1987, David Somerville became the NCC's leader.

In 1993, the NCC successfully supported Stephen Harper's bid to become a Reform Party Member of Parliament for Calgary West.

In the 1990s, the NCC founded and funded Ontarians for Responsible Government, a lobby group that played a large role in electing the Progressive Conservative Harris government in Ontario of 1995–2003.

It has also legally challenged electoral financing laws limiting third-party advertising spending during election campaigns, but unsuccessfully, in Harper v. Canada (Attorney General).

In 1997, Harper resigned as Member of Parliament and joined the NCC and became the NCC's vice-president. From 1998 to 2002, Stephen Harper served as NCC president with Gerry Nicholls as vice-president. In 2002, Harper resigned as NCC's president to seek the leadership of the Canadian Alliance. Harper served as 22nd Prime Minister of Canada from 2006 to 2015.

At a June 1997 meeting of the American political organization, the Council for National Policy (CNP), held in Montreal, Quebec, Harper said that the American "conservative movement" was a light and an inspiration to [Canada] and across the world." Harper compared Canada with the United States in the 1990s, saying that the "standard of living" was "substantially lower" in Canada while the unemployment rate was almost double that of the United States and that there was a "massive brain drain of young professionals". The Council for National Policy is a "little-known group that has served for decades as a hub for a nationwide network of conservative activists and the donors who support them". It was established during the Reagan administration in 1981 by right-wing conservative Christians. Its members are a "few hundred of the most powerful conservatives in the country," who meet "behind closed doors at undisclosed locations for a confidential conference, according to the New York Times. In his speech. Harper summarized his perspective on the federal parties in 1997 with a focus on the Reform party, its leader Preston Manning, its strengths, weaknesses and future as a Christian conservative movement.

In 2003 Peter Coleman became NCC's full-time as Chief Operating Officer and in 2006 NCC's President and CEO.

The NCC holds no annual general membership meetings and provides no financial statements to its members. The organization's constitution distinguishes between 'voting' and 'public' members. Public members pay dues but do not have formal mechanisms for influencing the organization's policies or priorities. Public members are not entitled to be notified of or to attend any meetings, and they are not entitled to vote at any such meetings.

It is headquartered in Toronto and reports an annual budget of $2.8 million. The organization has fought to keep information about itself confidential, and opposed amendments to the Canada Elections Act that would have required third-party organizations like the NCC to publish the names of all contributors donating more than $250.

== Campaigns against Medicare ==
Brown was vehemently opposed to public health insurance, although the NCC is now reluctant to take such a stand on this issue, as it would be unpopular with the electorate. The NCC would go on in subsequent years to campaign against "socialized medicine" and other government programs.

== Anti-labour campaigns ==
The NCC campaigned against the general strike organized by the Canadian Labour Congress against wage and price controls imposed by the Liberal government of Pierre Trudeau in 1975.

== Anti-union activity ==
In 1995 the NCC launched the "Canadians against forced unions" with spokesman Rob Anders saying, "The time has come to free Alberta's workers." The project was dedicated to the introduction of anti-union "right-to-work" legislation.

The NCC provided CA$1 million in financial support in a series of cases filed by Francis Lavigne, a former Ontario community college teacher who alleged that Ontario Public Service Employees Union fees were being used to support causes he opposed, which he claimed infringed his rights under the freedom of expression section of the Canadian Charter of Rights and Freedoms. In a leading Supreme Court of Canada 1991 decision Lavigne v Ontario Public Service Employees Union, Lavigne lost.

== Anti-immigration ==
During the refugee crisis, the Vietnamese boat people in 1979 and 1980, the NCC staged a campaign against admitting the refugees of the Viet Nam war into Canada. They placed newspaper advertisements "questioning whether the government has been forthcoming about the number of Vietnamese refugees they will allow into Canada." David Somerville appeared on the CBC Sunday Morning show to present the NCC's case.

== Campaigns ==
The NCC has campaigned against:

- the Canada Health Act,
- the Canadian Wheat Board,
- the general strike organized by the Canadian Labour Congress against wage and price controls imposed by the Liberal government of Pierre Trudeau in 1975
- the admittance of Vietnamese boat people (post-Vietnam War refugees) to Canada in 1979–1980
- closed-shop unions
- the so-called "gold-plated" pension plan for Members of Parliament
- real or perceived government waste in general
- the mandatory long-form census
- Quebec's Charter of the French Language (Bill 101)
