= Elections Modernization Act =

Canadian Federal Legislation

Parliament of Canada
- Long title: An Act to amend the Canada Elections Act and other Acts and to make certain consequential amendments
- Citation: S.C. 2018, c. 31
- Considered by: House of Commons of Canada
- Considered by: Senate of Canada
- Royal assent: December 13, 2018

Legislative history
- Bill citation: Bill C-76
- Introduced by: Karina Gould MP, Minister of Democratic Institutions
- First reading: April 30, 2018
- Second reading: October 22, 2018
- Third reading: October 30, 2018
- Bill citation: Bill C-76
- Member(s) in charge: Dennis Dawson
- First reading: October 31, 2018
- Second reading: November 7, 2018
- Third reading: December 6, 2018
- Status: Current legislation

The Elections Modernization Act (French: Loi sur la modernisation des élections) was enacted as Bill C-76 by the 42nd Parliament of Canada under the government of Justin Trudeau as a response to the Fair Elections Act. The bill received royal assent on December 13, 2018, in time for the 2019 Canadian Election.

== History ==
On February 4, 2014, in response to 38 recommendations by Canada's Chief Electoral Officer, the government of Stephen Harper introduced the Fair Elections Act. The provisions of the bill were opposed by all opposition parties and, in testimony, the Chief Electoral Officer criticized the bill as "[undermining] its stated purpose." Shortly thereafter, Liberal Party leader Justin Trudeau vowed to repeal the act, as did Thomas Mulcair, then leader of the official opposition and of the New Democratic Party.

On October 19, 2015, Justin Trudeau and the Liberal Party were elected to form government in the 42nd Parliament of Canada, and proposed Bill C-33, which they would later substitute with C-76, to replace the Act.

== Features ==
The Act imposed new spending caps on political and third parties in the period directly preceding an election (in addition to the existing limitations in election periods), and required reporting by such third parties on partisan activities, advertising, and election surveying, as well as disclosure on advertising in such pre-election period; it also requires third parties maintain a separate account for aforementioned.

Furthermore, the act also reduced barriers to the political process by:

- creating a Register of Future Electors, where teenagers 14-17 can place their name for automatic registration when they attain voting age;
- broadening the application period for accommodations for people with disabilities, and creating financial incentives for political parties and candidates to accommodate them in election periods;
- easing rules for treating candidate childcare, litigation, and disability accommodation expenses;
- allowing military members to vote by multiple means;
- giving the Chief Electoral Officer the ability to engage in public education and information activities;
- repealing limitations on expatatriate voting for those who haven't resided in Canada for 5 years, or don't intend to return;
- extending hours on advance voting days.

Finally, the act caps election periods to 50 days; limits the Chief Electoral Officer's delegation authority; eases administrative requirements to hiring of election officers, and towards information sharing within the government regarding non-citizens; allows the voter identification card received by electors prior to an election as valid identification for voting; ends signature requirements for advance voting; reorganizes the office of Commissioner of Canada Elections, and gives them the authority to impose fines and file charges, and to subpoena with court approval; strengthens laws regarding foreign influence; and finally, it limits the calling of by-elections close to the general election, and makes rules for privacy against political parties/candidates.

The Act directs Elections Canada to invest more to make participating in elections more accessible to people with disabilities. There are several initiatives, but perhaps the most visible was direction in 18.1 (3) for the Chief Electoral Officer to acquire and evaluate improved voting technology for use by electors with a disability.

== Coming-into-force ==
The bulk of the act came into force on June 13, 2019, but Elections Canada sped up the coming-into-force of several provisions; first on January 19, again on April 1, and finally on May 11 .

== See also ==
- Fair Elections Act
- International Register of Electors
