= Galindo =

Galindo may refer to:

== People ==
=== Surname ===
- Aarón Galindo (born 1982), Mexican footballer
- Alba Galindo (born 1981), Colombian model
- Alberto Flores Galindo (1949–1990), Peruvian historian, social scientist, and essay writer
- Alejandro Galindo (footballer) (born 1992), Guatemalan footballer
- Alex Galindo (born 1985), Puerto Rican basketball player
- Álvaro Galindo (born 1982), Argentine rugby footballer
- Alvaro Galindo (born 1970), Ecuadorian/Colombian lawyer
- Ana Galindo (born 1987), Honduran swimmer
- Ana Galindo (born 2003), Mexican rhythmic gymnast
- Ana Galindo Santolaria (born 1973), Spanish skier
- Anaida Poilievre (Anaida Galindo, born 1987), Venezuelan-born Canadian political staffer
- Anisleidy Galindo (born 1989), Cuban basketball player
- Anthony Galindo, member of MDO pop/rock band
- Beatriz Galindo (c. 1465 – 1534), Spanish writer and educator
- Benjamín Galindo (born 1960), Mexican footballer
- Blas Galindo (1910–1993), Mexican composer
- Carlos Blanco Galindo (1882–1943), Bolivian military officer, lawyer and president
- Cavernario Galindo (1923–1999), Mexican wrestler and actor
- Cayo Galindo, Peruvian politician
- Crystal Galindo (born 1983), American artist
- Danilo Galindo (born 1963), Honduran footballer
- David Galindo Delgado (born 1975), Mexican politician
- Devyn Galindo, American photographer
- Enrique Rodríguez Galindo (1939–2021), Spanish brigadier general of the Civil Guard
- Eudoro Galindo (1943–2019), Bolivian businessman, diplomat, and politician
- Gabriela Medrano Galindo (born 1983), Mexican politician
- Gerardo Galindo (born 1978), Mexican footballer
- Gonzalo Galindo (born 1974), Bolivian footballer
- Heriberto Galindo Quiñones (born 1951), Mexican politician and diplomat
- Hermila Galindo (1896–1954), Mexican feminist and writer
- Jaime Bailon Galindo, Spanish paralympic swimmer
- Jeremy Galindo, guitarist in American post-rock band This Will Destroy You
- Jorge Rivera Galindo (born 1978), Colombian footballer
- Juan Galindo (1802–1839), Central American explorer and army officer
- Juan Carlos Galindo, Colombian government official
- Laura Garza Galindo (1947–2019), Mexican politician
- María Galindo (born 1964), Bolivian anarcha-feminist, lesbian activist, and psychologist
- Mario Galindo (born 1951), Chilean footballer
- Maykel Galindo (born 1981), Cuban footballer
- Miguel Galindo Garcés, Spanish skier
- Nacho Galindo (singer) (born 1959), Mexican musician and Christian artist
- Nacho Galindo (actor) (1908–1973), Mexican-American actor
- Philemon Galindo (1770–1840), British actor/Central American army officer
- Plácido Galindo (1906–1988), Peruvian footballer
- Ramón Galindo Noriega (born 1955), Mexican politician
- Regina José Galindo (born 1974), Guatemalan performance artist
- Reynaldo Galindo Pohl (1918–2012), Salvadoran lawyer and diplomat
- Rick Galindo (born 1981), American politician
- Roberto Galindo (born 1980), Bolivian footballer
- Rodolfo Galindo (born 1996), Mexican footballer
- Rudy Galindo (born 1969), American skater
- Samuel Galindo (born 1992), Bolivian footballer
- Samuel Lewis Galindo (born 1927), Panamanian businessman, politician and author
- Sergio Galindo (1926–1993), Mexican novelist
- Silvio Lagos Galindo (born 1978, Mexican politician
- Vicky Galindo (born 1983), American softball player
- Zeferino Torreblanca Galindo (born 1954), Mexican politician
- original surname of Prudentius of Troyes

=== Given name ===
- Galindo Garcés (died 844), count of Aragón
- Galindo, birth name of Prudentius of Troyes (died 861), bishop
- Galindo Aznárez I (died 867), count of Aragón
- Galindo Aznárez II (died 922), count of Aragón
- Galindo Mellado Cruz (1973–2014), Mexican drug lord

== Places ==
- Galindo, a former name of Villa Francisca, Dominican Republic
- 21448 Galindo, an asteroid discovered in 1998
- Blanco Galindo Avenue, a road in the Cochabamba department of Bolivia
- Casas de San Galindo, a municipality in the province of Guadalajara, Castile-La Mancha, Spain
- Don Francisco Galindo House, an historic house in Concord, California
- Juan Galindo (municipality), a town and municipality in Puebla, Mexico
- Galindo, Austin, Texas, a neighborhood in Austin
- Galindo y Perahuy, village and municipality in Salamanca, Spain

== Other uses ==
- IES Beatriz Galindo, a high school in Madrid, Spain
- Torneo Plácido Galindo, a football tournament in Peru
  - 1989 Torneo Plácido Galindo, the only instance of this tournament
- Virgins of Galindo, three Dominican sisters who were slaughtered and raped in 1822
