= Pierre Poilievre =

Canadian politician (born 1979)

The Honourable Pierre Poilievre PC MP
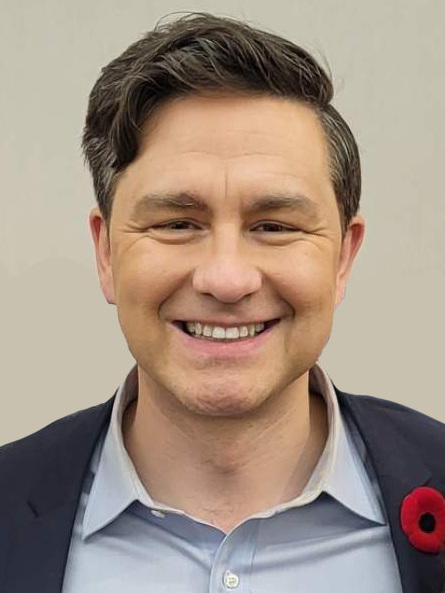
- Poilievre in 2023

Leader of the Opposition
- Incumbent
- Assumed office August 18, 2025
- Deputy: Melissa Lantsman; Tim Uppal
- Preceded by: Andrew Scheer
- In office September 10, 2022 – April 28, 2025
- Deputy: Melissa Lantsman; Tim Uppal
- Preceded by: Candice Bergen
- Succeeded by: Andrew Scheer

Leader of the Conservative Party
- Incumbent
- Assumed office September 10, 2022
- Deputy: Melissa Lantsman; Tim Uppal
- Preceded by: Candice Bergen (interim)
Ministerial positions
Minister of Employment and Social Development
In office February 9 – November 4, 2015
Prime Minister	Stephen Harper
Preceded by	Jason Kenney
Succeeded by	Jean-Yves Duclos (Families, Children and Social Development) MaryAnn Mihychuk (Employment, Workforce Development and Labour)
Minister of State (Democratic Reform) (Note: Office known as "Minister of State (Democratic Reform)" from July 15, 2013, to February 9, 2015.)
In office July 15, 2013 – November 4, 2015
Prime Minister	Stephen Harper
Preceded by	Tim Uppal
Succeeded by	Maryam Monsef (Democratic Institutions)
Shadow Minister
2021–2022	Finance
Feb–Nov 2021	Jobs and Industry
2017–2021	Finance
2016–2017	Employment, Labour and Work Opportunity
2015–2016	Treasury Board
Parliamentary Secretary
2011–2013	Transport, Infrastructure and Communities
2008–2011	Prime Minister
2008–2011	Intergovernmental Affairs
2006–2008	Treasury Board

Member of Parliament
- Incumbent
- Assumed office August 18, 2025
- Preceded by: Damien Kurek
- Constituency: Battle River—Crowfoot
- In office June 28, 2004 – April 28, 2025
- Preceded by: David Pratt
- Succeeded by: Bruce Fanjoy
- Constituency: Nepean—Carleton (2004–2015); Carleton (2015–2025)

Personal details
- Born: Pierre Marcel Poilievre; June 3, 1979 (age 47) Calgary, Alberta, Canada
- Party: Conservative (since 2003)
- Other political affiliations: Reform (until 2000); Alliance (2000–2003)
- Spouse: Anaida Galindo (m. 2017)
- Children: 2
- Education: University of Calgary (BA)
- Website: Campaign website

Pierre Marcel Poilievre (Note: /ˈpɒli.ɛv, ˌpɒliˈɛv/ POL-ee-ev, POL-ee-EV; in French, may be pronounced [pwa.ljɛvʁ]) (born June 3, 1979) is a Canadian politician who has served as the leader of the Conservative Party and leader of the Official Opposition since 2022. (Note: Poilievre's tenure as Leader of the Opposition was interrupted between April 28, 2025, when he lost his seat in Carleton in the general election, and was forced to find a safe riding to be re-elected. On August 18, 2025, he was elected to the Battle River—Crowfoot seat following a by-election victory.) First elected in 2004, he has been the member of Parliament (MP) for Battle River—Crowfoot since August 2025, and previously represented Carleton until his defeat in April 2025.

Poilievre was born and raised in Calgary, Alberta, and moved to Ottawa in 2000 to work for Canadian Alliance leader Stockwell Day. He was first elected in the 2004 federal election, initially representing the riding of Nepean—Carleton before it was reconfigured as Carleton. In 2008, Poilievre graduated with a bachelor's degree in international relations from the University of Calgary. Under Prime Minister Stephen Harper, he held various parliamentary secretary roles from 2006 to 2013 before serving as minister for democratic reform from 2013 to 2015 and concurrently as minister of employment and social development in 2015. From 2017 to 2022, he was the Conservative Party's shadow minister for finance and was briefly shadow minister for jobs and industry.

Poilievre ran in the 2022 Conservative Party leadership election, winning a landslide on the first ballot. As leader of the Opposition, Poilievre has primarily focused on economic issues, especially the cost of living in Canada. His policy positions include reducing the budget deficit, cutting personal income taxes, defunding the Canadian Broadcasting Corporation (CBC), and repealing what he describes as "anti-energy" laws, including the federal carbon tax on both consumers and industries. He is considered to be part of the Blue Tory faction within the Conservative Party, and has been described as a populist.

Poilievre led the Conservative Party in the 2025 federal election. The Conservatives held a large polling lead in the run-up to the election until the resignation of Justin Trudeau and rhetoric from President Donald Trump calling for Canada to become the 51st state. The party increased their seat total from 120 to 144 seats and achieved the largest share of the popular vote since its founding in 2003; however, Poilievre lost his seat to Liberal candidate Bruce Fanjoy, and the governing Liberal Party led by Mark Carney was re-elected with a minority government. After losing his seat in Carleton, Poilievre contested the riding of Battle River—Crowfoot in Alberta, where a by-election was triggered following the resignation of Conservative MP Damien Kurek. Poilievre won the by-election on August 18.

== Early life ==
=== Background and childhood ===
Pierre Marcel Poilievre was born on June 3, 1979, in Calgary, Alberta, to 16-year-old high school student Jacqueline Farrell, whose mother had recently died. Farrell had planned to name him Jeff, a name he is still occasionally called in adulthood, before placing him for adoption. He was adopted by two schoolteachers, Marlene and Donald Poilievre, shortly after being born. Donald is Fransaskois, a French-Canadian from Saskatchewan. The couple later also adopted his younger biological half-brother, Patrick. The boys were raised in suburban Calgary, playing ice hockey and going on camping trips. Pierre was raised as a Catholic.

Growing up, Poilievre worked as a paperboy for the Calgary Sun. He attended Henry Wise Wood High School and was on a wrestling team until he was forced to stop due to a temporary shoulder tendinitis injury at age 14. Following the injury, Poilievre attended an Alberta Tory riding-association meeting as a new hobby. As a result, he became interested in politics and started reading political books, including Milton Friedman's Capitalism and Freedom, a book that greatly influenced his politics.

Poilievre became active in the Reform Party and the Progressive Conservative Association of Alberta by participating in meetings of both parties. At age 16, he sold Reform Party memberships for Jason Kenney and did telephone canvassing for him. He also knocked on doors for political campaigns and served on a riding association. Shortly after turning 17, he was a delegate to the Reform Party 1996 national convention in Vancouver, British Columbia. Poilievre graduated from Henry Wise Wood High School in 1997.

Poilievre's adoptive parents, who had married in 1971, separated when he was in his mid-teens. His father, Donald, later came out as gay. In his early twenties, Poilievre met both his biological mother and maternal grandfather for the first time.

=== University and early jobs ===
As a teenager, Poilievre had a job at Telus doing corporate collections by calling businesses. He later worked briefly as a journalist for Alberta Report, a conservative weekly magazine. At the University of Calgary, he studied international relations, graduating in 2008. At age 19, he staged a protest against a student union that tried to prevent campus Reform Party supporters from campaigning for their candidate in an Alberta Senate election. He was one of many Reform members on campus in conflict with the federal Progressive Conservative Party of Canada, which they believed to be unprincipled.

In 1999, as a second-year student, Poilievre submitted an essay to Magna International's "As prime minister, I Would..." essay contest. His essay, "Building Canada Through Freedom", focused on individual freedom and, among other things, argued for a two-term limit for members of Parliament. As a finalist, Poilievre won $10,000 and a four-month internship at Magna, with the essay published in the book that collected the essays, @Stake — "As Prime Minister, I Would..."

Poilievre was president of the University of Calgary's Young Conservatives Club, which was composed of both Progressive Conservative and Reform members focused on Alberta politics. He clashed with Patrick Brown, at the time the president of the national Progressive Conservative Youth Federation. Their dispute was over Progressive Conservative leader Joe Clark, whom Poilievre considered anti-youth. Concerned that anti-Clark members would be removed, as Brown was an executive for the Progressive Conservatives, Poilievre threatened to shift the Progressive Conservative club to the United Alternative. Media outlets obtained a leaked memo saying that Brown planned to remove anti-Clark youth leaders, but Brown denied it, leading Poilievre to back down from his threat.

=== Canadian Alliance work ===
In 2000, Poilievre was an organizer on a website called Organization to Draft Stockwell Day, seeking to recruit Alberta Treasurer Stockwell Day as leader of the Canadian Alliance party. With Day running in the leadership election, Poilievre and his colleagues made phone calls to canvass and raise money, dubbing themselves the "Fight Club".

In 2002, after Day's tenure as Leader of the Official Opposition, Poilievre left Calgary and university without graduating to work as an advisor to Day, but he completed online coursework through Athabasca University to earn a Bachelor of Arts degree from the University of Calgary in 2008. After Jean Chrétien announced he would retire as prime minister in 2002, Poilievre and Ezra Levant, who practised law at the time, wrote an op-ed advocating the merger of the Canadian Alliance and the Progressive Conservative parties. Poilievre was campaign communication director during Levant's campaign to replace Preston Manning in the 2002 Calgary Southwest by-election, until Levant withdrew to allow Stephen Harper to run.

In 2003, Poilievre founded 3D Contact Inc. with business partner Jonathan Denis, who became an Alberta Cabinet minister years later. 3D Contact provided political communications, polling and research services. After founding the company, Poilievre ran for MP as a member of the Conservative Party of Canada, which had recently been formed from a merger of the Canadian Alliance and Progressive Conservatives.

== Early political career (2004–2022) ==
=== Backbencher (2004–2006) ===
With preparations being made for the 2004 Canadian federal election, the 24-year old Manordale resident Poilievre won the Conservative nomination in the riding of Nepean—Carleton against Liberal incumbent David Pratt. Though Pratt was a two-term incumbent and cabinet minister, the election was projected to be close between the two. Poilievre won his riding, and the Conservatives formed the Official Opposition to a Liberal minority government. Poilievre entered the 38th Canadian Parliament at the age of 25 along with Andrew Scheer as the youngest members of the Conservative caucus. Poilievre introduced himself and his young colleagues to media outlets as "libertarian-minded" members of the party. Poilievre was given the nickname "Skippy" early in his political career.

Poilievre took up the cause of the Queensway Carleton Hospital, which was in the midst of an expansion project while facing provincial funding reductions for operations and an increase in rent as its lease with the National Capital Commission was set to expire in 2013. Seeking to eliminate the rent the hospital paid, Poilievre introduced, on June 20, 2005, a private member Bill C-414, titled An Act to prevent the Government of Canada from charging rent to non-profit hospitals. The bill was defeated in a vote of 165–111 but with Nepean—Carleton MPP John Baird they advocated the hospital only pay a $1 per year rent and implemented that once Baird became President of the Treasury Board the next year.

Poilievre also sponsored private member Bill C-383, introduced on May 11, 2005, to create a means to recall Members of Parliament through a petition, and Bill C-456, on November 24, 2005, to insert parental responsibility into the Criminal Code by making it an offence for a parent to contribute through negligence, inappropriate action or lack of appropriate action to behaviour that results in their child committing an offence.

Poilievre voiced opposition to the appointment of Michaëlle Jean as the Governor General of Canada by taking an issue with Jean's past support of the Quebec sovereignty movement. Poilievre took out a petition asking the Queen of Canada to dismiss Jean. After the death of Elizabeth II in 2022, Jean said that the Queen dismissed Poilievre's petition over the Queen's belief that she cannot intervene in Canadian affairs.

=== Parliamentary secretary (2006–2013) ===
Poilievre won re-election with over 50% of the vote in the 2006 federal election, by which the Conservative party formed a minority government. Entering the 39th Canadian Parliament at the age of 26, he remained the youngest MP in the House of Commons. Prime Minister Stephen Harper appointed Poilievre to act as Parliamentary Secretary to the President of the Treasury Board, who was his fellow Nepean-area Conservative MP John Baird. Poilievre's parliamentary work included overseeing the drafting and adoption of the Federal Accountability Act.

Addressing the prime minister's apology on behalf of the Canadian government for the Indian residential school system and planned reparations, Poilievre stated he did not think Canada was "getting value for all this money", instead suggesting "we need to engender the values of hard work and independence and self-reliance." Poilievre apologized in Parliament the next day, saying, "Mr. Speaker, I rise today to offer a full apology to aboriginal people, to the House and to all Canadians. Yesterday, on a day when the House and all Canadians were celebrating a new beginning, I made remarks that were hurtful and wrong. I accept responsibility for them, and I apologize."

In the 2008 federal election, Poilievre, then a Barrhaven resident, was again re-elected with over 50% of the vote in his Nepean–Carleton riding with his party forming another minority government. For the 40th Canadian Parliament, Prime Minister Harper appointed Poilievre as parliamentary secretary to the prime minister. After Harper decided Canada would boycott the Durban Review Conference due to concerns of anti-Semitism, Poilievre and Liberal Party MP Irwin Cotler were sent to Geneva, Switzerland, to attend the alternative Conference Against Racism, Discrimination, and Persecution. Poilievre went on to Poland for the March of the Living. He was assigned to be a member of the Special Panel on Employment Insurance, tasked by Harper and Liberal Party leader Michael Ignatieff to find an interparty compromise to address the 2008 financial crisis. He was also assigned to the Information, Privacy and Ethics Committee where he expressed concern over camera surveillance, like Google Street View, and called for CEO of Google Eric Schmidt to testify.

Poilievre became known as the Conservative Party's "attack dog". Following the 2009 Liberal Party leadership election, he sent a letter to the Commissioner of Canada Elections alleging contraventions of federal fundraising regulations. In 2010, a police probe was triggered after Poilievre drove through a Parliament Hill screening gate without being permitted entry by the RCMP. Instead, he pressed the entrance button himself and drove his vehicle through. After Poilievre was identified as the driver and the incident was reported on in the media, he apologized. As in 2006 and 2008, in 2011 Poilievre won re-election in Nepean–Carleton with over 50% of the vote. For this 41st Canadian Parliament, the Conservative Party formed a majority government, and Prime Minister Harper appointed Poilievre as Parliamentary Secretary to the Minister of Transport, Infrastructure and Communities (Denis Lebel) and for the Federal Economic Development Agency for Southern Ontario (FedDev Ontario) — assisting Gary Goodyear and Steven Fletcher.

In early September 2012, while serving on the FedDev Ontario, Poilievre echoed then-Ontario MPP Randy Hillier's calls for ending workers' mandatory union payments. When asked in 2012 if his advocacy was akin to right-to-work laws implemented in parts of the United States, Poilievre described it as an "enhancement of workers rights and freedoms". In early 2013, both Poilievre, at the federal level, and Hillier, at the provincial level, called for greater transparency regarding union finances, citing the way in which the National Capital Region branch of the Public Service Alliance of Canada supported the Parti Québécois in the 2012 provincial elections, and how unions had supported student protests using union funds. Poilievre wrote forcefully against the 1946 Rand formula used in Canadian labour law, which stems from a Supreme Court ruling that allows unions to collect mandatory dues from workers they represent. Union supporters believed deprivation of mandatory dues would weaken unions.

Russ Hiebert's private member's bill, C-377, An Act to Amend the Income Tax Act (labour organizations), was passed into law in June 2015, making union fees optional. One of the last pieces of legislation passed under Harper's premiership, the measure was repealed by the 42nd Canadian Parliament in June 2017, with its provisions having never come into effect.

=== Cabinet minister (2013–2015) ===
==== Minister of State for Democratic Reform ====
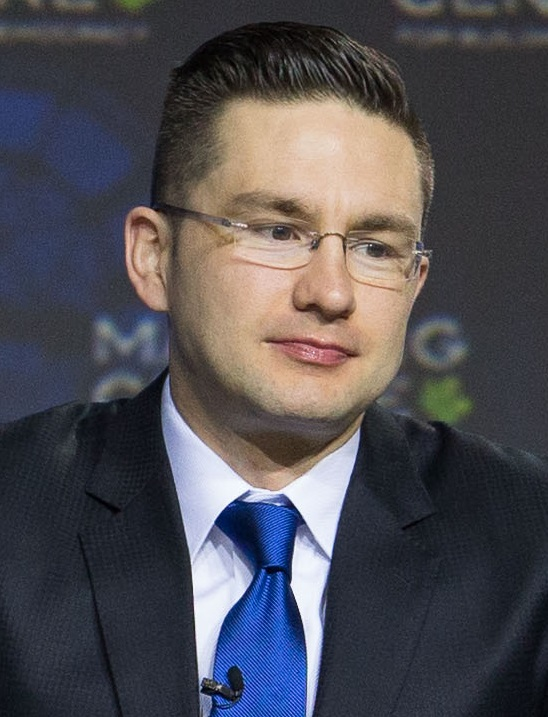
Poilievre on a Manning Centre conference panel on reform or abolition of the Canadian Senate, March 2014

In July 2013, Harper shuffled his cabinet, adding several new members, including Poilievre to replace Tim Uppal as Minister of State (Democratic Reform). With the 2011 Canadian federal election voter suppression scandal concluding, the Canadian Senate expenses scandal unfolding, and the Senate Reform Act (to allow each province to recommend Senate candidates and impose a maximum 9-year term limit) paused at second reading to hear from the Supreme Court of Canada as to its constitutionality, this position was seen by the media as one of the most difficult and consequential in the cabinet. After the Supreme Court unanimously ruled that the Senate Reform Act would require substantial provincial consent, and Harper ruled out the use of a national referendum, reform efforts were abandoned. After Justin Trudeau, leader of the Liberal Party, which controlled the second most Senate seats, began implementing his Senate reform plan of making senators independent with a non-partisan appointment process, Poilievre dismissed the measures, maintaining that Senators should be elected.

On February 4, 2014, Poilievre introduced Bill C-23, known as the Fair Elections Act, into the House of Commons, which was eventually passed. Among other provisions, the bill expanded the types of acceptable personal identification for voting, and eliminated the vouching system, whereby a voter could vote without ID if a voter with ID vouched for their identity. The bill was opposed by former chief electoral officer Jean-Pierre Kingsley, former auditor general Sheila Fraser, and dozens of Canadian, as well as international, political experts — Poilievre stepped up his attacks on Marc Mayrand, the chief electoral officer of Elections Canada at the time, by accusing him of wanting "more power, a bigger budget and less accountability".

Poilievre introduced Bill C-50, known as the Citizen Voting Act, into the House of Commons in December 2014. The bill was the government's response to an Ontario Superior Court ruling, which was later upheld by the Supreme Court in Frank v Canada (AG), which had determined the disfranchisement of expatriates who have lived abroad for more than five years was unconstitutional. Bill C-50 proposed to insert additional documentation requirements for expatriates to be able to vote.

==== Minister of Employment and Social Development ====
In a small cabinet shuffle, instigated by the decision of Foreign Affairs Minister John Baird to not seek re-election, the prime minister promoted Poilievre, on February 9, 2015, to a ministerial position. He replaced Jason Kenney as minister of employment and social development and took on Baird's role as minister responsible for the National Capital Commission while keeping his duties as the minister responsible for democratic reform. Also at that time, the National Capital Commission was pursuing the development of the Memorial to the Victims of Communism – Canada, a Land of Refuge and trying to decide where to locate it; Poilievre advocated for the site adjacent to the Supreme Court of Canada building.

In July 2015, Poilievre announced an expansion of a child care benefit program. During the announcement, he wore a Conservative Party of Canada shirt, stated that the payments were from "our Conservative government", and said that "if the Liberals and NDP were to take office they would take the benefits away and raise taxes." Later in 2017, the elections commissioner determined that the occasion was akin to a Conservative party campaign event, rather than a Government of Canada announcement. As the government spent approximately $4,800 related to the event, it was essentially "a de facto non-monetary contribution" to the Conservative party. The commissioner ruled that this was a campaign finance violation, as Poilievre had "knowingly circumvent[ed] the prohibition on contributions to a registered party by ineligible contributors." Poilievre was ordered to post a link to the ruling on his social media.

=== Opposition MP and shadow minister (2015–2022) ===
Poilievre‘s riding was split in half in the 2012 Canadian federal electoral redistribution. The more urban western half, including Nepean, was carved out of his riding to become the revived Nepean riding. Poilievre moved from Barrhaven to Greely to seek election in the more rural Carleton, essentially his old riding's eastern half. Poilievre narrowly won the seat in the election for the 42nd Canadian Parliament but the Conservatives only won enough seats to form the Official Opposition to a Liberal majority government. Following Harper's resignation as leader, interim party leader Rona Ambrose made Poilievre the Conservative Party critic on issues relating to the Treasury Board until October 2016 when she moved him to critic on issues relating to Employment, Labour and Work Opportunity.

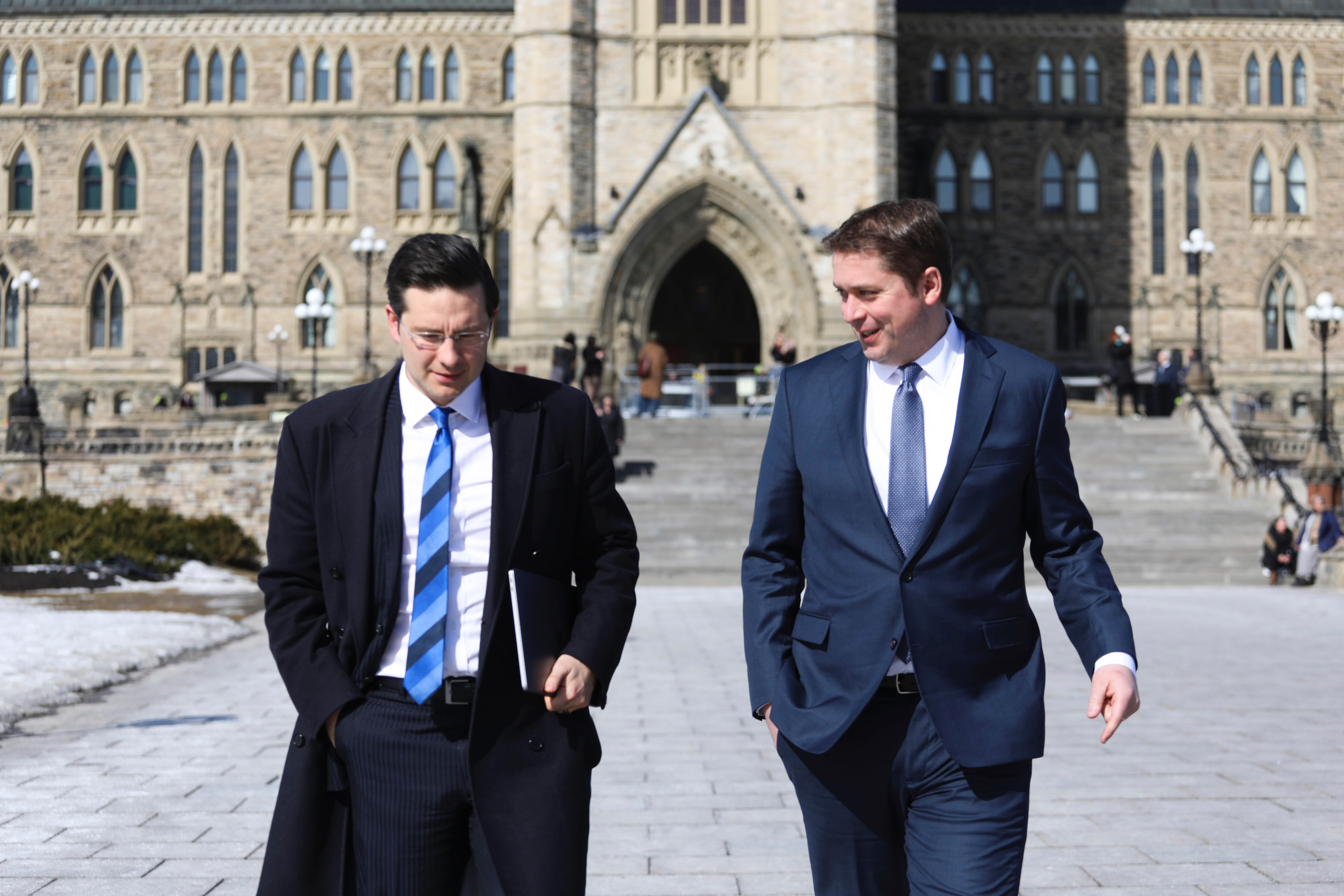
Poilievre on Parliament Hill with then Conservative leader Andrew Scheer, February 2018

In August 2017, new party leader Andrew Scheer selected Poilievre to be critic of the Minister of Finance, with Tom Kmiec as deputy critic. In that role Poilievre introduced his third private member's bill (Bill C-395) which sought to amend the Federal–Provincial Arrangements Act in such a way that it would eliminate personal income taxes and payroll taxes that apply to persons with disabilities. Although it gained the support of the New Democratic Party (NDP), the bill was defeated at consider of 2nd Reading with both the Liberal Party and Bloc Québécois/Québec debout voting against. During this parliament, Poilievre travelled to Dieppe as part of a Canadian delegation to commemorate the 75th anniversary ceremonies of the Dieppe Raid. In the lead-up to the next election, Poilievre used all the House of Commons time allotted for debating the 2019 Canadian federal budget to deliver one 4-day long speech to remark upon the SNC-Lavalin affair.

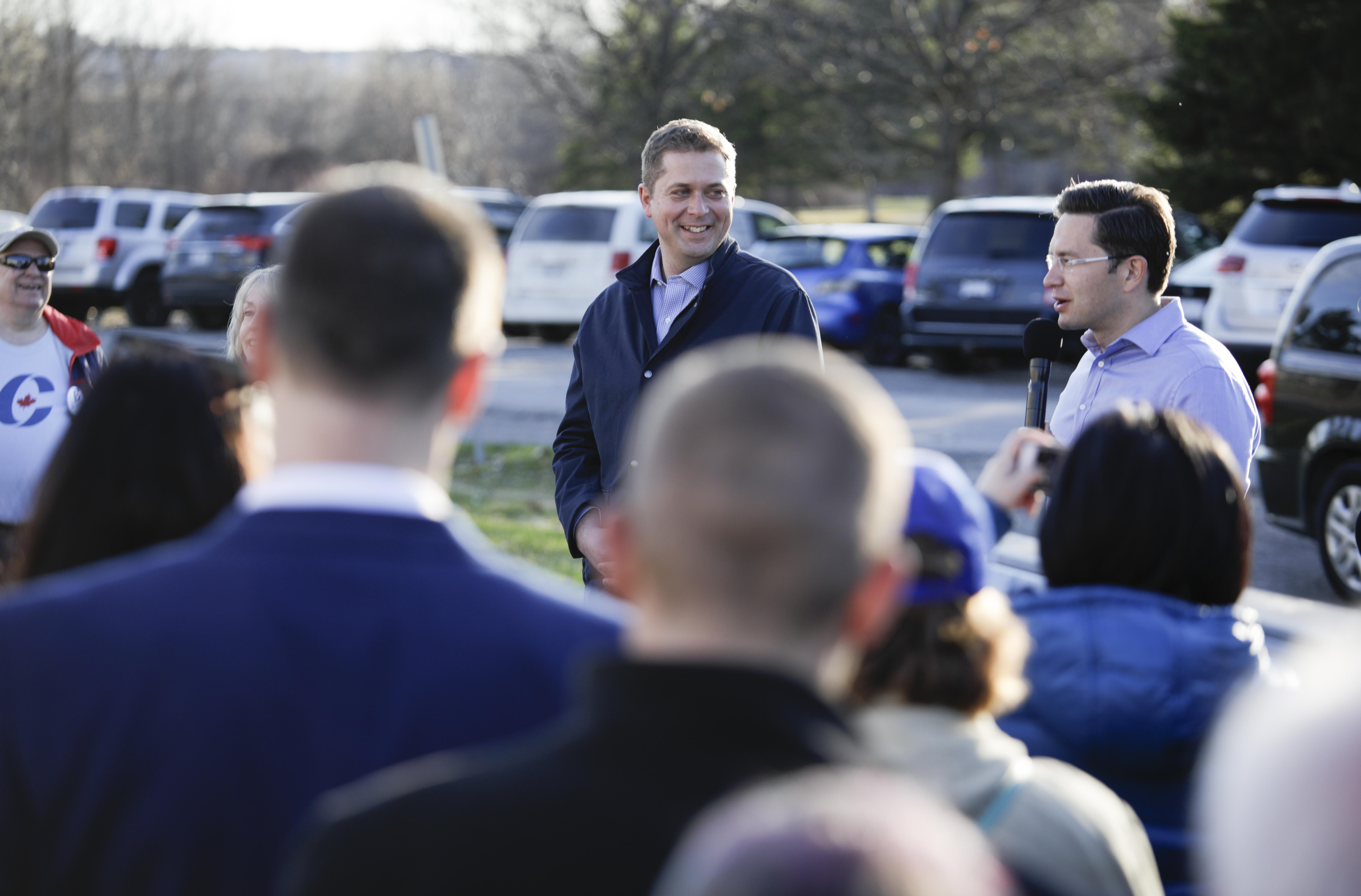
Poilievre speaking at a canvassing event for the Conservative Party, April 2019

Poilievre was re-elected in 2019 to the 43rd Canadian Parliament, this time by a wider margin of the vote compared to his 2015 victory. After Scheer's resignation as party leader, Poilievre was initially considered to be one of the front-runners to win the subsequent leadership election. Poilievre considered a bid and started to assemble a campaign team, though he announced he would not run on January 23, 2020, citing his desire to spend more time with his family.

During the WE Charity scandal surrounding the Liberal Party, Poilievre was one of the Conservative Party's primary interrogators. Poilievre repeatedly questioned Prime Minister Trudeau in a virtual conference in July, asking for the exact dollar figure that his family was paid by the WE Charity. Trudeau responded that he did not know the number on hand. In August, Poilievre revealed to journalists WE Charity memos that had been blacked-out by the Liberal government, tossing each of them aside. After Poilievre pressured Finance Minister Bill Morneau to resign for his involvement in the scandal, Morneau announced his resignation on August 17.

When Bill C-10 (An Act to amend the Broadcasting Act) was introduced, Poilievre opposed it alongside the rest of the Conservative caucus. He described the bill as "censorship" and used his social media to start an online petition against the bill. Scheer's successor, Erin O'Toole, kept Poilievre as finance critic until February 10, 2021, when he was replaced with Ed Fast. Poilievre then became critic for jobs and industry, though he only held this position for a short time as he regained his old position as finance critic on November 9, 2021.

==== 2022 leadership election ====
Poilievre won re-election in Carleton in the 2021 federal election to the 44th Canadian Parliament. After O'Toole was ousted as leader through a leadership review on February 2, 2022, there was speculation of Poilievre entering the leadership election to succeed him. On February 5, 2022, Poilievre implicitly declared his intention to run in the leadership election, stating "I'm running for Prime Minister". Political commentators and journalists described Poilievre as the frontrunner in the leadership race. Poilievre's campaign was described as being centred on freedom and reducing the cost of living. He stated his desire to make Canada the "freest country in the world".

Poilievre had been critical of fellow leadership candidates Jean Charest and Patrick Brown, who were seen to be part of the moderate faction of the Conservative Party; Poilievre accused Charest of being a Liberal and stated that Brown's support for a carbon tax is "disqualifying". From the end of June to early July, Poilievre's campaign aired attack ads on Brown in local Toronto television stations, criticizing his policies as mayor of Brampton. Poilievre's campaign paid the legal fees of a whistleblower who claimed that Brown had broken election laws, leading to Brown's disqualification from the race.

Poilievre flipping pancakes at the Calgary Stampede, July 2022

On June 4, Poilievre's campaign announced they sold 311,958 out of the 678,708 total memberships during the leadership race. Poilievre had been endorsed for the leadership by 62 Conservative MPs, more than half of the party's then 119-member caucus in the House of Commons. On July 25, Poilievre received an endorsement from former Prime Minister Stephen Harper. On August 2, Poilievre's campaign announced they fundraised $4,042,717 through 36,804 individual donors in the second quarter of the leadership race; this amount was more than half of the $7,538,549 fundraised by the six candidates combined. On September 10, Poilievre won the leadership on the first ballot, with 68.15% of points and 70.7% of the vote share. It was the first first-ballot victory since the party's 2004 leadership election. Poilievre also won 330 out of 338 electoral districts.

During the 2025 Canadian election campaign, Robert Fife of The Globe and Mail reported that the CSIS believed that agents affiliated with government of India assisted Poilievre's leadership bid in 2022 by fundraising and organizing support for Poilievre. While the agency did not believe it would impact the result of the leadership race, they believe agents did it as part of a campaign to gain support from politicians in all parties and Poilievre's decision not to obtain a security clearance prevented him from being notified of this information. Poilievre responded by defending his decision not to obtain a security clearance.

== Leader of the Conservative Party (2022–present) ==
=== 44th Parliament ===
On September 12, Poilievre gave his first speech to his caucus as leader. The following day on September 13, he unveiled his House of Commons leadership team with nine members, including new deputy leaders Melissa Lantsman and Tim Uppal. On October 12, Poilievre unveiled a 71-member shadow cabinet, including former leadership rivals Leslyn Lewis and Scott Aitchison.

In October 2022, the Conservatives under Poilievre voted in favour of the Liberal government's Bill C-30 (which doubled the goods and services tax rebate) but voted against Bill C-31 (which introduced a public dental care program for children under 12 in low income families and a one-time allowance worth $500 for low-income renters), citing concerns that the level of spending in the latter bill's measures would increase inflation. In November 2022, Poilievre and the Conservatives put forward a motion to audit federal COVID-19 spending, including the ArriveCAN app. The motion passed resulting in an audit of the federal government's spending. The auditor found that "overpayments of $4.6 billion were made to ineligible individuals" and "at least $27.4 billion in payments to individuals and employers" to be further investigated. In December, Liberal MPs criticized the audit for being done for partisan reasons and "political games" while Conservative MPs defended the independence of the auditor.

In January 2023, Poilievre called for a parliamentary probe into the Liberal government's relationship with McKinsey & Company due to a report showing value of federal contracts increased from $2.2 million to $66 million after the Liberals formed government. On June 19, 2023, Poilievre and his caucus voted in support of the Liberal government's legislation for long term funding to a Canada-wide early learning and child-care system.

In November 2023, Poilievre and the Conservative caucus voted against a bill that implements an update to a free trade agreement with Ukraine. Poilievre said that his opposition was based on language that would "impose [Justin Trudeau's] carbon tax ideology onto those poor people", despite Ukraine already having a price on carbon and the urging of the Ukrainian ambassador to pass the bill. Liberal government house leader Karina Gould described the reasoning as a "red herring," and the president of the Ukrainian Canadian Congress called on the Conservative Party to rethink their position.

On April 30, 2024, Poilievre was ejected from the House of Commons after referring to Trudeau as a "wacko prime minister", when criticizing Trudeau's past support for British Columbia's decriminalization of hard drug use in public spaces. After Poilievre refused to withdraw the adjective, House Speaker Greg Fergus removed Poilievre from the chamber on the grounds that he used unparliamentary language.

On June 12, 2024, the National Security and Intelligence Committee of Parliamentarians released a report on foreign interference by the governments such as India and China in Canadian elections such as the 2022 Conservative Party of Canada leadership election. It also mentioned that some members of parliament were witting participants in foreign-interference efforts. Poilievre demanded that the names of the member of parliament should be publicly released. Previously, Poilievre has resisted any attempts in obtaining a security clearance since becoming leader and this report did not change his mind because he believes that the clearance would be used to silence his criticism of the government on this issues. In October 2024, Prime Minister Trudeau told the foreign interference commission that he has seen the names of Conservative parliamentarians and candidates who were a clear risk of foreign interference and directed the Canadian Security Intelligence Service to pass that information along to Poilievre, but said Poilievre's lack of security clearance prevent him from seeing this information. Poilievre responded by accusing Trudeau of lying and demanded that the prime minister release the names.

==== Other events ====
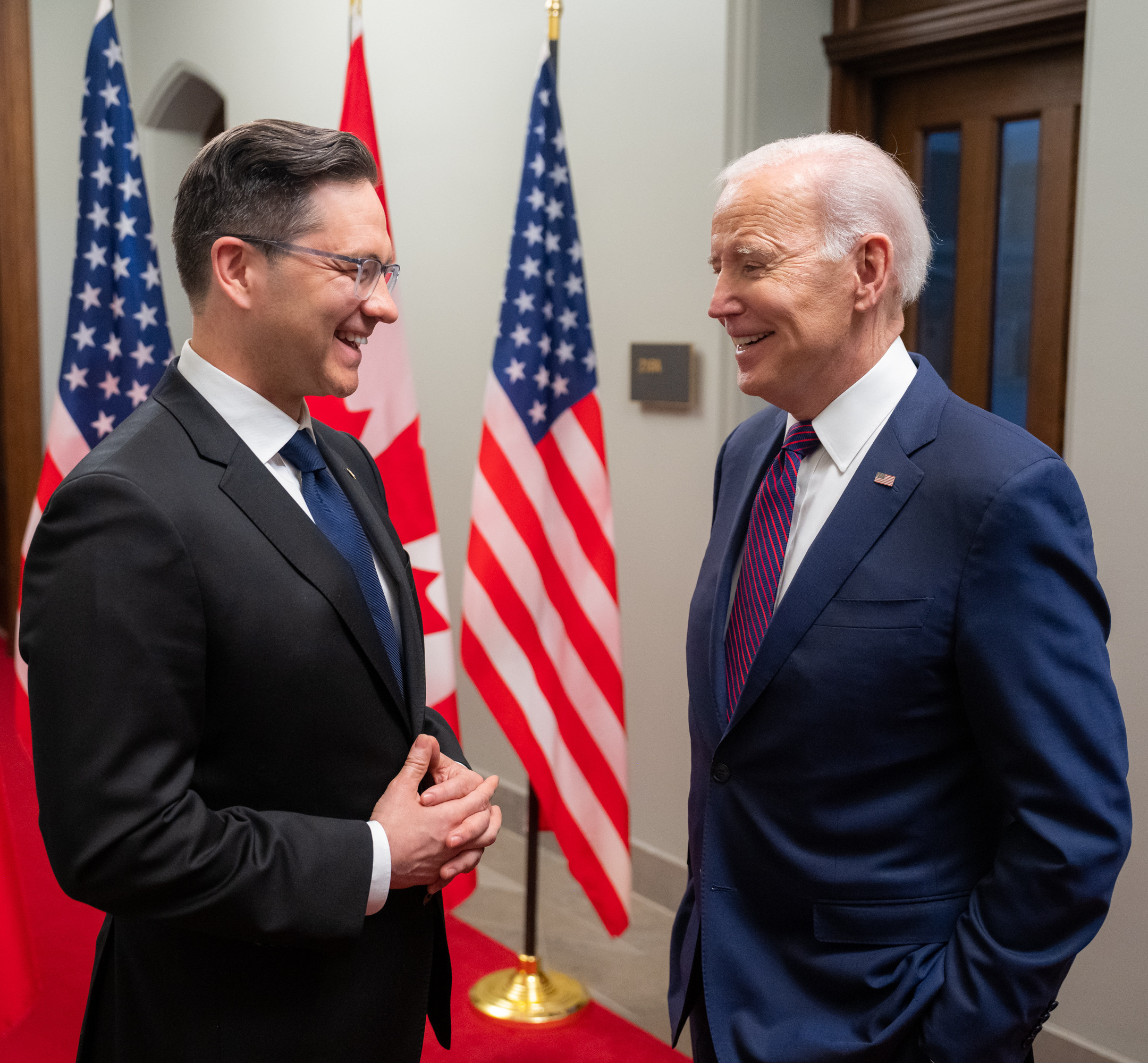
Poilievre speaks with then US president Joe Biden during his official visit to Canada, March 2023

On October 6, 2022, it was reported that between 2018 and 2022, Poilievre's team-managed YouTube channel posted hundreds of videos with a hidden tag labelled "MGTOW", referencing the misogynistic online community. Poilievre condemned MGTOW, said he was unaware of the tags, and had his team immediately remove the tags. Responding to a reporter's question on June 27, 2023, Poilievre criticized Trudeau for weighing in on New Brunswick's Policy 713 regarding LGBT students, calling it a "provincial policy" and saying that "The prime minister has no business in decisions that should rest with provinces and parents".

In September 2023, a video posted on social media showed Poilievre going door-knocking in suburban neighbourhoods to support his campaign for the next election. In the video, Poilievre can be heard agreeing with a woman that Justin Trudeau's father, Pierre Trudeau, "put [Canada] down", then adding himself that both Justin and Pierre Trudeau are "Marxists".

On October 20, 2023, in an emailed statement, Poilievre "encouraged Albertans to stay in the CPP" amidst ongoing debate in Alberta on whether to leave the Canada Pension Plan. Poilievre stated that "The division today on the CPP is entirely the result of Justin Trudeau attacking the Alberta economy".

==== By-elections and opinion polling ====
Under Poilievre's leadership, the Conservatives won six by-elections, with four retained seats, (Note: Oxford, Portage—Lisgar, Calgary Heritage, and Durham.) and two gained seats. (Note: Toronto–St. Paul's and Cloverdale—Langley City.) On June 24, 2024, the Conservatives won the previously Liberal-held riding of Toronto—St. Paul's in a federal by-election, marking the first time under Poilievre's leadership that the Conservatives won a riding that was previously held by another party. This particular by-election victory gained national attention, as the Liberal Party had held the riding since the 1993 Canadian federal election. The Conservatives won another former Liberal seat in Cloverdale—Langley City on December 16, 2024. Poilievre's first year as leader saw the Conservatives holding a narrow lead over the Liberals according to most opinion polls. During the summer of 2023, the Conservatives experienced a surge in polling support, with their lead increasing to double-digit margins. Most pollsters began writing off the Liberals at this point, with most of them projecting a decisive Conservative victory had Trudeau led them into the election. Poilievre made repeated calls for a general election. The Conservative polling lead disappeared after Trudeau's resignation in January 2025 and the election of Mark Carney as Liberal leader in March. This period also coincided with Trump advancing plans to tariff Canada, a development believed to have disadvantaged Poilievre and advanced the Liberals' standing with the Canadian electorate.

=== 2025 federal election ===
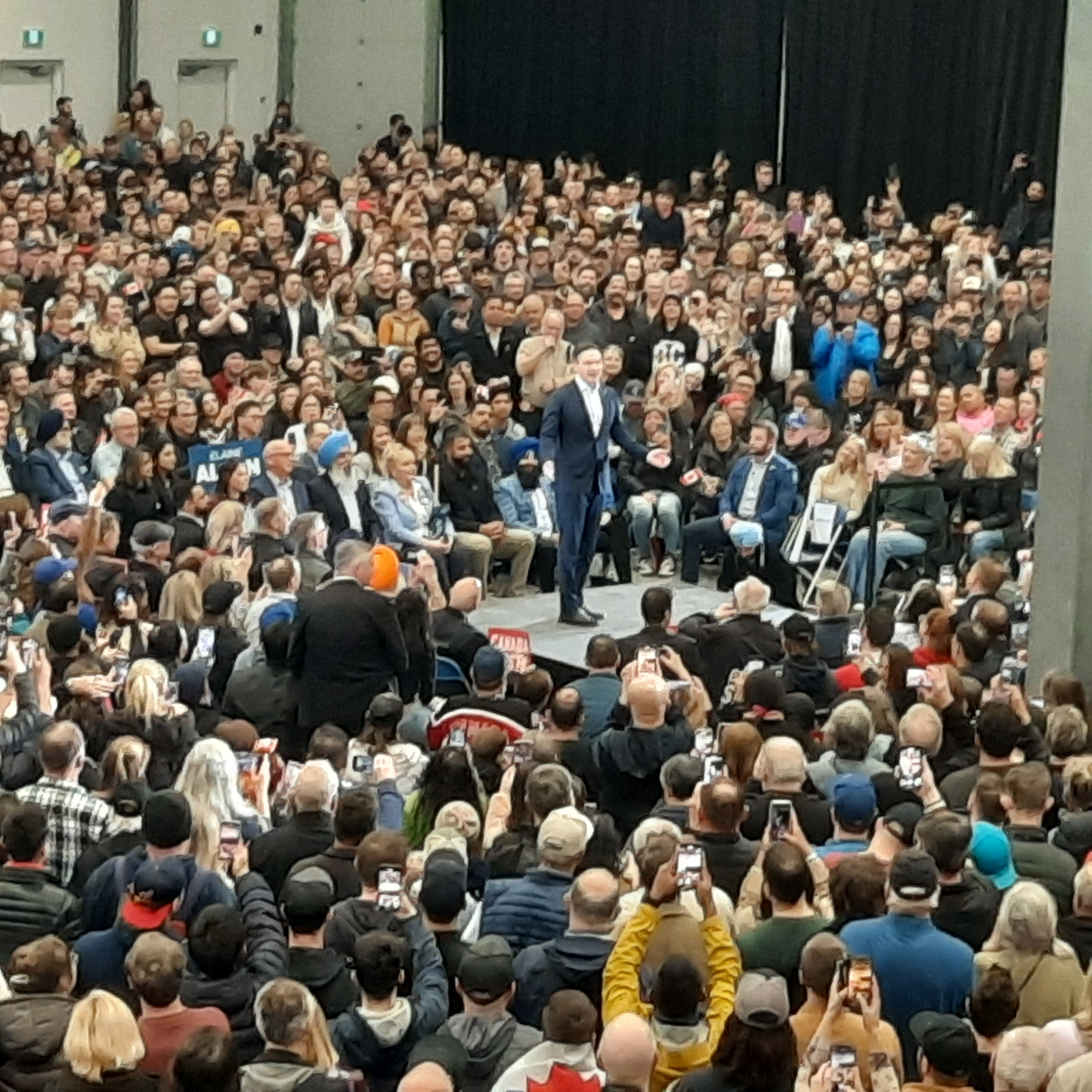
Poilievre at a campaign rally in Surrey, British Columbia, March 2025

On March 23, Carney visited Governor General Mary Simon and asked to dissolve parliament and call an election for April 28, ahead of the required election date in October. Poilievre entered the election trailing Carney's Liberal Party in most opinion polls. During the campaign, he promised that his government would reduce the lowest income tax bracket from 15% to 12.75% and invoke Section 33 of the Canadian Charter of Rights and Freedoms, also known as the notwithstanding clause, to overturn R v Bissonnette and restore judges' discretion to order parole ineligibility periods for multiple murders be served consecutively.

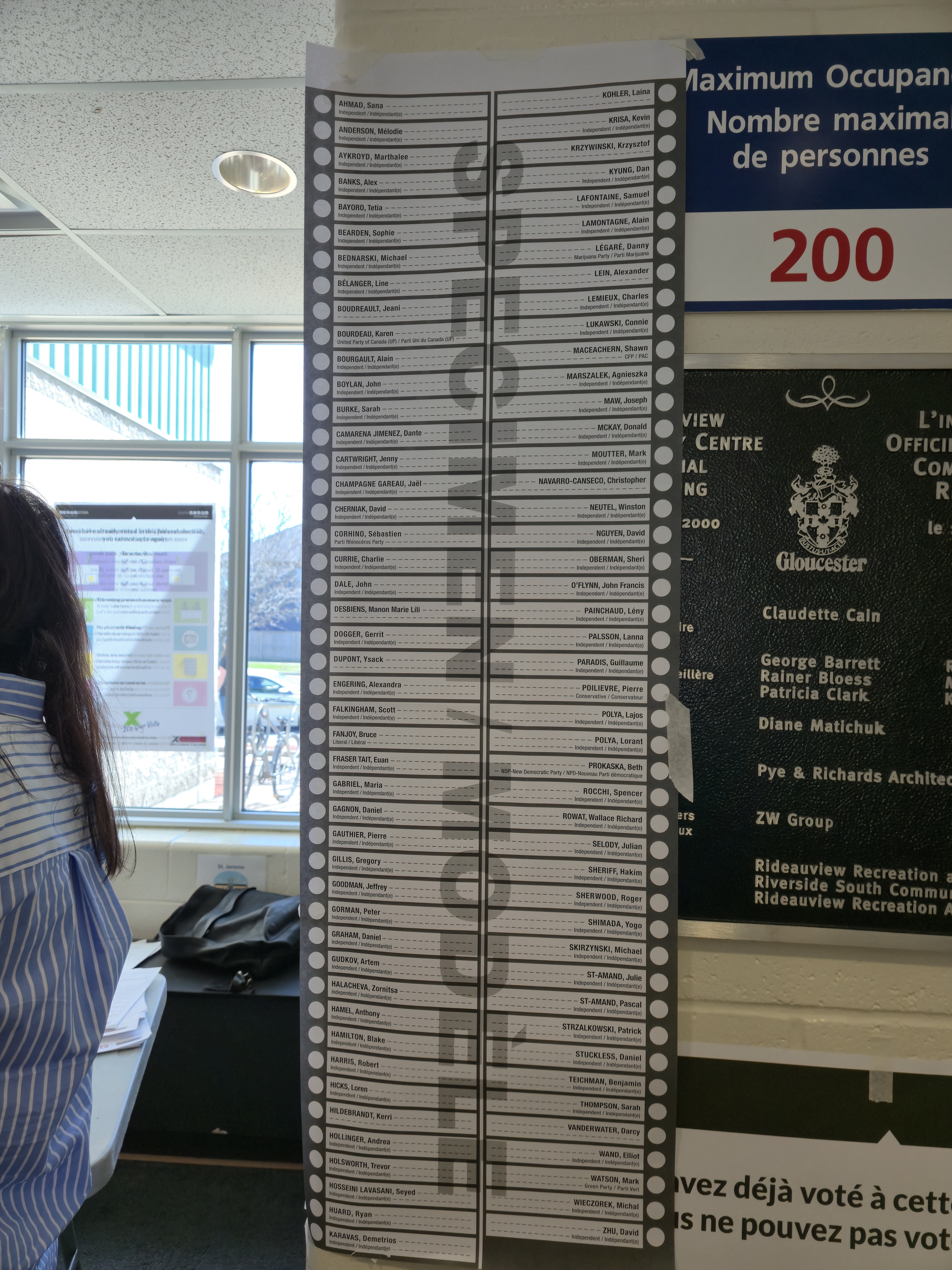
An election ballot for Carleton during the 2025 Canadian federal election, with 91 candidates, including Poilievre, listed on the ballot

In the election, Poilievre lost his seat of Carleton to Liberal candidate Bruce Fanjoy, one of the few times a major party leader in Canada has been defeated in his own riding. Poilievre received 39,585 votes for a vote share of around 46%, while Fanjoy received 43,900 votes for a vote share of around 51%. There were a record-equaling 91 candidates in Poilievre's Carleton riding in 2025, due to the Longest Ballot Committee encouraging adding candidates to promote independent election reforms. Poilievre conceded the election and congratulated Prime Minister Mark Carney in his speech.

Shortly after the election, Conservative MP Damien Kurek, re-elected with over 80% of the vote in the Alberta riding of Battle River—Crowfoot, one of the party's safest ridings, resigned in order to allow Poilievre to run in the succeeding by-election. Prime Minister Carney stated that the by-election would be held as soon as possible. Kurek intends to run in the Battle River—Crowfoot riding in the next general election. Until Poilievre returned to the House, he was ineligible to continue as Leader of the Opposition. He continued to lead the Conservatives outside of Parliament until he won the August 18th by-election; former Conservative leader Andrew Scheer was appointed interim parliamentary leader, and hence Leader of the Opposition, at least until the by-election. By law, Kurek could not resign until 30 days after the publication of the election result in the Canada Gazette, which occurred on May 15, 2025. Additionally, while Carney promised to advise Simon to issue the writ for a by-election as quickly as possible, it could not be dropped sooner than 11 days and no later than 180 days after the chief electoral officer is officially notified of a vacancy via a warrant issued by the Speaker. Under the Canada Elections Act, the minimum length of a campaign is 36 days between dropping the writ and election day. Kurek officially resigned on June 17. Simon issued the writ on June 30, for a by-election date of August 18, 2025.

=== 45th Parliament ===
Poilievre spoke as party leader on May 13 stating that he would look for common ground with the Liberal government and that he wanted them to continue to "steal" his ideas, referencing proposals on the carbon tax among other issues. On May 25, Poilievre reaffirmed that he would work with the government to end the United States trade war with Canada and informed Prime Minister Mark Carney that he and his party were "happy to cooperate any way we can". On June 20, Poilievre's Conservatives voted in favour of Liberal Bill C-5, which aimed to remove interprovincial trade barriers.

On August 18, Poilievre returned to Parliament by winning the Battle River—Crowfoot by-election with almost 81 percent of the vote. No other candidates reached 10 percent, and the Liberals dropped to third place behind independent Bonnie Critchley.

Before returning for the fall session of the 45th Parliament, Poilievre proposed introducing three Conservative bills, the Canadian Sovereignty Act, the Stand on Guard Act, and the Jail Not Bail Act.

In October, he claimed that scandals under the Trudeau government should have resulted in jail time for the then-Prime Minister, that the RCMP covered it up, and that former RCMP commissioner Brenda Lucki was "despicable" and participated in "deception and political interference" in favour of the Liberal government. Other parties called in the House of Commons for him to apologize, but he doubled down and asserted the Liberal party was "trying to distract from their inflation, rising cost of living, by talking about their corruption". Poilievre's office saw the departure of Jenni Byrne as his campaign manager and the appointment of Steve Outhouse in November 2025. After the presentation of the 2025 federal budget, Conservative MP Chris d'Entremont crossed the floor to join the Liberal caucus, citing issues with Poilievre's leadership. This was followed by three more defections to the Liberal caucus: Michael Ma on December 11, Matt Jeneroux on February 18, 2026, and Marilyn Gladu on April 8. Quebec MP Richard Martel was nominated to the Senate by Carney on July 7; the seat was lost to the Liberals in an August by-election. Poilievre responded by accusing Carney of using "dirty backroom deals" to secure a majority government, and said he personally supported the automatic triggering of a recall petition following a floor crossing.

In January 2026, Poilievre strongly criticized Carney’s new "strategic partnership" with China, characterizing it as a significant policy reversal that posed a threat to Canada's national security. He accused Carney of misleading voters, noting that during the spring 2025 election campaign, Carney described China as Canada’s "biggest security threat". He also criticized Carney's trade agreement with China, asserting that it threatens Canadian auto industry jobs. Poilievre argued the deal offers too many concessions for uncertain gains. At the party's convention in Calgary that month, Poilievre received 87.4% support in a leadership review vote. This vote broke the record for the party as he became the single most popular leader in the Conservative Party, breaking Stephen Harper's leadership review record in 2005 when he received 84% support. On June 30, 2026, Poilievre reshuffled his shadow cabinet. In July 2026, Poilievre sparked controversy among some senior conservatives for criticizing the organizers behind Caroline Elliott's bid for the leadership of the Conservative Party of British Columbia, describing them as "liberal lobbyists."

== Political positions ==
Poilievre has described himself as a "true conservative", and is widely considered to be part of the Blue Tory faction within the party. Journalists have described him as "libertarian" as well as "populist". He has largely campaigned on economic issues, calling for Canada to be the "freest country on Earth".

=== Economic policy ===
Poilievre argues that large budget deficits are the reason for rising inflation. Poilievre proposes implementing a pay-as-you-go law, requiring the government to offset any new spending with a cut elsewhere. He referred to the success of pay-as-you-go balancing the budget in the United States under the Clinton administration. Poilievre owns and uses cryptocurrency, and purchased a shawarma in London, Ontario, with Bitcoin to show support for it. He supports normalizing cryptocurrencies including Bitcoin, which he believes is an inflation hedge. He stated he wants to make Canada the "blockchain capital of the world" and believed the Justin Trudeau government was bringing down the value of the Canadian dollar.

Poilievre has criticized the Bank of Canada, accusing it of being "financially illiterate" for forecasting that there would be deflation as opposed to inflation, after his warning to them about inflation in 2020. The bank's deputy governor Paul Beaudry responded by stating "The aspect that we should be held accountable is exactly right", and also listed the Russian invasion of Ukraine and supply-chain bottlenecks due to the COVID-19 pandemic as the most significant influences on inflation. Poilievre has said that the bank's governor Tiff Macklem, is Prime Minister Trudeau's "personal ATM" in terms of printing money to fund deficit spending for the pandemic. Poilievre stated that a government led by him would dismiss Macklem, audit the bank, and ban the bank's potential digital currency.

Poilievre has pledged to cut personal income taxes. Following the Rogers-Shaw merger, Poilievre stated that Canada needed more telecommunications competition and proposed for there to be at least "four competitors in every single marketplace". Poilievre supports defunding the Canadian Broadcasting Corporation (CBC), stating the federal government could save a billion dollars, or 0.9% of the annual federal budget, by doing so. He has been a critic of what he believes to be biased support for the government within the CBC, referring to the CBC as the "biased propaganda arm of the Liberal Party" in a response to reporters in Edmonton in 2023; however, he would continue to support the CBC's French programming. He proposes to convert the CBC's headquarters into affordable housing and other federal buildings into condominium housing.

=== Labour policy ===
Poilievre has supported bringing right-to-work laws to Canada, and voted multiple times against reinstating and increasing the federal minimum wage to $15/hour. Poilievre supported the new replacement workers bill, also known as Bill C-58. The bill, introduced by the Liberal government, would ban the use of replacement workers during strikes and lock-outs in most federally regulated workplaces. In February 2024, Poilievre and his caucus voted alongside Liberal, NDP, and Bloc MPs in favour of Bill C-58, which banned replacement workers.

=== Housing and infrastructure ===
Poilievre stated that a government led by him would permit a runway expansion at Billy Bishop Toronto City Airport, allowing jets to fly in and out of the airport. Poilievre cited increased competition in the aviation industry and travellers being provided with an alternative to Toronto's Pearson International Airport which had dealt with congestion and flight delays surpassing 50% around the month of July 2022.

Poilievre blames bureaucracy for a lack of new housing and proposes requiring big cities with unaffordable housing to increase their number of new homes built by 15 per cent annually, in order to continue receiving full federal infrastructure money. Big cities that fail to keep up with the construction target would be withheld funds by the percentage they fall short, while those that meet the target would also be compensated up to $10,000 for every additional new home built. He also proposes compensating other smaller cities for building extra housing.

Poilievre plans to sell off 15 per cent of the government's 37,000 buildings he considers to be under-utilized, so that they can be converted into affordable housing instead. Poilievre has also criticized "wealthy investors who borrow it (money) and bid up housing prices". The Conservatives under Poilievre voted against Bill C-31 (which introduced a one-time affordability allowance worth $500 for low-income renters), citing inflation concerns. In September 2023, Poilievre put forward a bill aiming to increase homebuilding, titled Bill C-356 (Building Homes Not Bureaucracy Act).

On October 28, 2024, Poilievre proposed eliminating the GST on houses under $1 million while stating that it would save $40,000 on a $800,000 house and incentivize construction of 30,000 additional homes. Poilievre proposed to fund this GST elimination by cutting the Housing Accelerator Fund and the Housing Infrastructure Fund which he described as being unsuccessful in constructing infrastructure and homes.

In 2026, he announced that he supported the cancellation of the Alto high speed rail project between Toronto and Quebec City.

=== Environment and energy ===
Poilievre is in favour of addressing climate change by using green technology and placing targets to reduce carbon-related emissions, as opposed to using taxes. One of the technologies he plans to incentivize is carbon capture and storage. Poilievre also plans to increase the production of electric cars by greenlighting more mining of lithium, cobalt and copper required to produce the cars and batteries. When speaking in Quebec, he called for less "red tape" and stated that he would permit more construction of hydro-electric dams. Poilievre believes Canadian energy is cleaner than that of other countries, and proposes a ban on importing foreign oil and a review of all pipeline projects cancelled by the current government.

Poilievre pledges to repeal the Liberal government's carbon tax if the Conservatives form government under him, and has characterized the carbon tax as being "inflationary". Poilievre favours repealing two laws that he describes as "anti-energy": Oil Tanker Moratorium Act (a law prohibiting oil tankers of a certain size from docking along the north coast of British Columbia) and Impact Assessment Act (a law assessing Canada's environment). He also supports the Energy East pipeline.

=== Foreign policy ===
During the spring and summer of 2020, Poilievre was critical of what he perceived as the Trudeau government's misplaced trust in the Chinese Communist Party, which had cancelled CanSino's contract with Canada for its COVID vaccine, Convidecia. Poilievre insisted that Canada should create its own vaccine supply and make purchase agreements with more trustworthy governments. Following accounts in Canadian Security Intelligence Service documents of Chinese election interference, first reported by the Globe and Mail in 2023, Poilievre called for a public registry for agents of foreign governments who interfere in Canada's elections. According to Global Affairs Canada, Poilievre has been a target of the Chinese government's Spamouflage disinformation operations.

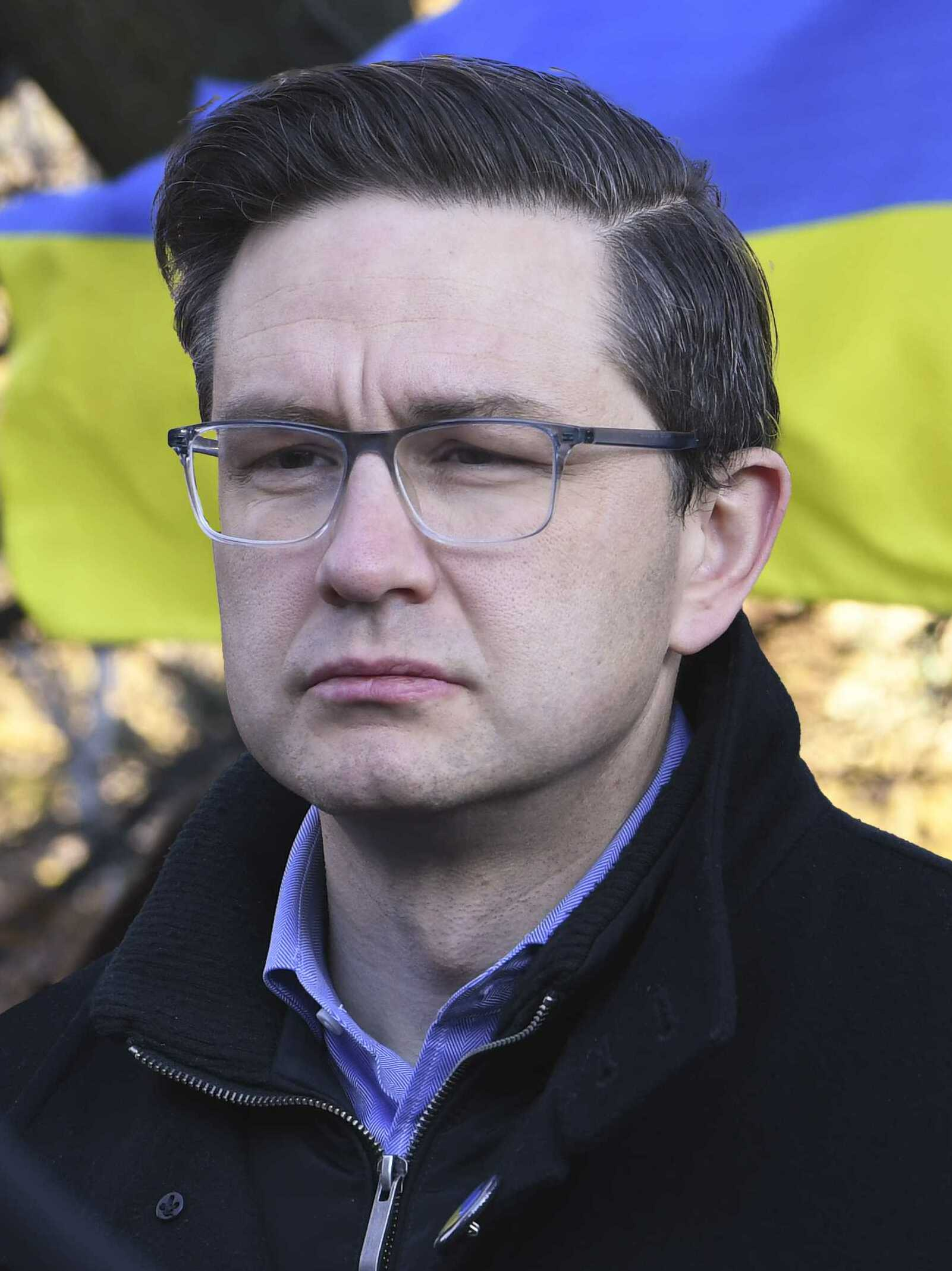
Poilievre attending a Holodomor memorial in Toronto, November 2022

In response to the Russian invasion of Ukraine, Poilievre stated that a government led by him would support Ukraine by bringing more Ukrainian refugees to Canada, by providing more weapons for Ukraine, and by supplying Europe with Canada's energy and oil through LNG Canada to help reduce Europe's dependency on energy from Russia. Poilievre disagreed with those advocating a no-fly zone for Ukraine, saying that he did not want to risk Canada going to war. Poilievre opposed the 2023 update to the Canada–Ukraine Free Trade Agreement, claiming that it imposed a "carbon tax"; he instead proposed sending CRV7 rockets to Ukraine as aid to be used against Russia. Poilievre confirmed his cuts to foreign aid would not apply to Ukraine and that the country would continue to receive funding. On the third anniversary of the Russian invasion, Poilievre insisted that any peace deal should involve Ukraine, and that its exclusion from agreements would be "unacceptable".

Poilievre said that a government led by him would ban his Cabinet ministers from participating in the World Economic Forum (WEF), stating that the forum "is against the interests of our people".

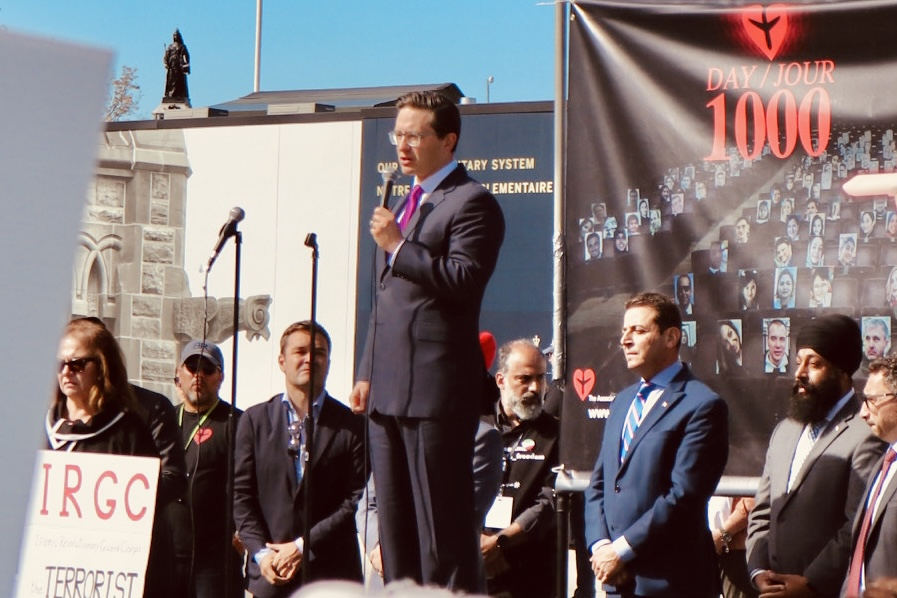
Poilievre spoke at a protest marking 1,000 days since the IRGC shot down UIA Flight 752, October 2022. During the event, he criticized the government for not designating the IRGC as a terrorist group.

Poilievre condemned the actions of Hamas during the 2023 Gaza war and stated that Israel has the right to defend itself. He criticized South Africa's genocide case against Israel, calling the accusation a shameless and dishonest attack on Jewish people and the Jewish state. In March 2024, Poilievre claimed his government would "defund antisemitism", and blamed the war on Iran, promising to ban the Islamic Revolutionary Guard Corps. After the Israel-Hamas war broke out, Poilievre repeatedly accused the Liberal government of speaking from both sides of their mouth for political gain by "sending one group into synagogues to say one thing to Canadian Jews, and then send another group of MPs to mosques to say exactly the opposite to Canadian Muslims", arguing that Canada like all countries only gets one vote at the United Nations and therefore a government can only take one position on every foreign policy issue. During his speech at a Montreal-area synagogue in March 2024, Poilievre spoke for a "negotiated two-state solution to the Israeli–Palestinian conflict, with Palestinians and Israelis living in peace and harmony, and where all of the Abrahamic peoples have unhindered access to their places of worship on the holy land." Additionally, he stated that a government led by him would stand up for Israel's right to defend itself and that he would reject any anti-Israel motions and resolutions at the United Nations. He also stated that as prime minister, his government would defund UNWRA and ensure that "Canadian aid actually goes to the suffering Palestinian people and not to those promoting terrorism in UNRWA". Lastly, Poilievre declared that "common sense Conservatives under his leadership will be cutting back foreign aid to terrorist dictators and multinational bureaucracies and using the money to rebuild the Canadian Armed Forces."

In 2026, Pierre Poilievre strongly supported U.S. and Israeli war against Iran, labeling the Iranian regime a "terror" entity.

==== Donald Trump ====
Some critics claim that Pierre Poilievre has demonstrated alignment with Donald Trump on certain issues, while several journalists have dismissed comparisons to Trump due to Poilievre's positions on immigration, socialized healthcare, and support for abortion rights. Poilievre himself has consistently rejected comparisons to the U.S. president.

After Donald Trump won the 2024 United States presidential election in November, Poilievre had called for retaliatory tariffs against Trump's tariffs. He also proposed incentivizing more interprovincial Canadian trade with standardized rules for truck drivers and to return additional tax revenue as bonuses to provinces that remove barriers. In response to Trump's comments of Canada being the "51st state", Poilievre stated "Canada will never be the 51st state" and for Trump to "back off".

Prior to the implementation of Trump's tariffs, Poilievre was willing to negotiate and had proposed increasing Canada's exports to the U.S., particularly in energy sectors such as liquefied natural gas (LNG) and electricity, suggesting that these initiatives could lead to mutually beneficial agreements. Following the implementation of the tariffs, Poilievre proposed using LNG to trade more with Europe and Asia instead of America, describing it as a way to stand up to Trump.

He has echoed a similar phrase to "America First" by advocating for a "Canada First" approach, emphasizing the importance of strengthening Canada's economy through tax reductions, promoting free enterprise, and boosting energy and resource production. This phrase as used by Pierre Poilievre was done with reference to the phrase by former Canadian prime minister Wilfrid Laurier.

On April 29, Poilievre conceded that he lost the election, congratulated Prime Minister Mark Carney, and stated that he would work with all parties to reach a new trade deal that would end Donald Trump's tariffs. Canadian journalists described the concession as an example of Canada's successful democracy and contrasted it from the turmoil surrounding elections in the United States.

=== Social issues ===
Poilievre supports abortion rights and access to abortion in Canada. He stated that a government led by him would not introduce and would not pass any legislation restricting access to abortion, though he would allow his caucus to have free votes on legislation. In 2010, he supported a bill that would have criminalized pressuring a person to get an abortion and a motion where Parliament would have studied when a fetus should be considered a human. In 2020, he changed his position and said that a government led by him would never introduce a bill on the topic, and no private ones would be adopted. In 2021, Poilievre opposed a private member bill prohibiting sex-selective abortion.

Poilievre supports same-sex marriage after previously opposing it; in a 2020 interview, he called it a "success" and stated: "I voted against it 15 years ago. But I learned a lot." In 2005, he gave a speech opposing same-sex marriage while favouring civil unions as an alternative and voted in favour on the motion to introduce legislation to reinstate an opposite-sex only definition of marriage in 2006. He had also requested Finance Minister Jim Flaherty withhold money spent on sex reassignment surgery from Canada Health Transfer payments. In 2021, Poilievre voted in favour of banning conversion therapy in a free vote.

In September 2023, Poilievre accused Trudeau of "demonizing concerned parents" after the prime minister released a statement in support of LGBTQ+ Canadians on Twitter in response to anti-gender movement protests. Poilievre's comments were condemned from the executive director of LGBTQ+ advocacy group Egale Canada. In February 2024, when asked by reporters for his views on Premier of Alberta Danielle Smith's transgender legislation and if he was against minors under 18 using puberty blockers to support medical gender transition, Poilievre affirmed his support for the decision. In response to reporters asking if he believes transgender women should be allowed in women's change rooms and washrooms, Poilievre stated that "Female spaces should be exclusively for females, not for biological males"; however, he also stated that federal jurisdiction would not have the reach to legislate on the matter. In January 2025, when asked if he agreed with Donald Trump's executive order which stated that the United States federal government will only recognize two genders, male and female, Poilievre said that he was only aware of two genders, but added that "we should have a government that just minds its own damn business and leaves people alone to make their own personal decisions. That's the kind of government I'm going to run." Several Canadian LGBT rights organizations denounced Poilievre's comments for denying the existence of transgender people. Poilievre has decried "woke culture".

Poilievre supports maintaining the legalization of soft drugs such as marijuana, while he opposes the decriminalization of "hard drugs", stating: "We're not talking about marijuana here, we're talking about highly lethal drugs that can stop a person's heart." This is after previously voting against the legalization of marijuana in 2017. He advocated for more treatment and recovery for those suffering from addictions which are "deadly" and that drug dealers should be facing "strong policing & tough sentences". Poilievre plans to fund treatment and recovery for addicts by suing the pharmaceutical companies responsible for the opioid epidemic.

=== Constitutional issues ===
Poilievre stated that he is in favour of freedom of expression and seeks to repeal Bill C-11 (Online Streaming Act) and the successor to Bill C-36 (Act to amend the Criminal Code and the Canadian Human Rights Act), describing them as censorship. Poilievre plans to remove the proposed "digital safety commissioner" position with the introduction of what he titles as the Free Speech Act and would leave enforcement of crimes committed online to law enforcement. Poilievre stated a government led by him would scrap direct federal research and other grants to universities if they do not commit to section 2(b) of the Charter of Rights and Freedoms, which protects freedom of expression. Poilievre also stated he would appoint a 'Free Speech Guardian' (on the condition that they are a former judge) that would ensure compliance to section 2(b), investigate claims of academic censorship, report to the federal government on the universities that refuse to uphold the Charter right, and recommend cuts to direct federal grants to universities that do not uphold the right.

Poilievre announced his support of those in the Canada convoy protest who were protesting peacefully, while denouncing individuals who were seen as promoting extremism. Poilievre believes that the federal government abused its power by invoking the Emergencies Act during the convoy protests and proposes limiting its power to prevent it from being used similarly in the future.

Amid the 2026 Alberta independence referendum, Poilievre spoke in support of the "remain in Canada" option, but stated that those who do support independence "are not our enemies."

=== Immigration ===
In 2022, Poilievre described himself as pro-immigration and put forward policies aiming to speed up processing times to reunite families, keep refugees safe, and get jobs filled in Canada. Poilievre stated that a government led by him would negotiate agreements with provinces to license qualified professionals within 60 days of receiving applications, provide study loans to aid new immigrants in passing examinations, and permit immigrants to receive licences before moving to Canada. Poilievre proposes establishing direct flights to Amritsar, India. In June 2023, Poilievre, as well as NDP leader Jagmeet Singh, joined protesters in support of students who were facing deportation for being scammed into moving to Canada on fake admission letters to universities.

Poilievre has since argued that Canada should pursue reductions on immigration and asylum intake. In 2024, he described Liberal Party's approach to immigration as "radical and out of control" and argued Trudeau's government has "destroyed our immigration system". Poilievre argued that before Trudeau became prime minister, Canada maintained a multi-generational consensus on immigration, bringing in immigrants at a level that the housing market, job market, and healthcare system could absorb. After data published by the Immigration and Refugee Board of Canada (IRBC) showed a substantial rise in asylum cases from Mexico, Poilievre called on the Canadian government to reinstate visa requirements for Mexico which had been imposed by previous Conservative government before Trudeau abolished this policy in 2016. In January 2024, Poilievre argued that the removal of visa requirements had led to an increase in immigration fraud and abuses of the asylum process.

In 2024, Poilievre stated that if he became prime minister he would significantly reduce the numbers of asylum seekers and temporary residents, citing the high amount of new arrivals compared to Canada's housing supply. During a June 2024 speech in Quebec, Poilievre said that current levels of immigration into Canada are too high and in government he would link immigration numbers to the number of homes built, citing lack of accommodations and the capacity of the healthcare system to support current migrant numbers. Poilievre also spoke in favour of smaller population growth by mitigating immigration numbers and in June 2025 stated that Canada needs "more people leaving than coming for the next couple years."

Poilievre has called for a tougher policy against illegal immigration and has accused the Trudeau government of allowing illegal border crossings at Roxham Road to continue. In 2023, he stated irregular border crossing points should be closed and loopholes allowing illegal migration to be ended by amending the "Safe Third Country Agreement". In October 2024, he stated that a Conservative government under his leadership would introduce further border control and background screening measures of immigrants to stop foreign citizens with criminal and terrorism convictions from entering Canada. In June 2025, Poilievre stated that the "border has been left wide open" and that it has caused "the free flow of drugs, illegal migration, human trafficking and much worse."

In an interview with Juno News, Pierre Poilievre said that under his Conservative government he would go back to Stephen Harper era's Permanent Residence numbers of around 200k-250k and deport those who overstay on their temporary visa. Saying that "It will be a lot more like the Harper era numbers that were the same basically for 40 years before Trudeau took office. We were bringing around 200-250k a year in citizens". Down from the previously planned 500,000 Permanent Residence numbers from the Liberal government, in which they faced criticism for worsening Canada's housing crisis, putting pressure on Trudeau to state "we didn't get the balance quite right", and announcing reduced numbers of 395k to 365k from 2025–2027, higher than what Poilievre pledged.

In September 2025, Poilievre proposed ending the Temporary Foreign Worker Program. On September 9, Poilievre stated that he does not blame the immigrants or the temporary foreign workers but instead blames government policies. On the following day, he further stated "The international students and foreign workers themselves, they’re great people [...] But the Liberal government has so totally screwed up our immigration system".

=== Healthcare ===
Poilievre supports Canada's public healthcare system, stating: "I believe everybody should be able to get public health care. That's the system I've relied on my whole life." Poilievre plans to address healthcare shortages in Canada by implementing interprovincial standardization for doctors and nurses which he would call the "Blue Seal" program and also by ensuring provinces expedite the approval of professional credentials of certified immigrants to increase the number of health care providers. Poilievre pledged to uphold Prime Minister Trudeau's healthcare funding set in 2023 for the provinces but shared provincial premiers' criticisms of the funding being too low and he blamed Trudeau for overspending elsewhere.

In June 2022, Poilievre introduced private members Bill C-278, Prevention of Government-imposed Vaccination Mandates Act, which would end federally enforced COVID-19 vaccine mandates. In October 2022, Poilievre voted in support of a Conservative private member's bill to amend the Criminal Code, prohibiting the act of coercing health professionals to euthanize patients in medical assistance in dying, with the aim of upholding "freedom of conscience" in section 2(a) of the Charter of Rights and Freedoms. The bill was defeated when all Liberal, NDP, and Bloc members voted against it.

=== Firearms ===
Poilievre opposes re-establishing the long-gun registry, and opposes the May 1, 2020, and December 5, 2024, Orders in Council, which banned over 1,324 models of firearms. Poilievre states that the best civilian firearms policy for Canada is to improve policing of gun smuggling and is opposed to placing further restrictions on licensed firearms owners and sports shooters.

== Personal life ==
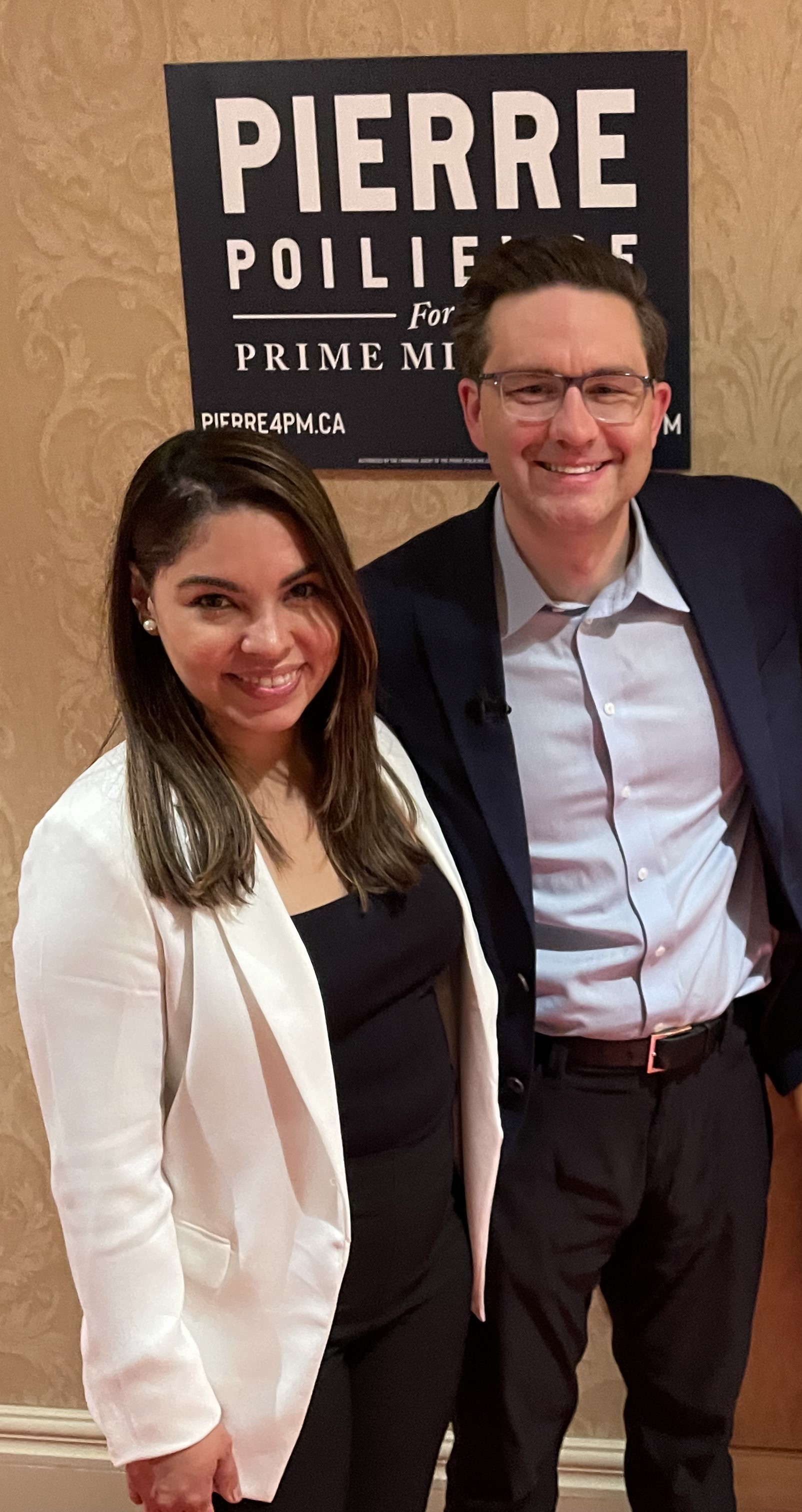
Poilievre and his wife Anaida at a campaign rally in April 2022

After moving to Ottawa, Poilievre dated Conservative political advisor and lobbyist Jenni Byrne until 2011.

In December 2017, Poilievre married Anaida Galindo, a Senate aide, in a ceremony in Portugal. Their first child, a daughter, was born in October 2018. In September 2021, the Poilievres welcomed their second child, a son.

Poilievre and his family reside in the Stornoway residence. Although this residence is normally reserved for the Leader of the Opposition, who must be a sitting MP, they were given permission to continue living there following the 2025 election by the interim opposition leader, Andrew Scheer, until Poilievre was re-elected.

According to his disclosure statement to the federal ethics commissioner, Poilievre co-owns a real estate investment company that owns a condo in the Calgary area, which he rents out to a tenant. His wife, Anaida Poilievre, also owns a rental property in the Ottawa suburb of Orleans, which she bought in 2012 and took out a mortgage on in 2020. Poilievre has defended his investments, saying that he and his wife are "helping solve the problem by providing affordable rental accommodations to two deserving families". While residing at Stornoway, Poilievre said that his wife used the equity in her property to "maximize the best interests of her financial position."

Poilievre is bilingual, speaking fluent English and French. Poilievre's Fransaskois father, Donald, taught him to preserve his French speaking competency from an early age.

== Electoral history ==
Parliament of Canada
Preceded by Damien Kurek	Member of Parliament for Battle River—Crowfoot; 2025–present	Incumbent
Preceded by David Pratt	Member of Parliament for Carleton (Nepean—Carleton, 2004—2015); 2004–2025	Succeeded by Bruce Fanjoy
Political offices
Preceded by Jason Kenney	Minister of Employment and Social Development; 2015	Succeeded by Jean-Yves Duclos; MaryAnn Mihychuk
Preceded by Tim Uppal	Minister for Democratic Reform; 2013–2015	Succeeded by Maryam Monsef
Preceded by Candice Bergen	Leader of the Opposition; 2022–2025	Succeeded by Andrew Scheer
Preceded by Andrew Scheer	Leader of the Opposition; 2025–present	Incumbent
Party political offices
Preceded by Candice Bergen; Interim	Leader of the Conservative Party; 2022–present	Incumbent
Order of precedence
Preceded by John Zerucelli as Secretary of state	Order of Precedence of Canada as Leader of the Official Opposition	Succeeded by Edith Dumont as Lieutenant Governor of Ontario
