= Crystal Galindo =

American visual artist (born 1983)

Crystal Galindo (born 1983) is an American visual artist, of Yaqui and Xicana descent. Her paintings are known for celebrating Chicanas and indigenous communities; and they give a strong sense of pride. She has been recognized for using bright colors, her imagery is body inclusive, and she specializes in portraits, as well as venturing into painting sacred icons like Selena. Galindo lives in the San Francisco Bay Area.

== Biography ==
Crystal Galindo was born in 1983 in Visalia, California, and raised in Exeter, Tulare County. She is of Yaqui, and Xicana descent. Galindo graduated from the College of the Sequoias in 2009; and she double majored in Painting and Chicano Studies at the Sonoma State University where she graduated in 2013 with a BFA degree.

Growing up, she developed a passion for art, she began making art with pens and colored pencils, but upon entering community college she learned to use charcoal, watercolor, and oil paints. The decision to pursue the arts came after watching her parents "give up their love for the arts" [sic] to provide for her and her siblings.

== Artwork ==
=== Plantitas (2021) ===
This series features portraits of women of color with floral elements to represent the energy of mother nature and how these women are goddesses too with their unique ethnic features.

=== Pink Teardrops: Diary of a Sadgirl (2018) ===
This series advocates for mental health, and touches upon how an individual can hide their sadness while dealing with depression and anxiety.

=== Dulceria (2016) ===
In “Dulceria”, Galindo addresses the issue of society making women feel guilty for indulging in things like sweets and even physical pleasure. Overall, Galindo wants her viewers to know they should not feel guilty for indulging in anything that makes them feel good despite any taboo in the Chicanx community and society.

=== Multifacetica (2013) ===
In the series “Multifacetica” Galindo paints women who represent power, strength, and pride in their cultural roots. Galindo features different shapes, symbols, and sacred symbols alongside the different women to inspire us to share our stories and break away from white supremacy by embracing our ethnic roots and how we are a physical representation of our ancestor's resilience.

== Exhibitions ==
- Dulce by Nature, Arts Visalia Visual Art Center, the exhibition was open from February 1–24, 2017
- Multifacetica: Un Cambio de Paradigma, COS Art Gallery, February 4–27, 2014
- Fotos y Recuerdos: Works by Crystal Galindo, Studio Grand, Oakland California, April 2015
