= Philemon Galindo =

British actor of Spanish descent

Philemon Galindo (1770 - 1840) was an Englishman of Spanish ancestry. He was born in London in 1770, the eldest son James Philemon and Mary (Boyle) Philemon. He acted in the Bristol and Bath Theatre Royal between 1778 and 1799 and married Frances DeLaRoche in 1789; they had two children. He relocated to Dublin in 1799 and married Catherine Gough, an Irish actress. They had three children, the first John, born 1802, adopted the name Juan Galindo. Philemon later relocated to London where he married Ann Jeacocke and had two more children.

In 1835 he was persuaded by his son Juan, then an agent of United Provinces of Central America, to serve as commandant of Bocas Town, Bocas Del Toro. At the time, this area was part of the New Kingdom of Granada. and in 1836 they removed him from office by force. He died in London on 10 February 1840.
