= Anaida Poilievre =

Canadian political staffer (born 1987)

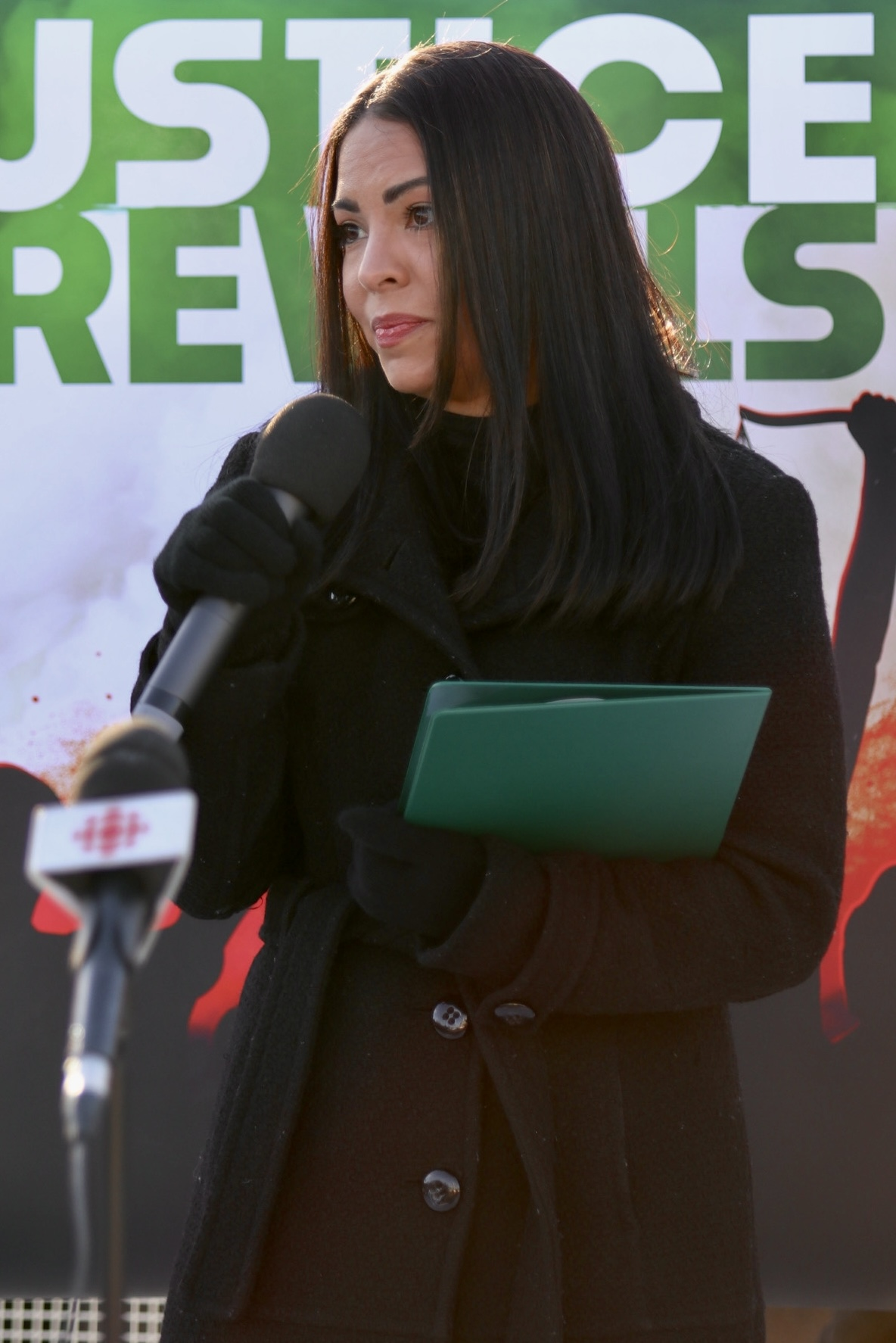
- Poilievre in 2023
- Born: Anaida Galindo; Caracas, Venezuela
- Citizenship: Venezuela; Canada
- Education: University of Ottawa
- Occupation: Political staffer
- Political party: Conservative
- Spouse: Pierre Poilievre (m. 2017)
- Children: 2

Anaida Poilievre (née Galindo) is a Canadian political staffer and the wife of Pierre Poilievre, leader of the Conservative Party of Canada. Born in Venezuela, she moved to Quebec with her family in 1995 at the age of eight. She began her career in politics as a parliamentary advisor in the Senate of Canada. Following her husband's election as leader of the Conservative Party in 2022, she became active in his campaign, delivering speeches and appearing in campaign videos. She is the co-founder of Pretty and Smart Co, an online lifestyle magazine.

== Early life and education ==
Anaida Galindo was born in Caracas, Venezuela. Her father was a bank manager. In 1995, when she was eight years old, her family moved as refugees to Pointe-aux-Trembles, a borough in east Montreal, Quebec. She studied communications at the University of Ottawa for one year.

== Career ==
After working in retail and customer service roles, Poilievre began her career in politics as a parliamentary affairs advisor at the Senate of Canada in 2008, before taking a job in the House of Commons. She worked for the Member of Parliament Michael Cooper as a parliamentary affairs advisor from 2015 to 2022.

Poilievre is a co-founder of the online lifestyle magazine Pretty and Smart Co. Early in the COVID-19 pandemic she supported restrictions, but later became critical of public health measures in Canada.

Following her husband's election as leader of the Conservative Party of Canada in 2022, Poilievre dedicated herself to his campaign, appearing in campaign videos and delivering speeches. She introduced him at the 2022 Conservative leadership convention with a multilingual speech in English, French, and Spanish.

In 2024, Poilievre launched "Their Stories Matter", a social media initiative to bring awareness to human trafficking. She stated that she became aware of the issue while working in the Senate in 2014, when the chamber was studying Bill C-36 on prostitution. She also launched another initiative, "Lead Her Forward" with Vanessa Mulroney the same year.

In August 2025, Poilievre announced that she is writing a book in Montreal titled Strong Pillars: Building an Unshakable Foundation.

== Personal life ==
Anaida Poilievre married Pierre Poilievre in 2017 in Sintra, Portugal. They have two children together.

She speaks her native language, Spanish, as well as French and English.

== Publications ==
- Poilievre, Anaida (1 August 2024). "How Venezuela's opposition outfoxed socialist dictator Nicolás Maduro". National Post. Toronto, ON: Postmedia Network.
- — (29 June 2025). "The Art of Not Caring: Social Media Hate? Not My Problem". Pretty & Smart Co.
