= Gabriela Medrano Galindo =

Mexican politician (born 1983)

- Born: 27 June 1983 (age 43); Cancún, Quintana Roo, Mexico
- Education: Universidad Anáhuac Cancún
- Occupation: Deputy
- Political party: PVEM

Gabriela Medrano Galindo (born 27 June 1983) is a Mexican politician affiliated with the PVEM. She served as federal deputy of the LXII Legislature of the Mexican Congress representing Quintana Roo, and previously served as a local deputy in the XIII Legislature of the Congress of Quintana Roo.
