= Cayo Galindo =

Peruvian politician

Member of Congress
- In office 26 July 2006 – 26 July 2011
- Constituency: Apurímac

Personal details
- Political party: Union for Peru
- Occupation: Politician

Cayo César Galindo Sandoval is a Peruvian politician. He was a Congressman representing Apurímac for the period 2006–2011, and belongs to the Union for Peru party.

== Biography ==
Cayo César Galindo Sandoval, lawyer from the Pontificia Universidad Católica del Perú, with more than 24 years of professional practice in the public and private sphere. Graduated from the Doctorate in Law and Political Science at the Universidad Nacional Mayor de San Marcos, as well as the Master's Degree in Political Science with a mention in Public Management at the Pontificia Universidad Católica del Perú, and the Master's Degree in Civil and Commercial Law at the University National Mayor of San Marcos; with a Postgraduate Degree in Development and National Defense at the Center for Higher National Studies - CAEN and in Governance and Political Management at the Pontificia Universidad Católica del Perú and The Graduate School of Political Management at George Washington University (GWU).

He has held the position of: Vice Minister of Labor of the Ministry of Labor and Employment Promotion, Chief of the Cabinet of Advisors of the Ministry of Justice and Human Rights, Chief of the Cabinet of Advisors of the Ministry of Labor and Employment Promotion. advisor to the Presidency of the Congress of the Republic, advisor to the Senior Officials Office of the Congress of the Republic. Advisor to the Ministerial Office of the Ministry of Production, Technical Secretary (e) of the National Labor Council, president of the Special Council for the Appointment of President of Arbitration Tribunals of Public Entities and State Companies and member of the Board of Directors of FONDOEMPLEO.

Elected Judge of the Constitutional Court in 2013, through Legislative Resolution of Congress 004-2012-2013-CR.

Congressman of the Republic from 2006 to 2011; being, during the aforementioned parliamentary period, a full member of the parliamentary commissions of Constitution and Regulation, of Justice and Human Rights, of the Special Commission for Review of the Penal Code, of the Special Commission of Rationalization of National Legislation and of the Sub-Commission of Constitutional accusations, among others.

He has taught at the School of Political Sciences - Faculty of Law of the Universidad Nacional Mayor de San Marcos, with the chair Theory of Political Power; as well as in Human Rights and Constitutional Law at the Army Intelligence School.
