= Ramón Galindo Noriega =

Mexican politician

- Born: 1 September 1955 (age 70); Ciudad Juárez, Chihuahua, Mexico
- Education: ITCJ; University of Surrey
- Occupations: Senator, Deputy and Mayor
- Political party: PAN

Ramón Galindo Noriega (born 1 September 1955) is a Mexican politician affiliated with the PAN. As of 2013 he served as Senator of the LX and LXI Legislatures of the Mexican Congress representing Chihuahua. He also served as Municipal president of Juárez between 1995 and 1998 and as Deputy of the LIX Legislature.

Preceded by Francisco Villarreal Torres	Municipal president of Juárez; 1995 — 1998	Succeeded by Enrique Flores Almeida
