= IES Beatriz Galindo =

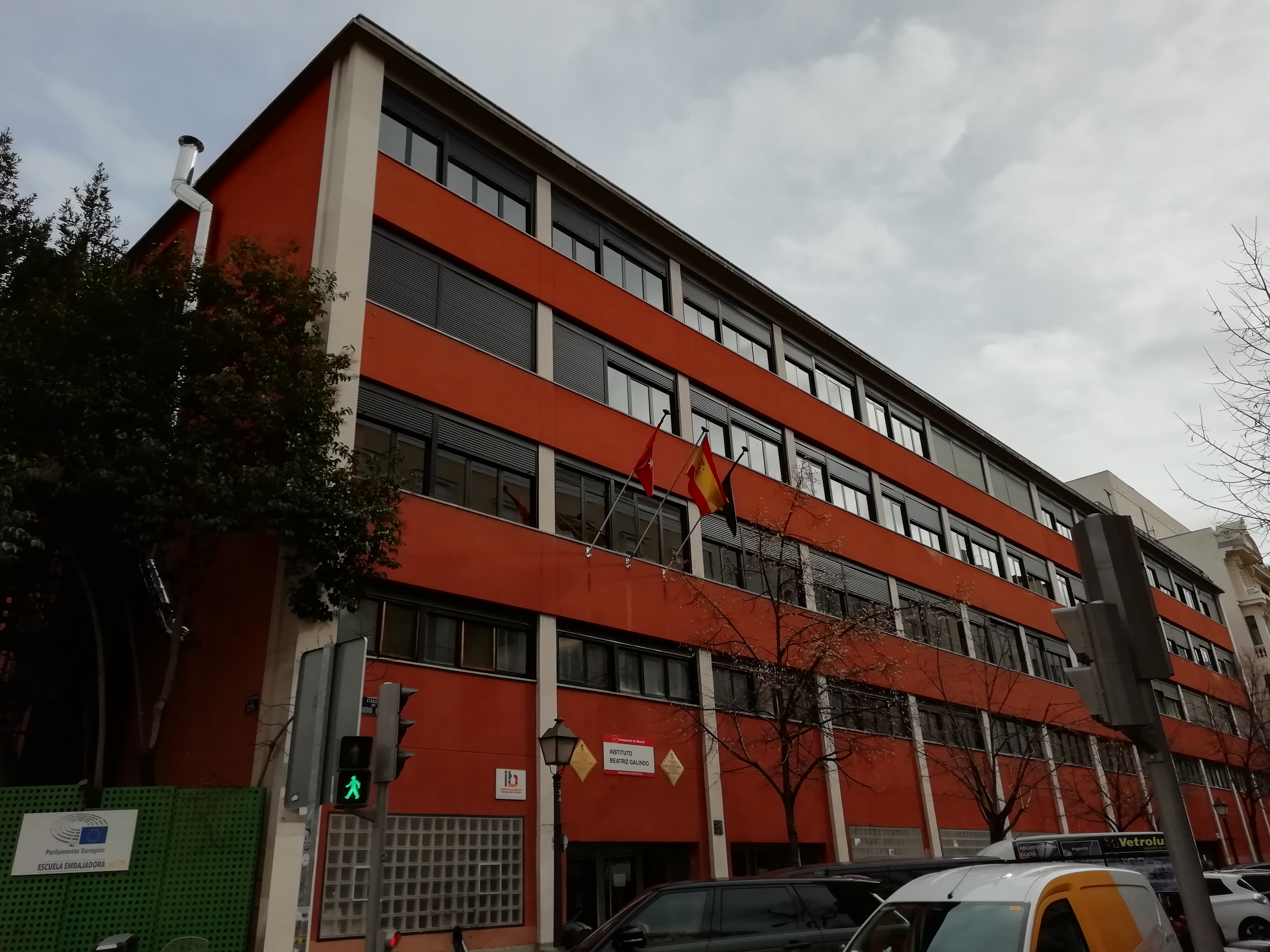

Location
- Calle de Goya, 10, Madrid, Spain; 40.425°N 3.686°W

Information
- Type: Public high school

The IES Beatriz Galindo is a public high school located in Madrid, Spain. It is located at Calle de Goya, on the corner with Calle de Claudio Coello. The estate previously hosted the Palace of Villapardierna. The building became the temporary seat of the Instituto de Enseñanza Media Beatriz Galindo in 1940, and it was formally expropriated in 1944 by the Ministry of National Education. In 1966, it was demolished and replaced by a new building more fitting for an educational centre. It is a multilingual institution, offering instruction in Spanish, English, and French. The seat of the Confucius Institute of Madrid is nestled within the premises.
