= Rodolfo Galindo =

Mexican footballer (born 1996)

Personal information
- Full name: Rodolfo Galindo Zendejas
- Date of birth: 7 January 1996 (age 30)
- Place of birth: Naucalpan, Mexico
- Height: 1.67 m (5 ft 6 in)
- Position: Midfielder

Senior career*
Years	Team	Apps	(Gls)
2015	Irapuato	2	(0)
2015–2018	Murciélagos	29	(1)
Total		31	(1)
- * Club domestic league appearances and goals

Rodolfo Galindo Zendejas (born January 7, 1996) is a Mexican former professional footballer who played as a midfielder.
