= Nursing shortage in Canada =

There has been a nursing shortage in Canada for decades. This became more acute in the period between 1943 and 1952 as Canada's health services were expanding, and the number of hospital beds increased along with the number of hospitalizations. By the mid-1940s across Canada the shortage, estimated at 8,700, led to a re-organization and re-conceptualization of nursing in Canada, according to a 2020 journal article in BC Studies. The nature of nursing was changing with new and time-consuming responsibilities, such as the administration of penicillin. During that period, there was no unemployment for nurses, especially if they were willing to be mobile. However, working conditions for nurses were very poor, with low wages combined with long hours; nursing force retention was challenging. As well, since almost all nurses were women, they had responsibilities at home they had to manage. In response to the shortage of nurses, women who had trained as registered nurses (RNs) but had left the workforce when they married, were encouraged to return to work; volunteers were engaged; nursing courses were accelerated; and new categories of regulated nursing were added to registered nursing—"practical nurses" and "nursing assistants." At that time, a "utopia of nursing" referred to teams of nursing staff which included registered nurses and other regulated nursing and hospital worker support personnel. Some of these auxiliary positions were also open to First Nations women and other racialized groups.

Since at least 1998, the Canadian Federation of Nurses Unions (CFNU) have been calling for solutions to the nursing shortage in Canada. In 2005, registered nurses worked an estimated 18 million hours of overtime—both paid and unpaid, representing the "equivalent of 10,054 full-time positions". The nursing force had among the highest rates of "burnout, injury and illness."

Along with a nursing shortage, there has also been a shortage of nursing educators, particularly nursing faculty in academia.

The COVID-19 pandemic in Canada spotlighted and exacerbated the existing nursing shortage. The shortage in the nursing workforce is one of the main factors behind unplanned forced closures of emergency rooms, lengthy offloading times for ambulances, critical care bed alerts. Intensive care units have been forced to refuse any additional patients, and hospitals have been working over capacity because of these staffing issues. During the seventh wave of the COVID-19 pandemic, the lack of nurses, along with the health system's backlog and a resurgence of hospitalized COVID-19 patients, has contributed to the health crisis.

Reports of those in the nursing profession who have the highest rates of "burnout, injury and illness" date back to at least 2008. There were 304,558 registered nurses who were licensed to practice in Canada as of 2020. Most had a single employer (84%) at the time of registration.. During the pandemic, health job vacancies had increased by 56.9% since 2019 in Canada to a "record high of 100,300. The highest vacancy rate was experienced by hospitals. Some of the factors leading to the exodus of the nursing labour force included "workload, burnout, lack of structural value, the need for leadership and mentorship, and lack of flexibility, autonomy and voice laced with overt racism, discrimination, and gendered inequities," according to a Royal Society of Canada-funded study. During the seventh wave of the COVID-19 pandemic, the lack of health care personnel, particularly nurses, along with the health system's backlog and a resurgence of hospitalized COVID-19 patients were some of the factors contributing to the overloading of emergency departments and lengthening of ambulance off-loading times.

A 2022 report by the Canadian Federation of Nurses Unions (CFNU) and the Canadian Health Workforce Network (CHWN) said that the "magnitude" of the crisis in nursing, which includes a 219.8% increase in nursing vacancies since 2017, has led to a paralysis of "[g]overnments and employers at all levels and across all sectors."

In early 2023, Statistics Canada reported that the number of vacancies for registered nurses had further had increased to 28,335, surpassing all other occupations in the Canadian labour market.

== Overview ==
The nursing shortage is global according to 2022 World Health Organization fact sheet. Of the estimated 27 million people comprising the global health workforce, which is currently experiencing a global shortage, about 50% are nurses and midwives. By 2006, the global nursing shortage was already described as an "unprecedented" as there was both a decreased supply of nurses along with an increasing demand for nursing staff. Concurrently, there was also a global "shortage of other health professions and auxiliary staff". Factors that contributed to a decrease in the supply side of the nursing workforce included "workloads, inadequate support staff, violence, stress, and burnout" that created an "unfavorable work environment", combined with problems with wages and management.

There has been a nursing shortage in Canada for decades. Across North America during the post-World War II years, there was a serious shortage of registered nurses. By the mid-1940s in Canada, the nursing shortage was approximately 8,700 and it was increasing along with health services in Canada and the number of hospital beds and hospitalizations. It was so severe that Vancouver General Hospital's newly built pavilion remained out-of-service because there were not enough registered nurses to staff it. The number of hospital beds across Canada increased from 1943 to 1952 by 26% and the number of admissions to hospitals increased by 74%. The nature of nursing was also changing with new and time-consuming responsibilities, such as the administration of penicillin. During that period, there was no unemployment for nurses, especially if they were willing to be mobile. However, working conditions for nurses were very poor, with low wages combined with long hours and nurse retention was challenging. As well, since almost all nurses were women, they had responsibilities at home they had to manage. By January 1943, 50% of Vancouver General Hospital's registered nurses were married women who had returned to work as nurses when encouraged by the hospital's administrators. In response to the shortage of nurses, volunteers were used and nursing courses were accelerated, and new categories of regulated nursing were added to registered nursing—"practical nurses" and "nursing assistants."

Because of the mid-twentieth century nursing shortage, nursing labour was reorganized and re-conceptualized. To expedite entry into nursing, debates were held across Canada about auxiliary nursing roles for assistants and practical nurses. At that time, a "utopia of nursing" referred to teams of nursing staff which included registered nurses and other regulated nursing and hospital worker support personnel. Some of these auxiliary positions were also open to First Nations women and other racialized groups.

Since at least 1998, the Canadian Federation of Nurses Unions (CFNU) have been calling for solutions to the nursing shortage in Canada,

According to a BMJ article, by 2000 Canada faced a "serious shortage" of RNs and the nursing shortage was predicted to worsen, not improve. By 2000, Canada was already experiencing an exit of nurses from the profession—20% of Canadian nurses who graduated in 1990 had left the profession by 1995, and about 10% had emigrated to the United States. In one interview, a third of the nurses said, with hindsight, they would not choose nursing as a career. The article, which cited the Canadian Nurses Association's (CNA) "comprehensive" national study, predicted a shortage by 2011 of between 59,000 and 113,000 across most of Canada. A 2002 CNA study reported that, without new policies and direction, the projected shortage of registered nurses in 2011 would be 78,000 RNs and up to 113,000 by 2016. The report also noted that there was a "shortage of nursing faculty".

In 2005, registered nurses worked an estimated 18 million hours of overtime—both paid and unpaid, representing the "equivalent of 10,054 full-time positions". The nursing force had among the highest rates of "burnout, injury and illness."

In 2018, Organisation for Economic Co-operation and Development (OECD) cautioned that Canada would have a shortage of 117,600 nurses by 2030.

In Alberta, by 2019 nursing staff included RNs, LPNs, and Health Care Aides (HCAs). Of these, 33% of RNs worked full-time, 42% worked part-time, and the remaining 25% were casual workers. are part-time and 25% are casual. The Ernst & Young report cited a participant in the AHS review process who said that, "Previously, nursing was a secondary family income in Alberta, but this isn't the case anymore. We [AHS] have the ability to rethink how we approach part-time nursing." In the same review, which was submitted just before the COVID-19 pandemic, Ernst & Young listed a number of nursing workforce changes as one of the major ways of cost cutting. The report said that AHS could save from CDN$231 million to $322 million by optimiz[ing] "nurse staffing based on patient demand." Other suggested changes included saving tens of millions in costs by reducing overtime and sick leave, shifting away from part time positions to increase full-time positions, removing provisions that require hiring of United Nurses of Alberta (UNA) members.

According to a 2022 joint report by the CFNU and the Canadian Health Workforce Network (CHWN), about 50% of nurses in Canada who were working in 2022, were considering leaving their job. Ninety four per cent of the nursing workforce had signs of burnout and 83% felt that understaffing issues negatively impacted on their quality of care. Since 2017, nursing vacancies increased by over 219.8% based on Statistics Canada's July 2022 Labour Force Survey. This nursing shortage has resulted in a paralysis at all levels of governments and health care worker employers. The report correlated the forced closure of health services to the nursing shortage and warned that increased privatization of health services is also a threat as it "diverts health human resources to the privileged at the expense of everyday Canadians".

== Measuring nursing shortage ==
the 2019 International journal of health planning and management article paper said that concepts, such as—professional standards, projections, or supply and demand economics— were not being sufficiently used to measure nursing shortages; instead, most often, the indicator was "essentially the number of nurses per 1000 inhabitants".

Other measurement indicators include the nurse to patient ratio, and supple and demand in the nursing industry.

Based on various models used by Employment and Social Development Canada (ESDC)'s Occupational Projection System (COPS) team, some provincial governments, Canadian Nurses Association (CNA), and Statistics Canada on vacancies, the 2019 International journal of health planning and management article said that there was a shortage of nurses in Canada. In 2012, it was 2.6% and the projection for nursing professional shortages across Canada in 2022, was between 50,000 and 60,000. The article said that nursing shortages can be measured based on professional standards, projections, or supply and demand economics.

In early 2021, Statistics Canada reported a 56% increase in vacancies for registered and psychiatric nurses in Canada, rising from 12,860 to 20,090. By early 2023, the number of vacancies for registered nurses had further increased to 28,335, surpassing all other occupations in the Canadian labour market. Licensed practical nurses ranked second in vacancy levels, while nurse aides experienced the third-highest increase in vacancies.

=== Nurse to patient ratio ===
Professional standards set the nurse to patient ratio. According to an Ernst & Young 2019 report, Canada uses the same set of targets for nurse to patient ratios that is used by leading organizations internationally. For medical and surgical units during the day shift, one nurse for four patients is the standard. This change during the night shift, with one nurse for five patients, and represents "5.33 hours per patient day". In obstetrical units the ratio for both day and night shifts in one nurse to five patients which represents 4.80 hours per patient. day)

According to the Canadian Federation of Nurses Unions (CFNU) in 2014 an average nurse to patient ratio for Canada was 1:4.

The 2019 commissioned Ernst & Young review of the province of Alberta's health care reported that the province ranked seventh on access to nurses.

One of the reasons given for Canadian nurses leaving Canada for the United States was unsafe patient ratios. In Ontario, one nurse said she was responsible for caring for six patients at a time.

In their report, Ernst & Young said that one way to measure the nursing staffing levels was to measure the number of "hours per patient day" per each patient on a given unit. They calculated this by dividing the total number of hours worked by RNs, LPNs, and unlicensed Health Care Aides (HCA), and "dividing it by the total number of patient days seen on the unit" which would translate into 6 out of 24 hours (per patient day) results in a 1:4 ratio.

=== Projection-based shortage ===
According to projection‐based shortage, a 2009 Canadian Nurses Association (CNA) report, the shortage of RNs in Canada would be approximately reach 60,000 full‐time equivalent (FTE) by 2022.

=== Supply and demand shortage ===
The economic concept of nursing shortages considers supply and demand—how many nurses are available and what is the actual demand. As of 2019, there were limited statistics on the nursing labour market, particularly as related to vacancies.

== Shortage of nurse educators ==
A 2014 study in Canada and another in 2019 confirmed that along with the shortage of nurses in Canada, there was also a national shortage in nursing educator in higher learning, which reflects the global shortage identified in 2011 by the Institute of Medicine and in 2020 by The World Health Organization (WHO).

A 1967 journal article in Canadian Nurse predicted a severe future shortage of nurses in Canada unless the shortage of nursing faculty in undergraduate and graduate programs was remedied. In the mid-1960s some of the factors that contributed to a lack of retention and growth in nursing faculty included the rate at which professors reaching retirement age being matched by new and younger hires. There were much higher salaries for these individuals in non-academic professions. The workload for nursing faculty was excessive.

== COVID-19 pandemic-related nursing shortages ==
While the COVID-19 pandemic "spotlighted" issues related to Canada's nationwide nursing shortage, it did not cause the shortage, according to the CFNU. Critical care, for example in ICUs, emergency services, long-term care (LTC), and all clinical settings have been affected by the nursing shortage.

Lakehead University's nursing school director, Kristen Jones-Bonofiglio, said that the COVID-19 pandemic exposed ways in which Canada's health care was unsustainable. She said that academic literature described how scarcity had become normalized in health care–an "ideology of scarcity".

Canadian Nurses Association president, Sylvain Brousseau, said that changes in the working environment, where nurses' values are no longer reflected, and where they no longer feel welcome, has led to an exodus of "burned-out, late-career nurses". Brousseau said this has contributed more to the pandemic-related increase in the nursing shortage than nurses unable to work because they contracted COVID.

A 2022 review of how the pandemic impacted the 400,000 nurses in Canada, sponsored by the Royal Society of Canada and published in the FACETS journal said that by 2021, health job vacancies had increased by 56.9% since 2019 in Canada to a "record high of 100,300. The highest vacancy rate was experienced by hospitals. The report found that for decades, the "nursing labour market" was "under stress" but "widespread systemic change" did not occur. The pandemic-related workload increase combined with chronic stress represented a "tipping point of systemic burnout". Some of factors leading to the exodus of the nursing labour force included "workload, burnout, lack of structural value, the need for leadership and mentorship, and lack of flexibility, autonomy and voice laced with overt racism, discrimination, and gendered inequities," according to Annette Elliott Rose, one of the study's authors.

Due to a shortage of nurses, in March 2022, during the COVID-19 pandemic in Canada, the first of many unplanned closures of emergency rooms took place—the first such occurrence since 2006. By September 2022, across Canada there were "dozens of forced closures of emergency rooms took place because of insufficient staff. By May, Ontario Health reported emergency department "record-high wait times and patient volumes." Hospital administrators said that one of the reasons for hospital staff shortages is the retirement since 2018 of many healthcare workers who are over the age of fifty who cited "the pandemic and burnout as top reasons." Other administrators said staffing issues were a concern before the pandemic. While some raised concerns that nurses who left their profession because of the vaccine mandate had contributed to the shortage, one hospital CEO said the number of those who left for that reason was so small, it was a "non-issue". A September 2022, New York Times article said that nurses in Canada left the profession because of "unsafe working conditions, wage dissatisfaction, and burnout from the pandemic". Sixteen emergency departments had to close in September because of nursing shortages in Canada's "most populous province", Ontario. Ontario Council of Hospital Unions president said in August that the work force which had been working through the pandemic in an unsafe work environment, and had their wages cut, was "exhausted" and "demoralized".

Due to shortages in staffing, Intensive Care Units (ICU) reached full capacity in August 2022, forcing the UHN to announce a 'critical care bed alert' at the Toronto General Hospital affecting the Cardiovascular (CVICU), Cardiac (CICU), and Medical Surgical Intensive Care Units (MSICU). On 28 October the UHN announced that the Toronto General Hospital was again under a 'critical care bed alert' with the three intensive care units—CVICU, Cardiac CICU, and MSICU—at total bed capacity. In 2019, one ICU bed in Alberta represented more than $1,000 a day just for nursing costs. per ICU bed day

In August 2022, with the province of Ontario facing the peak of the seventh wave of COVID-19, the University Health Network (UHN) in Toronto, which operates the largest hospital in the city—Toronto General–said that there were so understaffed that they were calling in nursing students. They put out a call for "volunteers" to fill nursing shifts. During the sixth wave they were forced to do this several times. In August, some patients waited 33 hours in ER to get an inpatient bed in Toronto.

Canadian Federation of Nurses Unions (CFNU) said on Twitter on 31 October 2022, that it had become normalized for hospitals to operate understaffed at overcapacity, with nurses regularly working 16 hour shifts—two nurses recently worked 30 hour shifts.

By mid-October 2022, prior to the beginning of the "traditional flu season", across Canada emergency departments were "under intense pressure". Concerns were raised as in Europe an eighth COVID-19 wave was beginning.

In the province of Quebec, there were staff shortages of all health care personnel—but mainly nursing personnel—negatively affected all of the province's health-care network." Largely because of the ongoing COVID-19 pandemic, emergency departments were operating at overcapacity, which in Montreal reached up to 200%. On 14 October, there were 4,000 health-care workers on leave because of COVID.

According to a June 2022 Statistics Canada's report on the results of the Survey on Health Care Workers' Experiences During the Pandemic (SHCWEP), 92% of nurses—compared to approximately 83% of other health care workers—said they felt more work-related stress. In response to the SHCWEP, 83.7% of nurses reported increased workload as nurses, related to acute care settings and the nature of hands-on care. As well there was an increase in demand for nurses during the pandemic. SHCWEP results also showed that The SHCWEP results show that 70.9% of nurses—compared to other 60.6% of health care workers, who were "not intending to retire" were thinking of "leaving their job or changing jobs".

University of Ottawa's Ivy Bourgeault, who is currently the Canada Research Chair in Comparative Health Labour Policy, said in a 13 December 2022 interview, that hospitals in Canada were in a "really vicious", "crisis situation", precipitated by a combination of the ongoing shortage of health care workers and the increase in cases of respiratory syncytial virus, the seasonal flu, and COVID-19 requiring hospitalization and emergency services. Pediatric ICUs have been overwhelmed in Ontario, Alberta, British Columbia, Manitoba, and in multiple other provinces. This has resulted in longer ER wait times and hospital closures.

By October 2022, with some rural hospitals in Ontario facing closures because of a shortage of nurses, the debate over the potential role of unvaccinated nurses became more spirited. At a tense town hall meeting, four hundred residents of Chesley raised concerns about the two-month-long forced closure of their local ER as the severity of nursing shortage had increased. An unvaccinated nurse who spoke up at the meeting saying she was ready to work pending permission, was met with calls for her rehiring. In response, the South Bruce Grey Health Centre (SBGHC) rural health network reviewed its COVID-19 vaccination policy and was publicly considering abandoning its vaccine policy, making it the first in Ontario to do so. On 10 December, the Ontario Hospital Association (OHA)—which has the jurisdiction over 140 hospitals in Ontario—sent an internal memo to SBGHC management restating the OHA's support for the existing provincial COVID-19 vaccination policies within hospitals, as "they offer the highest level of protection for patients and health care workers". Health care networks in British Columbia, Nova Scotia and Ontario continue to enforce vaccine mandates for health care workers, while in some places in Canada, unvaccinated health-care workers were already rehired in 2022, such as in Alberta, Manitoba, Newfoundland, New Brunswick, Saskatchewan, and in the Yukon, according to a CTV report.

=== Emergency departments overloaded ===
During the seventh wave of the COVID-19 pandemic, the lack of health care personnel, particularly nurses, along with the health system's backlog and a resurgence of hospitalized COVID-19 patients were some of the factors contributing to the overloading of emergency departments and lengthening of ambulance off-loading times. By 27 October there were 1,921 COVID-19 hospitalizations in Ontario and 121 more COVID-19 deaths. Prior to that, the last time the numbers were so high was on 9 February with 2,059 hospitalized with COVID-19.

=== Nurse shortages in rural communities ===
Critical nurse shortages were one of the major factors in the unplanned closures of emergency rooms in Ontario rural communities. This raised concerns among the future of rural health systems where emergency health care options are limited. A Canadian Association of Emergency Physicians representative said that an "unprecedented" number of nurses left for "less stressful and better paying jobs". Seventeen of the 160 departments that experienced these closures were rural.

== Nursing force retention and exit rates ==
By 2021, many in the nursing workforce considered taking a leave of absence or leaving the profession for good; others had already left. The factors causing the exit included work environments that were too demanding, understaffing that was chronic not acute, physical and moral injuries, burnout, and concerns for their mental health. In October 2022, following a meeting with collaborative action-oriented government coalition with Canadian Federation of Nurses Unions (CFNU), provincial nurse union leaders, Prime Minister Justin Trudeau, Minister of Health Jean-Yves Duclos, and Minister of Seniors Kamal Khera health care workers, and advocates the Health Canada Coalition was formed with a mandate to respond to the nursing workforce exit rate.

=== Nurses wages and benefits ===
Since 2018, the number of nurses leaving Ontario for the United States doubled as wages are higher there and the work environment less stressful—full-time permanent positions are paid $15-$20 more than similar jobs in Canada. They can also earn sign-on bonuses from $10,000 to $20,000, as well as housing and relocation assistance. The U.S.-based Commission on Graduates of Foreign Nursing Schools (CGFNS) said that in 2018, 801 Canadian nurses applied for credential transfers; in 2019 there were 1,300 applications; in 2019 there were 1,300; and by October 2022, the number had increased to 1,700.

Frank Mortimer of CGFNS said the number of Canadian nurses approved to work in the U.S. has doubled over the last five years and could be at an all-time high In 2019, during the pandemic, under the premiership of Doug Ford, Bill 124—Protecting a Sustainable Public Sector for Future Generations Act was enacted placing an annual cap of 1% for three years on most public sector employees, including nurses. This is lower than the inflation rate and according to opposition critics, represented a cut in salary. According to health care workers' unions, this contributed to the staff shortages. According to a 17 July 2022 Financial Accountability Office (FAO) report, in Ontario the government spent "$7.2 billion less than planned across all programs", including health. In 2019, the Ford administration capped the wages of most public sector employees, including nurses, causing staff shortages, according to health care workers' unions. In Ontario, since 2019 with the passage of Bill 124, there has been a "major increase" in nurses relocating to the US.

== Internationally educated nurses (IENs) ==
The CFNU and CHWN 2022 report called on the federal and provincial governments as well as employers to improve the integration of internationally educated nurses into the Canadian health workforce.

== See also ==
- Nursing shortage
