= Minister of Employment and Social Development =

The Minister of Employment and Social Development was a position in the Canadian government from 2013 to 2015. Its responsibilities are now split between:

- the Minister of Employment, Workforce Development and Disability Inclusion, and
- the Minister of Families, Children and Social Development
