= Juan Galindo =

Irish-born Central American military official

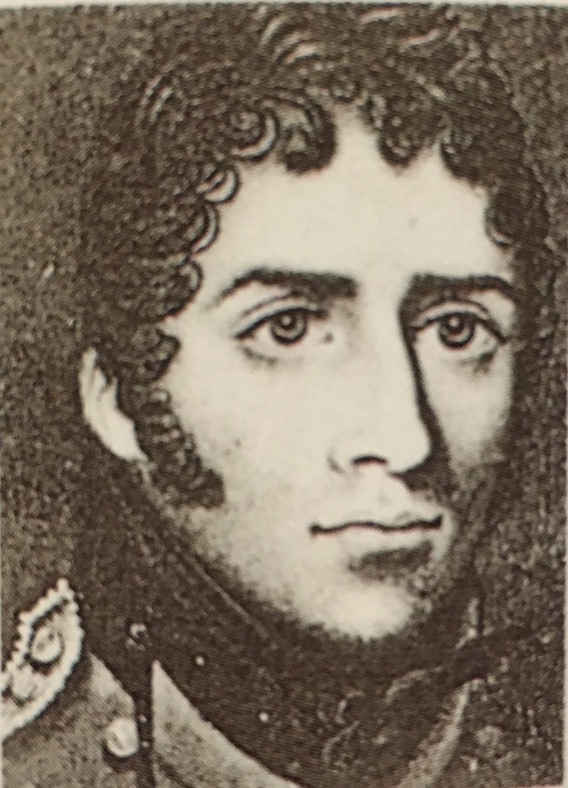
Juan Galindo

Juan Galindo (1802 – 30 January 1840) was an Irish-Honduran political activist and military and administrative officer for the Liberal government of the Federal Republic of Central America. He represented the government by a diplomatic mission to the United States and England. His duties in Central America allowed him to explore the region and examine Maya ruins. The reports on his findings earned him recognition as an early pioneer of Maya archaeology.

== Early years ==
Galindo was born in Dublin in 1802 as John Galindo. His father, Philemon Galindo was an Englishman of Spanish ancestry and his mother, Catherine Gough, was Irish. Both parents were actors who met while working at a theater in Bath in England. They married in Dublin in 1801. His early life is obscure and it is not known why or exactly when he left for the New World. Sources differ on his emigration but sometime before he was twenty years old he either joined Admiral Thomas Cochrane to fight for Chile's independence or he joined his uncle, a plantation owner in Jamaica.

The first definite record of his early career occurred in 1827 when he worked as secretary and translator for the British consul in Guatemala. By 1828 he was the superintendent for improvements for the port of Iztapa as well as a major in a Honduras battalion.

== Federal Republic of Central America ==
In 1829 the Liberal forces commanded by Francisco Morazán invaded Guatemala. Galindo joined the Liberals and Morazán's army quickly brought the revolution to a successful end. Morazán established the Federal Republic of Central America and Galindo enjoyed the patronage of Morazán and Mariano Gálvez, the chief of state in Guatemala. The new federal congress granted Galindo naturalization and he changed his name to Juan.

Galindo performed several military assignments for the new government, including officer of a military garrison at Omoa, commander of the port of Trujillo, and military governor of Petén. In 1834, he received a million-acre land grant in Petén with the stipulations that he pacify the native Lacandon Maya and settle the area in five years with colonists who would be loyal to the Guatemalan government. He soon realized that the boundary between Guatemala and British Honduras was in dispute and the British claimed that Galindo's new land grant belonged to British Honduras. British mahogany cutters were actively logging the area, depriving Galindo of the land's most valuable asset. When discussions with UK consul Frederick Chatfield in British Honduras failed to resolve the issue, Central America appointed Galindo as envoy to negotiate directly with the British Foreign Office in London.

Galindo left Central America in January, 1835, stopping first in Washington, DC in hopes of enlisting the United States to endorse his cause against the British. In return, Galindo offered to provide information regarding possible canal routes through Nicaragua. He met with Secretary of State John Forsyth and President Andrew Jackson in May, 1835 but failed to gain their endorsement. Galindo proceeded to London and arrived there in August. He had a meeting with Foreign Secretary Lord Palmerston soon after his arrival but then talks proceeded in a desultory fashion. By April 1836 Palmerston had determined not to work with Galindo and offered the expedient excuse that since Galindo was born a British subject, he could not represent a foreign government.

Without good title to his land grant in Petén, Galindo was unable to attract settlers. Instead, he petitioned Central America for another opportunity and was provided a grant on the Mosquito Coast. While still in London, Galindo recruited his father and other relatives to direct a group of colonists to settle on this remote coast. This enterprise ended in failure; the settlers were ill-equipped, lacked sufficient supplies, and found no way to earn a living once they arrived. By the time Galindo returned to Central America in 1836, the settlement had collapsed and his father had returned to England. He also found that his influence with the Central America government was greatly diminished.

The Liberal regime that had governed Central America was by now beleaguered. Galindo attempted to rally sympathy against perceived British aggression but this effort failed to gain popular attention. When civil war began, he rejoined the army, commanded by a Liberal general, Trinidad Cabañas. Cabañas was defeated by the joint forces of Honduras and Nicaragua near the city of Tegucigalpa. Galindo was killed on January 30, 1840, after the battle.

== Maya archaeology ==
As military governor of Petén, Galindo performed an exploratory journey down the Usumacinta River and then crossed overland to reach the Maya ruins at Palenque in April 1831. He spent a month exploring the site and wrote an account of the various structures, drew plans, and sketched several of the decorations he encountered. Later that year his account was published by the London Literary Gazette and the Geographical Society in Paris. He also sent a small collection of Maya objects to the Royal Society in London.

In 1834, Galindo was sent by the Central American government to survey and report on the ruins at Copán. He spent about ten weeks exploring the area, writing reports and sketching his findings. He wrote two brief reports for the London Literary Gazette and the American Antiquarian Society. A more detailed report with twenty-six illustrations was sent to the Société de Géographie in Paris and the original was sent to his government with the mistaken assumption that it would be published. Instead, it was filed away and "lost" for more than a hundred years when it was found and published in 1945.

Although it was just a small part of his career, Galindo proved to be an astute observer and an effective communicator who earned recognition as an early pioneer of Maya archaeology. He wrote some thirty-two letters to the Société de Géographie sharing his ideas. Galindo was one of the first to mention the close resemblance between the contemporary Maya peoples and the carved images of the ancient Maya to be found among the ruins, and suggested correctly that the original Maya civilization was created by the ancestors of the contemporary Mayas. He was also the first investigator to copy carefully the Mayan hieroglyphics and identify them as a unique form of writing.

== See also ==
- History of Central America
