= Canadian House of Commons Special Committee on Electoral Reform =

Special committee of the House of Commons of Canada

The House of Commons Special Committee on Electoral Reform (ERRE) (French: Comité spécial sur la réforme électorale) was a special committee of the House of Commons of Canada established in 2016 during the 42nd Canadian Parliament to investigate reforms to the Canadian electoral system. The formation of "an all-party Parliamentary committee to review... [electoral] reforms" was an election promise by Liberal Party leader Justin Trudeau in the 2015 federal election. After the Liberals won a majority in the election, and Trudeau became Prime Minister of Canada, he indicated the formation of a special committee was a priority in his mandate letter for Minister of Democratic Institutions Maryam Monsef. Shortly after the committee submitted its report to Parliament on December 1, 2016, Monsef was transferred to the position of the Minister of Status of Women and Karina Gould took over the electoral reform file. Shortly after taking her position, Gould announced that the government would no longer be pursuing reform of the electoral system, stating "It has become evident that the broad support needed among Canadians for a change of this magnitude does not exist."

== Establishment ==
On May 10, 2016, Maryam Monsef gave notice in the House of Commons of the government's plans for the composition of the Special Committee. The initial proposed structure of the Special Committee was three voting members allocated based on each official party's seats in the House (six Liberal members, three Conservative members, and one New Democratic member), with a member of the Bloc Québécois and Green Party leader Elizabeth May given additional non-voting seats.

The structure of the Special Committee was criticized by the opposition party leaders, as the government would have possessed a majority of the committee seats and could unilaterally recommend alterations to the electoral system without the support of any other party. Interim Conservative leader Rona Ambrose, the Leader of the Official Opposition, denounced the plan as "stacking the deck", while Nathan Cullen, the NDP critic for Democratic Institutions, urged the government to reconsider this plan as well. The Green Party and Bloc Québécois additionally objected to their lack of voting representation on the committee.

On June 2, 2016, Monsef announced that the government would support a motion by Cullen to alter the structure of the committee to have seats allocated based on percentage of the nationwide popular vote in the 2015 election and give the Bloc Québécois and Greens one voting seat each on the committee. The Liberal caucus on the committee would have in effect only four voting members, as the chair would not vote unless there was a tie.

On June 7, 2016, Cullen's motion, seconded by NDP MP Matthew Dubé, was approved by the House of Commons. The special committee was thereby empowered to "conduct a study of viable alternate voting systems to replace the first-past-the-post system, as well as to examine mandatory voting and online voting", all with an eye to improving the legitimacy, integrity, and inclusiveness of the voting system and the extent to which it could facilitate local representation and citizen engagement.

The motion directed that parties' whips assign members to the committee within ten sitting days of its passage, and that the committee issue its final report to the House of Commons no later than December 1, 2016. This deadline was extended to June 23, but this proved to be unnecessary, as the final membership was deposited with the Clerk of the House on June 17. The committee held its first meeting on June 21, 2016.

== Citizen submissions ==
The deadline for making submissions to the committee was October 7, 2016. Citizens were able to make submissions online, attend town hall meetings hosted by Members of Parliament or attend committee hearings which were held in cities across Canada in September and early October 2016.

By October 8, 2016, a poll by Mainstreet Research for the Ottawa Citizen revealed that, while 45 per cent of Ottawa voters are following the electoral reform process and that two in three Ottawa residents favour reforms, most of those surveyed missed out on local town hall meetings on electoral reform already held by MPs because they were not aware that they were happening.

== Membership ==
Party	Member	District
Bloc Québécois	Luc Thériault	Montcalm, QC
Conservative	Scott Reid, vice-chair	Lanark—Frontenac—Kingston, ON
Conservative	Gérard Deltell	Louis-Saint-Laurent, QC
Conservative	Blake Richards (Note: Richards was appointed to the committee on August 12, 2016 to replace fellow Alberta-based Conservative MP Jason Kenney, who was elected in 2015 for the riding of Calgary Midnapore. Kenney resigned as an MP to seek the leadership of the Progressive Conservative Association of Alberta.)	Banff—Airdrie, AB
Green	Elizabeth May	Saanich—Gulf Islands, BC
Liberal	Francis Scarpaleggia, chair	Lac-Saint-Louis, QC
Liberal	John Aldag	Cloverdale—Langley City, BC
Liberal	Matt DeCourcey	Fredericton, NB
Liberal	Sherry Romanado	Longueuil—Charles-LeMoyne, QC
Liberal	Ruby Sahota	Brampton North, ON
New Democratic	Nathan Cullen, vice-chair	Skeena—Bulkley Valley, BC
New Democratic	Alexandre Boulerice	Rosemont—La Petite-Patrie, QC

== Witnesses ==
The committee heard from numerous public servants, academics, members of the public, and electoral officers from Canada and around the world. The first witness before the committee was Maryam Monsef, Minister of Democratic Institutions, who outlined the government's approach. The following day, Chief Electoral Officer Marc Mayrand and his predecessor Jean-Pierre Kingsley testified. Their counterparts Robert Peden, from the New Zealand Electoral Commission, and Tom Rogers, of the Australian Electoral Commission, also appeared later in July. Among the many academics that testified before the committee was Arend Lijphart, an expert on electoral systems. In September and October 2016, the committee held public meetings in cities across Canada. Computer security expert Barbara Simons presented to the committee in Vancouver.

== Report ==
The committee adopted its final report, Strengthening Democracy in Canada: Principles, Process and Public Engagement for Electoral Reform, on November 28, 2016. The report was presented to the House of Commons on December 1, 2016. The twelfth recommendation of thirteen was that a referendum should be held, with both the current voting system and a proposed proportional electoral system on the ballot. The government would design the system with the goal of any proposed system scoring a 5 or less on the Gallagher index but preserve local representation by avoiding party-list proportional representation systems, and the committee recommended that the design of the proposed system be finalized and shared with Canadians before any referendum campaign is conducted.

The report also included recommendations against implementing online voting and mandatory voting and recommended exploring the use of other technologies in the voting process to improve accessibility, especially for persons with disabilities and segments of the population which have historically been disenfranchised. The report considers the option Instant-runoff voting (Alternative Vote in Single-Member Constituencies), but does not recommend it.

== Aftermath and outcomes ==
On February 1, 2017, the newly appointed Minister of Democratic Institutions Karina Gould announced that the government was no longer pursuing electoral reform and it was not listed as a priority in her mandate letter from Justin Trudeau. In the letter, Trudeau wrote that "a clear preference for a new electoral system, let alone a consensus, has not emerged" and that "without a clear preference or a clear question, a referendum would not be in Canada's interest."

Both Nathan Cullen and Elizabeth May addressed Gould's announcement during the next Question Period. Cullen said that Trudeau and the Liberals "will certainly pay a political price" in the next election for not following through on their electoral reform promise, while May stated her disappointment with Trudeau and her frustration that "our feminist prime minister threw two young women cabinet ministers [Gould and Monsef] under the bus on a key election promise." Defending the decision, Trudeau claimed in later statements that implementing a proportional system would "augment extremist voices and activist voices" and promote instability in the country.

Gould tabled the government's official response to the committee report in the House of Commons on April 3, 2017. In response to Recommendations 1, 2, 11, 12, and 13 (related to changing the electoral system) she reiterated that "changing the electoral system is not in [her] mandate as Minister of Democratic Institutions" and that the government "remains committed to improving, strengthening and safeguarding Canada's democratic institutions." Gould indicated that the government accepted the remaining recommendations, including the recommendations against implementing online and mandatory voting.

Press reaction reflected the view that abandoning basic system reform had broken a promise.

On May 31, 2017, a non-whipped vote to adopt the Dec 1, 2016 report of the Canadian House of Commons Special Committee on Electoral Reform was held but was defeated by 159 votes to 146. Thus the federal reform effort was abandoned. Only two Liberal MPs voted in favour: Nathaniel Erskine-Smith of Beaches—East York in Ontario and Sean Casey of Charlottetown in Prince Edward Island (PEI) voted in favor. Casey explicitly cited the 2016 PEI referendum as a factor in his vote:

"...more than 9,000 of the people that I represent cast their ballots in the provincial plebiscite and about two-thirds of them indicated that they wanted to move away from the First-Past-the-Post (FPTP) system at a provincial level. That, to me, was a very, very clear indication of the will of my constituents and that's what I was sent here to do, to project their voice. So that's what I did."

In 2018, Trudeau had continued to express reservations about proportional representation has but expressed openness to considering other systems. Gould said, "The first-past-the-post system may not be perfect — no electoral system is, but it has served this country for 150 years and advances a number of democratic values that Canadians hold dear, such as strong local representation, stability and accountability."

On January 6, 2025, Trudeau expressed regret at not introducing electoral reform during his resignation speech. In an interview with Nathaniel Erskine-Smith, Trudeau elaborated that he did not support proportional representation and his regret was around not having instant runoff passed through instead.
