= Politics of Canada =

- Centre Block on Parliament Hill
- Polity type: Federal parliamentary constitutional monarchy
- Constitution: Constitution of Canada

Legislative branch
- Name: Parliament
- Type: Bicameral
- Meeting place: Parliament Buildings
- Upper house
- Name: Senate
- Presiding officer: Raymonde Gagné, Speaker
- Appointer: Governor General
- Lower house
- Name: House of Commons
- Presiding officer: Francis Scarpaleggia, Speaker

Executive branch
- Head of state
- Currently: King Charles III represented by Louise Arbour, Governor General
- Head of government
- Currently: Prime Minister; Mark Carney
- Appointer: Governor General
- Cabinet
- Name: Cabinet of Canada
- Current cabinet: 30th Canadian Ministry
- Leader: Prime Minister
- Deputy leader: Deputy Prime Minister
- Appointer: Governor General
- Ministries: 30

Judicial branch
- Name: Court system of Canada
- Supreme Court
- Chief judge: Richard Wagner

The politics of Canada functions within a framework of parliamentary democracy and a federal system with strong democratic traditions. Canada is a constitutional monarchy where the monarch is the ceremonial head of state. In practice, executive authority is entrusted to the Cabinet, a committee of ministers of the Crown chaired by the prime minister of Canada that act as the executive committee of the King's Privy Council for Canada and are responsible to the democratically elected House of Commons.

Canada is described as a "full democracy", with a tradition of liberalism, and an egalitarian, moderate political ideology. Extremism has never been prominent in Canadian politics, with the population generally identifying as ideologically centrist or moderate. Peace, order, and good government, alongside an Implied Bill of Rights, are founding principles of the Canadian government. Since the 1960s an emphasis on multiculturalism and social justice has been a distinguishing element of Canada's political culture, with efforts towards diversity, equity and inclusion for all its people.

The country has a multi-party system, with two dominant political parties: the Liberal Party and Conservative Party (as well as its numerous predecessors), that practice "brokerage politics". (Note: "Brokerage politics—A Canadian term for successful big tent parties that embody a pluralistic catch-all approach to appeal to the median Canadian voter ... adopting centrist policies and electoral coalitions to satisfy the short-term preferences of a majority of electors who are not located on the ideological fringe.") Other notable parties include the New Democratic Party, Bloc Québécois and the Green Party, who have exerted their own influence to the political process.

While many of its legislative practices derive from the unwritten conventions of and precedents set by the Westminster parliament of the United Kingdom, Canada has evolved variations: party discipline is stronger than in the United States or United Kingdom, and more parliamentary votes are considered motions of confidence, which tends to diminish the role of non-Cabinet members of parliament (MPs). Such members, in the government caucus, and junior or lower-profile members of opposition caucuses, are known as backbenchers. Backbenchers can, however, exert their influence by sitting in parliamentary committees, like the Public Accounts Committee or the National Defence Committee.

== Context ==
Canada's governmental structure was originally established by the British Parliament through the British North America Act, 1867 (now the Constitution Act, 1867), but the federal model and division of powers were devised by Canadian politicians. Particularly after World War I, citizens of the self-governing Dominions, such as Canada, began to develop a strong sense of identity, and, in the Balfour Declaration of 1926, the British government and the governments of the six Dominions jointly agreed that the Dominions had full autonomy within the British Commonwealth.

In 1931, after further consultations and agreements between the British government and the governments of the Dominions, the British Parliament passed the Statute of Westminster, giving legal recognition to the autonomy of Canada and other Dominions. However, Canadian politicians were unable to obtain consensus on a process for amending the constitution, which was therefore not affected by the Statute of Westminster, meaning amendments to Canada's constitution continued to require the approval of the British parliament until that date. Similarly, the Judicial Committee of the Privy Council in Britain continued to make the final decision on criminal appeals until 1933 and on civil appeals until 1949. It was not until 1982, with the Patriation of the Constitution, that the role of the British Parliament was ended.

== Political culture ==
Canada's egalitarian approach to governance has emphasized social welfare, economic freedom, and multiculturalism, which is based on selective economic migrants, social integration, and suppression of far-right politics, that has wide public and political support. Its broad range of constituent nationalities and policies that promote a "just society" are constitutionally protected. Individual rights, equality and inclusiveness (social equality) have risen to the forefront of political and legal importance for most Canadians, as demonstrated through support for the Canadian Charter of Rights and Freedoms, a relatively free economy, and social liberal attitudes toward women's rights (like abortion), divorce, homosexuality, same-sex marriage, birth control, euthanasia or cannabis use. There is also a sense of collective responsibility in Canadian political culture, as is demonstrated in general support for universal health care, multiculturalism, evolution, gun control, foreign aid, and other social programs. The main political issues in Canada were cost of living, Canada–United States relations, affordable housing, health care and immigration according to a 2026 Abacus Data poll.

External videos
- "Is the Left/Right political spectrum outdated?" – Global News, 2019 (7:23 mins).

At the federal level, Canada has been dominated by two relatively centrist parties practising "brokerage politics", the centre-left leaning Liberal Party of Canada and the centre-right leaning Conservative Party of Canada (or its predecessors). "The traditional brokerage model of Canadian politics leaves little room for ideology" as the Canadian catch-all party system requires support from a broad spectrum of voters. The historically predominant Liberals position themselves at the centre of the political scale, with the Conservatives sitting on the right and the New Democratic Party occupying the left. Five parties had representatives elected to the federal parliament in the 2025 election: the Liberal Party who currently form the government, the Conservative Party who are the Official Opposition, the New Democratic Party, the Bloc Québécois, and the Green Party of Canada.

Polls have suggested that Canadians generally do not have a solid understanding of civics. This has been theorized to be a result of less attention being given to the subject in provincial education curricula, beginning in the 1960s. By 2008, a poll showed only 24 per cent of respondents could name the monarch as head of state. Likewise, Senator Lowell Murray wrote five years earlier that "the Crown has become irrelevant to most Canadians' understanding of our system of Government." As John Robson of the National Post opined in 2015: "Intellectually, voters and commentators succumb to the mistaken notion that we elect 'governments' of prime ministers and cabinets with untrammelled authority, that indeed ideal 'democracy' consists precisely in this kind of plebiscitary autocracy." Instead under our election system, seats are allocated based on separate district contests; the prime minister is named by a party that holds majority of seats in the House of Commons or survives in that position by being supported by a working majority of multiple parties in the House of Commons; and governments remain in power only as long as they have support of a majority in the House, whether that group was elected by a majority of voters or not.

== Governmental organization ==
=== Type of government ===
Westminster style federal parliamentary democracy within a constitutional monarchy.

=== Administrative divisions ===
Ten provinces: Alberta, British Columbia, Manitoba, New Brunswick, Newfoundland and Labrador, Nova Scotia, Ontario, Prince Edward Island, Quebec, Saskatchewan.

three territories: Northwest Territories, Nunavut, Yukon.

=== Constitution ===
Westminster system, based on unwritten conventions and written legislation.

=== Legal system ===
Federal government is bijural, enacting laws that are based on both the common law and the civil law; accepts compulsory International Court of Justice jurisdiction, with reservations.

Common law is used in all provinces and territories except Quebec, which is a civil law jurisdiction, using the Civil Code of Quebec.

=== Suffrage ===
Citizens aged 18 years or older. Only two adult citizens in Canada cannot vote: the Chief Electoral Officer, and the Deputy Chief Electoral Officer. The Governor General is eligible to vote, but abstains due to constitutional convention.

=== Monarchy ===
==== Head of state ====
Charles III, King of Canada (since 8 September 2022).

==== Governor General ====
Louise Arbour, Governor General of Canada (since June 8, 2026).

Charles III, King of Canada, the country's head of state

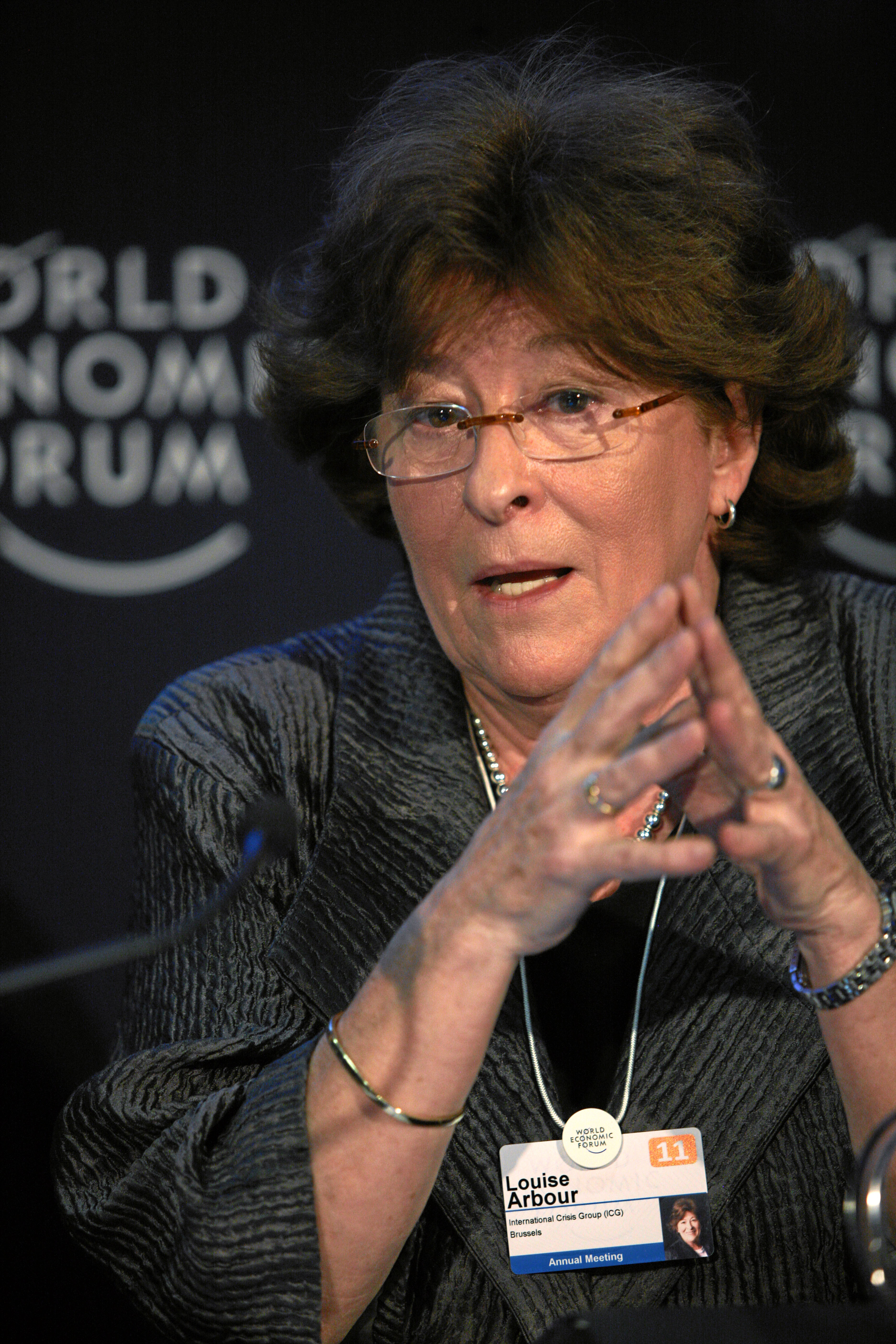
Louise Arbour, Governor General of Canada, the monarch's representative

The function of constitutional monarchy is to personify the democratic state, to sanction legitimate authority, to assure the legality of means, and guarantee the execution of the public will.

— Elizabeth II, Queen of Canada, Quebec City, 1964

Canada is a constitutional monarchy, wherein the role of the reigning sovereign is both legal and practical, but not political. The monarch is formally vested with all powers of state, which are in practice exercised only by the various institutions of government acting under the sovereign's authority. The executive is thus formally referred to as the King-in-Council, the legislature as the King-in-Parliament, and the courts as the King-on-the-Bench.

Though the person who is monarch of Canada (currently Charles III) is also the monarch of 14 other countries in the Commonwealth of Nations, he nevertheless reigns separately as King of Canada, an office that is "truly Canadian" and "totally independent from that of the monarch of the United Kingdom or the other Commonwealth realms." On the advice of the Canadian prime minister, the sovereign appoints a federal viceregal representative—the governor general (currently Louise Arbour)—who, since 1947, is permitted to exercise almost all of the monarch's royal prerogative; though, there are some duties which must be specifically performed by the monarch themselves (such as assent of certain bills). In case of the governor general's absence or incapacitation, the administrator of Canada performs the Crown's most basic functions.

Royal assent is required to enact laws. As part of the royal prerogative, the royal sign-manual gives authority to letters patent and orders-in-Council. The royal prerogative also includes summoning, proroguing, and dissolving Parliament in order to call an election and extends to foreign affairs, which include the negotiation and ratification of treaties, alliances, international agreements, and declarations of war; the accreditation of Canadian diplomats and receipt of foreign diplomats; and the issuance of passports.

Despite the wide theoretical extent of the sovereign's powers, in actual practice the sovereign exercises them only through or with the advice of the Prime Minister and Cabinet. Within the constitutional conventions of the Westminster system, the sovereign's freedom of action or personal choice in any area of governance is quite limited.

=== Executive power ===
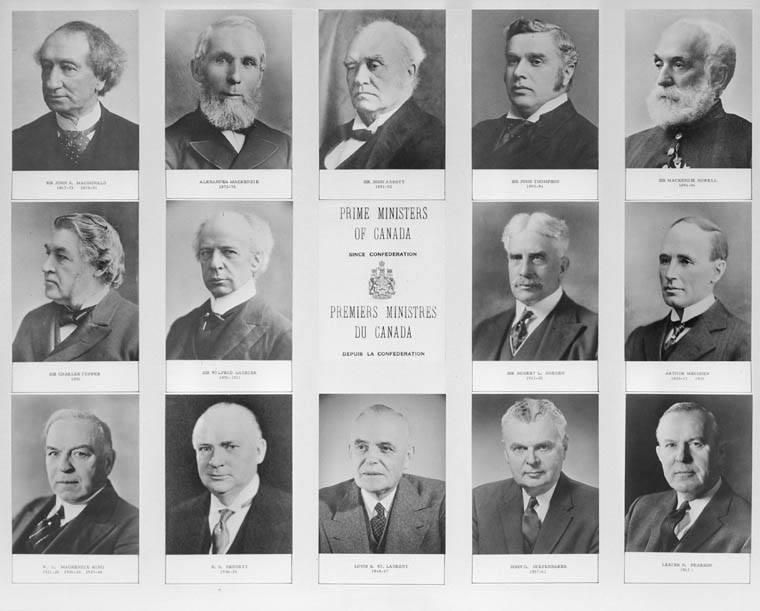
Canada's Prime Ministers from 1867 to 1963. The Prime Minister of Canada serves as the head of government.

==== Head of government ====
Mark Carney, Prime Minister of Canada (since March 14, 2025).

==== Cabinet ====
Ministers (usually around thirty) chosen by the prime minister and appointed by the governor general to lead various ministries and agencies, generally with regional representation. Traditionally most, if not all, cabinet ministers will be members of the leader's own party in the House of Commons or Senate (see Cabinet of Canada); however this is not legally or constitutionally mandated, and occasionally, the prime minister will appoint a cabinet minister from another party.

==== Elections ====
The monarchy is hereditary. The governor general is appointed by the monarch on the advice of the Prime Minister for a non-specific term, though it is traditionally approximately five years. Following legislative elections, the leader of the majority party in the House of Commons is usually designated by the governor general to become prime minister.

=== Legislative power ===
The bicameral Parliament of Canada consists of three parts: the monarch, the Senate, and the House of Commons.

The Senate, which is frequently described as providing regional representation, has 105 members appointed by the Governor-General on the advice of the Prime Minister to serve until age 75. It was created with equal representation from the three regions of Ontario, Quebec, and the Maritimes (originally New Brunswick and Nova Scotia, expanded in 1873 to include Prince Edward Island). In 1915, a new Western division was created, with six senators from each of the four western provinces, so that each of the four regions had 24 seats in the Senate. When Newfoundland and Labrador joined Confederation in 1949, it was not included in an existing region and was assigned six seats. Each of the three territories has one seat. It is not based on representation-by-population. The normal number of senators can be exceeded by the Governor General at the direction of the monarch on the advice of the Prime Minister, as long as the additional senators are distributed equally with regard to region (up to a total of eight additional senators). This power of additional appointment has only been used once, when Prime Minister Brian Mulroney petitioned Queen Elizabeth II to direct that eight seats be added to the Senate so as to ensure the passage of the Goods and Services Tax legislation.

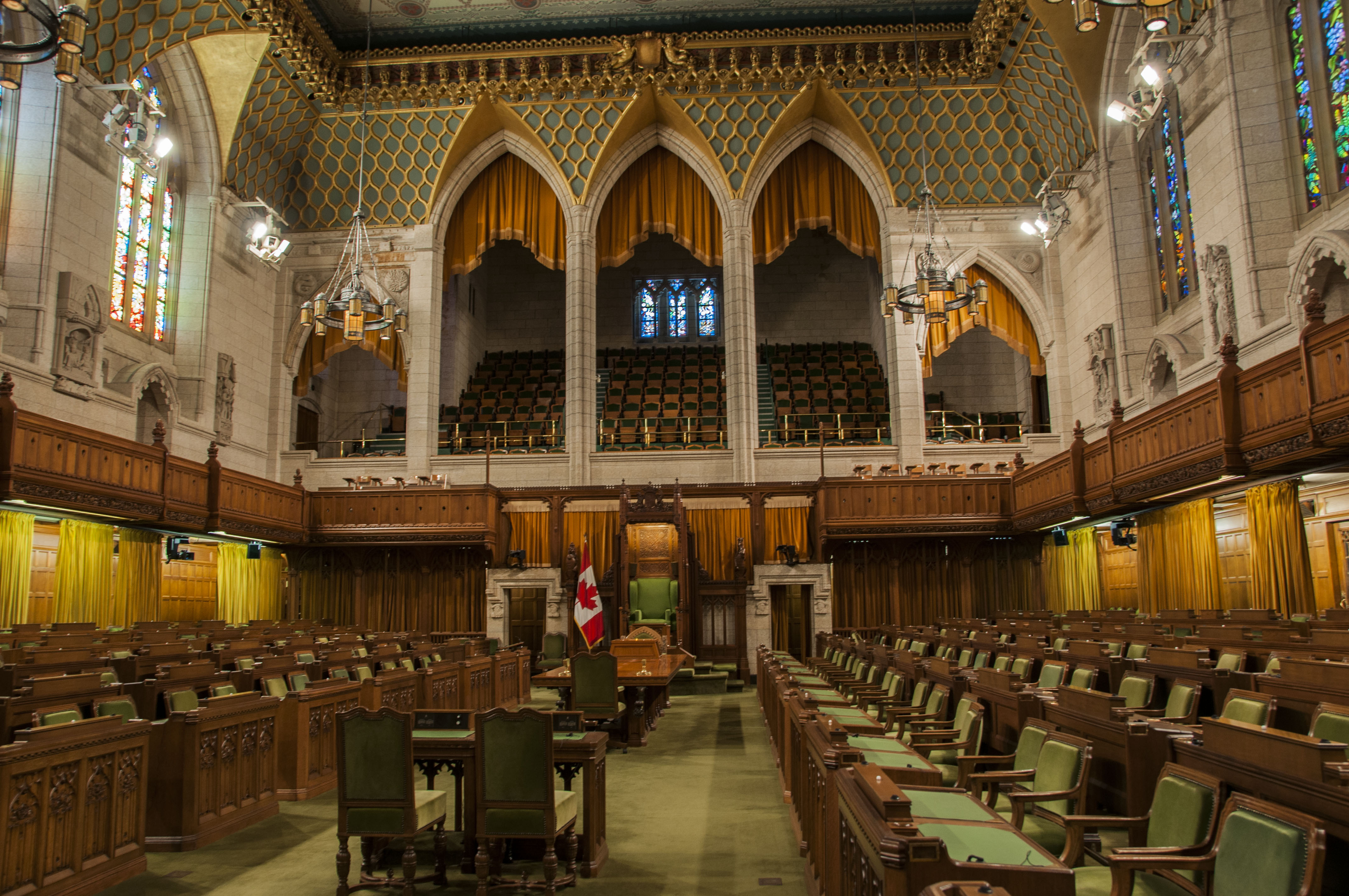
A democratically elected body, the House of Commons of Canada is one of three components of the Parliament of Canada.

The House of Commons currently has 343 members elected in single-member districts in a plurality voting system (first past the post), meaning that members must attain only a plurality (the most votes of any candidate) rather than a majority. The electoral districts are also known as ridings.

Mandates cannot exceed five years; an election must occur by the end of this time. This fixed mandate has been exceeded only once, when Prime Minister Robert Borden perceived the need to do so during World War I. A constitutional amendment was passed, extending the life of the Parliament by one year, by the unanimous consent of the House of Commons. The size of the House and apportionment of seats to each province is revised after every decennial census, conducted every ten years, and is based on population changes and approximately on representation-by-population.

=== Elections and government formation ===
Canadians vote for the election of their local member of parliament (MP) only. A vote is cast directly for a candidate. Most candidates affiliate themselves to a political party, but candidates can run as independents. The candidate in each riding who receives a plurality of votes (single member plurality or so-called first-past-the-post system) is elected, whether or not they receive a majority of district votes. An MP need not be a member of any political party. MPs may sit as independents.

The Canada Elections Act defines a political party as "an organization one of whose fundamental purposes is to participate in public affairs by endorsing one or more of its members as candidates and supporting their election." Forming and registering a federal political party are two different things. There is no legislation regulating the formation of federal political parties. Elections Canada cannot dictate how a federal political party should be formed or how its legal, internal and financial structures should operate.

Most parties elect their leaders in instant-runoff elections to ensure that the winner receives more than 50% of the votes. This happens at leadership conventions. Normally the party leader stands as a candidate to be an MP during an election. Canada's parliamentary system empowers political parties and their party leaders. Where one party gets a majority of the seats in the House of Commons, that party is said to have a "majority government" and by itself has right to form the cabinet and pass laws. Through party discipline, the party leader, who if elected sits in only one riding, exercises control over the cabinet and the parliament.

Historically, the prime minister and senators are selected by the governor general as a representative of the King, though in modern practice the monarch's duties are ceremonial. Consequently, the prime minister, while technically selected by the Governor General, is for all practical purposes selected by the party with the majority of seats (or the party that can get support from a majority of MPs). That is, the party that gets the most seats normally forms the government, with that party's leader becoming prime minister. The prime minister is not directly elected by the general population, although the prime minister is almost always elected as an MP within a single riding.

Often elections give one party a majority of the seats in the House of Commons, even if the party did not receive a majority of the vote. However, as there are usually three or more political parties represented in the House of Commons, often no party takes a majority of the seats. A minority government occurs when no party in the House of Commons holds more seats than the opposition parties combined. However, for the new government to survive and to pass laws, the leader chosen must have the support of the majority of the House, meaning they need the support of the elected members of at least one other party. This can be done on a case-by-case basis, through a coalition government (which has only occurred once at the federal level, the Unionist government formed during the First World War) or through a confidence-and-supply agreement (such as the one the Liberals and the NDP signed in 2022).

If a party in power does not get support of a majority of MPs in a vote in the House of Commons, the defeated ministry may choose to stay in office until defeated on a vote of confidence in the House, or it may resign. If it resigns, the governor general may call an election immediately or may ask the leader of an opposition party to form a government. And again that new governing party has to aggregate support of a majority of MPs in the House of Commons, if it is to hold its position as governing party.

== Federal-provincial relations ==
A map of Canada's provinces and territories

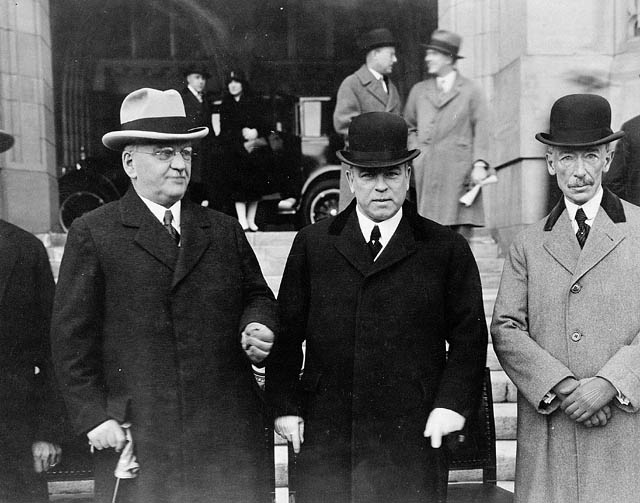
William Lyon Mackenzie King (centre), Prime minister of Canada, between Howard Ferguson (left), Premier of Ontario, and Louis-Alexandre Taschereau (right), Premier of Quebec, at the Dominion-Provincial Conference, 1927.

As a federation, the existence and powers of the federal government and the ten provinces are guaranteed by the Constitution. The Constitution Act, 1867 sets out the basic constitutional structure of the federal government and the provinces. The powers of the federal Parliament and the provinces can only be changed by constitutional amendments passed by the federal and provincial governments. The Sovereign is the formal head of state of the federal government and each of the ten provinces, but has no political role. The governments are led by the representatives of the people: elected by all adult Canadians at the federal level, and by the citizens of each province at the provincial level.

Federal-provincial (or intergovernmental, formerly Dominion-provincial) relations is a regular issue in Canadian politics: Quebec wishes to preserve and strengthen its distinctive nature, western provinces desire more control over their abundant natural resources, especially energy reserves; industrialized Central Canada is concerned with its manufacturing base, and the Atlantic provinces strive to escape from being less affluent than the rest of the country.

In order to ensure that social programs such as health care and education are funded consistently throughout Canada, the "have-not" (poorer) provinces receive a proportionately greater share of federal "transfer (equalization) payments" than the richer, or "have", provinces do; this has been somewhat controversial. The richer provinces often favour freezing transfer payments, or rebalancing the system in their favour, based on the claim that they already pay more in taxes than they receive in federal government services, and the poorer provinces often favour an increase on the basis that the amount of money they receive is not sufficient for their existing needs.

Particularly in the past decade, critics have argued that the federal government's exercise of its unlimited constitutional spending power has contributed to strained federal-provincial relations. This power allows the federal government to influence provincial policies, by offering funding in areas that the federal government cannot itself regulate. The federal spending power is not expressly set out in the Constitution Act, 1867; however, in the words of the Court of Appeal for Ontario the power "can be inferred" from s. 91(1A), "the public debt and property".

A prime example of an exercise of the spending power is the Canada Health Act, which is a conditional grant of money to the provinces. Regulation of health services is, under the Constitution, a provincial responsibility. However, by making the funding available to the provinces under the Canada Health Act contingent upon delivery of services according to federal standards, the federal government has the ability to influence health care delivery.

=== Quebec and Canadian politics ===
Except for three short-lived transitional or minority governments, prime ministers from Quebec led Canada continuously from 1968 to early 2006. People from Quebec led both Liberal and Progressive Conservative governments in this period.

Monarchs, governors general, and prime ministers are now expected to be at least functional, if not fluent, in both English and French. In selecting leaders, political parties give preference to candidates who are fluently bilingual.

By law, three of the nine positions on the Supreme Court of Canada must be held by judges from Quebec. This representation makes sure that at least three judges have sufficient experience with the civil law system to treat cases involving Quebec laws.

== National unity ==
Canada has a long and storied history of secessionist movements (see Secessionist movements of Canada). National unity has been a major issue in Canada since the forced union of Upper and Lower Canada in 1840.

The predominant and lingering issue concerning Canadian national unity has been the ongoing conflict between the French-speaking majority in Quebec and the English-speaking majority in the rest of Canada. Quebec's continued demands for recognition of its "distinct society" through special political status has led to attempts for constitutional reform, most notably with the failed attempts to amend the constitution through the Meech Lake Accord and the Charlottetown Accord (the latter of which was rejected through a national referendum).

Since the Quiet Revolution, sovereigntist sentiments in Quebec have been variably stoked by the patriation of the Canadian constitution in 1982 (without Quebec's consent) and by the failed attempts at constitutional reform. Two provincial referendums, in 1980 and 1995, rejected proposals for sovereignty with majorities of 60% and 50.6% respectively. Given the narrow federalist victory in 1995, a reference was made by the Chrétien government to the Supreme Court of Canada in 1998 regarding the legality of unilateral provincial secession. The court decided that a unilateral declaration of secession would be unconstitutional. This resulted in the passage of the Clarity Act in 2000.

The Bloc Québécois, a sovereigntist party which runs candidates exclusively in Quebec, was started by a group of MPs who left the Progressive Conservative (PC) party (along with several disaffected Liberal MPs), and first put forward candidates in the 1993 federal election. With the collapse of the PCs in that election, the Bloc and Liberals were seen as the only two viable parties in Quebec. Thus, prior to the 2006 election, any gain by one party came at the expense of the other, regardless of whether national unity was really at issue. The Bloc, then, benefited (with a significant increase in seat total) from the impressions of corruption that surrounded the Liberal Party in the lead-up to the 2004 election. However, the newly unified Conservative party re-emerged as a viable party in Quebec by winning 10 seats in the 2006 election. In the 2011 election, the New Democratic Party succeeded in winning 59 of Quebec's 75 seats, successfully reducing the number of seats of every other party substantially. The NDP surge nearly destroyed the Bloc, reducing them to 4 seats, far below the minimum requirement of 12 seats for official party status.

Newfoundland and Labrador is also a problem regarding national unity. As the Dominion of Newfoundland was a self-governing country equal to Canada until 1949, there are large, though uncoordinated, feelings of Newfoundland nationalism and anti-Canadian sentiment among much of the population. This is due in part to the perception of chronic federal mismanagement of the fisheries, forced resettlement away from isolated settlements in the 1960s, the government of Quebec still drawing inaccurate political maps whereby they take parts of Labrador, and to the perception that mainland Canadians look down upon Newfoundlanders. In 2004, the Newfoundland and Labrador First Party contested provincial elections and in 2008 in federal ridings within the province. In 2004, then-premier Danny Williams ordered all federal flags removed from government buildings as a result of lost offshore revenues to equalization clawbacks. On December 23, 2004, premier Williams made this statement to reporters in St. John's,

They basically slighted us, they are not treating us as a proper partner in Confederation. It's intolerable and it's insufferable and these flags will be taken down indefinitely. It's also quite apparent to me that we were dragged to Manitoba in order to punish us, quite frankly, to try to embarrass us, to bring us out there to get no deal and send us back with our tail between our legs.

— Premier Danny Williams

Western alienation is another national-unity-related concept that enters into Canadian politics. Residents of the four western provinces, particularly Alberta, have often been unhappy with a lack of influence and a perceived lack of understanding when residents of Central Canada consider "national" issues. While this is seen to play itself out through many avenues (media, commerce, and so on.), in politics, it has given rise to a number of political parties whose base constituency is in western Canada. These include the United Farmers of Alberta, who first won federal seats in 1917, the Progressives (1921), the Social Credit Party (1935), the Co-operative Commonwealth Federation (1935), the Reconstruction Party (1935), New Democracy (1940) and most recently the Reform Party (1989).

The Reform Party's slogan "The West Wants In" was echoed by commentators when, after a successful merger with the PCs, the successor party to both parties, the Conservative Party won the 2006 election. Led by Stephen Harper, who is an MP from Alberta, the electoral victory was said to have made "The West IS In" a reality. However, regardless of specific electoral successes or failures, the concept of western alienation continues to be important in Canadian politics, particularly on a provincial level, where opposing the federal government is a common tactic for provincial politicians. For example, in 2001, a group of prominent Albertans produced the Alberta Agenda, urging Alberta to take steps to make full use of its constitutional powers, much as Quebec has done.

== Political conditions ==
Canada is considered by most sources to be a very stable democracy. In 2006, The Economist ranked Canada the third-most democratic nation in its Democracy Index, ahead of all other nations in the Americas and ahead of every nation more populous than itself. According to the V-Dem Democracy indices, in 2023 Canada was the 19th most electoral democratic country in the world.

More recently, with the existence of strong third parties and first-past-the-post elections amongst other factors, Canada on a federal and provincial level has experienced huge swings in seat shares, where third parties (e.g. NDP, Reform) end up (usually briefly) replacing the Liberals, the Progressive Conservatives or the Conservatives as the main opposition or even the government and leaving them as a rump. Such examples federally include the 1993 federal election with the collapse of the Progressive Conservatives, and the 2011 election leaving the Liberal Party a (temporary) rump along with Bloc Québécois. Other examples include the changes of fortune for the Alberta NDP during the province's 2015 and 2019 elections, and possibly the 2018 Quebec elections with the rise of Coalition Avenir Québec taking government from the Liberals and Parti Québécois.

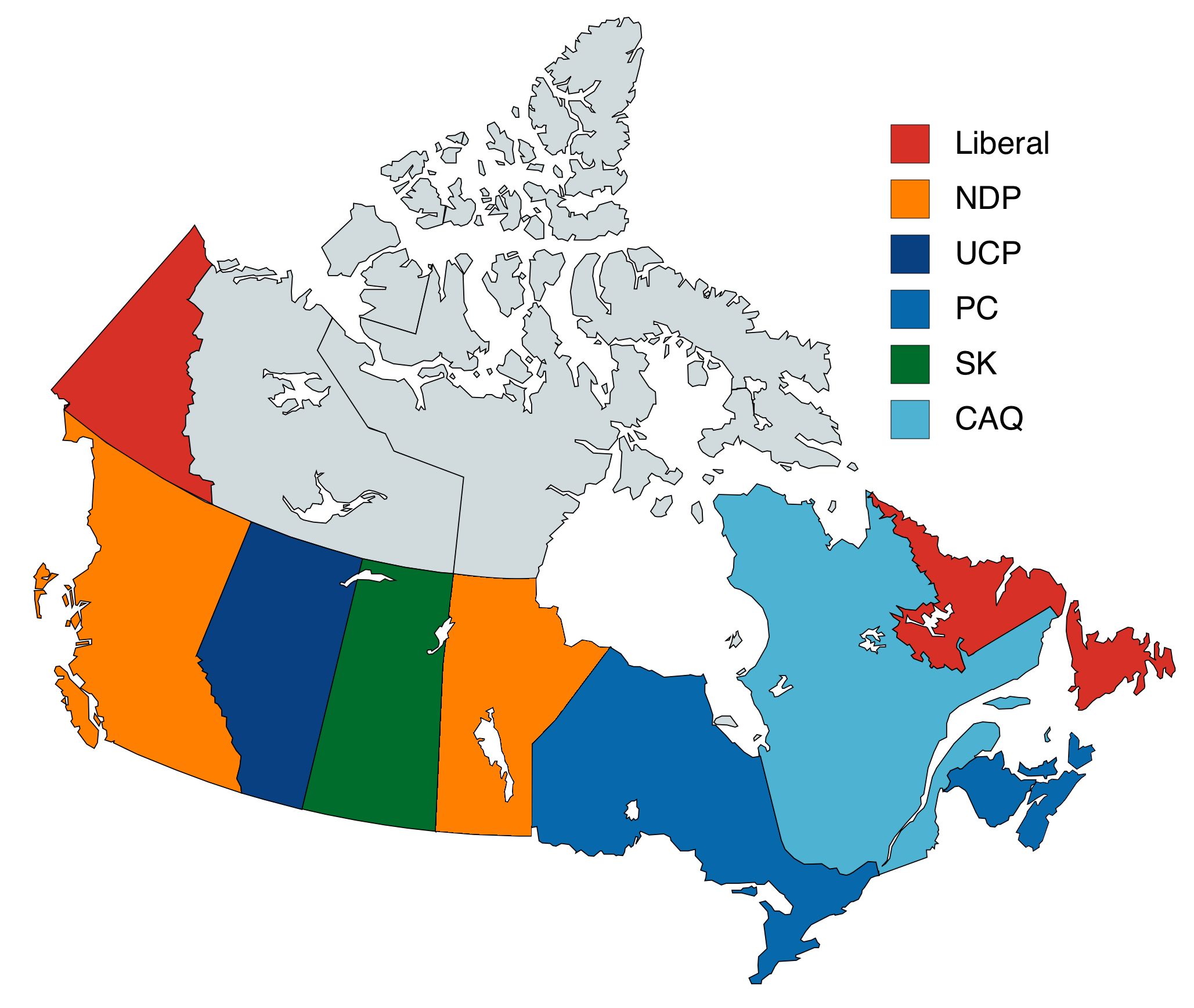
The governing political party(s) in each Canadian province as of 2025. Multicoloured provinces are governed by a coalition or minority government consisting of more than one party.

On a provincial level, in the legislatures of western provinces the NDP often is the left-leaning main party instead of that province's Liberal Party branch, the latter generally being a rump or smaller than the NDP. The other main party (right of the NDP) is either the Progressive Conservatives or their successor, or the Saskatchewan Party in Saskatchewan.

=== Party systems ===
According to recent scholars, there have been four party systems in [Canada] at the federal level since Confederation, each with its own distinctive pattern of social support, patronage relationships, leadership styles, and electoral strategies. Political scientists disagree on the names and precise boundaries of the eras, however. Steve Patten identifies four party systems in Canada's political history

Clarkson (2005) shows how the Liberal Party has dominated all the party systems, using different approaches. It began with a "clientelistic approach" under Laurier, which evolved into a "brokerage" system of the 1920s, 1930s and 1940s under Mackenzie King. The 1950s saw the emergence of a "pan-Canadian system", which lasted until the 1990s. The 1993 election — categorized by Clarkson as an electoral "earthquake" which "fragmented" the party system, saw the emergence of regional politics within a four party-system, whereby various groups championed regional issues and concerns. Clarkson concludes that the inherent bias built into the first-past-the-post system, has chiefly benefited the Liberals.

=== Party funding ===
The rules governing the funding of parties are designed to ensure reliance on personal contributions. Personal donations to federal parties and campaigns benefit from tax credits, although the amount of tax relief depends on the amount given. Also only people paying income taxes receive any benefit from this.

The rules are based on the belief that union or business funding should not be allowed to have as much impact on federal election funding as these are not contributions from citizens and are not evenly spread out between parties. The new rules stated that a party had to receive 2% of the vote nationwide in order to receive the general federal funding for parties. Each vote garnered a certain dollar amount for a party (approximately $1.75) in future funding. For the initial disbursement, approximations were made based on previous elections. The NDP received more votes than expected (its national share of the vote went up) while the new Conservative Party of Canada received fewer votes than had been estimated and was asked to refund the difference. Quebec was the first province to implement a similar system of funding many years before the changes to funding of federal parties.

Federal funds are disbursed quarterly to parties, beginning at the start of 2005. For the moment, this disbursement delay leaves the NDP and the Green Party in a better position to fight an election, since they rely more on individual contributors than federal funds. The Green Party now receives federal funds, since it for the first time received a sufficient share of the vote in the 2004 election.

In 2007, news emerged of a funding loophole that "could cumulatively exceed the legal limit by more than $60,000", through anonymous recurrent donations of $200 to every riding of a party from corporations or unions. At the time, for each individual, the legal annual donation limit was $1,100 for each party, $1,100 combined total for each party's associations, and in an election year, an additional $1,100 combined total for each party's candidates. All three limits increase on 1 April every year based on the inflation rate.

Two of the biggest federal political parties in Canada experienced a drop in donations in 2020, in light of the COVID-19 pandemic impact on the global economy.

=== Political parties, leaders and status ===
Ordered by number of elected representatives in the House of Commons

- Liberal Party: Mark Carney, Prime Minister of Canada
- Conservative Party: Pierre Poilievre
- Bloc Québécois: Yves-François Blanchet
- New Democratic Party: Avi Lewis
- Green Party: Elizabeth May

=== Leaders' debates ===
Leaders' debates in Canada consist of two debates, one English and one French, both produced by a consortium of Canada's five major television broadcasters (CBC/SRC, CTV, Global and TVA) and usually consist of the leaders of all parties with representation in the House of Commons.

These debates air on the networks of the producing consortium as well as the public affairs and parliamentary channel CPAC and the American public affairs network C-SPAN.

== Judiciary ==
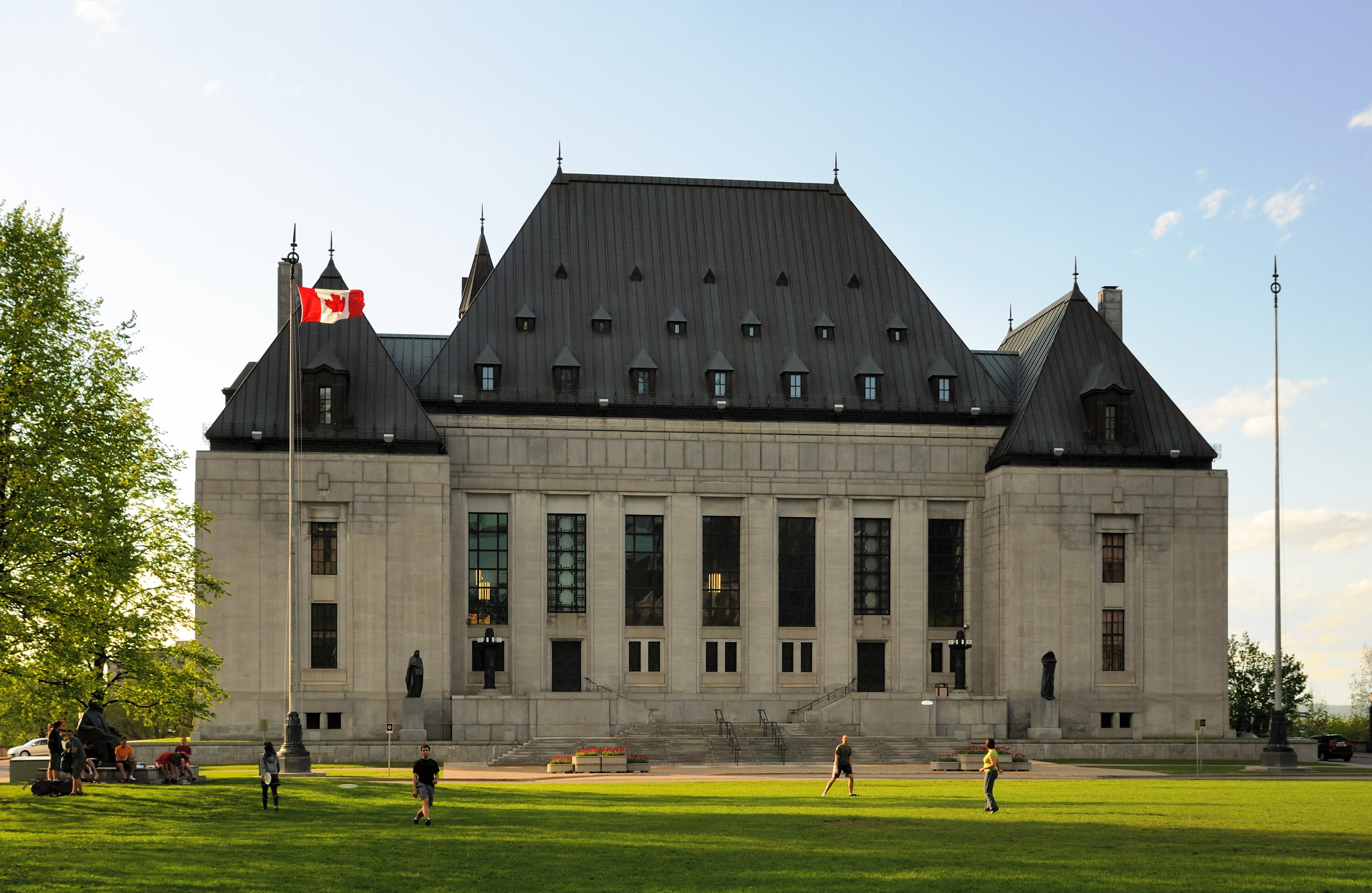
The Supreme Court of Canada is the highest court in the Canadian justice system.

== Government departments and structure ==
The Canadian government operates the public service using departments, smaller agencies (for example, commissions, tribunals, and boards), and crown corporations. There are two types of departments: central agencies such as Finance, Privy Council Office, and Treasury Board Secretariat have an organizing and oversight role for the entire public service; line departments are departments that perform tasks in a specific area or field, such as the departments of Agriculture, Environment, or Defence.

- Significant departments include Finance, Revenue, Human Resources and Skills Development, National Defence, Public Safety and Emergency Preparedness, and Foreign Affairs/International Trade.

Scholar Peter Aucoin, writing about the Canadian Westminster system, raised concerns in the early 2000s about the centralization of power; an increased number, role and influence of partisan-political staff; personal-politicization of appointments to the senior public service; and the assumption that the public service is promiscuously partisan for the government of the day.

== Elections ==
- Elections
  - House of Commons: direct plurality representation (last election held April 28, 2025)
  - Senate: appointed by the Governor General on the advice of the prime minister
- Election results:
2025 Canadian federal election results
- Summary of the 2025 Canadian federal election
  Party	Party leader	Candidates	Seats					Popular vote				
  Party	Party leader	Candidates	2021	Dissol.	2025	Change from 2021	% seats	Votes	Vote change	%	pp change	% where running
  Liberal	Mark Carney	342 (Note: In the riding of Ponoka—Didsbury, Zarnab Zafar was endorsed by the Liberal Party, but, due to a clerical error with Elections Canada, her party affiliation was not registered.)	160	152	169	▲9	49.27%	8,595,488	▲3,038,859	43.76%	▲11.14pp	43.91%
  Conservative	Pierre Poilievre	342 (Note: In the riding of Québec Centre, Conservative candidate Chanie Thériault had her paperwork rejected by Elections Canada; the party did not specify the reason(s).)	119	120	144	▲25	41.98%	8,113,484	▲2,366,074	41.31%	▲7.57pp	41.43%
  Bloc Québécois	Yves-François Blanchet	78	32	33	22	▼10	6.41%	1,236,349	▼65,276	6.29%	▼1.35pp	27.65%
  New Democratic	Jagmeet Singh	342 (Note: In the riding of South Shore—St. Margarets, NDP candidate Brendan Mosher dropped out of the race for personal reasons. Hayden Henderson was endorsed by the NDP, but was listed on the ballot as an Independent candidate.)	25	24	7	▼18	2.04%	1,234,673	▼1,801,675	6.29%	▼11.53pp	6.30%
  Green	Elizabeth May & Jonathan Pedneault	232	2	2	1	▼1	0.29%	238,892	▼158,096	1.22%	▼1.11pp	1.75%
  People's	Maxime Bernier	247	–	–	–	Steady	–	136,977	▼704,016	0.70%	▼4.24pp	0.94%
  Independent and No Affiliation		177 (Note: 159 Independents, 18 No Affiliation; 83 (74 Ind., 9 NA) participated in the Longest Ballot Committee protest in the riding of Carleton.)	–	3	–	Steady	–	39,498	▲7,017	0.20%	▲0.01pp	0.31%
  Christian Heritage	Rodney L. Taylor	32	–	–	–	Steady	–	10,065	▲1,080	0.05%	Steady	0.46%
  Rhinoceros	Chinook B. Blais-Leduc	29	–	–	–	Steady	–	7,063	▲978	0.04%	Steady	0.41%
  United (Note: Name changed to Reforge Party in 2026.)	Grant S. Abraham	16	New	–	–	New	–	6,061	New	0.03%	New	0.57%
  Libertarian (D)	Jacques Y. Boudreau	16	–	–	–	Steady	–	5,561	▲796	0.03%	Steady	0.57%
  Marxist–Leninist	Anna Di Carlo	35	–	–	–	Steady	–	4,996	▲464	0.03%	Steady	0.25%
  Communist	Elizabeth Rowley	24	–	–	–	Steady	–	4,685	▼15	0.02%	▼0.01pp	0.36%
  Centrist	A. Q. Rana	19	–	–	–	Steady	–	3,314	▲2,666	0.02%	▲0.02pp	0.31%
  Canadian Future	Dominic Cardy	19	New	–	–	New	–	3,123	New	0.02%	New	0.27%
  Animal Protection	Liz White	7	–	–	–	Steady	–	1,301	▼1,245	0.01%	Steady	0.32%
  Marijuana (D)	Blair T. Longley	2	–	–	–	Steady	–	133	▼1,898	0.00%	▼0.01pp	0.09%
  Vacant				4	—N/a							
  Total valid votes								19,641,663	▲2,727,388	100.00%	–	–
  Total rejected ballots								169,857	▼5,711	0.86%	▼0.16pp	–
  Total		1,959	338	338	343	▲5	100.00%			100.00%	–	100.00%
  Electorate (eligible voters)/turnout												–
  Note: Official results with two judicial recounts to be completed.
  Source(s): Elections Canada (D) indicates a party deregistered before the next election

== See also ==
- Censorship in Canada
- Constitutional debate in Canada
- Fair Vote Canada
- Federal political financing in Canada
- Hate speech laws in Canada
- List of Canadian federal electoral districts
- List of Canadian federal general elections
- List of Canadian political scandals
- List of political parties in Canada
- Populism in Canada
- Republicanism in Canada
- Socialism in Canada
