= Federal political financing in Canada =

The financing of federal political entities in Canada (including federal parties, riding associations, candidates, nomination contestants, leadership contestants, and registered third parties) is regulated under the Canada Elections Act. A combination of public and private funds finances the activities of these entities during and outside of elections.

== Overview ==
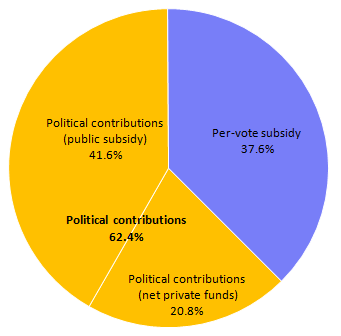

Canada's federal political parties receive the most significant portion of public funding at election times that is based on what they have spent through electoral expense reimbursements.

Between elections, until 2015, Canada's federal political parties have as their two primary sources of funding:

- Political contributions from individuals subsidized through tax credits – allocated according to monetary contributions.
- Per-vote subsidies – allocated according to the votes of Canadians.

These sources of funding determine, along with loans and secondary revenue sources, how much money the federal political parties have available to spend.

In 2015 the Per-vote subsidy was eliminated.

Table – Primary sources of public and private funding of the federal political parties in 2009
Subsidized political contributions		Per-vote subsidy	Total
Party level	Riding level	Per-vote subsidy	Total
$33.3 million	$12.7 million	$27.7 million	$73.7 million
$46 million		$27.7 million	$73.7 million
62.4%		37.6%	100%

(Source: Elections Canada)

== Public funding ==
Public funding of Canada's federal political parties is allocated in two ways:

- Per-vote subsidies (2004 to 2015) - allocated according to the votes of Canadians.
- Electoral expense reimbursements - reimbursements allocated according to party spending during election periods.

The per-vote subsidy (amounting to $27.7 million in 2009), also referred to as the "government allowance", the "quarterly allowance", or the "direct public subsidy", was argued by some political commentators to be the most democratic of the three funding mechanisms: The choices of 100% of voters of eligible parties (13,675,146 individual Canadians or 99% of all valid votes in the preceding election) are taken into account, all on an equal-basis.

The electoral expense reimbursement, which accounts for the largest part of the public financing following an election ($54 million in 2009), reimburses 50%-60% of a party's expenses on elections - the more a party spends during an election, the more public funds they get back.

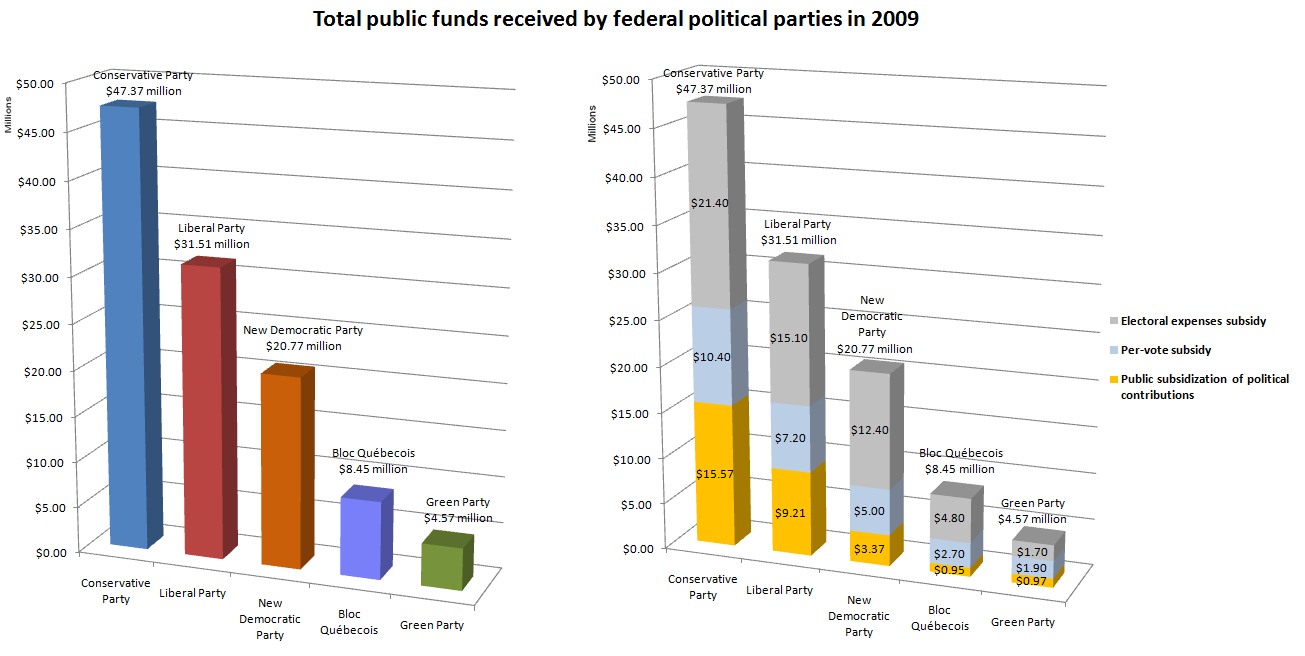

Table – Public financing of the top five federal political parties in 2009 (in millions)
Political party	Electoral expense reimbursements	Per-vote subsidy	Total public funding		
Conservative Party	$21.4	$10.4	$15.57	$47.37	42.0%
Liberal Party	$15.1	$7.2	$9.21	$31.51	28.0%
New Democratic Party	$12.4	$5.0	$3.37	$20.77	18.4%
Bloc Québécois	$4.8	$2.7	$0.95	$8.45	7.5%
Green Party	$1.7	$1.9	$0.97	$4.57	4.1%
Total (top five parties)	$55.4	$27.2	$30.07	$112.7	
Percentage of the overall public funding	49%	24%	27%		

(Tax credits approximate. Electoral expenses reimbursements include estimated riding/candidate level reimbursements. Sources: Elections Canada, Globe and Mail)

=== Previous to 2015 ===
Of the three ways in which federal parties are allocated public funding, the per-vote subsidy is largely argued as the most democratic as it rewards each vote absolutely equally. However, there are reasons to believe that it creates perverse incentives, such as running for votes where candidates cannot win, thus defeating (at least under first past the post voting) the party's own policy objectives, and muddying its potential alliances with every other party once legislatures sit. Election financing is a complex issue that has been studied in depth academically

100% of the voters of eligible parties (99% of all voters in the preceding election) have a say, with their input treated on an equal basis (1 voter, 1 vote).

The subsidy entered into effect on January 1, 2004, at $1.75 per vote (indexed to the Consumer Price Index) as part of a set of amendments made by the Jean Chrétien government to the Canada Elections Act which for the first time set limits on political contributions by individuals and organizations (corporations, unions, non-profit groups). The per-vote subsidy was introduced to replace the reliance of political parties and candidates on corporate, union, and wealthy donors in order to reduce the political influence of such donors.

After the 2006 court challenge to remove the 2%/5% threshold, the subsidy was reduced to $1.53 by the Harper government on April 1, 2012, and was reduced on each subsequent April 1, until its elimination in 2015.

=== Public subsidy of contributions ===
Political contributions are publicly subsidized via a personal income tax credit that credits 75% of the first $400 contributed, 50% of the amount between $400 and $750, and 33.33% of the amount over $750, up to a maximum tax credit of $650 (reached when contributions by an individual total $1,275 in one calendar year.) As of 2017, the maximum political contribution is $1,550 and increases by $25 each year thereafter. this can be given to the national organization of each party, the tax credit is $650, representing a subsidy of 42%.

Table - Individual political contributions made to federal political parties in 2009
Political party	Party level			Riding level			Total
Political party	Contributions received	Number of contributors	Percentage of contributors	Contributions received	Number of contributors	Percentage of contributors	Contributions received
Conservative Party	$17,702,201.05	101,385	55.75%	$5,646,513.18	41,227	43%	$23,348,714.23
Liberal Party	$9,060,916.11	37,876	20.83%	$4,760,216.56	30,426	31%	$13,821,132.67
New Democratic Party	$4,008,521.11	23,704	13.03%	$1,046,588.50	11,484	12%	$5,055,109.61
Green Party	$1,123,094.64	9,115	5.01%	$331,588.29	5,551	6%	$1,454,682.93
Bloc Québécois	$621,126.24	6,052	3.33%	$805,538.64	7,297	8%	$1,426,664.88
Christian Heritage Party	$284,420.20	953	0.52%	$102,147.66	751	1%	$386,567.86
Animal Alliance Environment	$292,950.20	1,816	1.00%	$0.00	0	0%	$292,950.20
Communist Party	$88,184.44	628	0.35%	$0.00	0	0%	$88,184.44
Marxist-Leninist Party	$39,130.00	85	0.05%	$0.00	0	0%	$39,130.00
Rhinoceros Party	$13,950.00	19	0.01%	$0.00	0	0%	$13,950.00
People's Political Power Party	$13,288.00	20	0.01%	$0.00	0	0%	$13,288.00
Canadian Action Party	$10,635.00	63	0.03%	$0.00	0	0%	$10,635.00
Libertarian Party of Canada	$6,587.44	40	0.02%	$0.00	0	0%	$6,587.44
Western Block Party	$5,260.00	56	0.03%	$0.00	0	0%	$5,260.00
Progressive Canadian Party	$5,018.00	40	0.02%	$2,774.00	24	0%	$7,792.00
Marijuana Party	$2,610.00	6	0.00%	$700.00	2	0%	$3,310.00
Total	$33,277,892.43	181,858	100%	$12,696,066.83	96,762	100%	$45,973,959.26

(Source: Elections Canada, Statement of Contributions Received, Part 2a)

(Note: The actual numbers of unique individual contributors are likely to be less than the totals shown as multiple anonymous contributions of under $20 by the same person are counted as separate contributors, and contributions made by the same person to both the riding level and at the party level, to different ridings, and/or to different parties are also all counted as separate contributors.)

=== Electoral expense reimbursement ===
When an election takes place, perhaps the most significant source of public funding for the federal political parties is the election expenses reimbursement which subsidizes 50% of the national campaign expenses of any party that obtains at least 2 per cent support, or at least 5 per cent in the ridings (electoral districts) in which they presented candidates. In addition to this, the parties' riding organizations are also reimbursed 60% of all expenses incurred by their candidates in each riding where they obtained at least 10% of the votes, plus 100% of allowable "personal expenses". The reimbursements are also referred to as "government rebates", "government transfers", or "election rebates".

Under this subsidy, the more a party spends, the more they are subsidized. The subsidy therefore magnifies the public funds allocated by tax credits on political contributions and by the per-vote subsidies. It also means that loans to political parties and their candidates can play a significant role in determining how much public money is received by the parties.

During the 2008 election, the Conservatives spent the most, and, as a result, received the largest reimbursements under this public subsidy in 2009.

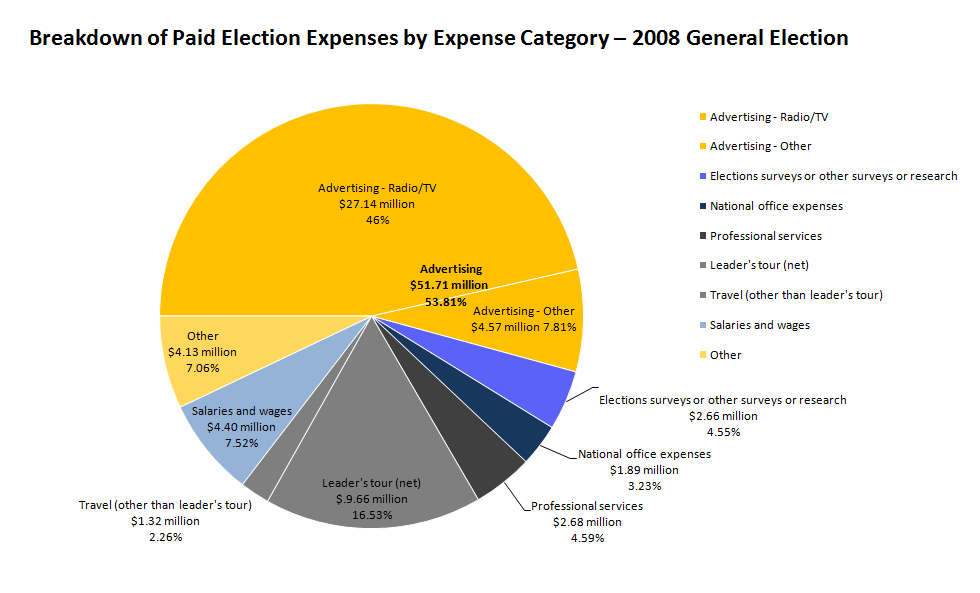
Breakdown of paid election expenses by expense category - 2008 general election (source: Election Canada

Table - National and riding electoral expense reimbursements received by the top five federal political parties in 2009 (in millions)
Political party	National expense reimbursements received	Riding expense reimbursements received	Total expense reimbursements	Share of the reimbursements to top five parties
Conservative Party	$9.7	$11.7	$21.4	39%
Liberal Party	$7.3	$7.8	$15.1	27%
New Democratic Party	$8.4	$4.1	$12.4	23%
Bloc Québécois	$2.4	$2.4	$4.8	9%
Green Party	$1.1	$0.6	$1.7	3%
Total (top five parties)	$28.90	$26.60	$55.5	
(Riding expense reimbursements estimated. Source: Globe and Mail)

=== Distribution of public funding amongst parties ===
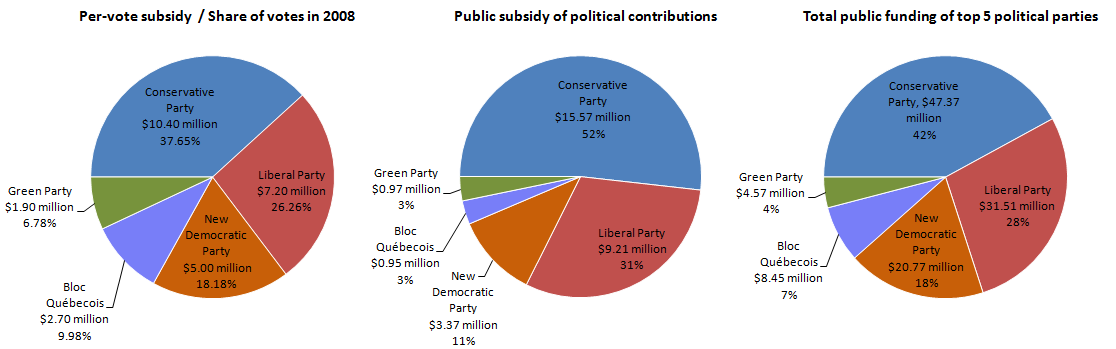

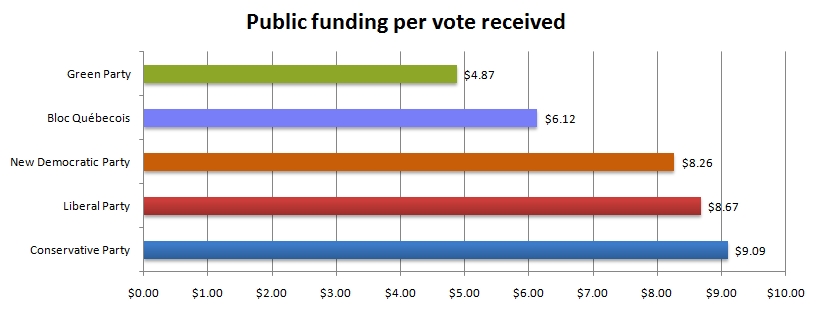
Public funding of the five largest federal political parties in 2009 per vote received in the preceding election

== Private funding ==
Private funding of the federal political parties occurs through political contributions made by individuals, but these contributions are vastly subsidized by public funds disbursed through tax credits.

As of 2021, the maximum yearly contribution limit is $1650 to a given federal political party, $1650 to a given party's riding associations, $1650 to a given party's leadership candidates, and $1650 for each independent candidate. The maximum total contribution is set at $3300. The total tax credit for all contributions is capped at $650, representing a subsidy of 42%.

Of the $46 million in political contributions received in 2009 by federal party organizations and riding associations, between $28.5 million and $31 million of the contributions was publicly funded - through tax credits amounting to between 62% and 67.5% - while between $15 million and $17.5 million was net private funding.

Table – Public and private financing of the top five federal political parties in 2009 (in millions)
Political party	Total net private funding received ($Mil)	Total public funding received ($Mil)	Total funding received ($Mil)	% private	% public	Votes received in 2008	Public funding per vote received (in $'s)	Share of the vote (in 2008)	Share of the public funding of top five parties
Conservative Party	$7.78	$47.37	$55.15	14.11%	85.89%	5,208,796	$9.09 per vote	37.65%	42.04%
Liberal Party	$4.61	$31.51	$36.12	12.76%	87.24%	3,633,185	$8.67 per vote	26.26%	27.97%
New Democratic Party	$1.69	$20.77	$22.46	7.52%	92.48%	2,515,561	$8.26 per vote	18.18%	18.43%
Bloc Québécois	$0.48	$8.45	$8.93	5.38%	94.62%	1,379,991	$6.12 per vote	9.98%	8%
Green Party	$0.48	$4.57	$5.05	9.50%	90.50%	937,613	$4.87 per vote	6.78%	4.06%
Total (top five parties)	$15.04	$112.67	$127.71	11.78%	88.22%	13,675,146	$8.24 per vote		

(Public funding includes electoral expenses reimbursements. Tax credits estimated. Sources: Elections Canada, Globe and Mail)

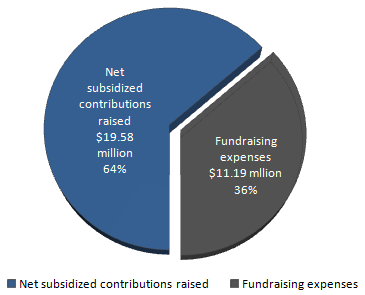
Fundraising costs vs. contributions raised at the party level for the top three Canadian federal parties in 2009

=== Cost of fundraising ===
In order to solicit political monetary contributions, fundraising is a major focus for many parties that involves hiring fundraising experts, and employing sophisticated database systems, email lists, newsletters, and telemarketing.

The Conservative Party, for example, is reported to make phone calls or send letters to about 200,000 people a month, and conducts surveys to collect and feed information on the views of individuals into its database referred to as CIMS, an acronym for "Constituent Information Management System". The information stored in the database is then used to customize mailings and phone calls for each targeted donor to appeal to them specifically on issues that they are known to react more strongly to.

Other associated overhead for fundraising include legal consultation, processing, accounting, auditing, and reporting costs.

Table - Cost of party-level fundraising of the top three federal political parties in 2009
Political party	Contributions raised	Fundraising expenses	% Overhead
Conservative Party	$17,702,201.05	$7,222,907	40.80%
Liberal Party	$9,060,916.11	$2,377,395	26.24%
New Democratic Party	$4,008,521.11	$1,594,566	39.78%
Total (top three parties)	$30,771,638.27	$11,194,868.00	36.38%

(Sources: Elections Canada, Globe and Mail)

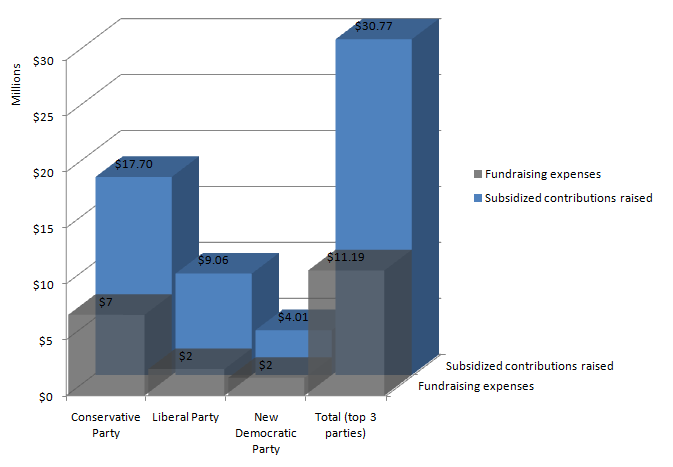
Party-level fundraising costs vs. party-level contributions raised at top three Canadian federal parties in 2009 (source: Elections Canada)

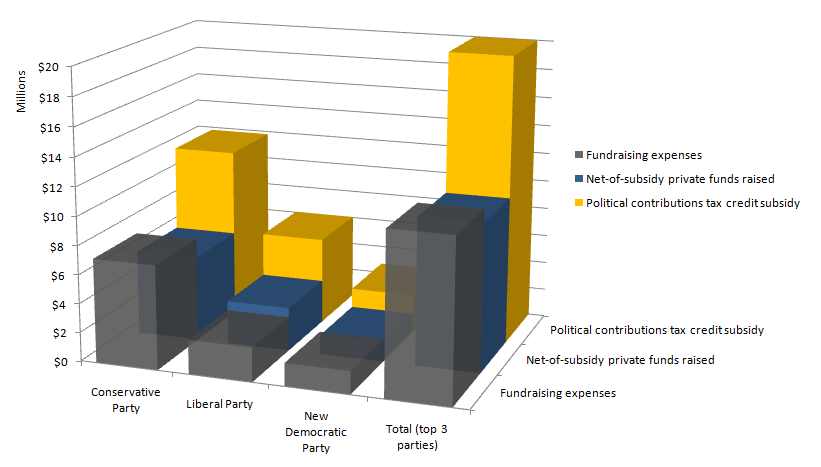
Party-level fundraising costs vs. net private funds raised at top three Canadian federal parties in 2009 (source: Elections Canada)

In 2009, the overhead cost of fundraising for the top three parties exceeded the net private funds they raised. They spent a combined $11.2 million on fundraising at the party level (riding-level expenses not included), according to their 2009 annual party returns, to raise approximately $10.3 million in net private funds.

== History ==
=== Election Expenses Act (1974) ===
The Election Expenses Act of 1974 introduced limits on election expenses for candidates and political parties, along with public funding in the form of partial reimbursements of expenses and tax credits for contributions.

As of January 1, 2004, the scope of legislation was enlarged to include electoral district associations, nomination contestants, and leadership contestants, and stricter limits on contributions were introduced.

At the same time, a new source of public funding was introduced in the form of the per-vote subsidy paid to registered parties. Until the ultimate discontinuation of the subsidy in 2015, every registered federal political party received an annual, inflation-indexed subsidy of $1.53-$2.04 per vote received in the preceding election.

In 2006, in an Ontario Court of Justice ruling, several small federal parties successfully challenged restrictions that limited expense reimbursements to parties receiving at least 2% of all valid votes cast in the preceding general election, or at least 5% of the valid votes cast in the electoral districts in which it had a candidate. Judge P. Theodore Matlow ruled that the law made it difficult for members of small parties to "play a meaningful role in the electoral process." The successful parties were reimbursed retroactively for the funds that had been withheld from them.

However, the removal of this restriction opened the government to criticism for its funding of controversial small parties including the Marijuana Party of Canada, Communist Party of Canada, and Christian Heritage Party of Canada, who had participated in the suit along with the less-controversial Green Party of Canada, Progressive Canadian Party of Canada and Canadian Action Party.

As of January 1, 2007, corporations and trade unions were barred from making political contributions.

The Keeping Canada’s Economy & Jobs Growing Act, introduced in October 2011, triggered a phase-out of the per-vote subsidy from 2012-2015.

The amount paid out to parties decreased from approximately $2 per vote in 2012 to approximately $0.50 per vote in 2015, the final year of the subsidy.

Contribution limits were increased in 2014. Spending limits for parties and candidates were increased by 5%.

== Debate over approaches to political financing ==
=== Per-vote subsidy ===
The elimination of the per-vote subsidy in 2015 attracted both support and opposition.

==== Debate over the subsidies ====
The Conservative Party has targeted the per-vote subsidy for elimination, while favouring the generous public subsidy of private political contributions. All of the other major Canadian parties – the Liberals, NDP, Bloc, and Green Party – oppose the elimination of the per-vote subsidy.

The Conservative government first tried to eliminate the per-vote subsidy in November 2008, just after the federal election of October 14, 2008. The Conservative party had not brought up the issue before Canadian voters during the election campaign, but on November 27 – days into its new mandate that began November 18 – the Conservative government attempted to eliminate the per-vote subsidy through a provision tucked within a fiscal update - and designated the update as a confidence motion that would trigger the fall of the government, and the prospect of another election, unless passed.

The Conservative government's move was seen by opposition members as a partisan attempt to bankrupt the other political parties and further increase their own party's financial advantage, and as a direct attack on the democratic process.

The move and its packaging as a confidence motion prompted the Liberals and the NDP to take steps toward forming a coalition government in the event the confidence motion was defeated. Suddenly faced with losing power, Harper sought the prorogation of Canada's Parliament.

Canada's Parliament was shut down from December 4, 2008, to January 26, 2009, allowing the Conservative government to avoid the confidence vote that it would have lost, and it backtracked on its attempt to eliminate the subsidy.

"His reputation as a peerless political chess-master is now somewhat in tatters, following what most perceive as an atypical near-fatal miscalculation over a Fall Economic and Fiscal Statement that lacked economic credibility and proposed the elimination of per vote subsidies for political parties. Faced with an opposition revolt, Harper first unusually retreated on the latter proposal, and then bought time by proroguing Parliament on December 4 to avoid a loss of confidence vote on December 8."

— January 2, 2009, diplomatic cable from the U.S. Embassy in Ottawa

In January 2011, however, the Conservative government again brought back its aim to eliminate the per-vote subsidy, over the opposition of all the other major parties, while continuing to favour the generous public subsidy of political contributions. Prime Minister Harper stated: "There are already generous credits and incentives in the tax system to encourage people to give to political parties today." He vowed that he would make the elimination of the per-vote subsidy a campaign pledge in the next federal election.

Green Party Leader Elizabeth May spoke against the attempt to eliminate the per-vote subsidy, saying that doing so would once again concentrate influence in the hands of those with deeper pockets, instead of giving voters a voice, and she stated her belief that the 2004 campaign finance reforms that introduced the per-vote subsidy are the "one area we've gotten really right" compared with the United States. Liberal deputy leader Ralph Goodale stated: "Mr. Harper’s position is, essentially, let the big and the wealthy and the most privileged run the show and all the other voices should simply be silenced."

In spite of the clear opposition by the other parties, in a campaign pledge in April 2011, Stephen Harper vowed to unilaterally eliminate the per-vote subsidy if he wins a majority. He stated: "Canadian political parties already have enormous tax advantages, there are credits when you donate to political parties, there are rebates when political parties do spending."

Bloc Québécois leader Gilles Duceppe accused Harper of seeking to cripple all other parties, stating: "Its runs against democracy. Parties trying to break through, like the Greens, would have practically no means. That guy would be happy with no opposition and no Parliament."

"Do we want to go back to the days where money, and those who can finance campaigns, determine the nature of our democracy?"

— NDP leader Jack Layton, April 2011

Other observers – including Canada's former Chief Electoral Officer Jean-Pierre Kingsley – have suggested that the subsidy of political contributions and subsidy of election expenses should also be examined, since both - to a far greater extent - have the effect of forcing taxpayers to fund parties they do not personally support.

==== Reaction to elimination of the per-vote subsidy ====
On May 25, 2011, just three weeks after the election that gave them majority power, the Conservatives announced that their June 6 federal budget would include the elimination of the per-vote subsidy.

NDP leader Jack Layton voiced his opposition to the plan, saying that "it's wrong", and "opens the door for big money to come back into politics", and he worried about the impact this will have on democracy in Canada.

The Conservative government's move was seen by many as motivated by a desire to destroy the Liberal party and cripple all other parties, not by concern over taxpayer dollars. According to University of Ottawa professor Errol Mendes: "You can see what's happening here, they're moving toward a process of eventually cutting the feet out from all the major opposition parties."

Interim Liberal leader Bob Rae stated: "I can’t think of anything more wrong than a spirit of vindictiveness at the heart of a majority government." He said the Liberals would oppose the plan, and stated: "The notion that there’s public support for the political process and political parties is widely accepted in a great many democratic countries around the world."

"It is a mean-spirited attempt by the Harper government to limit the resources of other parties and to create a situation where the wealthiest will have the most influence. The simple and very inexpensive per-vote subsidy is a very fair way to ensure that parties would be funded based on their popular support, allowing them the resources to represent those that support their respective views."

— Glen Hodgson, Green Party, May 2011

According to political scientist Ned Franks of Queen's University, the elimination of the per-vote subsidy will mean that political parties with a rich support base will now be far better off than parties whose supporters are poorer or who are not the type to make political donations. He stated that the move greatly favours the Conservative party: "There's only one party who benefits, and — surprise, surprise — it's the Conservatives."

Layton stated the move was anti-democratic since it would benefit parties with access to rich people, and handicap parties with a lower-income voting base. "I think that our democracy is better served if ideas have equal opportunity in the competition for Canadians' consideration, and that's what public financing is designed to do. Take away public financing and what you're basically saying is those with the best ability to raise money get to have their ideas heard, and I don't think that's helpful for a democratic society."

— NDP MP Jack Harris, May 25, 2011

==== Consequences of eliminating the per-vote subsidy ====
Elimination of the per-vote subsidy, with all other things remaining equal, would mean that a very small number of individuals - somewhere between 0.8% and 1.2% of registered voters in 2009 - would control and direct 100% of all the funding to their preferred political parties and candidates.

By the same token, approximately 98-99% of all registered voters would no longer have any participation in how any of the funding is directed - including having no say at all in how any of the taxpayer money involved gets allocated.

In April 2011, Canada's former Chief Electoral Officer Jean-Pierre Kingsley, who served in the position for 17 years, stated that if the per-vote subsidy were to be eliminated, there would be an increased risk of Canada's political parties turning back toward corporations to obtain money, also to the detriment of Canadian democracy.

"Parties will have to find ways of getting money. And there may well be pressure to come back to funding from corporate sources—the very things we've attempted to eliminate and have successfully eliminated. Which would bring us back to a regime where donations not by individuals but through other interests, political parties would be beholden to, other than normal Canadians."

— former Chief Electoral Officer Jean-Pierre Kingsley, April 6, 2011

The elimination of the per-vote subsidy could also have the effect of further reducing an already low voter turnout by removing an incentive that encourages many Canadian citizens to vote. Under the first-past-the-post system, the per-vote subsidy ensures that a voter's participation at the ballot box will at least still make a difference even if their preferred riding candidate has very little chance of winning or is assured of a win.

=== Magnification of the choices of contributors ===
While only a tiny fraction of registered voters make political contributions, their net contributions get magnified several times over by the public subsidy of political contributions and the public subsidy of election expenses.

Over half of all the public funding for federal parties in 2009 was effectively directed by less than 1.2% of the number of registered voters in Canada, without participation by 99% of registered voters.

Overall, the subsidy of political contributions resulted in 64.2% of all of the funding in 2009 being directed according to the partisan preferences of less than 1.2% of registered voters.

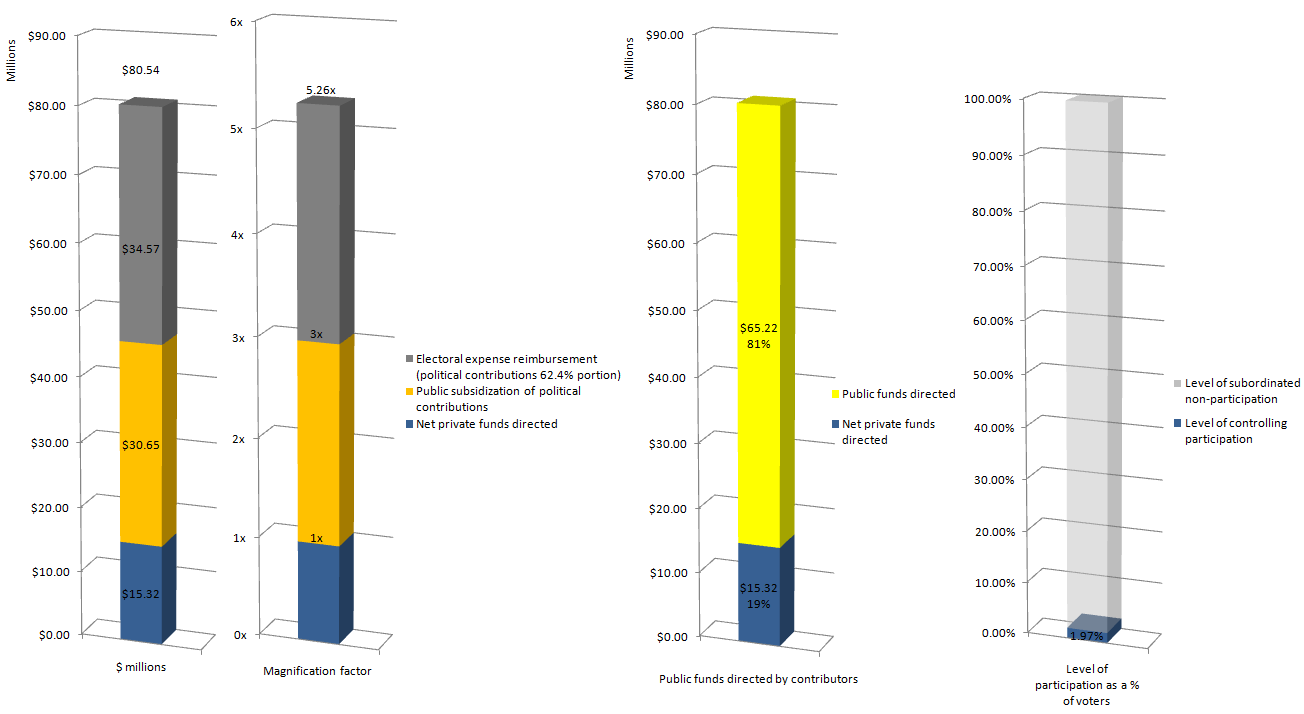

=== Composition of participation ===
With the per-vote subsidy, 100% of voters of eligible parties (99% of all valid votes in 2009) participate in determining the distribution of the funds, and do so all on an equal basis. The participants are all the Canadian citizens over the age of 18 that voted in the preceding federal election, and numbered 13,675,146 Canadians in 2009.

With political contributions, the participants - numbering only a nationwide total of between 196,186 and 278,620 unique individuals in 2009, and representing less than 1.2% of the number of registered voters - tend to be individuals that have more disposable income. The poor, by and large, do not make political contributions, and, according to University of Calgary political finance expert Lisa Young, people that have more comfortable means, and that can expect to obtain a larger tax credit against their income, are more likely to make political contributions.

According to McMaster University political scientist Henry Jacek, political contributions tend to come from the wealthy, and not the poor. It is also clear from other jurisdictions in the world that political donors typically are people that have more disposable income.

While political contributions can only be made by Canadian citizens, there is no age restriction in place, which allows political contributions to be made in the name of children to bypass contribution limits.

In 2006, Liberal leadership candidate Joe Volpe returned $27,000 in political contributions that had been made in the name of children - after it was revealed that his campaign donors included 11-year-old twin boys and a 14-year-old boy who donated $5,400 each, the allowed maximum. The children and several other donors that had contributed the maximum allowable $5,400 each - for a total of $108,000 - were all in some way connected to the top corporate executives of one pharmaceutical company. No law was broken.

=== Level of participation in determining funding ===
In 2009, a national total of 181,858 individuals (out of 23,677,639 registered voters in 2008) made political contributions to a federal political party organization, resulting in a 0.77% fraction of registered voters directing over $33 million in subsidized contributions - almost two-thirds of it publicly funded - toward their preferred parties. Over 55% of these individuals were Conservative party supporters.

A national total of 96,762 individuals also made political contributions at the riding association level to a federal political party, resulting in a 0.4% fraction of registered voters directing over $12 million in subsidized contributions - over 60% of it from public funds - toward their preferred parties.

Combined, the number of unique individuals that made political contributions in 2009 to a federal political party, either at the national party organization level or riding level, or both, is somewhere between 196,186 and 278,620 individuals – representing between 0.8% and 1.2% of the number of registered voters from 2008.

Rounding to the nearest percentage, only 1% of registered voters directed $46 million – representing over 62% of the primary funding received by parties – toward their preferred party, with nearly two-thirds of that - $28.5-$31 million - in public funds directed without the consent of 99% of registered voters.

Table – Primary funding sources in 2009 and level of participation
Funding method	Number of participants	Level of participation / % controlling (as a % of voters)	Level of non-participation / % subordinate (as a % of voters)	Net private funding	Public funding	% of the primary public funding	% of the overall primary funding of parties
Subsidized political contributions	196,186 - 278,620	1.4% - 2.0%	98% - 98.6%	$15.0-$17.5 million	$28.5-$31.0 million	50.7% - 52.8%	62.4%
Per-vote subsidy	13,675,146	98.9%	1.1%	-	$27.7 million	47.2%- 49.3%	37.6%

(Source: Elections Canada)

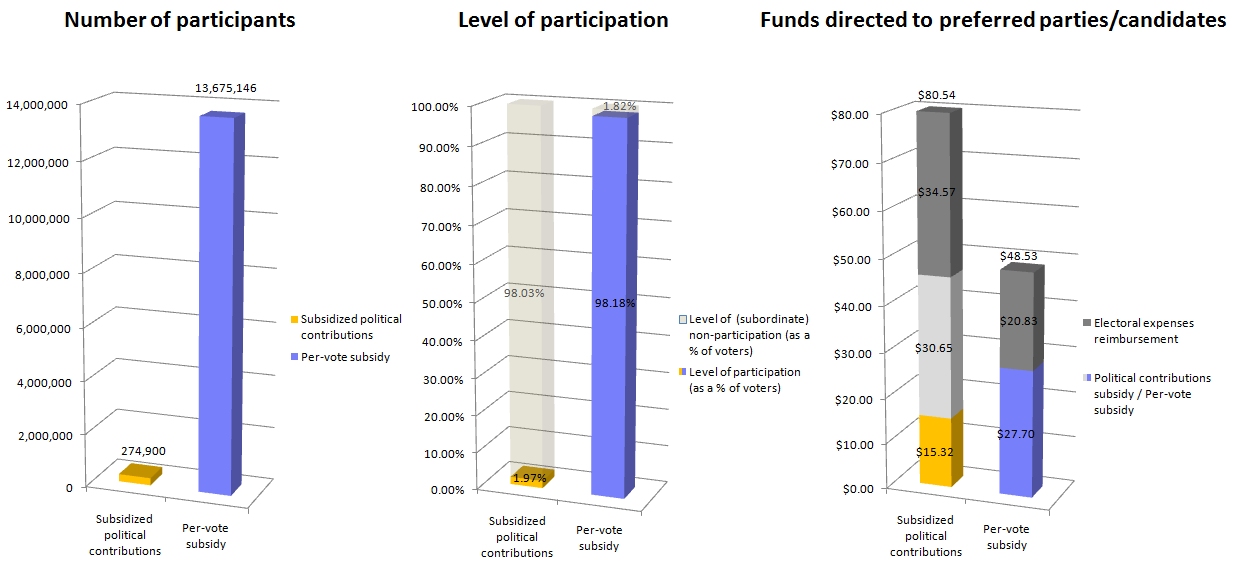

=== Corrupting influence of fundraising ===
In 2006, it was revealed during the Liberal leadership contest that one candidate, Joe Volpe, had received a total of $108,000 in contributions from 20 individuals that were all in some way connected to the top corporate executives of Apotex Pharmaceuticals. Each of the 20 individuals – which included 11-year-old twin boys and a 14-year-old boy – gave exactly $5,400, the maximum allowed at the time.

According to political financing expert Louis Massicotte, a political scientist from Université Laval, political systems that rely heavily on political contributions from individuals can encourage corruption. In 2010–2011, it was discovered that corporations had been funnelling money to major provincial political parties by disguising the corporate funds as individual political contributions made by their employees, circumventing the political fundraising laws. Former employees of one corporation flatly admitted that political contributions had illicitly been made in their name.

At the provincial level in Quebec, the far-reaching influence of fundraisers over everything from the selection of judges to the distribution of construction contracts fuelled widespread demand for a public inquiry into political corruption, and caused the Jean Charest Liberal government and other major political parties to agree to increase the provincial per-vote subsidy as a way to reduce the influence of party bagmen (influence peddling political fundraisers) over government decisions and policies.

=== Transparency ===
Until the enactment of the Elections Modernization Act in 2018, political parties were only required to report the identities of contributors that had given a total of over $200 to one riding association or the central organization. For donations of $200 or less, receipts had to be kept by the individual riding associations, but Elections Canada had no way to keep track of them. Completely anonymous contributions of $20 or less are permitted.

Disclosure of political contributors to Elections Canada in 2009 (all federal parties and riding associations) (source: Elections Canada)

Table – Disclosure of political contributors in 2009 (all federal parties and riding associations)
	Party-level		Riding-level		Combined	
Number of listed contributors	40,712	22.39%	16,398	16.95%	57,110	20.50%
Number of unlisted contributors of amounts of $200 or less	139,140	76.51%	51,491	53.21%	190,631	68.42%
Total number of anonymous contributors of amounts of $20 or less	2,006	1.10%	28,873	29.84%	30,879	11.08%
Total number of contributors	181,858		96,762		278,620	
Total number of contributors not identified to Election Canada	141,146	77.61%	80,364	83.05%	221,510	79.50%

(Source: Elections Canada)

In 1997, Industry Minister John Manley disclosed the identities of individuals and corporations that contributed $10,150 and $15,800, respectively, to his re-election campaign. However, he did not disclose where $74,664 – received through his riding association – had originally come from.

In July 2002, Paul Martin refused to reveal the names of donors to his leadership campaign, claiming that new disclosure rules brought in a month earlier applied only to current cabinet and not to a former cabinet minister as he was, and that he did not think it would be fair to name people who had donated to his campaign before the new disclosure rules were in effect.

In October 2002, Stephen Harper initially did not reveal the names of anyone who had donated to his leadership campaign. While he later quietly posted a few names – those of 54 donors who had given more than $1,075 each – he continued to keep secret the identities of 10 other large donors and the names of more than 9,000 donors who gave sums of less than $1,000 each.

In 2009, an annual report by Global Integrity, an independent non-profit organization that tracks corruption trends around the world, said that Canada posted a slight "downward tick" based on secrecy surrounding political financing and gaps in government accountability.

According to Global Integrity, "Canada is a really interesting case" in that while it had a generally positive rating, there are "unique gaps in the system that are strange", including that political financing loans to candidates are confidential.

According to Ottawa-based Democracy Watch: "Government integrity continues to be undermined by loopholes that allow secret donations to some candidates."

=== Loopholes in contributions limits ===
Elections Canada confirmed in 2007 that individuals could illegally contribute as much as $60,500 over the $1,100 limit and not be detected - simply by donating $200 to each of a party's 308 riding associations.

Elections Canada claimed that it currently cannot track donations of $200 or less because "we do not get the receipts" from the individual riding associations. Under current regulations, a party's individual riding associations are only required to report the identities of contributors with total contributions to the riding of over $200. Contributions of $200 or less are allowed to be reported in aggregate, with no break-down by contributor required that would allow for proper cross-checking across a party's ridings associations.

At the time, the NDP called for the loophole to be plugged. The Conservative government responded that "this is no more a loophole than the fact that someone can break the law by fraudulently misstating their income on their income tax." It rejected calls by the opposition for Elections Canada to be given new measures and tools to be able to detect multiple donations across a party's ridings that exceed the contribution limit.

== See also ==
- The 2008–2009 Prorogation of Parliament
- Prorogation in Canada
- In and Out scandal
- Elections in Canada
- Elections Canada
- Chief Electoral Officer (Canada)
- Canadian electoral system
- Voter turnout in Canada
- Money trail
- Occupy Canada
