= Caroline J. Simard =

Canadian civil servant

Commissioner of Canada Elections
- In office August 2022 – 2032
- Appointed by: Stéphane Perrault
- Preceded by: Yves Côté

Personal details
- Education: Bachelors in Law - University of Montreal; Masters in International Law - Université du Québec à Montréal; Doctor of Civil Law - McGill University

Caroline Simard is a Canadian civil servant who, since 2022, has been the Commissioner of Canada Elections. She had previously served as the Vice Chair of Broadcasting at the Canadian Radio-television and Telecommunications Commission (CRTC), and had been Legal Council in Innovation, Science and Economic Development Canada and an expert in the UN International Telecommunication Union. Simard holds 'Top Secret' security clearance.

She holds degrees in law from the University of Montreal, the University of Quebec in Montreal, and McGill University. Her Doctoral thesis, from McGill's Institute of Comparative Law, is entitled "The regulatory principle of techno-economic neutrality as a tool for implementing new generation networks".
