= FactsCan =

- Available in: English
- Website: factscan.ca
- Commercial: Yes
- Launched: 2015; 11 years ago
- Current status: Inactive

FactsCan (Facts Canada), established in 2015, is/was a Canadian federal politics fact-checker. As of March 7, 2019, their Facebook page indicates that it has gone "into indefinite hibernation." Because they have been run by a small volunteer team, they have run out of time and financial resources.

It provided resources and analysis on statements relating to federal politics in Canada, and has signed the International Fact-Checking Network fact-checkers' code of principles.

FactsCan has been covered in Canadian and international media and fact checked federal politics in Canada.
