= Canadian electoral system =

The Canadian electoral system is based on a parliamentary system of government modelled on that of the United Kingdom.

== Federal parliament ==
The Parliament of Canada consists of:

- The sovereign (represented by the governor general)
- An upper house (the Senate), the members of which are appointed by the governor general on the recommendation of the prime minister
- A lower house (the House of Commons), the members of which are chosen by the citizens of Canada through federal general elections.

Elections Canada is the non-partisan agency responsible for the conduct of elections in Canada, including federal elections, by-elections and referendums. It is headed by the chief electoral officer.

=== Representation in the House of Commons ===
Representation in the House of Commons is based on electoral districts, also known as constituencies or ridings. Each riding elects one member to the House of Commons, and the number of members overall and the number of members in each province is established through a formula set out in the Constitution of Canada.

Riding boundaries are established by independent commissions, and take into account:

- population
- social links
- economic links

New commissions are set up every ten years to make any necessary revisions to existing boundaries, following criteria defined in the Electoral Boundaries Readjustment Act. The process of redefining electoral boundaries is called redistribution, and the results are recorded in a "representation order". The Representation Order of 2003 set the number of ridings at 308. The 2012 redistribution set the number of ridings to 338.

== Electoral method ==
=== Single-member plurality ===
Canada's electoral system is a "first-past-the-post" system, which is formally referred to as a single-member plurality system. The candidate who receives the most votes in a riding, even if not a majority of the votes, wins a seat in the House of Commons and represents that riding as its member of Parliament (MP). When a party wins a majority of seats, the governor general asks the party leader to form a government; that leader becomes prime minister. When no party attains a majority, the current prime minister may resign immediately, or choose to stay in office and attempt to win the confidence of a majority of the House. If they resign (either immediately or following a vote of no confidence), the governor general will invite the leader of the opposition party most likely to enjoy the confidence of the House to form a government. The largest party by seat count that is not the government or part of a governing coalition becomes the Official Opposition. That party receives more finances and prestige than the other opposition parties.

An absolute majority of the votes cast in the last election is not needed to have power, and is rarely achieved. As well, the party in power does not need to have a majority of seats in the House of Commons – and under the current multi-party system, quite often does not have that. However to pass bills, the governing party must have support of a majority of MPs. Without majority support, the government falls and a new party is named government or an election has to be held. Only the Liberals and Conservatives (the original Conservative Party of Canada, Progressive Conservatives and modern Conservatives) have formed the federal government in Canada.

=== Turnout ===
Voter turnout fell dramatically between 1962 (79%) and 2011 (61.4%). Voter turnout rose higher in 2015 to 68.5%, and then dropped to 66% in 2019.

=== Proportionality of representation ===
The Gallagher Index (GI) of disproportionality for Canadian federal elections from 1962 to 2011 has ranged from 6.26 to 20.91, in line with some of its comparables – Australia, New Zealand (prior to adoption of MMP in 1992) and United States (presidential electoral college) – but has been significantly higher than many others where a form of proportional representation is used; for example, Belgium, Germany, Ireland, and Scandinavian countries. In part due to Canada's uncommon combination of a four- or five-cornered party system and its use of the first-past-the-post voting election system, Canada's GI rating is sometimes higher than that of the United States House of Representatives.

=== Timing of election ===
Historically, the prime minister could ask the governor general to call an election at virtually any time, although one had to be called no later than five years after the return of the writs under section 4 of the Canadian Charter of Rights and Freedoms. In 2007, the Conservative Parliament passed an act requiring fixed election dates in Canada every four years. This law does not curtail the power of the governor general to dissolve Parliament at any time, as was done for the 2025 election at the request of Prime Minister Mark Carney.

If a government loses a confidence motion, traditionally the prime minister will ask the governor general to call an election. The governor general when approached by the prime minister who has lost a vote of confidence will traditionally call an election. However, it is not assured as some assume. The governor general also has the right to call the leader of the party they think would be most likely to be able to form a government and ask them if they can form the government. This happened in 1926 and is referred to as the King-Byng Affair.

=== Running for office ===
Any number of candidates may run for election in an electoral district, but each candidate may only run in one district, either independently or under the banner of a political party. Each party may endorse only one candidate per riding. Candidates who run for election without party affiliation may be designated as independent or as having no affiliation.

A political party is a group of people who together:

- Establish a constitution and by-laws
- Elect a leader and other officers
- Endorse candidates for election to the House of Commons.

To obtain the right to put the party name on the ballot, under the names of the candidates it endorses, a political party must register with the chief electoral officer. As of 2022, there were 22 registered political parties operating at the federal level in Canada.

=== Governing party ===
After an election, the party with the most elected representatives (members of Parliament or MPs) usually becomes the governing party. If the leader of this party is not already the prime minister, the leader is summoned by the governor general and sworn in as Prime Minister of Canada shortly after the election concludes. The party with the second largest number of MPs is called the Official Opposition. Each of the elected candidates has a seat in the House of Commons, where they debate and vote on draft legislation (called bills) and thus attempt to have an influence on government policy. A party having a majority of the seats can pass what it wants despite any opposition from the groups holding the minority of seats, but the imperative to be re-elected and any moral pressure the opposition can impose may temper its legislative agenda.

== Right to vote ==
All citizens (18 years and older) have the right to a voice in choosing their parliamentary representatives. Canada's electoral law requires the chief electoral officer to inform the public about the system and about individual rights under that system and to remove obstacles that may make voting difficult for some.

=== Information to voter ===
During an election, Elections Canada informs Canadians about their right to vote, how to get on the National Register of Electors and the voter's list, and where and how they can vote. Its public information activities include

- News releases.
- Advertisements in newspapers and on television and radio, brochures, posters.
- A toll-free telephone inquiries center.
- A website.
- Meetings with community and ethnocultural groups.

Between elections, the agency publishes additional background information for the public, keeps its telephone enquiries centre and website open to answer questions, and works with educators to encourage young people to vote when they become eligible (18 years and older).

=== Voting accommodations ===
Helping to remove obstacles to voting is an important part of Elections Canada's work. Voters who are not able to vote on polling day can vote at the advance polls. A mail-in special ballot is available for Canadians who are away from their ridings, travelling or temporarily resident overseas. Even Canadians in their own ridings during the election period may use the special ballot if they do not wish to go to a polling station. In special cases, electors with a disability may vote at home, in the presence of an election officer. Mobile polls serve voters living in certain institutions, such as nursing homes for people who are elderly or who have a disability.

Wherever possible, election officers at polling stations speak both official languages (English and French). In addition, a deputy returning officer can appoint and swear in an interpreter to help communicate with a voter.

All votes are made on the same standard heavy paper ballot, which is inserted in a standard cardboard box, furnished by Elections Canada. The ballot and the box are devised to ensure that no one except the elector knows the individual choice that was made.

== Voting reform ==
In 2021, Prime Minister Justin Trudeau said he was in favour of adopting the single-winner ranked voting system known as instant-runoff voting or preferential voting.

Trudeau promised electoral reform in the 2015 campaign but did not develop a consensus with other political parties. He stated he could not implement electoral reform if all parties were not in agreement. Each party had different suggestions, with some wanting to retain first-past-the-post. Very few government proposals have approval of every political party represented in the House of Commons.

== See also ==
- Fair Vote Canada
- Federal political financing in Canada
- List of Canadian federal electoral districts
- National Register of Electors
- International Register of Electors
- Longest Ballot Committee
