= Jean-Marc Hamel =

Canadian government official (1925–2024)

4th Chief Electoral Officer of Canada
- In office 1966–1990
- Preceded by: Nelson Jules Castonguay
- Succeeded by: Jean-Pierre Kingsley

Personal details
- Born: February 19, 1925 Lotbinière, Quebec, Canada
- Died: May 24, 2024 (aged 99) Ottawa, Ontario, Canada
- Education: Université Laval

Jean-Marc Hamel, OC (February 19, 1925 – May 24, 2024) was a Canadian government official. He was the Chief Electoral Officer from 1966 to 1990.

Born in Lotbinière, Quebec, he received a Bachelor of Commerce degree in 1948 and a Master of Commerce degree in 1949 from Université Laval. He received a M.P.A. from Syracuse University in 1956.

In 1990, he was made an Officer of the Order of Canada for "his ability to work with political parties, candidates, the media and the general public helped to foster the atmosphere of confidence now associated with the entire Canadian electoral system".

Hamel was predeceased by his wife Jacqueline in April 2002. He died on May 24, 2024, at the age of 99.

== Sources ==
- Elections Canada biography
- Canadian Who's Who 1997 entry

Government offices
Preceded by Nelson Jules Castonguay	Chief Electoral Officer; 1966–1990	Succeeded by Jean-Pierre Kingsley
