= Marc Mayrand =

Canadian public servant

6th Chief Electoral Officer of Canada
- In office 2007–2016
- Preceded by: Jean-Pierre Kingsley
- Succeeded by: Stéphane Perrault

Personal details
- Born: Trois-Rivières, Quebec, Canada
- Education: University of Ottawa; London School of Economics
- Profession: Lawyer, Civil servant

Marc Mayrand is a Canadian public servant who served as Superintendent of Bankruptcy from 1 May 1997, until his appointment as the sixth Chief Electoral Officer of Canada on 21 February 2007; he led Elections Canada for nearly ten years, until his resignation on 28 December 2016.

== Career ==
Mayrand studied law at the University of Ottawa and the London School of Economics.

He taught briefly, then joined the national Office of the Superintendent of Bankruptcy in 1982, and stayed until 2007. He rose to the top job there in 1997.

In 2007, he was appointed Chief Electoral Officer of Elections Canada, an independent agency of the Parliament of Canada responsible for supervising the election campaign financing and voting methods. He refused to alter the voting procedure to require Muslim women to remove their veils, as it was not a requirement under the Canada Elections Act.

Months after the 41st Canadian general election, he released his report on that election on 17 August 2011. He called on Parliament to revamp the Canada Elections Act. He recommended lifting the blackout of television and radio election coverage in areas where polls are still open. The blackout was made moot, because of the expansion of the use of social media, stating that, "The growing use of social media puts in question not only the practical enforceability of the rule, but also its very intelligibility and usefulness in a world where the distinction between private communication and public transmission is quickly eroding." He also called for new methods to vote, especially digitally, either via the Internet or tabulator machines.

Mayrand announced that he was stepping down from his position as of December 28, 2016 in order to allow his successor to be involved in any changes the government should choose to make to the voting system in Canada.
