= Commissioner of Canada Elections =

Canadian electoral regulation officer

- Commissaire aux élections fédérales
- Incumbent; Caroline J. Simard since August 15, 2022
- Office of the Chief Electoral Officer of Canada
- Appointer: Chief Electoral Officer
- Term length: 10 years non-renewable
- Constituting instrument: Canada Elections Act
- Precursor: Commissioner of Election Expenses
- Formation: 1974
- Website: https://www.cef-cce.ca/

The Commissioner of Canada Elections (French: Commissaire aux élections fédérales) is responsible for enforcing the Canada Elections Act, the primary electoral law in Canada, and the regulation of Canadian federal elections and referendums more generally. The commissioner and their office are part of the Office of the Chief Electoral Officer of Canada.

== Appointment ==
The Commissioner is appointed by the Chief Electoral Officer in consultation with the Director of Public Prosecutions. The Commissioner is appointed for a term of ten years, which is non-renewable.

Individuals who have been candidates for an elected office, or an employee of a registered political party are barred from being appointed to the office of Commissioner.

=== Office Holders ===
| | Name | From | To |
|---|---|---|---|
| 1* | John P. Dewis | 1974 | 1976 |
| 2* | Joseph Oswald Gorman | 1976 | 1987 |
| 3 | George M. Allen | 1988 | 1991 |
| 4 | Raymond A. Landry | 1992 | 2006 |
| 5 | William H. Corbett | 2007 | 2012 |
| 6 | Yves Côté, QC | 2013 | 2022 |
| 7 | Caroline J. Simard | 2022 | |

*As Commissioner of Election Expenses

== History ==
The role of the Commissioner was established in 1974 as the Commissioner of Election Expenses with restricted responsibilities for enforcing rules around expenses incurred by federal election campaigns and referendums.

In 1977, the Commissioner's role was extended to cover enforcement of all sections of the Canada Elections Act. The role was further expanded in 1992 to cover all sections of the newly created Referendum Act.

== Duties and powers ==
Under the Canada Elections Act the Commissioner is mandated to investigate any complaint of a violation of the Act, including referrals from Elections Canada, or a complaint from the public.

=== Information-gathering powers ===
The Commissioner is granted powers from the act to carry out his duties. These include the power to petition a court to issue a search warrant or production order for documents as required for to complete an investigation. The Commissioner may also petition a court to compel a witness to testify under oath.

=== Enforcement powers ===
If it has been determined that a person or group has violated the act, the Commissioner has powers under the Act to enforce provisions of the act. These power include:

- the acceptance, by the Commissioner, of an undertaking;
- the issuance of a notice of violation requiring the payment of an administrative monetary penalty assessed by the Commissioner;
- the seeking of a court injunction;
- the seeking of a court order for the judicial deregistration of a political party
- the negotiation of a compliance agreement; and
- the laying of charges leading to a prosecution by the Director of Public Prosecutions.
