= Jean-Pierre Kingsley =

Canadian civil servant and businessman

Jean-Pierre Kingsley CM

5th chief electoral officer of Canada
- In office 1990–2007
- Preceded by: Jean-Marc Hamel
- Succeeded by: Marc Mayrand

Personal details
- Born: July 12, 1943 (age 82) Ottawa, Ontario, Canada
- Occupation: Civil servant
- Profession: Chief electoral officer

Jean-Pierre Kingsley (born July 12, 1943) is a Canadian civil servant and businessman who served as the president and CEO of the International Foundation for Electoral Systems (IFES). He was the chief electoral officer of Elections Canada before he stepped down in December 2006. On April 28, 2009, he announced his resignation as president of IFES. He was succeeded by Bill Sweeney.

== Early life and career ==
He was born in Ottawa in 1943. He was educated at the Académie De La Salle and went on to earn a BCom and a master's degree in Hospital Administration from the University of Ottawa. Kingsley was named chief electoral officer in February 1990 by Prime Minister Brian Mulroney. Prior to serving in that position, he served as:

- District manager for Travelers Insurance (1966–7)
- Head of hospital administration at the Department of Veteran Affairs (1967–71)
- Associate and then executive director of Edmonton's Charles Camsell Hospital (1971–3)
- President and chief executive officer of the Ottawa General Hospital (1977–81)

He also served as chairman of the board for Ottawa's Montfort Hospital from 1982 to 1990.

== Late career ==
He served as head of the international team observing the Iraqi legislative election in January, 2005

On December 28, 2006, Prime Minister Stephen Harper announced that Kingsley would step down effective February 17, 2007. His successor as chief electoral officer was Marc Mayrand. Prior to his resignation, Kingsley and the ruling Conservative party disagreed over whether fees paid to attend political conventions should be counted as political donations.

In 2007, Kingsley was awarded the Mexican Order of the Aztec Eagle, the highest award the Mexican government bestows on foreign nationals.

In November 2011, he observed the elections in Saint Lucia, as part of a Commonwealth assessment team constituted by the Commonwealth secretary-general.

As of November 2020, Kingsley serves as the chairman of the Executive Advisory Committee for Dominion Voting Systems.

In 2024, he was appointed as a member of the Order of Canada. He lives in Ottawa.

Government offices
Preceded by Jean-Marc Hamel	Chief Electoral Officer; 1990-2007	Succeeded by Marc Mayrand
