= Stéphane Perrault =

Canadian civil servant

Chief Electoral Officer of Canada
- Incumbent
- Assumed office June 8, 2018
- Preceded by: Marc Mayrand
- Acting; December 2016 – June 2018
- Preceded by: Marc Mayrand
- Succeeded by: himself as permanent chief electoral officer

Personal details
- Born: Montreal, Quebec, Canada
- Education: Université de Montréal
- Occupation: Civil servant

Stéphane Perrault is a Canadian civil servant, who has been the Chief Electoral Officer of Canada since 2018, previously serving in an acting capacity from 2016–2018.

== Career ==
Perrault started his law career clerking for Supreme Court justice Claire L'Heureux-Dubé.

Perrault began his public sector career in 1998 as a Counsel with Justice Canada.

In 2007, Perrault joined Elections Canada. In December 2016, following the resignation of Marc Mayrand, Perrault was appointed Acting Chief Electoral Officer.
