= Elections Canada =

Canadian federal agency in charge of elections and referendums

- Élections Canada

Agency overview
- Formed: July 1, 1920
- Jurisdiction: Canada (federal)
- Headquarters: 30, rue Victoria Gatineau, Quebec K1A 0M6
- Employees: 500 (Permanent) up to 235,000 (election period)
- Annual budget: $628,864,260 (2021–22)
- Agency executive: Stéphane Perrault, Chief Electoral Officer of Canada
- Website: www.elections.ca

Elections Canada (French: Élections Canada) is the non-partisan agency responsible for administering Canadian federal elections and referendums. (Note: Legally, Elections Canada is a name under which the Office of the Chief Electoral Officer of Canada (French: Bureau du directeur général des élections du Canada) conducts electoral administration and oversight of political funding. Elections Canada itself is not a legal entity – the chief electoral officer exercises most powers or delegates them to staff of the office, and the commissioner of Canada elections exercises others.)

== History ==
Elections Canada is an agency of the Parliament of Canada, and reports directly to Parliament rather than to the Government of Canada. The agency was created under the government of Jean Chrétien by the Canada Elections Act on 31 May 2000.

== Responsibilities ==
Elections Canada is responsible for:

- Making sure that all voters have access to the electoral system
- Informing citizens about the electoral system
- Maintaining the National Register of Electors and International Register of Electors
- Enforcing electoral legislation
- Training election officers
- Producing maps of electoral districts
- Registering political parties, electoral district associations, and third parties that engage in election advertising
- Administering the allowances paid to registered political parties
- Monitoring election spending by candidates, political parties and third parties
- Publishing financial information on political parties, electoral district associations, candidates, nomination contestants, leadership contestants and third parties
- Supporting the independent commissions responsible for adjusting the boundaries of federal electoral districts every ten years
- Reporting to Parliament on the administration of elections and referendums

== Appointments and staff ==
The House of Commons of Canada appoints the chief electoral officer to head the agency. The chief electoral officer also appoints the commissioner of Canada elections (French: Commissaire aux élections fédérales), who ensures that the Canada Elections Act is enforced. The broadcasting arbitrator (French: Arbitre en matière de radiodiffusion), who allocates paid and free broadcasting time during electoral events, is appointed by a unanimous decision of registered political parties in the House of Commons, or by the chief electoral officer if the parties fail to agree a candidate. The chief electoral officer is seconded by the deputy chief electoral officers, chief legal counsel and around 500 to 600 staff, mainly situated in the National Capital Region. During a general election or referendum, this rises to 235,000 workers.

== Compliance, enforcement and regulation ==
The Commissioner of Canada Elections is responsible for regulating federal electoral events and enforcing compliance with the Canada Elections Act.

Before 2018, the commissioner was appointed in consultation with the director of public prosecutions and was overseen by the director, but has since become part of the Office of the Chief Electoral Officer.

In November 2026, Elections Canada Chief Electoral Officer Stéphane Perrault testified before the federal Procedure and House Affairs Committee, warning that AI is making it harder for voters to get accurate information.

== See also ==
- Federal political financing in Canada
- List of federal political parties in Canada
- In and Out scandal
- Robocall scandal
