= Chief Electoral Officer of Canada =

Canadian federal election supervisor

- Incumbent; Stéphane Perrault since June 8, 2018 (Acting December 2016 to June 2018)
- Elections Canada
- Appointer: Parliament of Canada
- Term length: 10 years; (as of 2014)
- Constituting instrument: Canada Elections Act
- Formation: 1920
- First holder: Oliver Mowat Biggar
- Deputy: Deputy chief electoral officers Broadcasting arbitrator

The chief electoral officer of Canada (French: Directeur général des élections du Canada) is the person responsible for the administration of elections, referendums and other aspects of the electoral system in Canada. The position was established in 1920 under the Dominion Elections Act to be the chief executive of the independent agency now known as Elections Canada.

The chief electoral officer is assisted in carrying out their mandate by the assistant chief electoral officer and the broadcasting arbitrator who ensures that the provisions of the Canada Elections Act and the Canada Referendum Act are carried out, and the Commissioner of Canada Elections who enforces the act.

Stéphane Perrault was appointed chief electoral officer for Elections Canada on June 8, 2018, after having served as acting chief electoral officer from December 2016 to June 2018. Perrault is scheduled to hold this position for a 10-year term.

Other than children under the age of 18, the chief electoral officer is the only citizen of Canada who does not have the right to vote in federal elections. According to Elections Canada, this is due to the position's "duty to uphold the principles of absolute neutrality and non-partisanship."

== List of chief electoral officers of Canada ==
- Oliver Mowat Biggar (1920–1927)
- Jules Castonguay (1927–1949)
- Nelson Jules Castonguay (1949–1966)
- Jean-Marc Hamel (1966–1990)
- Jean-Pierre Kingsley (1990–2007)
- Marc Mayrand (2007–2016)
- Stéphane Perrault acting (2016–2018) (2018–present)
