= List of political scandals in Canada =

This is a list of major political scandals in Canada.

== Federal ==
Scandal	Description	Associated parties	Year
Pacific Scandal	Allegations of bribes being taken by the government of Sir John A. Macdonald in exchange for the contract to build the Canadian Pacific Railway. The affair forced Macdonald to resign as prime minister in November 1873. (Five years later, Macdonald served as prime minister for another 13 years.)	Conservative Party	1873
King-Byng Affair	Scandal in the Department of Customs and Excise, leading to a constitutional crisis.	Liberal Party	1926
Beauharnois scandal	Allegations of the Beauharnois Light, Heat and Power Co making substantial contributions to the Liberal Party in return for permission to divert the St. Lawrence River 30 kilometres west of Montréal to generate hydroelectricity.	Liberal Party	1930–1932
Munsinger Affair	Canada's first national political sex scandal.	Progressive Conservative Party	1960s
The Fuddle duddle incident	Prime Minister Pierre Trudeau was accused of "using un-parliamentary language".	Liberal Party	1971
Harbourgate	The federal government hired a firm to dredge Hamilton Harbour. The subsequent investigation revealed that there were $300,000 in kickbacks to Ken Elliot, the Harbour Commissioner and $4M in unnecessary work. Elliot and his accountant were charged with fraud and served prison time. One of Trudeau's cabinet ministers (John Munro) tendered a resignation, but it was not accepted. He and others under investigation were ultimately exonerated.	Liberal Party	1974
Francis Fox	Newly appointed Solicitor General, Francis Fox forged the signature of his mistress' husband in order to obtain an abortion. He was forced to step down but later resumed his political career.	Liberal Party	1978
Tunagate	Tainted tuna.	Progressive Conservative Party	1985
Grant Bristow	Canadian Security Intelligence Service infiltration of Nationalist Party of Canada and covert founding of far-right groups.	Heritage Front	1990s
Somalia affair	Military scandal prompted by the beating death of a Somali teenager.	Canadian Armed Forces	1993
Airbus affair	Prime Minister Brian Mulroney was implicated in a kickback scheme to purchase Airbus planes for Air Canada.	Progressive Conservative Party	1995
APEC Inquiry	Police conduct at the annual Asia-Pacific Economic Cooperation summit in Vancouver.	Royal Canadian Mounted Police	1997
Shawinigate	An alleged conflict of interest lobbying effort by Prime Minister Jean Chrétien.	Liberal Party	1999
Sponsorship scandal	Major misuse and misdirection of funds disbursed through the Liberal government's 1990s sponsorship program. Investigated by the Gomery Commission.	Liberal Party	2004
The "Grewal tapes"	Allegations that the Liberal Party of Canada offered Gurmant Grewal a senate seat for his wife, Nina Grewal, a cabinet post for himself, and an apology from Joe Volpe if he defected to the Liberal Party. The tapes the Conservatives relied upon, which were in possession of the party for two weeks, were found to have been crudely edited.	Liberal Party, Conservative Party	2005
In and Out scandal	Circumvention of election finance rules by the Conservatives in the 2006 election campaign.	Conservative Party	2007
Couillard Affair	Foreign Minister Maxime Bernier resigned after leaving sensitive NATO documents in the home of Julie Couillard, an ex-girlfriend who used to have links to the Hells Angels.	Conservative Party	2007
Canadian Afghan detainee issue	Parliament prorogued for the second time in a single parliament, claimed to stall an inquiry into the potential maltreatment of Afghanistan War detainees.	Conservative Party	2010
Juicegate	Conservative international development minister Bev Oda charged taxpayers for $16 orange juice, staying at a $665 per night hotel and ordering a limousine ride at a cost of $1000 per day to shuttle her 2km between the hotel and the conference venue. Oda paid back $1,353.81 after she was exposed by the media.	Conservative Party	2012
Dal Mastro Campaign Spending	In June 2012 Elections Canada was investigating Del Mastro for overspending during the 2008 elections. The investigation surrounds a payment of $21,000 made by a personal cheque to Ottawa-based polling firm Hollinshed Research Group for which Del Mastro was not reimbursed, exceeding his personal spending limit of $5,000. Del Mastro has insisted he has not broken any election law and claimed that the $21,000 cheque was for a riding-mapping software called GeoVote that Holienshed intended to launch, and not for telephone calls to constituents during the campaign. Del Mastro was convicted in 2014 and sentenced to a month in jail, four months' house arrest, and 18 months' probation. He was also banned from holding any public office while serving his conditional sentence, and from running federally for a period of five years.	Conservative Party	2014
Robocall scandal	Allegations of widespread voter fraud occurring during the 2011 Canadian federal election. Deceptive robotic and live calls were made to voters in multiple ridings, in contravention of Elections Canada rules.	Conservative Party, Dean Del Mastro	2012
ETS scandal	Alleged wrongdoing by Canadian government officials in the award of a $400-million information technology services contract.	Conservative Party	2000s
Strippergate	Conflict of interest allegations caused immigration minister Judy Sgro to resign. She was later partially cleared by the ethics commissioner.	Liberal Party	2004/2005
F-35 scandal	Involved misleading costs of F-35 fighter jets to replace former CF-18s. Prime Minister Stephen Harper was found to be in contempt of parliament for refusing to share information on the procurement.	Conservative Party	2012
CFIA scandal	Controversy surrounding Canadian Food Inspection Agency being insufficient after budget cuts and the temporary closure of XL Foods, due to a widespread E. coli outbreak in Alberta.	Canadian Food Inspection Agency	2012
Canadian Senate expenses scandal	An investigation concerning the expense claims of certain Canadian senators. Senators Mike Duffy, Mac Harb, Pamela Wallin, Patrick Brazeau and others claimed travel and housing expenses from the Senate for which they were not eligible. Prime Minister Harper became embroiled in the scandal after it was revealed that one of his aids, Nigel Wright, personally gave Senator Duffy $90,000 to pay back what he owed.	Senate of Canada, Conservative Party	2012
Illegal Donations	Conservative MP Peter Penashue resigned his seat after overspending his campaign limit and accepting corporate donations to his campaign. Penashue later claimed this was done in error by volunteer staff member Reg Bowers. Bowers (who had been appointed to the Canada-Newfoundland and Labrador Offshore Petroleum Board by the Harper government shortly after the election) also resigned his seat on the board.	Conservative Party	2013
Nadon Appointment	Despite rules indicating his ineligibility, Prime Minister Stephen Harper appointed former Judge Marc Nadon to the supreme Court of Canada. This appointment (as well as modifications to allow for his eligibility) were soundly rejected by the Supreme Court 6-1. Prime Minister then accused Chief Justice Beverley McLachlin of making inappropriate lobbying calls to his office, a claim denied by the Chief Justice who claims to have never attempted to reach the Prime Minister but only the Justice Minister Peter Mackay.	Stephen Harper	2014
Phoenix pay system	Due to procurement mismanagement, lack of sufficient testing before rollout and terminating HR employees before transition was completed, a new payroll system that was supposed to save $78 million a year ended up costing more than $2.2 billion to fix and causing payroll issues to hundreds of thousands of federal government employees.	Conservative Party, Liberal Party	2015-2016
Elbowgate	On May 18, 2016, Prime Minister Justin Trudeau came into physical contact with two opposition MPs in the House of Commons during a parliamentary session on the final reading of Bill C-14. During the incident, Trudeau grabbed Conservative MP Gord Brown by the arm and then inadvertently elbowed New Democratic MP Ruth Ellen Brosseau in the chest. Trudeau subsequently apologized and was not subject to parliamentary sanctions for the incident.	Justin Trudeau	2016
Trudeau cash-for-access scandal	Reports of Trudeau attending cash-for-access events at the homes of wealthy Chinese-Canadians.	Justin Trudeau	2016
Aga Khan scandal	Prime Minister Justin Trudeau was found to have broken four provisions of the Conflict of Interest Act by accepting a 2016 Christmas vacation on the Aga Khan's private island. The ruling made Trudeau the first prime minister in Canadian history to break federal ethics rules.	Justin Trudeau	2017
Cultural appropriation	During a February 2018 visit to India, Justin Trudeau and his family were regularly photographed donning traditional Indian garb. Outlook India, one of the country's most popular English-language news magazines, headlined an article "Trudeau Family’s Attire Too Flashy Even For An Indian?" Various Canadian and international media criticized the prime minister.	Justin Trudeau	2018
Trudeau Grope Gate	In 2018, an allegation resurfaced that Justin Trudeau, before becoming prime minister, had inappropriately touched a female reporter at a music festival in 2000. Trudeau acknowledged the incident but remembered it differently, stating he did not feel he acted inappropriately but apologized if the reporter felt otherwise. The situation sparked discussions on perceptions and standards of behavior, especially for public figures.	Justin Trudeau	2018
SNC-Lavalin affair	Conflict of Interest and Ethics Commissioner Mario Dion investigation into the allegation that the Prime Minister's Office interfered with the Justice Department's probe of Quebec construction giant SNC-Lavalin by pressuring former attorney general Jody Wilson-Raybould to consider a deferred prosecution agreement. Wilson-Raybould, who was then the Minister of Veterans Affairs, resigned from Justin Trudeau's cabinet. Gerald Butts, the Principal Secretary, categorically denied the accusation and resigned. Jane Philpott resigned as President of the Treasury Board in protest. The Ethics Commissioner ruled in August 2019 that the Prime Minister's team had breached ethics rules and that Trudeau and his officials had tried in 2018 to undermine a decision by federal prosecutors.	Liberal Party	2019
2016 SNC Lavalin election donation	On 30 April 2019, it surfaced that SNC-Lavalin made illegal donations to the federal Liberal Party for a period of 5 years ending in 2009. The Liberals received the information in 2016 and did not make it public for 3 years. Employees made contributions totalling over $110,000 to the party which were later reimbursed by the company, actions which were prohibited. For this 1 executive was charged and a compliance agreement was signed with the company to not break the rules again in the future.	Liberal Party	2019
Blackface Scandal	On 18 September 2019, during the federal election, images were published in Time magazine of Prime Minister Justin Trudeau wearing brownface makeup from his time as a teacher at West Point Grey Academy. A total of three images and one video surfaced of three different events when Trudeau wore racist makeup. Trudeau has faced questions since about how his past actions reflect on his ability to lead the country on the issue of racism.	Justin Trudeau	2019
Sole Source Contracts	During an ethics committee meeting on February 10, 2023, International Trade and Small Business Minister Mary Ng faced scrutiny over her decision to award contracts to Amanda Alvaro, a communications professional and Power & Politics panelist, for media training and public relations work. This decision, involving contracts worth $16,950, was criticized by opposition MPs as a breach of federal conflict of interest laws, damaging trust in the government. Ng, who was reprimanded by the ethics commissioner for not recusing herself from the contracting process, justified her actions by stating the need for additional communications support at the start of the COVID-19 pandemic in 2020 to manage an increased volume of media requests while distributing federal support to small businesses.	Mary Ng	2020
WE Charity controversy	Prime Minister Justin Trudeau announced on 25 June 2020 that the government had chosen WE Charity to run the long-promised $912 million Canada Student Service Grant. Following complaints by opposition parties that the Trudeau family had ties to WE Charity, the Ethics Commissioner on 3 July 2020 announced an investigation into Trudeau's and the government's decision to have the charity administer the program. Because of the complaints, WE and the federal government decided to "part ways" leaving administration of the grant program to the federal government. At a press conference on 13 July 2020, Trudeau apologized for not recusing himself from cabinet discussions of the program. Ethics Commissioner Mario Dion's report confirmed Trudeau's assertion that Canada's civil service had recommended WE Charity to manage the Canada Student Service Grant program. The report exonerated Trudeau, but also found that finance minister Bill Morneau had "given WE preferential treatment by permitting his ministerial staff to disproportionately assist it when it sought federal funding.”	Justin Trudeau, Bill Morneau	2020
ArriveCAN app	Canada's ArriveCAN app was developed and introduced in April 2020 as a COVID-19 screening and communication tool requiring travelers entering Canada to upload their contact information, travel information and quarantine plans. The app was initially developed as a joint effort between the Canadian Border Services Agency (CBSA) and the Public Health Agency of Canada (PHAC) for $80,000. The app became mandatory to use for all travelers entering Canada in November 2020 and after a new version was launched in July 2021 its use was kept a compulsory public health screening requirement for all travelers entering Canada until October 1, 2022. There has been much scrutiny over how much this app cost to develop and who was subcontracted for its development. Contracts show that the federal government will spend close to $54 million with 23 separate subcontractors. A Parliamentary committee ordered federal departments to submit contracting documents related to the app but have been told that the names of subcontractors cannot be released citing issues of confidentiality. In July 2022 a glitch in the app erroneously instructed more than 10,000 travelers to quarantine. Over the Canadian Thanksgiving weekend (October 8 – 10, 2022) developers at two separate IT companies each developed duplicates of the ArriveCAN app in less than 2 days for an estimated cost of $250,000. On November 2, 2022, a motion was passed calling on the Auditor General of Canada to "conduct a performance audit, including the payments, contracts and sub-contracts for all aspects of the ArriveCan app, and to prioritize this investigation." This was the second such motion to pass.	Liberal Party, Marco Medicino, Bill Blair, Jean Yves Duclois	2022
Sister In-Law Ethic Commissioner	In 19 April 2023, Martine Richard, initially appointed as the interim ethics commissioner of Canada, resigned due to concerns over her familial ties to Dominic LeBlanc, the Intergovernmental Affairs Minister. Richard's appointment was criticized for potential conflicts of interest given her relationship to a cabinet minister. She had been part of the ethics commissioner's office since 2013, serving in a senior role before her brief tenure as interim commissioner was cut short by her resignation amid these concerns.	Martine Richard, Dominic LeBlanc	2023
Chinese government interference in the 2019 and 2021 Canadian federal elections	In late 2022, various media outlets around the world reported on a suspected attempt by the People's Republic of China to infiltrate the Parliament of Canada by funding a network of candidates, in majority liberals members, to run in the country’s 2019 federal election.	Government of China, CSIS, Liberal Party, Justin Trudeau, Han Dong, Vincent Ke, Conservative Party	2023
Yaroslav Hunka scandal	On September 22, 2023, during the visit of Ukrainian president Volodymyr Zelenskyy to the Parliament of Canada, Waffen-SS veteran Yaroslav Hunka was thanked for his service in the SS Division Galicia by Speaker Anthony Rota and praised as a Canadian and Ukrainian hero for fighting Russians. He received a standing ovation from House members, Justin Trudeau, Ukrainian president Volodymyr Zelenskyy and Germany's ambassador to Canada Sabine Anne Sparwasser.	House of Commons, Justin Trudeau, Anthony Rota, Volodymyr Zelenskyy, Sabine Anne Sparwasser	2023

== Alberta ==
- Alberta and Great Waterways Railway scandal — a 1910 scandal that resulted in the resignation of the premier, Alexander Cameron Rutherford
- The Liberal Government over-spending on telephone poles and other unneeded expenses prior to its forced departure from power in 1921
- Sexual Sterilization Act of Alberta — a 1928 law that, over a period of four decades, resulted in close to 3,000 young people being classified as "mentally unfit" and without their knowledge or consent were sterilized to prevent them from breeding their "bad blood."
- John Brownlee sex scandal — John Edward Brownlee, Premier of Alberta, sued for the seduction of a young woman and found guilty (1935) forcing his resignation
- Dar Heatherington — forced to resign from Lethbridge City Council in 2004 after being convicted of public mischief.
- Alison Redford's expense scandal — forced to resign Premiership in 2014 after multiple expense scandals came to light
- Kamikaze campaign scandal — an investigation into allegations that Jason Kenney orchestrating Jeff Callaway's campaign for the leadership of the United Conservative Party in an attempt to harm Kenney's biggest rival, Brian Jean.
- CorruptCare scandal — allegations that the government of Danielle Smith fired Athana Mentzelopoulos, the CEO of Alberta Health Services, after she launched an internal investigation into whether government officials inflated procurement practices between AHS and companies owned by Sam Mraiche, such as MHCare.

== British Columbia ==
- Sommers Affair (British Columbia Social Credit Party) — influence peddling and abuse of privilege on timber licenses by Forest Minister
- Gracie's Finger (Social Credit Party) — gerrymandering in Vancouver-Little Mountain
- Lillooet Cattle Trail — cost overruns, poor design and other scandalous aspects on most expensive provincial infrastructure project in the 19th century
- Fantasy Gardens (Social Credit Party) — improper sale of property and influence-peddling by Premier Bill Vander Zalm, in connection with Asian gambling lord Tan Yu
- Stephen Rogers (Social Credit Party) — resigned as environment minister after a conflict of interest due to owning shares in a company
- Cliff Michael (Social Credit Party) — resigned from cabinet due to conflict of interest over the sale of some land
- Reid Affair (Social Credit Party) — Bill Reid forced to resign after a report showed that he was diverting lottery funds into a company owned by his former campaign manager
- Bud Smith (Social Credit Party) — resigned after tapes and transcripts of him talking disparagingly about a lawyer hired by the opposition NDP to investigate the Reid Affair.
- Robin Blencoe (New Democratic Party of British Columbia) — allegations of harassing an office employee.
- Phil Gaglardi (Social Credit Party) — improper use of expenses
- British Columbia Resources Investment Corporation (BCRIC or "Brick") (BC Social Credit Party) — public boondoggle involving publicly distributed and soon-worthless shares of the former Crown Corporation
- Bingogate (NDP), 1990s — former MLA and MP David Stupich used money that was raised by a charity bingo to fund the Party. Mike Harcourt resigned as premier in February 1996 as result.
- Doman Scandal (Social Credit Party) — insider trading; Premier Bill Bennett and his brother Russell James Bennett had trading sanctions imposed against them and Harbanse Singh Doman, and were ordered to pay the British Columbia Securities Commission $1 million to cover the costs of an insider trading case that spanned 11 years
- Coquihalla Highway (Social Credit Party) — cost overruns and graft
- Casinogate (NDP) — Premier Glen Clark was charged but acquitted of breach of trust in connection with his official duties. Collusion between Global television and the RCMP in trying to incriminate Clark is alleged by many commentators. Dimitros Pilarinos was convicted of providing a benefit to the Premier, and the BC Conflict of Interest Commissioner concluded "Receipt of such a benefit left Mr. Clark, albeit perhaps unwillingly, indebted to Mr. Pilarinos and meant that he might properly be considered to have an interest in seeing Mr. Pilarinos compensated in some way."
- FastCat Fiasco (aka "Ferrygate" or simply "the Fast Ferries"), 1990s — construction of a fleet of high speed ferry vessels that ended up being massively over-budget and actually slower than existing ferries
- Wilson–Tyabji Affair (British Columbia Liberal Party) — semi-secret romance between Opposition Leader Gordon Wilson and his House Whip Judy Tyabji leads to their downfall
- BC Legislature Raids ("Railgate") (Liberals) — raids on offices of senior political aides in the legislature connected to everything from marijuana grow-ops to allegations of influence peddling and money laundering in the sale of BC Rail to Canadian National.
- BC Premier arrested in Hawaii for DUI (Liberals), 2003 — BC Premier Gordon Campbell was arrested and pleaded no contest for driving under the influence of alcohol while vacationing in Hawaii. Campbell was also implicated in Railgate (see previous).
- 2012–2013: Misfire Scandal: Under the leadership of Margaret MacDiarmid, BC Liberal Minister, Ministry of Health fires a number of employees and contractors on false pretences in what was dubbed the biggest Human Resources scandal in the history of British Columbia. The Ombudsperson investigated the matter and found that the BC Health Ministry, under the leadership of Margaret MacDiarmid, committed a number of wrongdoings. The case resulted in financial compensations, government apology and an endowment educational funding by the BC Government in memory of a worker who committed suicide after false accusations were laid against him, and led to his dismissal.
- Quick Wins ethnic outreach scandal (Liberals), 2013 — resignation of Minister John Yap and Deputy Chief of Staff for Premier Christy Clark due to use of public servants' time and resources for partisan purposes.
- Triple-Delete scandal (Liberals) — In May 2015, it was revealed that over a dozen government emails relating to the RCMP investigation about the Highway of Tears were deleted by government staff following a freedom of information request. This was in violation of BC's freedom of information act.
- CleanBC grants scandal (NDP) — In April 2024, an investigation was initiated by the Minister of Energy, Mines and Low Carbon Innovation, Josie Osborne, into MNP LLP's administration of two grant programs funded through the provincial carbon tax. The allegation was that one of MNP's teams working in the province acted in the capacity as both the administrator and grant application consultant on the CleanBC grant program.

== Manitoba ==
- Legislature scandal (Conservatives), 1915 — the construction of the Manitoba Legislative Building came with allegations of materials being stolen and over-expenditure of public funds by the Manitoba Conservatives. The scandal led to a royal commission investigating the building's construction, subsequently bring on the resignation of Premier Rodmond Roblin.
- Vote-rigging scandal (Conservatives), 1998 — Premier Gary Filmon and the Conservative Party of Manitoba were accused of attempting, during the 1995 Manitoba election, to siphon off votes from the NDP by paying independent Aboriginal candidates, Independent Native Voice, to run in areas with high numbers of Aboriginal voters. This story ultimately surfaced in 1998. Several of Filmon's staff were implicated, though Filmon himself was not. Implicated in the scheme were: Taras Sokolyk, Filmon's chief of staff, who admitted to using $4,000 in party funds for it; Allan Aitken, a campaign manager who passed the money to 3 independent candidates; and Gordon McFarlane and Julian Benson, who helped cover up the plan. Independent Native Voice was established in 1995, but ceased to exist after that year. Filmon resigned as Conservative leader in 2000.

== New Brunswick ==
- Karl Toft — serial pedophile molested over 200 boys while an employee in charge at the government run New Brunswick Training School between the mid-1960s and the mid-1980s
- Hatfield weed bust, 1984 — Richard Hatfield, the premier of New Brunswick, was charged with possession of marijuana.
- Progressive Conservative Party of New Brunswick internal division, 2023–2024 — In early 2023, the provincial government led by Blaine Higgs placed Policy 713, an LGBTQ-related education policy, under review and later modified it. The controversial review and subsequent modification was largely criticized by opposing parties and organizations and received national media attention, leading to internal division within the Progressive Conservative Party of New Brunswick, with several elected Progressive Conservative politicians either resigning or not seeking re-election in 2024.

== Newfoundland and Labrador ==
- A 1969 agreement by Premier Joey Smallwood locking Newfoundland into selling electricity from the power dam at Labrador's Churchill Falls to Quebec until the year 2041—at a fixed rate that is now roughly one-tenth of the market price.
- Mount Cashel sex abuse scandal — Canada's largest sexual abuse scandal was disclosed in 1989, resulting in the closure of the facility in 1990.
- Davis Inlet, 1992/1993 — In 1992, 6 unattended children, aged between 6 months and 9 years, died in a house fire while their parents were drinking at a Valentine's Day dance. In 1993, a video was released to the media of six children in Davis Inlet between the ages of 11 and 14 huffing gasoline in an unheated shack in winter and shouting that they wanted to die. Shamed by the negative publicity and international outcry surrounding the events in 1993, the Canadian government agreed to move the Innu to Natuashish.
- Cameron Inquiry — In May 2005, Eastern Health discovered errors in hormone receptor breast cancer test results from a histology lab in St. John's. After retesting, Eastern Health concluded that 386 patients had received erroneous results between 1997 and 2005. The provincial government then called a judicial inquiry, between November 2007 and October 2008, into Eastern Health's actions. A $17.5 million settlement was reached in 2009.
- Humber Valley Paving scandal — Humber Valley Paving requests the termination of a $19M paving contract in Labrador. The request to cancel the contract is granted. HVP gets paid $12M for road preparations and paving, despite only completing 20 km out of the 80 km that was required. HVP have both their $9.5M performance bond and $9.5M labor/materials bond returned without any penalty. Transportation and Works Minister Nick McGrath resigns over the scandal.
- Muskrat Falls hydroelectric project cost overruns — The cost of the Muskrat Falls dam doubled to more than $12.7 billion since it was sanctioned in 2012. The provincial government called a public inquiry which took place between 2018 and 2020. In the inquiry report Commissioner Richard LeBlanc concluded the government failed its duty to residents by predetermining that the megaproject would proceed no matter what. In his report, LeBlanc concluded that the business case, which assumed the Muskrat Falls project was the lowest-cost power option, was “questionable.” He stated that the project's economics were not sufficiently tested and that Nalcor failed to consider all potentially viable power options. LeBlanc stated that Nalcor concealed information that could have undermined the business case for the project from the public and government.
- Carla Foote scandal, 2019 — On 5 December 2019, the House of Assembly voted to reprimand TCII Minister Chris Mitchelmore for his hiring of Carla Foote, daughter of Judy Foote, at The Rooms despite her lack of qualifications and her political connections to the Liberals. The House of Assembly ordered that Mitchelmore apologize to the Board of Directors of The Rooms, to the House of Assembly, and also be suspended two-week without pay.
- Jim Dinn unparliamentary language, 2023 — On October 20 2023 NDP Leader Jim Dinn received a citation from the Speaker of the House of Assembly following an accusation he made to Liberal Minister of Children, Seniors, and Social Development Paul Pike of "lying" and was suspended from speaking in the House of Assembly for using "unparliamentary language" for the use of the word "lying" in reference to statements made by Minister Pike on completed affordable homes. Minister Pike had claimed that 750 affordable homes were built in Newfoundland and Labrador, when, only 11 were actually completed. Dinn had refused to retract his comments and as part of his citation, was not allowed to speak during Question Period until March 2024.

== Nova Scotia ==
- Thornhill Affair — involved Roland Thornhill, who resigned as Deputy Premier in the 1990s after allegations dealing with a debt settlement from 1980 was brought into question.
- Billy Joe MacLean Affair (The BJM Affair) — MLA Billy Joe MacLean was expelled from the Assembly after Premier John Buchanan's Progressive Conservative government introduced legislation prohibiting anyone from sitting in the assembly who had been convicted of an indictable offence punishable by imprisonment for more than five years. MacLean pleaded guilty to four counts of submitting forged documents—went to the Supreme Court of Nova Scotia, which upheld Macleans expulsion, but declared the law that prohibited him from running as a candidate to be unconstitutional—MacLean was re-elected in a by-election in 1987. He was subsequently defeated in the 1988 general election by Danny Graham (Liberal).
- Buchanan patronage scandals, 1990 — Michael Zareski, a former Deputy Minister, testified against Premier John Buchanan's government in June 1990 of pervasive patronage within his government. One of the many scandals included an order of 200 special machines that dispensed disposable plastic toilet-seat covers that never ended up being used.
- Westray Mine — Dangerous practices by mining companies resulted in the death of 26 miners.

== Nunavut ==
- David Joanasie DUI — In 2014, Joanasie was arrested for impaired driving after going wrong direction in a one-way street and fled from police in Charlottetown, Prince Edward Island. He pleaded guilty and was fined $1700, ordered to donate $500 to a Nunavut charity and given a one-year driving suspension.

== Ontario ==
- Ontario Bond Scandal (United Farmers of Ontario), early 1920s
- Patti Starr scandal — illegal use of charitable funds in the late 1980s for political campaigns donations.
- Ipperwash Crisis — incident involving the shooting death of Dudley George, an unarmed Native activist, by an Ontario Provincial Police officer in 1995 which led to the Ipperwash Inquiry
- Kimberly Rogers — After a welfare fraud conviction, Rogers committed suicide in her Sudbury apartment while under house arrest in 2001, leading to extensive controversy around the Mike Harris government's 1996 welfare reforms, as well as an inquest which made several still-unimplemented recommendations for changes to the system.
- Toronto Computer Leasing Inquiry, 1999 — judicial inquiry into improper computer leasing contracts made by Toronto's municipal government
- Walkerton water scandal, 2000
- Hells Angels in Toronto, 2002 — Hells Angels come to Toronto and are welcomed by Mayor Mel Lastman.
- Toronto Police drug scandal, 2004 — multiple scandals broke out in early 2004, as a result of internal affairs and RCMP investigations. Allegations of the sale of narcotics, fake search warrants, raid tip-offs and mob gambling debts involved many dozens of Toronto police officers, including former chief William J. McCormack's son, Michael, who was eventually brought up on 23 charges. As a result of the scandal, the plainclothes downtown unit which many of the charged officers worked out of was disbanded. The court cases relating to these charges continue.
- ORNGE scandal, 2011 — Ornge was involved in a controversy regarding executives compensation, including President and CEO Chris Mazza. Mazza went on an indefinite medical leave on 22 December 2011 at the height of the scandal. The Toronto Star uncovered that Mazza was receiving $1.4 million a year while remaining off the sunshine list of public employees earning over $100,000. That salary made him the highest publicly paid official in the province. Ontario Health Minister Deb Matthews stated that Mazza's salary was "outrageous, shocking and unacceptable". Ornge Global, Ornge's for-profit division, also received $6.7 million in a contract from Anglo-Italian helicopter manufacturer AgustaWestland, which is also part of the audit by the provincial auditor general. On 16 February 2012 Ornge formally became the subject of an Ontario Provincial Police investigation for "financial irregularities".
- Ontario power plant scandal — In 2011, plans to construct a gas-fired power plant in an environmentally sensitive area of Mississauga had some residents up in arms. After weeks of continual protest from concerned community activists in Mississauga and Oakville, the Ontario Liberals decided to cancel the gas plants. NDP MPPs claimed the decision was not motivated by environmental concerns but rather political ones.
- Rob Ford crack video scandal, 2013 May
- Rod Phillips secret vacation — Rod Phillips, the Finance Minister of Ontario, resigned after it came to light he had been on vacation in Saint Barthélemy when the province had been in lockdown during the COVID-19 pandemic.
- Ontario Greenbelt scandal — Doug Ford's conservative government gives $8B worth of land to developer friends, removing it from environmentally protected greenbelt areas without established need for the land for housing, and with bias and lack of transparency during the selection process.
- 2024 ServiceOntario controversy — The Ford government awarded Staples and Walmart sole-sourced deals that costed the province over 26 times what they were supposed to.

== Quebec ==
- Duplessis Orphans — Maurice Duplessis' government and the Roman Catholic Church, between the 1940s through the 1960s, wrongly classified children as mentally ill.
- Charbonneau Commission — 2011–2012 inquiry into the Quebec construction industry

== Saskatchewan ==
- Expense fraud scandal — Scandal in which members of the Progressive Conservative Party of Saskatchewan defrauded the province of $837,000 between 1987 and 1991; resulted in 15 criminal convictions, including 13 caucus members. The chief conviction was that of Deputy Premier Eric Berntson in 1999.
- Thatcher murder scandal — Colin Thatcher, a member of Grant Devine's Progressive Conservative government, was convicted in 1984 for the 1983 murder of his ex-wife, JoAnn Wilson.
- Saskatchewan Potato Utility Development Company (SPUDCO) — A publicly owned potato company that was inappropriately characterized as a public-private partnership.
- GTH scandal — A land purchase that disproportionately benefited businessmen with personal ties to Saskatchewan Party MLA Bill Boyd.
