= Michael Sona =

Canadian political figure

- Occupation: Political staffer
- Known for: Conviction in the 2011 Canadian federal election robocall scandal
- Notable work: Appeared in Election Day in Canada: When Voter Suppression Came Calling (2019)
- Criminal charge: Preventing or endeavouring to prevent an elector from voting (2014)
- Criminal penalty: 9 months imprisonment; 12 months probation
- Criminal status: Paroled September 2016; sentence expired January 2017

Michael Sona is a Canadian political figure known for his involvement in the Robocall scandal, which occurred while he was employed as a Conservative campaign worker in the Guelph riding for the 2011 federal election. During the election, voters in Guelph claimed to have received robocalls, purporting to be from Elections Canada, which falsely informed them that the location of their polling stations had changed. Sona, perhaps along with others, had arranged for the calls in an attempt to suppress voters intending to vote for other political parties.

After the allegations first arose in the media, Sona appeared on CBC's Power & Politics with Evan Solomon where he denied any involvement in the scandal. During the interview, Sona claimed he had no information about who was responsible but was "not going to take the fall for something [he] didn't do".

Following investigations by Elections Canada and the Royal Canadian Mounted Police, Sona was charged with willfully preventing or endeavouring to prevent an elector from voting in an election, an offence under the Canada Elections Act. On August 14, 2014, Sona was found guilty; however, Justice Hearn noted that Sona had likely not acted alone. The Court found that Sona displayed a "callous and blatant disregard for the right of people to vote" as part of an "ill-conceived and disturbing plan". No one else has been charged or convicted in relation to this matter. Sona was the only person ever convicted of endeavouring to prevent an elector from voting. He was sentenced to nine months in prison, along with 12 months probation. The sentence was appealed, but was upheld by the Ontario Court of Appeal. He was granted parole in September 2016. The remainder of his sentence expired in January 2017.

He appeared in Election Day in Canada: When Voter Suppression Came Calling, a 2019 documentary about the scandal for which he was interviewed three times.

On January 28, 2025, Sona was charged with four counts of assault, including two counts of alleged assault by choking of a woman.
