= 2011 Canadian federal election voter suppression scandal =

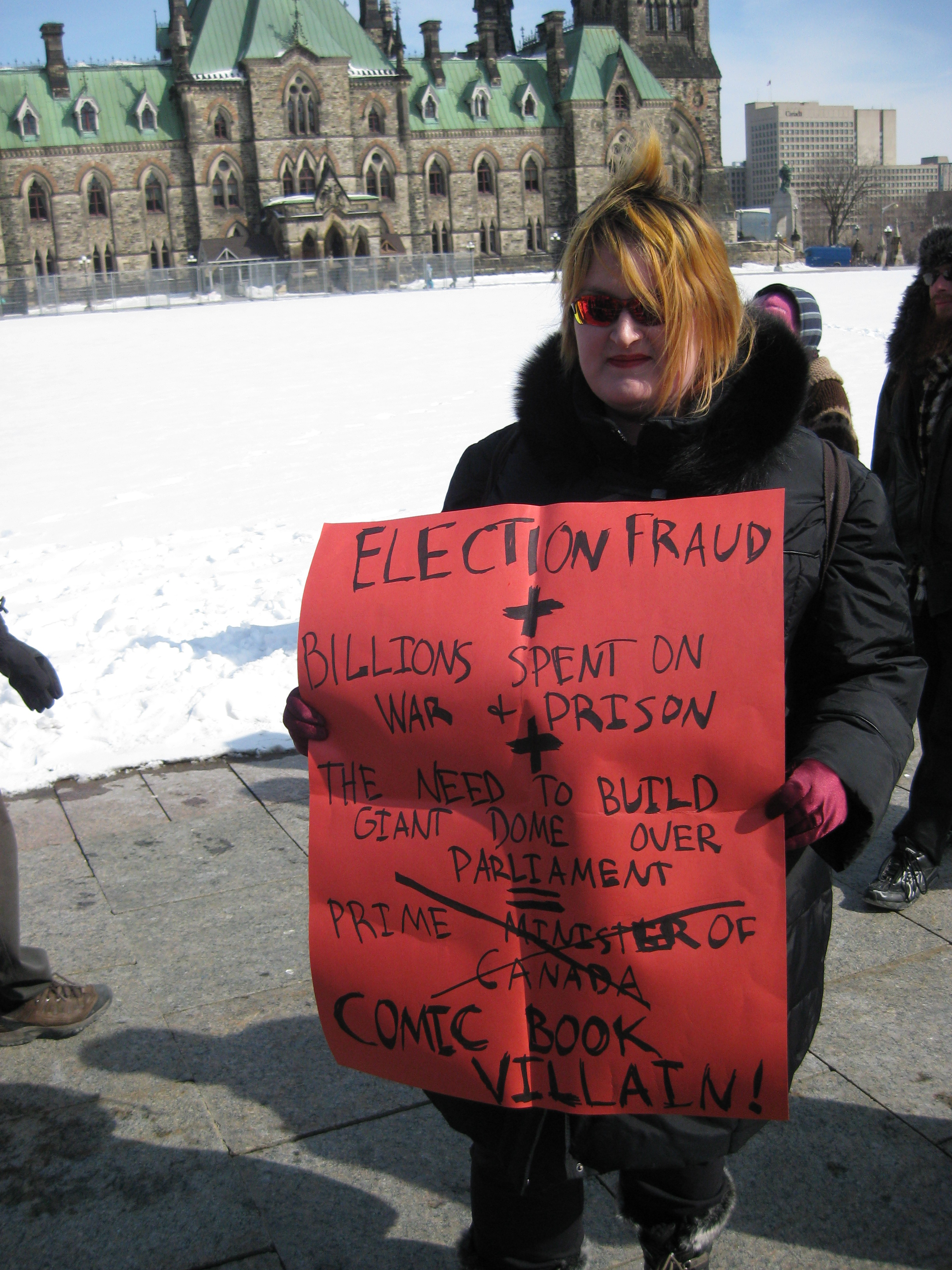
A woman protesting the robocall scandal on Parliament Hill

The 2011 Canadian federal election voter suppression scandal (also known as the Robocall scandal, Robogate, or RoboCon) is a political scandal stemming from events during the 2011 Canadian federal election. It involved robocalls and real-person calls that originated in the Conservative Party of Canada's campaign office in Guelph, Ontario. The calls were designed to result in voter suppression. Elections Canada and the Royal Canadian Mounted Police (RCMP) conducted investigations into the claims that calls were made to dissuade voters from casting ballots by falsely telling them that the location of their polling stations had changed. Further possible electoral law violations were alleged as the evidence unfolded. Under the Canada Elections Act, it is an offence to willfully prevent, or endeavour to prevent, an elector from voting in an election.

On Election Day, May 2, 2011, reports of voter suppression, mostly centred on the riding of Guelph, led to the discovery that a computer in the Guelph campaign office had possibly been used to make the calls. While the Elections Canada investigation initially focused on calls sent into Guelph amidst nationwide complaints, the investigation expanded to complaints in other Conservative Party of Canada campaign offices across the country. Court documents filed in mid-August 2012 by the Commissioner of Canada Elections indicated that the elections watchdog had received complaints of fraudulent or misleading calls in 247 of Canada's 308 ridings, recorded in all ten provinces and at least one territory. The allegations received widespread national media attention, and led to a series of protests in March and April 2012 in at least 27 Canadian cities. April 29, 2012, was termed by protest organizers a "National Day Against Election Fraud".

On April 24, 2014, Commissioner of Canada Elections Yves Cote issued a press release that stated, "the Commissioner has concluded that, following a thorough investigation by his Office, the evidence is not sufficient to provide reasonable grounds to believe that an offence was committed. Therefore, the Commissioner will not refer the matter to the Director of Public Prosecutions". However in August, 2014, former junior Conservative staffer Michael Sona was found guilty of one violation of the Elections Act.

== Voter suppression in Guelph ==
In February 2012, Postmedia News and the Ottawa Citizen reported that during the 2011 Canadian federal election, misleading phone calls were made in at least 14 ridings, including Guelph, Ontario. The calls directed voters to the wrong polling stations. The fraudulent, automated calls displayed the phone number of a prepaid "burner phone", registered to a "Pierre Poutine" of "Separatist Street" in Joliette, Quebec. In addition, "Pierre Poutine" also used the alias "Pierre Jones" of pierres1630 at gmail.com, living at the fictional address of 54 Lajoie Nord in Joliette, Quebec.

The day before election day, "Pierre Poutine" sent out a series of messages using 2call.ca, an automated call company subsidiary of Edmonton-based Internet service provider RackNine, which directed voters to the wrong voting locations. The calls were falsely displayed as originating from Liberal candidate Frank Valeriote's campaign office. A PayPal account was used to pay for the calls to RackNine, and logged Poutine's credit card information. Both RackNine and Paypal turned over activity and transaction logs to investigators.

A transcript of the false robocall in Guelph, used on election day to impersonate an Elections Canada official, reads: "This is an automated message from Elections Canada. Due to a projected increase in voter turnout, your poll location has been changed. Your new voting location is at the Old Quebec Street Mall, at 55 Wyndham Street North. Once again, your new poll location is at the Old Quebec Street Mall, at 55 Wyndham Street North. If you have any questions, please call our hotline at 1-800-443-4456. We apologize for any inconvenience this may cause. (French version recorded in another woman's voice follows.)"

Elections Canada emails were revealed under Access to Information requests, and exposed internal communications on the matter. At 11:06 am on election day, May 2, 2011, election officer Anita Hawdur sent an email to legal counsel Karen McNeil titled: "URGENT Conservative campaign office communication with electors". Hawdur reported that returning officers also called to ask about the calls. Another email was sent from legal counsel to Ronnie Molnar, the deputy Chief Electoral Officer who in turn emailed a senior director: "This one is far more serious. They have actually disrupted the voting process."

In response to the Guelph robocalls alone, 281 people called back Pierre Poutine's cellphone. A voice broadcasting expert contracted by Al Mathews of Elections Canada, estimated that at a typical one-percent call-back rate, the 281 call-backs indicated that many thousands of electors were affected, even considering that the nature of these calls would probably have resulted in a higher callback rate. An affidavit filed to secure a search warrant reported that 7,760 call attempts were made in Guelph.

=== Elections Canada investigation ===
The investigation into fraudulent calls in Guelph revealed that thousands of automated calls telling people their voting location had changed were sent shortly after 10:00 am on election day. Complaints flooded into Elections Canada, and a local returning officer called a Guelph-area radio station at 10:53 am and put out an advisory to ignore the calls. Liberal MP Frank Valeriote received a call at his home notifying him that Liberal Party of Canada supporters were being targeted. It quickly emerged that there was an extensive campaign to discourage Liberal supporters. In under an hour, 100 voters arrived at the phony voting location. A signed affidavit indicates that 150 to 200 voters in Guelph showed up at a phony vote location at the Quebec Street Mall; some voters ripped up their voter identification cards in anger. He also noted that all the voters who were targeted had previously indicated they would not vote for the Conservative Party of Canada, when they were contacted by the party. This caused the opposition parties to allege that the calls were a campaign by the Conservative Party to intimidate supporters of other parties.

After being accused by some journalists and politicians of direct involvement, and having a pre-existing business relationship with the Conservative Party, Matt Meier, CEO of RackNine, has described his company as a "non-partisan firm, free from any party affiliation, bias, or designation", that provided services to "political parties across the political spectrum". However, in March 2012, Meier allegedly made a conflicting statement that the company held an exclusive contract with the Conservative Party that precluded them working for other parties during the 2011 election, a standard requirement among all political parties.

RackNine was used legitimately by a number of Conservative candidates, including Guelph Conservative candidate Marty Burke, and Conservative leader Stephen Harper in Calgary Southwest. In November 2011, an Edmonton judge ordered RackNine to turn over all correspondence, emails and records of contact between the company and representatives of the Conservative Party general election campaign in Guelph, although Elections Canada made clear that "RackNine Inc. is not under investigation for an offence against this Act or any other Act of Parliament".

Elections Canada traced the automated calls to a disposable cellphone in the 450 area code of Joliette, Quebec, and issued a subpoena to the cellphone provider. The provider produced a list of outgoing calls from the same number. One of the calls was found to be made to RackNine; in November 2011 the investigator served RackNine with a production order for records. The account holder associated with the false calls was quickly identified. The owner of RackNine said that he had no idea what had transpired on election day until contacted by an Elections Canada investigator. Phone records show numbers connected with Guelph Conservative candidate Marty Burke and the Guelph Conservative Party riding association made a total of 31 calls to RackNine between March 26 and early May.

On March 28, 2012, Elections Canada indicated that they were closer to identifying the person behind the fraudulent robocalls in Guelph from records obtained from Rogers Communications under a production order. This followed a lead provided by RackNine who provided the IP address used both to set up and use to make the robocalls to constituents in Guelph. Elections Canada emphasized that RackNine itself was not under investigation, and the company had fully cooperated.

Investigators pointed out that whoever set up the account which sent out the fraudulent recorded messages tried hard to cover his or her electronic tracks by using a prepaid credit card to buy a prepaid cellphone, registered an account under a fake name and address, and used a different fake name and address (Pierre Poutine of Separatist Street, Joliette, Quebec) to set up the cellphone. However, the CEO of RackNine was able to trace a specific IP address associated with the calls, which belonged to a private home.

In August 2012, Elections Canada investigators indicated that they had hit a dead end in the Poutine investigation, as the IP address they were tracing resolved to a Guelph residence apparently unconnected to the investigation, although the family living there was inadvertently running an open Wi-Fi connection. The IP address assignment was later shown to have been incorrect. As a result of the lack of progress in the Guelph investigation, the RCMP was called in. Diane Benson, a spokeswoman for Elections Canada, confirmed, "The office of the Commissioner of Canada Elections has been assisted by the RCMP in its investigation in fraudulent calls in the 41st general election."

Pierre Poutine/Pierre Jones had also considered the idea of having calls made to Guelph constituents in the middle of the night, while spoofing the phone number of local Liberal party candidate Frank Valeriote. The intention was to anger and annoy the recipients of these phone calls. The message itself had been recorded but was not transmitted.

Meier also informed Elections Canada that "Pierre" had telephoned him on his "unlisted office number" and had asked to speak with him personally when initially setting up the account. Elections Canada investigator Allan Mathews said, "Pierre referred to knowing someone in the Conservative Party", and, "In Meier's view, these facts mean someone must have given Pierre his contact information".

According to court filings, Elections Canada alleged that someone connected to the Conservative party campaign in Guelph had planned to deceive non-Conservative party supporters by making misleading and harassing telephone calls, either directing voters to non-existent polling stations or by angering them by phoning them in the middle of the night.

Liberal Member of Parliament Marc Garneau requested that the Canadian Radio-television and Telecommunications Commission (CRTC), which "can investigate unsolicited calling activity without court orders", be involved in the investigation.

On May 4, 2012, a court filing by Elections Canada investigator Allan Mathews indicated that the same IP address used to create the misleading calls on RackNine's service was also used within four minutes by Conservative campaign staff member Andrew Prescott to make legitimate RackNine calls. The IP address was assigned to a computer in the campaign headquarters of Guelph Conservative candidate Marty Burke. Prescott also allegedly downloaded a list of telephone numbers from the Conservative Party's central database on April 30, the same day the Pierre Poutine account was created. Witnesses recalled that Conservative Party campaign worker Michael Sona had discussed his extensive plans for a disinformation campaign, including sending non-Conservative voters to the wrong poll locations. Both Prescott and Sona had denied any involvement in making the illegal robocalls.

In August, a more detailed analysis of Elections Canada court filings showed that Andrew Prescott and "Pierre Poutine" had used the same computer in the middle of the night of 1–2 May 2011, within minutes of each other, without signing out in between. Direct Leap Technologies CEO Simon Rowland explained the court filings: "on May 1 and 2, on three occasions Pierre Poutine logged into the RackNine web interface, logged out, and then logged into the Prescott account during the same browser session. This means Poutine logged out of his account, and then logged into the account used for the official calls without closing his browser tab. So it's not just what was reported so far — that the Poutine account and Prescott account were accessed by the same IP within 4 minutes of each other during the middle of the night. It's also that on three separate occasions, someone with both the Prescott and Poutine account passwords used the same browser window to log into both accounts. Also, Poutine logged into RackNine through the proxy, closed his browser window, and 1 minute later logged in again, but this time forgot to go to the proxy website first, accidentally accessing the site directly. There were two session records for the Poutine account 1 minute apart: the first coming from the proxy, and the second coming from the Burke Campaign's office IP at 99.225.28.34." Rowland commented that this is "pretty great evidence, as it shows that someone had both passwords".

On October 31, 2012, accused Conservative Party staff member Michael Sona, whom anonymous reports had named as responsible for the Guelph voter suppression efforts, gave an extensive media interview on CBC's Power & Politics. Sona stated that he had hoped that the Elections Canada investigation would have shown he was not involved by this point in time, but that given that there was no end in sight to the lengthy investigation, he felt he had to speak out. In the interview, Sona denied involvement and indicated that he was "not going to take responsibility for something that [he was] not responsible for". He added, "I think that there's some people that maybe had an interest in seeing me take the fall for it." During the interview, he was asked who was involved and Sona stated, "You've got to take a look at the options and just say, you know what, what is the more realistic option here? That some then-22-year-old guy managed to co-ordinate this entire massive scheme when he didn't even have access to the data to be able to do this, or the alternative — that this was much more coordinated or possibly that there were people that knew how to do this, that it was being done? ... I don't know for sure who it could have been, but I will say this. It's interesting that you had a bunch of people come out and point the finger at me, officially to Elections Canada, only after my name was leaked to the media by anonymous sources."

In November 2012, the Guelph Mercury reported that Burke's campaign manager, Ken Morgan, had moved to Kuwait, changed his email, left no phone number and refused to speak with Elections Canada.

In August 2013, court filings made by Mathews as part of Information to Obtain (ITO) court orders showed that Sona admitted his involvement in the events and suggested that others were involved as well. Mathews stated, "Sona also said in his media interviews that Elections Canada had told him in June that they had cleared him of involvement and that our investigation was completed. These last statements are wrong." Elections Canada presented evidence that at least one named voter was dissuaded from voting as a result of the deception. The case judge, Célynne Dorval, issued a temporary publication ban covering much of the content of the ITO orders, at the request of Sona's lawyer and agreed to by the Crown prosecutor, to ensure a fair trial. The filed court documents also clarify why the IP address used to set-up the RackNine calls traced to an uninvolved home address, as Rogers had incorrectly identified the holder of the IP address. It was confirmed that the correct user on the date in question was the Marty Burke campaign office. Further filed court documents indicated that the Conservative Party admitted that its CIMS database was used to create the list of non-Conservative supporters used, that five people in Guelph had accessed CIMS, and that Sona was not one of them.

The pretrial conference on August 29, 2013, resulted in the judge, Justice Norman Douglas, indicating that the case may not result in a trial, but that would be determined at the next meeting on September 25, 2013, stating, "If there needs to be a trial, we'll set the date at that time."

On January 15, 2014 it was announced that Andrew Prescott, the Conservative deputy campaign manager and IT coordinator in Guelph, had been granted immunity from prosecution in the case in exchange for his participation as a witness.

=== Conservative Party internal investigation ===
There were concerns that the Guelph robo-call user had access to the Conservative Party national voter identification database, known as "CIMS". The information from this database was used to target voters who identified themselves as voting against the Conservative Party. The CIMS database requires a secure login, and all use of the database is logged. Since the voters who were targeted had spoken (during legitimate calls) with the Conservative Party and identified themselves as non-Conservative voters, the initiator of the robocalls ("Pierre Poutine") had been one of a limited number of Conservative Party staff or volunteers who had access to the voter database. The Conservative Party did not reveal the list of people who had access to this database. The party's investigator, lawyer Arthur Hamilton, instructed party workers not to discuss the events during the Elections Canada investigation of the Conservative Party headquarters.

== Voter suppression across Canada ==
Elections Canada's investigation initially focused on complaints in Guelph, but reports of similar automated misdirection calls were received in some 200 ridings, in every province. The initial investigation was expanded with interviews in other ridings. Media reports published complaints of alleged fraudulent robocalls or harassing live calls in 100 ridings. The calls were reported from Yukon to Nipissing, Ontario. In Yukon, the election was won by only 132 votes and a number of voters were sent to a phony voting location. Four ridings were won by fewer than 1,000 votes, including Nipissing—Timiskaming, Mississauga East—Cooksville, Winnipeg South Centre and Willowdale all of which experienced robo-calls. In three of these ridings, robocalls allegedly directed voters to false voting locations and in all four ridings complaints were filed.

By March 2, Elections Canada had received 31,000 complaints related to the robocall scandal. These complaints were not necessarily all reports from voters personally affected by the robocalls, but rather voicing concern about the robocalls and their impact on Canadian democracy. On March 29, Elections Canada reported that they had received 800 actual reports from voters who alleged that they had been called and given misleading polling information. By mid-August, the number of reports had risen to 1,394 according to court documents filed by the Commissioner of Canada Elections. In the Guelph investigation alone, Elections Canada is aware of at least 7,600 robocalls directing voters to the wrong voting station, which resulted in 68 formal complaints in the midst of intense local media coverage in Guelph on Election Day.

=== Calls from live operators announcing false polling location changes ===
While the messages directed to Guelph voters using RackNine's services were automated, there were also nationwide reports of calls made using live operators in addition to other reports of fraudulent robocalls across the country. In one widely reported version, the caller identified themselves as representing Elections Canada and read a message that indicated that the voter's voting station had been moved "due to higher than anticipated voter turnout". This call was seen as suspicious by some recipients due to the fact that some of them had either already voted at their original voting station, had used the same voting station for decades, or were party staffers.

Employees of Responsive Marketing Group Inc, a call centre with live operators located in Thunder Bay and used only by the Conservative Party, stated earlier in the 2011 campaign that they had made calls to identify recipients as either Conservative supporters or Liberal/NDP supporters. Depending on their stated allegiance, the recipients later received different scripted messages, such as get-out-the-vote calls targeted at identified Conservative supporters. Some call centre workers became concerned that what they were doing was wrong and possibly illegal, and informed their supervisors and the RCMP. Their supervisors told them to stick to their script. The RCMP in Thunder Bay referred it to the RCMP in Ottawa. Cpl. Laurence Trottier referred it to Elections Canada. Elections Canada has a policy of not discussing ongoing investigations and refused to make any statements.

The legal challenge brought forward by the Council of Canadians case relies on the affidavit of Annette Desgagne, a Responsive Marketing Group call centre worker who says that she and her co-workers were given scripts to mislead voters on election day into going to the wrong location to vote. Arthur Hamilton, a lawyer representing the Conservative Party, called the affidavit "false" and stated that he would seek to have the Council of Canadians court case thrown out as "flawed" and a "publicity stunt". The lawyer served motions to have the case thrown out of court before the supporting evidence had been filed. Fred DeLorey, a Conservative Party spokesman, added about the case, "This is a transparent attempt to overturn certified election results simply because this activist group doesn't like them". Desgagne claimed that she was given scripts while working at the Responsive Marketing Group call centre. These scripts identified the calls as coming from the "Voter Outreach Centre", and told voters about false changes to voting stations.

While speaking to voters to tell them that their voting location had changed, many voters told Desgagne that they had already voted or that the voting location was over an hour from their house. Desgagne said she remembered calling someone in the contested Nipissing—Temiskaming riding because she had repeated difficulty pronouncing it – a riding with no actual poll location changes. The affidavit states that other employees noticed that the change-of-location voting information was erroneous and discussed it on their breaks. When hearing another RMG employee use a script that identified himself as from Elections Canada, Desgagne said, "Dude, you're not from Elections Canada." RMG's spokesperson said that they did not call anyone but Conservative Party supporters, and that their scripts honestly and correctly identified themselves as from the Conservative Party. RMG further insisted that they made no change-of-address calls regarding voting locations.

In August 2012, RMG CEO Andrew Langhorne filed an affidavit which called Desgagne's story "categorically false", and denied that the company even called opposition supporters in the last days of the election. He referred to a review of recordings of Desgagne's calls. However, court documents filed on November 5, 2012, showed that the Responsive Marketing Group, using scripts provided by the Conservative Party, had called voters at the end of the election campaign telling them that their polling stations had been moved when they had not been moved. The factum was filed by Steven Shrybman for the plaintiffs. On January 14, 2013, the Ottawa Citizen posted an audio recording of a robocall recorded by a voter in London, Ontario, that is being investigated by Elections Canada.

Part of the Council of Canadians case involves expert witness testimony from Bob Penner, president and CEO of Strategic Communications Inc. Penner's affidavit says: "The only plausible explanation for such calling to have occurred is for someone at the senior level in a central political campaign to have authorized the strategy and provided the data and the funds with which to carry it out."

=== Harassing calls claiming to be from the Liberal Party ===
Some reports centred on live and automated calls falsely claiming to be from the Liberal Party. Voters reported rude calls, racist calls mimicking ethnic accents, or very-early or late-night phone calls from live callers.

Jewish voters from ridings including Eglinton—Lawrence and York Centre reported receiving calls while observing the Sabbath, where the Liberal campaigns report that they did not send these calls. The campaigns explained that their campaigns are careful to respect religious observation on the Sabbath and definitely were not the source of these calls.

Falsely misrepresenting oneself as a political party is a crime under the Canada Elections Act.

=== Investigation ===
On March 15, 2012, Elections Canada indicated that it would expand its investigation in response to additional complaints received. Tim Charbonneau, an Elections Canada investigator, joined Al Mathews, a former investigator for the RCMP. Mathews had been previously involved in the investigation of Rt. Hon. Brian Mulroney over the Airbus affair, as well as Privacy Commissioner Radwanski. The Conservative Party's investigation was conducted by Arthur Hamilton, a lead lawyer for the Conservative Party, who was previously involved in the Gomery inquiry, and the Helena Guergis and Rahim Jaffer investigations.

Elections Canada followed up on at least two instances in which voters received robocalls supposedly from Elections Canada telling voters that their polling stations had been changed. In one instance, Eduardo Harari, a volunteer working on Ken Dryden's Liberal campaign in York Centre, stated that the reason he had been told in one of the calls for the polling station location change was due to the high number of people voting at his polling station. Harari also said that he had received eight bilingual fake calls from Elections Canada telling him his polling station had changed, including one on April 21 and the last on May 2. While Harari did report the calls to Elections Canada during and after the election, he was only contacted by Elections Canada after the second call. Charbonneau also interviewed Peggy Walsh Craig of Nipissing—Timiskaming, who said she had received a robocall purportedly from Elections Canada. Craig also stated that she received voter-identification calls earlier in the campaign ostensibly from someone representing the Conservative Party. Harari also reported having received a similar voter identification call from someone claiming to be from the Conservative party. Both Harari and Craig had indicated they would not be voting Conservative.

Further investigation by the Canadian Broadcasting Corporation (CBC) seemed to reveal a similar pattern to that experienced by Harari and Craig. Mark Mayrand, the chief electoral officer, indicated that he had received over 700 calls from Canadians who claimed to have received deceptive calls purportedly from Elections Canada. Specifically, a pattern was identified in which voters who had previously received phone calls from someone allegedly from the Conservative party and who had indicated that they would not be voting Conservative, subsequently received a robocall directing them to an incorrect polling station. Tim McCoy, in the riding of Ottawa—Vanier was one such person who had received a robocall falsely from Elections Canada but only after having received a call from someone claiming to be from the Conservative Party and asking McCoy for his support in the upcoming election. McCoy reportedly declined to pledge his support for the Conservatives. Elections Canada does not contact voters by telephone, nor does it have telephone numbers for voters.

An EKOS poll confirmed that non-Conservative voters were targeted by robocalls over Conservative voters, and voters in contested ridings were targeted over those in less contested ridings. The president of EKOS described the result as "highly statistically significant and we can say with confidence that this is not an artifact of chance." and that "These results strongly suggest that significant voter-suppression activities took place that were targeted at non-Conservative voters" The polling data indicated that the number of voters affected could have affected the election results in a number of ridings. The EKOS poll aimed to answer three questions: to what extent may voter suppression techniques have been used to influence outcomes in the seven ridings; if voter suppression activities occurred, did they deliberately target electors who were supporters of particular political parties and how effective were any suppression activities in discouraging those from casting a ballot who would otherwise have voted?

In mid-November 2012 a media Access to Information Act request resulted in the release of emails that showed that Elections Canada had already received many complaints from voters about calls directing them to the wrong polling location days before the election was actually held. Elections Canada had identified that these calls originated with the Conservative Party and had contacted the party before the election. Conservative Party officials admitted they were calling voters but denied they were misleading anyone. On the Sunday before the elections Elections Canada lawyer Michèle René de Cotret wrote that there was "some mischief purportedly done by representatives of the Conservative party calling people to tell them that the location of their polling site has been moved." In response to this new information NDP MP Charlie Angus stated, "the defence of the Conservatives is starting to crumble because now we have the information to access documents that reveal that Elections Canada was so concerned about voter fraud, it believed the Conservative Party was 'running a scam' and its investigators traced the calls back to a 1-800 number that went to the Conservative Party headquarters."

By mid-November 2012 the very slow pace of progress by Elections Canada in investigating the matter was causing concern among the Canadian public and the opposition parties. Interim Liberal leader Bob Rae said, "I don't have an explanation as to why it would be taking Elections Canada so long to indicate where it's going and how it's proceeding with this investigation. I'm increasingly hearing concerns from Canadians that Elections Canada is not moving with the kind of clarity and the kind of speed that they would expect of an organization which is intended to ensure Canadians that the electoral process in Canada is fair."

In mid-January 2013 an Ontario court released records showing that an Elections Canada Information to Obtain order served on Rogers to obtain phone records had been completed. The telephone records pertained to 45 complaints of misleading or harassing phone calls.

In mid-March 2013, after more than 21 months of investigation, Commissioner of Canada Elections Yves Côté recommended to Director of Public Prosecutions, Brian Saunders, that charges should be laid with regard to the Guelph robocalls. On 2 April 2013 Conservative campaign worker Michael Sona was charged under section 491(3)d of the Canada Elections Act for preventing or trying to prevent a voter from casting a ballot, which carries a maximum penalty of a $5,000 fine and five years in prison. In June 2013, Croft Michaelson, the federal lawyer with the Public Prosecution Service of Canada, confirmed that they were proceeding by indictment against Sona, which carries the maximum penalty.

In May 2013 Marc Mayrand, the head of Elections Canada, confirmed that witnesses who work for the Conservative Party of Canada were not cooperating with the investigation.

In April 2014 Elections Canada announced that no further charges would be laid. Yves Côté, Commissioner of Canada Elections, said in a press release, "ultimately, investigators have been able to determine that incorrect poll locations were provided to some electors, and that some nuisance calls occurred. However, the evidence does not establish that calls were made a) with the intention of preventing or attempting to prevent an elector from voting, or b) for the purpose of inducing an elector by some pretence or contrivance to vote or not vote, or to vote or not vote for a particular candidate. This proof of intent is necessary for the Commissioner to consider recommending to the Director of Public Prosecutions that a prosecution under the Act be initiated."

Lawyer Steven Shrybman, who represented the Council of Canadians in their related case, called the Elections Canada investigation "fatally flawed" and stated that it ignored key evidence presented. He charged that Côté failed "to pursue the central question to emerge about voter fraud during the Election". Shrybman said in a report he authored, "in spite of having narrowly confined his inquiry, the Commissioner draws an aggressive and overly broad conclusion that goes well beyond an acknowledgement that he was simply unable to identify the culprit or culprits behind the voter suppression calls that were widely reported...Remarkably, there is no indication that the Commissioner asked the CPC (Conservative Party of Canada) to produce the record of CIMS database use in the days leading to the Election to determine how often, and by whom, lists of non-CPC supporters were downloaded."

The Elections Canada report has been criticized for being incomplete. In Winnipeg South Centre, the riding with the second largest number of complaints about misdirection calls, Elections Canada did not contact Dimark Research, the company that made calls for the Conservative Party. Simon Rowland, a telephone systems expert, who once ran for the NDP and who assisted in the Elections Canada investigations in Guelph indicated that Elections Canada did not even consider some plausible methods by which fraud could have been implemented. The Regina Leader-Post reported that scripts published by Elections Canada in their report and used by the Conservative Party misled voters about changes in polling locations and sent voters up to 740 km away to vote, but were not investigated. Party lawyer Arthur Hamilton denied in writing that they were doing this and Elections Canada had previously warned the party not to communicate with voters about changes in polling locations and yet the report did not address this.

=== Responsibility ===
Prime Minister Stephen Harper and the Conservative Party of Canada denied any knowledge or involvement in the affair. Harper dismissed the allegations, calling them, "broad" and "sweeping". Then-NDP leader Nycole Turmel replied, "The Prime Minister must be tough on crime."

A Conservative Party staff member who worked for the Guelph riding campaign during the election and since then as an assistant for Conservative MP Eve Adams resigned soon after the scandal was reported, but later came forward stating that he was not involved.

The Conservatives blamed the calls upon multiple parties including the Liberal Party, Elections Canada, unnamed "third parties", an isolated incident, that they do not know who was responsible and that they did misdirect voters, but accidentally.

=== Other allegations of fraud ===
By early March, the scandal had spread to include more than just allegations of phone calls affecting the election outcome. On March 8, 2012, allegations were reported by the National Post that hundreds of unregistered voters who were not eligible to vote may have cast votes in the Toronto-area riding of Eglinton—Lawrence. At least 2,700 applications for late registration did not provide addresses or gave false or non-residential addresses.

In Etobicoke Centre, the Liberal candidate, Borys Wrzesnewskyj, alleged that 86 voters voted without valid ID and that a total of 181 people were improperly allowed to vote. The margin of victory in the riding was 26 votes for Conservative Ted Opitz. After being allowed to examine the election records, a court challenge was filed claiming 181 disputed votes. Two voters gave addresses outside of the riding, while 32 others were listed in another riding. Five voters were found to have voted twice, illegally. One polling division Deputy Returning Officer and Polling Clerk vouched for several voters, which they knew was illegal from their Elections Canada training. Wrzesnewskyj's case under Part 20 of the Canada Elections Act started in Ontario Superior Court in Toronto on April 23, 2012. On May 2, 2012 Elections Canada confirmed in court that 51 registration certificates from three polls were missing and cannot be confirmed as ever having been completed. Registration certificates are used to qualify a non-registered voter to vote. On May 18, 2012 Justice Thomas Lederer set aside 79 ballots, ruled that the election result was invalid due to irregularities and ordered a by-election. In response to the court ruling in early June the Conservative Party commenced robocalls into the riding telling voters that Wrzesnewskyj had plotted to "overthrow" the riding and telling voters that they have had their votes "taken away" by the court's decision. Opitz appealed the case to the Supreme Court of Canada, who on 25 October 2012 upheld Opitz's election in a split 4-3 decision, in which Chief Justice Beverley McLachlin sided with the minority.

In a further scandal, Elections Canada investigated the election finances of Associate Minister of National Defence Julian Fantino, after three former Conservative riding executives from Vaughan signed affidavits alleging impropriety in Fantino's 2010 and 2011 election campaigns. They alleged there was a second, secret, illegal bank account containing $300,000. Elections Canada requires that candidates have only one bank account during an election, to facilitate tracking of election related spending. Penalties include up to $1,000 fine and one year in jail, or $5,000 and five years in jail. An account statement showed by that the account held $357,939.86 on January 18, 2011. Elections Canada investigations are conducted in private until charges are laid, and accordingly a spokesperson would not confirm if this was under investigation.

John Fryer, an adjunct professor of the School of Public Administration at the University of Victoria, and a holder of the Order of Canada, claimed that he attended a Conservative campaign school where it was taught that misleading phone calls to suppress voting were acceptable. The course was organized by Fraser McDonald of the Manning Centre and Richard Ciano and Nick Kouvalis, founding members of Campaign Research, the Conservative Party's voter identification and market research company in the election. Fryer alleges that in January 2010 he attended a three-day seminar on robocalling techniques that included questions and answers directly discussing posing as a member of another party and regarding making rude calls at inconvenient times, as a strategy to get the supporter of another party to not go out and vote for their candidate. In a letter to The Globe and Mail, John Fryer said the voter suppression tactics described at this seminar were borrowed from those used by the Republican Party of the United States. In March 2012 Fryer issued a letter to Aaron Wudrick of Campaign Research stating "I am writing at your request to state that my comments which have been published recently were not intended to suggest that Mr Kouvalis, Mr Ciano or Campaign Research provided, discussed or made suggestions to participants regarding any illegal or unethical campaign or election tactics and apologize for any distress that this has been [sic] caused to your clients.".

On April 9, 2012 allegations were raised that two Front Porch Strategies American employees, company director PJ Wenzel and CEO Matthew Parker, had taken part in campaigning for Conservative candidates in contravention of the Canada Elections Act. The two had posted photos of themselves campaigning in Canada on Facebook.

=== Response ===
Elections Canada received 31,000 complaints during February 2012 and the first days of March 2012 alone. Most of the 31,000 contacts made to Elections Canada were the result of template letters and automated complaints from websites and various activist groups. Involvement of American activist groups such as Avaaz has worried many MPs, including NDP leader Nycole Turmel. The number of actual complaints was about 700. These 700 complaints, not the 31,000 complaints sent in protest, were the subject of investigation by Elections Canada. Complaints brought to Conservative MP Ryan Leef's Facebook page were repeatedly ignored and deleted.

Public support for Harper's government in polling was 31% and 37% as of early March 2012. The president of polling organization Ipsos-Reid, which conducted the poll, believed that the Conservatives had not suffered any real political damage over the controversy at that time. Later polls showed a tremendous drop in support for the Conservatives, partly linked to fallout from the robocall scandal. A poll done on March 22 - April 2, by the Canadian Press Harris-Decima showed the Conservatives at 34% and the NDP at 32%. An Ipsos-Reid poll done April 3–5 showed the Conservatives tied with the NDP, at 34% and 33%. Ipsos-Reid attributed this to weeks of enduring controversy, including the robocall scandal, an uninspiring budget and the auditor general's report on the troubled F-35 stealth-fighter program. A Leger Marketing April 2012 poll put the NDP ahead of the Conservatives at 34% vs 32%.

Preston Manning, who was a key player in the formation of the current conservative movement in Canada, indicated that he found the robocall and voter suppression tactics "deplorable". In Ottawa for a gathering of other conservatives, Manning reiterated to reporters that the use of voter suppression tactics is a concern for all political parties. A second concern voiced by Manning is that the revelation of such voter suppression and the use of unethical robocalls means that the Conservatives "have to worry and all the politicians have to worry about this declining respect – it's bordering on contempt for political people". Manning added that "If people don't respect and don't like politicians, they're going to rate that government, no matter what it does, low". A former Chief Electoral Officer, Jean Pierre Kingsley, called for a full disclosure of what happened and who did what.

According to an early March online survey, half of Canadians thought that by-elections should be held as soon as possible in those ridings in which the misleading calls took place. The same survey also stated that 63% of Canadians believe the Conservatives are "likely to provide false and misleading information to voters through telephone calls with pre-recorded messages during a political campaign", while the numbers for the Liberal, NDP, and Green Parties are lower at 55%, 33%, and 32%, respectively.

In a poll conducted by Ipsos-Reid, 75% of respondents agreed that "a special, independent commission of inquiry with judicial powers should be established to find out what happened in the past election and make recommendations on our future election rules and structure". 68% of poll respondents want by-elections to be held in affected ridings.

=== Protests ===
Protests began on March 3, 2012, with approximately 250 people rallying in Vancouver, British Columbia. Protests spread across Canada, with a protest held in Ottawa on March 5, 2012 and with protests taking place across 27 Canadian cities on March 11, promoted by groups including the Council of Canadians. The protest at Parliament Hill in Ottawa attracted between 40 and 100 people. A petition calling for an inquiry into the robocall scandal had accumulated 37,000 signatures by March 3, 2012.

In Toronto a protest march, starting at Dundas Square, was held March 11 to demand by-elections and a public inquiry, attracted a crowd of 1,500 demonstrators. A Calgary protest attracted 100 protesters including the Raging Grannies, while 60 protestors in Edmonton shouted slogans and sang O Canada. In northern Canada, a handful protested in the territorial capitals of Iqaluit and Yellowknife. The provincial capital of Prince Edward Island, Charlottetown, drew a protest of 60 at Province House. Windsor's protest drew a couple of dozen people. Downtown Nanaimo had a small and passionate crowd demanding a public inquiry. In Halifax, 80 people protested and were joined by an NDP MP, and in Victoria hundreds demanded accountability. Peterborough, the riding of Dean Del Mastro, the Conservative MP responsible for responding to the robocall scandal also had around 100 protesters. In Regina's Victoria Park, protestors blindfolded a statue of Sir John A. Macdonald. North Bay residents held a protest at their MP's office, while twenty people in Kelowna held a two-hour protest and asked drivers to honk their horns. Kamloops had ten residents protest. In Montreal, protesters, some of whom held up placards, held a demonstration and demanded a full public inquiry. Protests also took place in Winnipeg with more than 300 people in attendance including current and former NDP and Liberal MPs. In the riding where much of the robocall scandal began, Guelph, a small rally was held, as a few dozen protested in Kitchener. Simultaneously, protests were held in St. John's, and planned for Brampton, Brantford, Hamilton, Kingston, London, Nelson, Oshawa, Saskatoon, Hope, and Fort St. John. The second round of protests occurred March 31, 2012, in a number of Canadian cities including Toronto, St. John's, Brantford, Kitchener-Waterloo, Regina, Winnipeg, Victoria, Vancouver, Kelowna, Fraser Valley, Saint John, Montreal, Hamilton, Halifax, Calgary, Lethbridge, Edmonton, Canmore, Nelson, Ottawa (April 1), and Windsor. This day was termed the National Day against Election Fraud by organizers.

In between the first two cross-Canada protests, Belleville held an electoral fraud rally in solidarity with other ridings who have suffered electoral fraud. It was held at Market Square drawing 100 protestors, as well as Liberal, NDP and Green Party candidates, but not the Conservative MP.

=== Legal challenges ===
One contested riding, Nipissing—Timiskaming, was won by only 18 votes for the Conservative Party candidate. On March 7, Liberals indicated they were intending to launch a court challenge and were seeking evidence.

On March 27, 2012, the Council of Canadians announced that they had launched a lawsuit in the Federal Court of Canada to ask for by-elections to be ordered in seven ridings where complaints were received and where Conservatives had won by slim margins. The ridings named are Don Valley East, Winnipeg South Centre, Saskatoon—Rosetown—Biggar, Vancouver Island North, Yukon, Nipissing—Timiskaming and Elmwood—Transcona. In these seven ridings, none of the winning candidates filed statements in their defence.

On May 22, 2012, Conservatives who had claimed the seven seats called on the courts to dismiss all claims that could cause a byelection, relying on the tight deadlines for such a filing (30 days) rather than on the substance of the allegations. The Council of Canadians, which had organized the plaintiffs, indicated it would continue to press all seven cases, was abandoning none of them, and would oppose the Conservatives' motions, referring to them as "nothing more than an effort to dismiss the democratic rights of individual Canadians ... If the Conservatives really want to get to the bottom of the robocalls scandal, they would be keen to have these cases heard and decided. Instead, they are bringing entirely meritless motions to prevent that from happening." The move to dismiss was not allowed, Federal Court Prothonotary Martha Milczynski ruled on July 19, 2012 that the case should proceed, indicating that Council of Canadians' application raised serious doubts about the integrity of the democratic process.

On June 26, 2012, Brother Kornelis Klevering who was the Marijuana Party of Canada candidate for the riding of Guelph, launched his own legal challenge on the grounds that the robo fraud had completely poisoned the integrity of the electoral process, contrary to section 3 of the Canadian Constitution.

In August 2012 it was announced that the Council of Canadians case would be heard December 10–14, 2012, by the Federal Court. Also in August 2012 Elections Canada refused to hand over investigation records to the Federal Court cited jeopardizing ongoing investigations. Commissioner of Canada Elections Yves Côté stated in a written a Canada Evidence Act certificate, requesting an exemption from the court order, "public disclosure information from a partially completed investigation carries the serious risk of compromising the investigation by, among other things. influencing the testimony of witnesses, impairing the ability to verify information already obtained and affecting the willingness of witnesses to speak." Maude Barlow of the Council of Canadians responded, "Elections Canada won't tell us the basic facts of the case: when the complaints were received, which ridings are involved or what they are doing about it other than chasing Mr. Poutine. Canadians have the right to know whether the elections in their ridings might have been hijacked and what Elections Canada is doing about it. That is all we are asking." Among the evidence is the affidavit from the Responsive Marketing Group call centre worker who says she and her co-workers were given scripts to mislead voters on election into going to the wrong location to vote. The Conservative legal team called her testimony false.

In October 2012, the riding of Don Valley East was dropped from the legal case after it was found that Leeanne Bielli, the voter who initially brought the challenge forward, did not live in the riding and therefore was ineligible to challenge the result.

As part of the Council of Canadians case, court documents filed on November 5, 2012, showed that the Responsive Marketing Group, using scripts provided by the Conservative Party, had called voters at the end of the election campaign telling them that their polling stations had been moved when they had not been moved. The factum was filed by Steven Shrybman for the plaintiffs.

Many ridings in the election were won by a margin of fewer than 1,000 votes. If any riding has had electoral fraud that affected a number of voters that could have changed the outcome of the election, a judge can overturn the results. If the election results are thrown out in those ridings where election fraud is found to have altered the final results of the vote by-elections could be called potentially altering the makeup of the House of Commons.

On March 12, 2012, the House of Commons passed a unanimous non-binding motion in favour of granting greater investigative powers to Elections Canada and requiring telecommunication companies that contact voters during elections to register with Elections Canada. The government was given six months to bring forward legislation containing these reforms.

Justice Richard G. Mosley stated the official findings of the inquiry concluded that the epicenter of the voting fraud focused on Guelph. Although voting irregularities and misconduct occurred in the six contested ridings, it was not significant enough to warrant overturn the Conservative MP's mandated terms.

Judge Mosley wrote in his May 2013 decision: "I am satisfied that [it] has been established that misleading calls about the locations of polling stations were made to electors in ridings across the country, including the subject ridings, and that the purpose of those calls was to suppress the votes of electors who had indicated their voting preference in response to earlier voter identification calls ... I am satisfied, however, that the most likely source of the information used to make the misleading calls was the CIMS database maintained and controlled by the [Conservative Party of Canada], accessed for that purpose by a person or persons currently unknown to this court. There is no evidence to indicate that the use of the CIMS database in this manner was approved or condoned by the CPC."

Conservative MPs sought $355,907 in legal fees from the voters who challenged them in the failed bid by the Council of Canadians' attempt to overturn the election results. Although the court determined that there was widespread tampering of votes, it was not widespread enough to warrant overturning the seats.

In February 2015 enquiries by The Ottawa Citizen showed that Conservative MPs who were called to testify in the Council of Canadians' case about their party's involvement had at least a portion of their legal bills paid for by the taxpayers and not the party. The payments were approved by the Conservative-controlled House of Commons Board of Internal Economy.

== Other controversial robocalls from the 2011 federal election ==
In Peterborough, Ontario, Conservative Dean Del Mastro's campaign used robocalls. The calls did not identify the Tory campaign, but only used the name "Jeff", the name of Del Mastro's campaign manager, Jeff Westlake, and included a callback number. Telemarketing rules require a name or legal entity to be named in each call. The calls were made using Campaign Research, a firm used by 39 Conservative ridings during the 2011 election. Voters reported confusion following the endorsement message, as the Liberal Member of Provincial Parliament for Peterborough is also named Jeff, who subsequently issued a public statement to explain that he was not, in fact, endorsing Dean Del Mastro. Del Mastro became the MP in charge of responding to the robo-call scandal. In June 2012 Del Mastro himself became the subject of an Elections Canada investigation for alleged election over-spending irregularities in the 2008 general election campaign.

The Liberal campaign in Guelph sent a controversial automated phone call, which did not identify the origin of the calls as the Liberal Party and attacked the Conservative candidate over his position on abortion. The calls did not misdirect voters regarding polling stations, or fraudulently represent themselves as another party or from Elections Canada, but gave a pseudonym. They said that the Conservative candidate Marty Burke did not support a woman's right to choose. The Liberals said they fully disclosed their spending related to the robo-calls to Elections Canada. They released all their information about the calls, including a pair of transcripts and voice recordings. As a result Elections Canada did not find anything requiring investigation. On August 23, 2012, the Guelph Liberal riding association was fined $4,900 by the Canadian Radio-television and Telecommunications Commission for not identifying the source of robocalls they had made. According to the CRTC, it "reached a compliance agreement with Valeriote's riding association that included an admission of wrongdoing".

In response to the investigation the Liberals opened their books and challenged the Conservative Party to do the same. The Conservative Party has called for opposition parties to open their books, but has refused to do the same and release their own records.

== Electoral law in Canada ==
=== Criminal consequences ===
It is illegal under the Canada Elections Act to impersonate Elections Canada or to interfere with somebody's right to vote. Under Section 403 of the Criminal Code finds individuals who fraudulently impersonate others "(a) with intent to gain advantage for themselves or another person" or "(c) with intent to cause disadvantage to the person being personated or another person" guilty of identity fraud. On an indictment, the convicted faces up to 10 years in prison.

Furthermore, the Canada Elections Act specifies a variety of penalties for violating electoral law, including fines, jail time, and deregistration of a party. The Act lists a number of offenses that can result in the deregistration and liquidation of a party's assets, including providing false or misleading information.

The Elections Canada Act describes elections fraud as:

- Section 43(a) and 43(b): the wilful obstruction and impersonation of the duties of an election officer;
- S.56(e): the misuse of information obtained from the Register of Elections;
- S.281(g): the wilful endeavour to prevent and elector from voting;
- S.480(1): the intent of delaying or obstructing the electoral process; and
- S.482(b): anyone who "induces a person to vote or refrain from voting or to vote or refrain from voting for a particular candidate at an election" guilty of intimidation of the electoral process. Anyone convicted under s. 482(b) faces, on a summary conviction, a maximum $2,000 fine, or a maximum of one year in prison, or both. On an indictment, individuals found guilty face a maximum of five years in prison, a maximum $5,000 fine, or both.

The current Commissioner is William Corbett. The Commissioner (not the Chief Electoral Officer) is responsible for enforcing the Canada Elections Act and investigating complaints made. He can dismiss complaints if they are outside his jurisdiction, if sufficient remedy has been enacted or if there is no public interest to continue. The office of the Commissioner has investigators available but are able to draw on the RCMP for their investigative capacities for their expertise if he believes there has been an infraction of the Criminal Code. His office has the statutory authority to spend the money necessary to enforce the Canada Elections Act. He then will forward it to the Director of Public Prosecutions to decide whether charges will be laid.

=== Civil ===
Bill C-2 "Clause 524" allows "an elector or candidate to make an application to a court contesting an election on the grounds that the elected candidate was not eligible or that irregularities, fraud, or corrupt or illegal practices had affected the result of the election". However, the deadline requirements are relatively tight (eight to fifteen days).

== Legal proceedings and criminal charges ==
Former junior Conservative staff Michael Sona was "charged with having wilfully prevented or endeavoured to prevent an elector from voting at an election". Sona is the only Conservative to be charged with any crime related to any robocalls, and in August 2014, he was found guilty of one violation of the Elections Act. The trial judge concluded that it was unlikely that Sona acted alone in the commission of the offence. Justice Gary Hearn sentenced Sona to 9 months of imprisonment and 1 year of probation. He described Sona's actions as "an affront to the electoral process". Sona appealed, and his sentence was upheld in 2016.

=== Conclusion of investigation ===
On April 24, 2014, Commissioner of Canada Elections Yves Cote announced that his investigation had determined that there was insufficient evidence to believe that an offence was committed and that full investigation would not be possible as the commissioner had no power to compel documents or testimony. The Elections Canada investigation has been criticized by lawyer Steven Shrybman as "fatally flawed". Similar criticisms have been made by others as well.

== See also ==
- In and Out scandal
- Electoral fraud
- List of Canadian political scandals
- List of scandals with "-gate" suffix
