= In and Out scandal =

Political scandal in Canada

The "In and Out" scandal was a Canadian political scandal involving improper election spending on the part of the Conservative Party of Canada during the closely contested 2006 federal election. Parliamentary hearings into the issue led to a deadlocking of various committees, and then to the snap election in 2008. On 6 March 2012, charges were dropped as part of a plea deal in which the Conservative Party of Canada and its fundraising arm pleaded guilty to exceeding election spending limits and submitting fraudulent election records, and agreed to repay $230,198.00 for its role in violating Canadian election spending laws.

== Background ==
The basic "in and out" scheme involves transfers of money between different levels or organizations within a political party. Elections Canada places strict limits on campaign budgets in order to provide an even playing field between the parties. They also at the time directly funded political activity through per-vote financing, as well as reimbursing a major amount of campaign expenses for any riding where the candidate wins over a certain percentage of the votes. In recent elections, the per-vote payout has been around $2, while between 50 and 60% of campaign expenses are re-paid if the candidate wins over 10 to 15% of the riding.

It is the second of these two funding sources that is used in the in-and-out scheme. In the 2000 federal elections, the Bloc Québécois organized a system to inflate apparent campaign spending at the riding level, and thereby receive much higher refunds from Elections Canada. The Bloc organized "La Méthode In & Out" prior to the elections, having each candidate agree to certain spending numbers in order to inflate the overall cash flows. In exchange, Bloc leader Gilles Duceppe would sign their nomination papers, a requirement for running as a party candidate in the election.

Large amounts of cash were transferred from the party organization to the individual riding associations that are in charge of running one candidate's election campaign. The money was then distributed to the volunteers as payments for various expenses. The volunteers then donated that money back to the party. On the surface it appeared that the ridings were spending much larger amounts of money than normal, enough to drain the party war chest. In fact, a considerable portion of the money was being returned directly to the party's coffers.

Under normal circumstances the money received by the volunteers would be subject to income tax and therefore the scheme would be unattractive to them. But because the money was then spent on political donations, it could be written off. The only cost to the volunteer was time in filling out their tax forms - something they were giving up anyway as a volunteer for the party.

The scheme may have remained unknown if not for a court case against former Bloc MP, Jean-Paul Marchand. Marchand agreed to spend $66,000 as part of the in and out scheme, but spent only $22,276. The Bloc sued Marchand, saying he had broken his contract and owed them $36,362. A Quebec judge agreed with the Bloc, but lowered the amount to $16,362. When the story broke in 2003 as a result of the court case, the ruling Liberal Party immediately started to implement changes to the election law to stop this process. However, these changes were not implemented before the party lost power in 2006.

== In and Out ==
The current scandal, to which the term "in and out" now largely applies, refers to a scheme implemented by the Conservative Party in the 2006 election, the election that prevented passage of the bill outlawing the practice.

In this case of "in and out", it is held that the scheme was not only intended as a method of gaining additional income, but also as a way to avoid limitations on campaign spending at the national level. Having reached their $18.3 million campaign spending limit, the party transferred $1.3 million to 67 riding offices that had not yet reached their own local campaign limits, which varied but were around $80,000. The ridings then returned the money to the party, stating that it was being used to purchase advertising. The ads in question were identical to the party's national ads with the exception of a "paid for by..." message in small print that was added to the end of the ad in post-production.

The scheme was once again noticed only in a roundabout fashion, when some of the riding finance officers asked for the 60% reimbursement from Elections Canada. The first was an invoice submitted by Vancouver East candidate Elizabeth Pagtakhan; asked to explain a $29,999.70 election expense, Pagtakhan's official agent, Denny Pagtakhan, told an auditor "I think we contributed to TV national advertising. There was no way we can spend our limit so we were asked by the Party if we can help contribute."

Noticing that the invoices were all from a single company in Toronto, Retail Media, they became suspicious and Commissioner William Corbett started an investigation. Investigator Ronald Lamothe questioned Retail Media about the invoices, notably one for $39,999.91 sent by Steve Halicki's campaign for the riding of York South-Weston. The invoice was on Retail Media letterhead, yet Retail Media stated that they dealt only with the party and "did not generate invoices to candidates or electoral districts." The CEO even went so far to claim that "the invoice must have been altered or created by someone, because it did not conform to the appearance of invoices sent by Retail Media to the Conservative Party of Canada with respect to the media buy."

Returning to Steve Halicki's riding, Barbro Soderberg, Halicki's official agent, told investigators she was approached by Conservative Party campaign manager Romolo Cimaroli, who proposed a deposit of about $40,000 into Halicki's campaign account. The funds would be immediately transferred back to the party and recorded as an advertising expense. Despite misgivings, she was reassured by party officials that the transaction was legal.

The Conservative Party denied any documents were doctored or falsified, and claimed that the payments were above board. They stated that regional groups of riding organizations had met to plan out bulk purchases of airtime to be billed to the national party. The "alterations" were simply the editing of the bills at the party headquarters to divide up the amounts that should be billed to each riding.

== Fallout ==
Elections Canada did not accept the explanation, noting that the money was only sent out to candidates who had not spent close to their $80,000 limit, something the party could not have known before the election started. They also noted that airtime blocks were booked weeks before the ads ran, or the money had been paid to the ridings. In April 2007 the Chief Electoral Officer, Marc Mayrand, refused to pay the refunds, totaling about $780,000, stating that the party had paid for the ads. In an obvious parallel with the Bloc events of a decade earlier, the Conservative Party decided to sue Elections Canada to get the money back.

On 15 April 2008, Elections Canada and Royal Canadian Mounted Police (RCMP) officers raided the Conservative party headquarters in Ottawa. Tipped off, major news organizations and cameramen from the other political parties were already on hand when the RCMP officers arrived. Lamothe's affidavit noted:

"a deliberate 'in-and-out' scheme conceived to move money from national coffers into and out of the accounts of local campaigns, which have their own spending limits, in order to skirt the national spending limit... Funds were transferred into and out of each of the bank accounts of the 67 campaigns ... entirely under the control of and at the direction of officials of the Conservative Fund of Canada and/or the Conservative Party of Canada... The purpose of the in and out transfers was to provide participating candidates with documentation to support their reimbursement claims for these election expenses."

Garth Turner, who was elected in 2006 running for the Conservatives but later moved to the Liberals, went on record stating he was personally aware of one such transaction. He said:

"I was asked to be the guest speaker ... but before I gave my speech the treasurer gave their report for the annual meeting and they had more than $40,000, which was transferred into their bank account and then the same day they wrote a cheque back to the central party. And by transferring $40,000 into their bank account during the campaign they got a 60 per cent rebate.

Sam Goldstein, who ran what The Ottawa Citizen described as a Conservative "token campaign" against Olivia Chow in Trinity—Spadina, later went on record stating that he agrees that the transfers were to pay for national ads. He told Citizen that "Its national advertising is what it is."

A brief political firestorm erupted over the issue, which was quieted by the 2008 election that started soon after. The opposition parties repeatedly attacked the Prime Minister during Question Period. The Prime Minister only responded directly to the questions on one occasion, challenging the Liberals to make their accusations outside the chamber where they were not protected from parliamentary privilege.

Conservative party executives and press contacts stated that there is nothing illegal about transferring money to ridings for advertising, and that all the parties did it. Heather MacIvor at the University of Windsor noted that the Conservatives were being disingenuous, and that it was the intent to receive the Elections Canada funds that constituted the "in and out".

== House investigation and snap election ==
The issue fell under the purview of the House Standing Committee on Procedure and House Affairs, an inter-party group that includes all four party whips.

At the time, the committee was chaired by Conservative Gary Goodyear, who the opposition parties claim used his position to delay any debate on the issue, including hours of filibuster. This led to his removal from the position in a vote of non-confidence. He was replaced by Joe Preston who did not want the position, called no meetings, and then resigned almost immediately. The Conservative party whip, Jay Hill, stated that no new chair would be named unless the opposition parties agree to drop any debate of the in and out scheme.

The remaining members of Committee, nevertheless, continued to investigate, calling a number of witnesses to testify about the affair. Most of them refused to appear, which led to the issuing of 31 summonses, unparalleled in House history.

The deadlocking of the Procedure and House Affairs committee was one of a number of such actions that had led to a breakdown of the House process. On 14 May, the Speaker of the House of Commons of Canada, Peter Milliken, said rulings by committee chairs are being routinely overturned by majority votes, even when the rulings are procedurally sound. Such a state of affairs has led to "general lawlessness" at committees. Partisan fighting, the cause of the problem, was renewed as the parties blamed each other for the problems.

It was this breakdown of procedure that led to the calls for a snap election. Stephen Harper blamed Stéphane Dion for the problems when he first hinted on 14 August that an election might be called. Referring to the in and out hearings as a kangaroo court, he stated that the committees were being ruled by a "tyranny of the majority". No breakthrough was forthcoming, and the election call was made on 27 August.

== Litigation ==
The Conservatives claimed to have won a victory when their case against Elections Canada returned a decision suggesting that the body had overstepped its mandate. However, this ruling was then overturned on appeal. The Conservatives sought leave to appeal that court ruling to the Supreme Court of Canada, which was rejected on May 4, 2011. No explanation was given, as is usual in such instances. The decision means that the Conservatives may not use local expenses as a means of reducing their 2006 election expenses.

In 2010 and 2011, several former Conservatives came forward, saying they were punished for refusing to take part in the scheme. Inky Mark of Manitoba and Helena Guergis of Ontario both state they were approached in 2006 to take funds from the federal party and then return them. Both refused. They join similar claims made earlier by David Marler of Quebec, and Dave Mackenzie of Ontario, who was noted as also refusing the funds although he has not spoken publicly on the issue.

On February 24, 2011, four senior Conservative Party members were charged in the In and Out Scandal under the Canada Elections Act with overspending over $1 million in the 2006 election including allegations that Conservative election expense documents submitted to Elections Canada were "false or misleading" and attempted to fraudulently gain almost $1 million in refunds from taxpayers. Senator Doug Finley, (the party's campaign director in 2006 and 2008, and the husband of Human Resources Development Minister Diane Finley), Senator Irving Gerstein, Michael Donison (former national party director) and Susan Kehoe (who has served as an interim party executive director) all faced three months in jail, $1000 in fines, or both.

On March 6, 2012, charges were dropped as part of a plea deal which saw the Conservative Party plead guilty over the "In and Out" scandal, agreeing to repay $230,198 for its role in the scheme.

== See also ==
- ETS Scandal
- List of Canadian political scandals
- 2011 Canadian federal election voter suppression scandal
