= Karl Toft =

Canadian convicted sex predator

- Born: Karl Richard Toft; June 30, 1936; Fredericton, New Brunswick, Canada
- Died: April 28, 2018 (aged 81); Edmonton, Alberta, Canada
- Criminal status: Deceased
- Criminal penalty: 13 years (convicted in December 1992)

Details
- Victims: 34 - 200+
- Date: 1955–1990
- Target: Minors
- Date apprehended: 1990

Karl Richard Toft (June 30, 1936 – April 28, 2018) was a Canadian convicted sex predator and pederast who committed an estimated 200 sexual assaults while working as a guard at the New Brunswick Training School in Kingsclear, New Brunswick. He was regarded as one of Canada's worst sex offenders. Toft was convicted of 34 sex-related charges and sentenced in December 1992 to 13 years in prison. In 1994, Toft appealed the sentence but lost. He served 11 years of his sentence and was freed. He was represented by Daniel Watters, who maintained that two-thirds of the allegations were untrue.

== History of sexual assaults ==
Toft was fired in 1968 after a picture surfaced of a nude scout member taken in Toft's camper. Information also surfaced that Toft and Scout Master George Mountain played a game of "strip tag" in which participants would lose articles of clothing if they were caught.

Toft was the caregiver of a foster child from 1981 to 1984, after which time Toft asked to have the child removed. Toft was convicted in 1991, along with 33 other counts, of the ongoing sexual and, later, physical abuse that occurred during that period.

At the New Brunswick Training School, Toft is reported to have forced inmates to give him oral sex, performed oral sex on inmates, fondled and anally penetrated inmates, drugged inmates in order to have sex with them, violently attacked inmates causing injuries to genitals, and stood by as inmates were sexually assaulted by other inmates. Many of the assaults apparently occurred while inmates were signed out on day passes for field trips initiated or supervised by Toft.

== Allegations of sexual misconduct ==
As far back as 1971, Toft was the subject of troubling reports from staff at the New Brunswick Training School.

In 1975, then-superintendent William Keys informed John B. M. Baxter, a cabinet minister, and Robert King, a correctional services official, that he suspected sexual abuse involving Toft. He testified that he was told he needed proof. He again complained in 1985 when Toft's dismissal from the Scouts for sexual abuse was discovered. He was told by his superior, William Connor, that more proof was needed.

In 1985, Toft was moved from the Kingsclear Facility's training school to the Central Reformatory after Fredericton City Police approached the superintendent about reports of sexual abuse. No internal investigation was conducted, but the move was in response to another guard, David Forbes, having witnessed Toft inappropriately touching an inmate. Forbes reported that he took the matter to Cpl. Lillian Ulsh (now Insp. Lillian Ripley) at the Child Protection Branch of the Fredericton Police Department. Although Ulsh recognized that the RCMP had jurisdiction over the matter, she failed to notify the RCMP. Forbes was transferred out of the province but continued to seek an investigation. In January 1991, Toft was again transferred, this time to the Commercial Vehicle Enforcement Branch, possibly in response to more inquiries about allegations of sexual abuse. However, the transfer letter to Toft includes the statement "your acceptance of this re-assignment is by mutual agreement and is not considered disciplinary in nature."

According to a witness at the Miller Inquiry on sexual abuse at Kingsclear, as many as 16 inmates may have had a meeting with someone from the Ombudsman's Office when he was said to have visited the Training School. The witness said that the inmates demanded to know why Toft was still allowed to work at the institution. They claimed that Toft's behaviour was well known. Charles Ferris, the Ombudsman in 1994, claimed that any such complaint would have been investigated but that there were no records of the visit.

In 1990, Forbes was interviewed by Richard Robinson of the CBC, which prompted an investigation by the RCMP.

Toft was arrested in mid-1991 and charged with 35 counts of sexual misconduct. One charge was later dropped. An additional 15 charges were laid against Toft after his conviction, but were stayed by the Attorney-General. In 2002, John Fearon, one of Toft's alleged victims, began a hunger strike at Fredericton to protest against the lack of development in the case.

== Miller Inquiry ==
The Miller Inquiry, conducted by Justice Richard Miller, began in 1992 to investigate "the recognized or perceived institutional misconduct of which children and youth were victims". Lasting nearly two years, the Inquiry heard from Kingsclear staff, RCMP, victims, and Toft himself. A report was released in February 1995 that detailed the sequence of events leading to Toft's arrest. The report concluded that a deliberate cover-up probably did not occur, but that the author was given "considerable concern" by "an attitude of indifference which seemed to permeate so many − too many, within the Department of Corrections". While rejecting the allegations of a cover-up, Miller nevertheless noted that the institution's solution had been

to transfer the employee and hope that the whole affair would be buried and forgotten. And to protect themselves from a suggestion of negligence, a false request for voluntary transfer was produced as the only documentary evidence to record the whole event.

Miller also condemned the reaction to a 1991 report to the Premier's office that detailed available evidence, including Forbes' written statements, writing, "Then followed what I consider a very carefully orchestrated handling, or mis-handling, of the report." Although Toft was investigated and arrested, the Garneau report, and other relevant documents, were not made available to the RCMP or to Fredericton City Police.

Miller made 20 recommendations, mainly concerning better administrative policy to ensure the protection of wards of Child Services, fail-safes for catching abuse, and better training and placement for staff working directly with youth and in sensitive situations. He also recommended that a program of compensation be established for the victims of sexual abuse at Kingsclear (see below).

== Richard Hatfield ==
Allegations were made, though never proven in court, that Toft brought inmates from the Kingsclear Correctional Facility to the home of then-Premier Richard Hatfield, where they were allegedly propositioned as well as made to do menial labour such as yardwork. One inmate, whose name was here withheld, testified that he was sexually abused by Toft and that Toft and Hatfield offered him a ride in a Bricklin car. The inmate alleged that Hatfield offered him money for sex while the two were alone and driving in the Bricklin.

== Systemic abuse at Kingsclear ==
The Miller Inquiry brought to light a culture of abuse and cover-ups that occurred at least from the 1980s to the mid-1990s. While the Inquiry was being held, another sexual assault was reported at the facility, prompting questions about how widespread the sexual abuse was. The inquiry also uncovered incidents of physical abuse but failed to assess the ubiquity of these incidents. The inquiry documented the decades-long chain of events that finally lead to Toft's conviction, showing that various reports to Fredericton City police, the RCMP, the Daily Gleaner, the CBC, the Attorney General, and Cabinet Ministers failed to lead to disciplinary action against Toft and other institution staff. An investigation of Forbes’ claims of sexual abuse led to a report by the Executive Director of Policing Services, Hugh Robichaud, condemning the actions of Forbes for not following proper channels. The Miller Inquiry was not specifically mandated to investigate systemic abuse, prompting some to remark that the victims have not yet received justice and closure.

== False accusation ==
One former resident at the New Brunswick Training School, Ronald Osborne, alleged that Toft had sexually assaulted him, but later retracted his accusation. Toft had already pleaded guilty to the charge along with the other 34 counts. Osborne claimed he had been bullied by two other former residents of the Training School into making the allegation as a means of getting back at guards.

== Victim compensation ==
One of the recommendations of the Miller Report was that victims receive compensation for the abuse they suffered while in the care of the provincial government. Compensation was issued to victims who claimed by 1996, but the claim period was later re-opened with a 1999 deadline to accommodate victims who had been unable to claim by the previous deadline. The government paid out $10,159,744.66 to 416 claimants.

== Death ==
Toft died on April 28, 2018, from lung cancer at the Edmonton General Continuing Care Centre, aged 81.

== See also ==
- List of youth detention incidents in Canada
