= ETS Scandal =

Canadian political scandal

The ETS Scandal is an ongoing Canadian political scandal involving alleged wrongdoing by Canadian government officials in the award of a $400-million information technology services contract and allegations of political interference in the ensuing cover-up.

== Background ==
In 2006, Public Works and Government Services Canada (PWGSC), the federal department in charge of contracting information technology (IT) services, issued a request for proposal for an Engineering and Technical Services (ETS) contract. The contract would involve the right to manage and maintain PWGSC's main computer systems and networks. From 1999 to 2006, the firm that had been providing those services was TPG Technology Consulting Ltd (TPG), an Ottawa-based IT professional services company.

After initially being ruled ineligible for bidding on the new ETS contract based on its size, TPG was finally ruled eligible after partnering with another organization. However, in the new request for proposals, the government officials overseeing the evaluation decided not to use certain standard government procurement practices, such as requiring a fairness monitor to review the evaluation process and providing a debrief once the contract was awarded.

On October 31, 2007, the $400 million contract was awarded to Montreal-based CGI. However, there were some inconsistencies in the scoring. Before the award of the contract, TPG raised concerns about the scoring of the technical evaluation in a press conference.

Believing the process had been conducted unfairly, TPG launched a lawsuit in March 2008, raising concerns about the procurement process as well as possible political intervention, particularly from PWGSC Minister, the Honourable Michael Fortier. In his previous role as Credit Suisse First Boston’s key Montreal executive in 2004, Fortier had helped to underwrite CGI's $858 million acquisition of AMS Inc. Based on this apparent conflict of interest, opposition parties and the media called for a public inquiry. These calls were denied by the Conservative government.

On June 10, 2008, Don Powell, President of TPG, testified at a Parliamentary Committee about the irregularities in the ETS procurement. In early 2009, TPG and 17 other defendants were charged with bid-rigging by a newly appointed Crown Prosecutor, who had run for the Progressive Conservatives in the 1997 election. This charge has been presented by the media as retribution by the government against TPG and Powell for alleging unfairness in the procurement process and a political cover-up.

Since 2009, the legal battle has continued, with more information coming out to indicate political intervention.

== Oddities ==
As a result of the many unusual circumstances surrounding the award of the ETS contract and its aftermath, many members of the media, politicians and judges (amongst others) have raised concerns in relation to this scandal. These include:

- No fairness monitor was appointed to oversee the ETS procurement process – it is highly unusual that the government should decide not to include one on a contract of that size.
- During the evaluation process, scores given by individual evaluators did not coincide with the scores obtained by the same evaluators in a consensus process.
- An outside consultant hired by PWGSC advised the evaluation team to destroy all records related to the evaluation.
- The government refused to debrief the companies that had lost the award.
- Even the Canadian International Trade Tribunal ruled against the government regarding some of the ways the proposals were evaluated.
- Government officials refused to provide information about the evaluation. This resulted in numerous Access to Information requests and Federal Court proceedings to obtain the requested documents.

== Government response ==
When asked in the House of Commons about any potential conflict of interest, the government's initial response was to deny any conflict of interest. However, many of the questions raised in the House Standing Committee on Government Operations and Estimates remain unanswered. Members of the opposition parties (New Democratic Party, Bloc Québécois and Liberal) continue to ask about the issue but get no response from the government.

In February 2009, following press conferences and an appearance by TPG's owner Don Powell to a parliamentary committee, a newly appointed federal Crown Prosecutor charged TPG, Powell and 17 other defendants with an as-yet-unproven allegation of bid-rigging.

In April 2015 the first jury trial ended with not guilty on all counts verdicts for Marina Durward, Sue Laycock, Phil McDonald, Don Powell, Tom Townsend, Ron Walker, Devon Group, Spearhead Management and TPG Technology, with David Watts being acquitted in February by directed verdict.

In May 2015 an official with the federal Public Prosecution Service of Canada confirmed that "There will be no appeal on any aspect of the trial. The case is complete".

Having chosen a trial in front of a judge instead of a jury, the remaining defendants, Barry Dowdall, David Gelineau, Perry Henningsen, Donna Cona Inc. and Brainhunter, still face trial on the same information and set of facts.

== Conservative Party connections ==
This scandal involves a number of present or former Conservative officials:

- The Honourable Michael Fortier, a former senator and PWGSC Minister when the contract was awarded. In his prior role as Credit Suisse First Boston's key Montreal executive in 2004, Fortier had helped to underwrite CGI's $858 million acquisition of AMS Inc. In 2003, Fortier was the co-chair of now-Prime Minister Stephen Harper’s leadership campaign, and in 2006 he was co-chair of the Conservative campaign.
- Denis Pilon, a Crown Prosecutor having joined the government in late 2008. He charged TPG and its owner with bid-rigging (under the Competition Act). Pilon had been a Progressive Conservative candidate in the 1997 federal election.
- Justice David Near, who issued a controversial ruling on the ETS case. Only 18 months prior to hearing an important motion on this case, he had been working in the office of the Conservative Minister of Justice. He was also chief of staff to a former Conservative Minister’s Office.

== Continuing controversy ==
The cases, particularly the lawsuit by TPG and the government’s bid-rigging charges against TPG, continue to be heard in Canadian courts.

TPG has also filed a lawsuit against the Government of Canada and three officials of the Competition Bureau for defamation and abuse of public office stemming from statements published by the government on the Competition Bureau website. The statements claim that there was evidence that TPG and other companies had a plan to defraud the government and to inflate prices.

Initially, in July 2011, Superior Court Justice Stanley Kershman dismissed the claim on the grounds that the allegedly defamatory words were not capable of bearing defamatory meaning.

However, upon TPG's appeal, the Court of Appeal for Ontario ruled in February 2012 that the dismissal of the defamation claim brought by TPG was in error, and TPG’s claim should be allowed to proceed to trial. The court ruled that Justice Kershman had erred, and it could not be determined, based solely on a Crown motion, whether or not statements made about TPG on the Government of Canada’s Competition Bureau website were defamatory. The ruling states, "The determination of that issue is better left to trial on a full factual record."

This trial is also ongoing.

== See also ==
- In and Out scandal
- List of Canadian political scandals
