= Sabine Anne Sparwasser =

German diplomat

Sabine Sparwasser
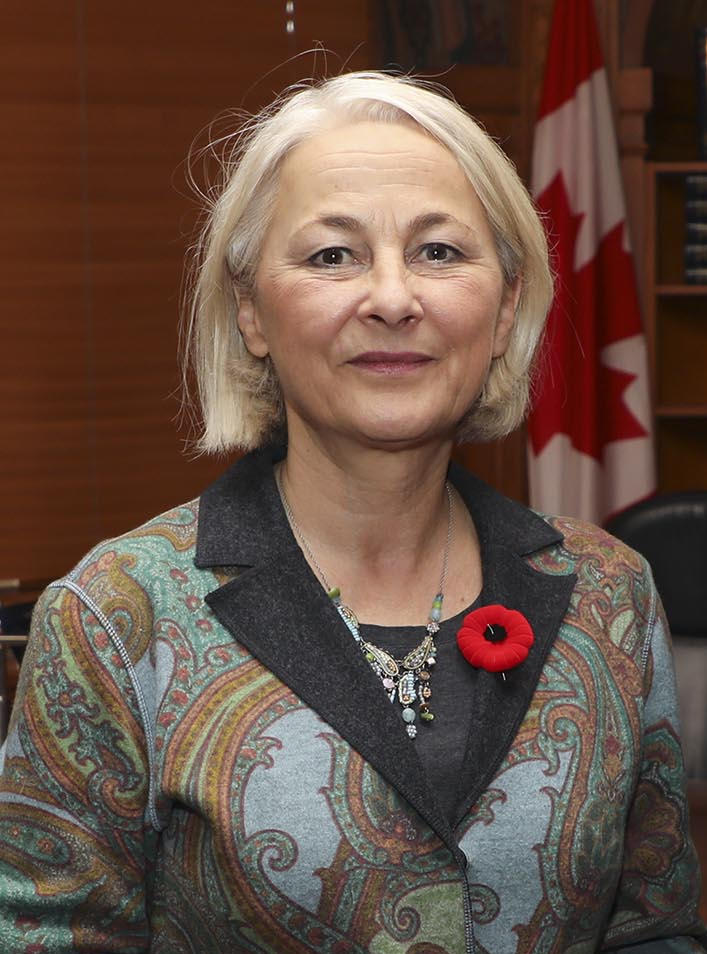
- Sparwasser in 2017

German ambassador to Canada
- In office 2017–2024
- Preceded by: Werner Wnendt
- Succeeded by: Tjorven Bellmann and Matthias Lüttenberg

Personal details
- Born: 1957 (age 68–69)
- Education: Sciences Po; University of Mainz

Sabine Sparwasser (born 1957) is a retired German diplomat. Senior offices held by her include Head of the Foreign Service Academy; Assistant Deputy Minister for Africa, Asia, Latin America, and the Near and Middle East; Special Representative of the Federal Government for Afghanistan and Pakistan; and lastly Ambassador to Canada.

== Biography ==
After completing her secondary education at the Görres-Gymasium in Koblenz, Germany, Sparwasser studied German literature, French literature, English literature, and linguistics at the Johannes Gutenberg-Universität Mainz from 1976 until 1981. She then undertook postgraduate studies in the field of political science, with a specialization in international relations, at the Institut d'études politiques de Paris (SciencesPo), completing her diplôme in 1983. Between 1981 and 1984 she also worked as a freelance journalist for German television. From 1984 to 1985 she held the position of research assistant on European integration to Joseph Rovan, Professor of German history and politics at the Université Paris-Vincennes.

In 1985 she entered the German foreign service and, after qualifying to hold diplomatic office, served from 1987 to 1989 as Third Secretary in the Public Relations Department of the Federal Foreign Office, and then from 1989 to 1991 as Second Secretary in the Political Section of the German representation to the European Community in Brussels. From 1991 to 1993 she was First Secretary in the Political Section of the German Embassy in London (United Kingdom). From 1993 until 1996 she held the position in the Federal Foreign Office in Bonn of Counsellor in the Press Department dealing with the United Nations, North and Latin America, the Near and Middle East, and Asia.

Sparwasser's next appointment was as Deputy Head of Mission at the German Embassy in San José, Costa Rica from 1996 to 1999. She then assumed the role of Deputy Spokesperson for the Federal Foreign Office in Berlin from 1999 to 2002, before accepting a position for one year as an exchange officer in the Canadian Department of Foreign Affairs and International Trade. She then remained in Canada, serving from 2003 to 2006 as Chargé d'Affaires/Deputy Head of Mission in the German Embassy in Ottawa. On her return to Germany she directed the Middle East and Maghreb Division of the Federal Foreign Office in Berlin from 2006 to 2009.

From 2009 until 2013 Sparwasser served as German Consul General in Toronto (Canada). Returning to the Federal Foreign Office in Berlin in 2013, she held the office of Director for Communication, Germany's Image Abroad and German as a Foreign Language, before being appointed Head of the German Foreign Service Academy the following year.

From July 2015 until September 2017 Sparwasser served as Assistant Deputy Minister for Africa, Asia, Latin America, the Near and Middle East in the Federal Foreign Office and as Special Representative of the Federal Government of Germany for Afghanistan and Pakistan. In the latter capacity she was responsible for coordinating Germany's diplomatic activities vis-à-vis this geographic region. In addition, she served as president of the International Contact Group of special representatives for Afghanistan.

Sparwasser was appointed as Ambassador of the Federal Republic of Germany to Canada in 2017. Upon her retirement in 2024 she was formally thanked in the Senate of Canada for her distinguished service to both Canada and Germany and for her "transformational" contribution to the relationship between the two countries.

Since leaving the diplomatic service, Sparwasser has assumed the position of Dean of the Mercator Fellowship on International Affairs.
