= Kingsclear, New Brunswick =

Unincorporated area in southwestern New Brunswick, Canada

Coordinates: 45°53′N 66°54′W

Kingsclear is an unincorporated rural area 20 km west of Fredericton, New Brunswick, Canada.

The area includes forests, Saint John River shoreline, agricultural land, small businesses, rural residences, and the Mactaquac Dam. Access is via the Trans-Canada Highway, and NB Routes 102, and 3.

Local governance was provided by the Kingsclear Local Service District (KLSD). The KSLD did not govern the Wolastoqey Indian Reserve Kingsclear 6, which forms an enclave.

About 2,800 people live within the area of the KLSD. Named areas include French Village, Island View, Longs Creek, Lower Kingsclear, Ludford Subdivision, Mazerolle Settlement, Newmarket, Oswald Gray Subdivision, Smithfield, and Upper Kingsclear.

== See also ==
- Kings Landing Historical Settlement: an outdoor museum with original buildings from the period of 1820-1920.
- New Brunswick Training School: a former youth detention centre in the area.
