= New Brunswick Training School =

Prison in New Brunswick, Canada from c. 1962 to 1988

- Interactive map of New Brunswick Training School
- Location: Kingsclear, New Brunswick, Canada; 45.9658°N 66.8045°W
- Opened: December 1962; 63 years ago

The New Brunswick Training School, also known as the Kingsclear Youth Training Centre, was a youth detention centre in Kingsclear, New Brunswick, Canada, about 10 km (6.2 mi) west of Fredericton.

It closed in 1998 following an inquiry into abuse there. It was set to close in late 1997, and was to be succeeded by a new facility in Miramichi.

It was a wing of the Kingsclear Reformatory, a minimum security facility located nearby, which closed in 2000.

== History ==
The New Brunswick Training School was opened in Kingsclear in 1962, following demand for a new facility for juvenile delinquents that would replace the aging Boys' Industrial Home in Saint John. Construction on the facility began in late 1961, contracted by Moncton-based Modern Construction Limited and budgeted at $554,500. On March 8, 1962, premier Louis Robichaud introduced the Training School Act to provide for the institution's construction as a replacement to the former Saint John facility. It was granted Royal Assent on March 29. The new facility was completed and opened in December 1962, and its first 50 boys were transferred from Saint John.

=== Child sexual abuse of inmates ===
Karl Toft was one of the guards at Kingsclear and was convicted of committing 34 sex crimes against inmates between the mid 1960s and the mid 1980s. He has admitted to raping over 200 boys in a 35-year period. Other guards have been alleged to have also raped boys at Kingsclear.

== See also ==
- List of youth detention incidents in Canada
- Brookside Youth Centre
- Project Turnaround
- Bluewater Youth Centre
- Nova Scotia Youth Centre
